= Donald Singer =

British pharmacologist (1954–2022)

- Born: 20 August 1954; Forres, Morayshire, Scotland
- Died: 11 June 2022 (aged 67)
- Medical career
- Field: Clinical pharmacology; Therapeutics
- Institutions: Fellowship of Postgraduate Medicine

Donald Robert James Singer (20 August 1954 – 11 June 2022) was a British clinical pharmacologist who was the president of the Fellowship of Postgraduate Medicine.

== Biography ==
He was born in Forres, Scotland and attended schools in Iraq, Bahrain, and Scotland. He died on 11 June 2022, at the age of 67.

== Medical career ==
Singer was awarded Bachelor of Medical Biology and Bachelor of Medicine and Surgery degrees from the University of Aberdeen in 1975 and 1978 respectively, followed by the MD degree in 1995. He served as senior lecturer/consultant and then reader at St George's Hospital Medical School from 1996 to 2003, having previously trained at the Aberdeen Teaching Hospitals, Hammersmith Hospital, the Royal Postgraduate Medical School, and the Charing Cross and Westminster Medical School. While at St George's, he held honorary research posts at the Harefield Heart Science Centre, a research facility of the National Heart and Lung Institute, a Division of the Faculty of Medicine of Imperial College. He was appointed professor of clinical pharmacology and therapeutics at the graduate medical school of the University of Warwick in 2003. In 2007, Singer was elected president of the Fellowship of Postgraduate Medicine. In 2014 he was on the Faculty of Yale University School of Medicine.

== Medical activities ==
His interests included new approaches to personalising medicine, chemical and genomic research for the discovery of medicines and their harmful effects, prevention and treatment of hypertension and other disorders of the heart and circulation, and public understanding of health. He is a co-author of the Pocket Prescriber, a paper and electronic guide on safe and effective use of medicines for health students and prescribers, in publication with 8 editions since 2004.

Singer was active on many medical and professional committees, including for the British Hypertension Society, the London Hypertension Society (president 1990–2002), the British Pharmacological Society, the West Midlands Physicians Association, the European Union of Medical Specialists, the European Association of Internal Medicine, and the European Federation of Internal Medicine. He was a co-founder and associate editor of the European Journal of Internal Medicine. He was a former advisory panel member for the National Health Service Health Technology Assessment Programme, for the Pharmaceuticals Panel, and for the Primary Care, Community and Preventive Interventions Panel, an executive committee member of the British Microcirculation Society, secretary of the European Association for Clinical Pharmacology and Therapeutics, and former member of council and co-chair (2011–2013) of the Committee of Heads of Pharmacology and Therapeutics of the British Pharmacological Society. He was a Fellow of the British Pharmacological Society and an honorary Fellow of the Finnish Society for Internal Medicine and the European Federation of Internal Medicine. He was chair of the advisory board of Health Policy and Technology and a consulting editor for Clinical Therapeutics He was a member of the Healthcare Professionals' Working Party of the European Medicines Agency. He has worked as a clinical pharmacologist on the Human Resources for Health Programme for Rwanda advising on systems for pharmacovigilance and organizing an International Symposium on Medicines and Patient Safety held in Kigali in November 2014 in partnership with Pharmacology for Africa and IUPHAR.

== Poetry and medicine ==
He was co-founder in 2009 with Michael Hulse of the Hippocrates Prize for Poetry and Medicine for UK NHS-related poets and the International Hippocrates Prize for Poetry and Medicine. Singer, Michael Hulse and Sorcha Gunne won the 2011 Times Higher Education Award for Excellence and Innovation in the Arts for the Hippocrates poetry and medicine initiative. This award aims to recognise the collaborative and interdisciplinary work within universities and their external partners to promote the arts. In 2012, he co-founded with Michael Hulse the international Hippocrates Prize for Young Poets for poetry on a medical theme. In 2013, he was co-founder with Michael Hulse of the international Hippocrates Society for Poetry and Medicine. Since 2017, Open, Health Professional and Young Poet categories are all international in the Hippocrates Prize for Poetry and Medicine. The 2017 Hippocrates Prize for Poetry and Medicine was held in partnership with the Arts and Humanities Initiative of Harvard Medical School.

== Other interests ==
He was formerly a trustee of the Richmond Orchestra (London) and Ealing Junior Music School (London). In 2010 he co-founded the "Healthy Heart Awards" for schools and colleges. The inaugural 2011 Healthy Heart Awards were organised by the Cardiovascular Research Trust and supported by "Heads, Teachers and Industry". Selected healthy heart poetry entered from 19 schools for the 2013 and the 2014 Healthy Heart Awards was published in the Love your Heart anthology.

== See also ==
- Postgraduate Medical Journal
- Health Policy and Technology
- Clinical Therapeutics
