= Nuala Helsby =

Professor of pathology in New Zealand

- Awards: Fellow of the British Pharmacological Society

Academic background
- Education: University of Liverpool
- Thesis: Inter-individual Variation in the Metabolism and Pharmacokinetics of the Antimalarial Biguanides

Nuala Ann Helsby FBPhS is a New Zealand academic, and is a full professor of molecular medicine and pathology at the University of Auckland, specialising in transport of anticancer pharmaceuticals and drug treatments for autoimmune conditions.

== Academic career ==
Helsby completed a PhD titled Inter-individual Variation in the Metabolism and Pharmacokinetics of the Antimalarial Biguanides at the University of Liverpool. Helsby carried out postdoctoral research at Liverpool and the University of Birmingham, before joining the faculty of the University of Auckland. She initially worked in the Auckland Cancer Society Research Centre, before taking up a position in the Department of Molecular Medicine and Pathology. She was appointed full professor in 2024.

Helsby was an executive editor of the British Journal of Clinical Pharmacology for seven years. Helsby is vice-chair of the Drug Metabolism and Transporter Section of the International Union of Basic and Clinical Pharmacology, and is the New Zealand representative on the board of the Australasian Society of Clinical and Experimental Pharmacologists and Toxicologists.

Helsby's research focuses on transport of anti-cancer drugs and treatments for autoimmune conditions, and genetic variations in drug metabolism. She is part of a team, led by Rhys Ponton, investigating the link between fast metabolism of codeine and propensity for addiction. She has also written about the importance of assessing drug metabolism individually rather than relying on ethnic background as a predictor.

== Selected works ==
- Stephen P H Alexander; Doriano Fabbro; Eamonn Kelly; et al. (2021). "THE CONCISE GUIDE TO PHARMACOLOGY 2021/22: Enzymes". British Journal of Pharmacology. 178 (S1). doi:10.1111/bph.15542. PMID 34529828. Wikidata Q119459640.
- Ward SA; Helsby, Nuala Ann; Skjelbo E; Brøsen K; Gram LF; Breckenridge AM (1991). "The activation of the biguanide antimalarial proguanil co-segregates with the mephenytoin oxidation polymorphism--a panel study". British Journal of Clinical Pharmacology. 31 (6): 689–692. doi:10.1111/j.1365-2125.1991.tb05594.x. PMC 1368581. PMID 1867963. Wikidata Q34358893.
- G Edwards; A Dingsdale; Helsby, Nuala Ann; M L Orme; A M Breckenridge (1988). "The relative systemic availability of ivermectin after administration as capsule, tablet, and oral solution". European Journal of Clinical Pharmacology. 35 (6): 681–684. doi:10.1007/bf00637608. PMID 3234475. Wikidata Q52460898.
- Helsby, Nuala Ann; Ferry DM; Patterson, Adam V.; Pullen SM; Wilson WR (2004). "2-Amino metabolites are key mediators of CB 1954 and SN 23862 bystander effects in nitroreductase GDEPT". British Journal of Cancer. 90 (5): 1084–1092. doi:10.1038/sj.bjc.6601612. PMC 2409616. PMID 14997211. Wikidata Q38797133.
- William R Wilson; Susan M Pullen; Alison Hogg; Helsby, Nuala Ann; Kevin O Hicks; Denny, William Alexander (2002). "Quantitation of bystander effects in nitroreductase suicide gene therapy using three-dimensional cell cultures". Cancer Research. 62 (5): 1425–1432. PMID 11888915. Wikidata Q43913566.
- Helsby, Nuala Ann; Ward SA; Edwards G; Howells RE; Breckenridge AM (1990). "The pharmacokinetics and activation of proguanil in man: consequences of variability in drug metabolism". British Journal of Clinical Pharmacology. 30 (4): 593–598. doi:10.1111/j.1365-2125.1990.tb03818.x. PMC 1368250. PMID 2291871. Wikidata Q39063279.
- Hui-Ming Lin; Barnett, Matthew Philip Greig; Roy, Nicole Clémence; Joyce, Nigel Ian; Shuotun Zhu; Kelly Armstrong; Helsby, Nuala Ann; Ferguson, Lynnette Robin; Rowan, Daryl D. (2010). "Metabolomic analysis identifies inflammatory and noninflammatory metabolic effects of genetic modification in a mouse model of Crohn's disease". Journal of Proteome Research. 9 (4): 1965–1975. doi:10.1021/pr901130s. PMID 20141220. Wikidata Q43169057.
