= The Top 100 Drugs =

21st-century book about pharmacology

The Top 100 Drugs: Clinical Pharmacology and Practical Prescribing
- First edition
- Language: English
- Subject: Pharmacology
- Publisher: Churchill Livingstone, Elsevier
- Publication date: 1st 2014, 2nd 2018, 3rd 2022
- Publication place: United Kingdom
- Pages: 325
- ISBN: 978-0-3238-3445-2

The Top 100 Drugs: Clinical Pharmacology and Practical Prescribing is a pocket-size medical manual focusing on the most commonly prescribed medicines by the British National Health Service (NHS). It was first published by Churchill Livingstone, Elsevier, in 2014, revised in a second edition in 2018, and again in 2022 in a third edition. It is authored by four clinical pharmacologists from St George's Hospital, London; Andrew Hitchings, Dagan Lonsdale, Daniel Burrage and Emma Baker.

The drugs are described in alphabetical order, with each drug or drug class on a double page. Each is subsequently explained in terms of clinical pharmacology and practical prescribing. Intravenous fluids are dealt with later in the book, followed by a self-assessment.

The book received a review in Pulse, and in 2018 was listed as an essential reference book for junior doctors by the Pharmaceutical Journal.

== Development and publication ==
The Top 100 Drugs is a medical manual which aims to reduce risks in prescribing. It includes a list of commonly prescribed medicines by the British NHS, for undergraduate and postgraduate medical education in the UK. It was first published as an e-book by Churchill Livingstone, Elsevier, in 2014. A second edition was published in 2018.

The first edition was based on the 100 most frequently prescribed drugs by the NHS in 2006–2009, first described in the British Journal of Clinical Pharmacology in 2011 by Emma Baker, who identified the drugs with how they appear in the British National Formulary (BNF). The book is authored by Baker and three other clinical pharmacologists from St George's Hospital; Andrew Hitchings, Dagan Lonsdale and Daniel Burrage, and takes into account suggestions from junior doctors. The list was revised in 2015, using data collected from a larger dataset to check that no significant changes had occurred, and formed the basis of the second edition, in which 11 drugs were replaced and the number of self-assessment questions doubled. A third edition was released in 2022.

== Content ==
The book has 325 pages and being 180 mm (7.1 in) in height and 100 mm (3.9 in) width, it can fit in a pocket. There is a contents page, followed by a list of abbreviations and an introduction.

The introduction states how the most frequently prescribed drugs in primary and secondary care were identified. Each drug or class of drugs is listed in alphabetical order, displayed on a double page and explained in two sections; clinical pharmacology and practical prescribing. These are then divided into;

- Common indications: in which conditions the drug is used.
- Mechanism of action: the way the drug works.
- Important adverse effects: side effects.
- Warnings: cautions and reasons where the drug should not be used.
- Important interactions: effect with other drugs.
- Prescription: dose and route of administration of drug.
- Administration: how the drug is given.
- Communication: information required by people.
- Monitoring: checks needed for each drug.
- Cost: mostly highlighting whether a drug is expensive or inexpensive.
- Clinical tips: a useful fact from the authors' experience.

The pharmacology of a drug or drug class is presented with guidance on prescribing. A drug can also be located by organ system or by clinical indication. Intravenous fluids are dealt with towards the end of the book, followed by a self assessment and an index. Unlike the original list, the second includes the newer diabetic drugs, blood thinners and anti-epileptics such as levetiracetam.

== Reception ==
In 2014, the book received a review from a general practitioner in Pulse, in which they felt it to be aimed towards those unfamiliar with prescribing, but useful as an aid to revising drugs. It was mentioned in the International Journal of Clinical Skills, and in 2018, the Pharmaceutical Journal listed the book in their "nine essential resources for preregistration trainees".
