= Emma Baker (clinical pharmacologist) =

British professor of clinical pharmacology

Emma Baker FRCP
- Education: University of Edinburgh
- Known for: Past executive editor of the British Journal of Clinical Pharmacology; Director of the UK's first BSc in clinical pharmacology; Clinical vice president of the British Pharmacological Society; Training programme director at Health Education England
- Medical career
- Profession: Physician
- Institutions: Salford Royal Hospital; Manchester University; St George's Hospital
- Sub-specialties: Clinical pharmacology; Respiratory medicine
- Research: Commonly prescribed medicines
- Notable works: The Top 100 Drugs: Clinical Pharmacology and Practical Prescribing (2015)

Emma Harriet Baker is a British professor of clinical pharmacology and consultant physician in internal medicine at St George's Hospital, London. She has a specialist interest in people who have multiple medical conditions at the same time and take several medications, with a particular focus on lung disease. She is director of the UK's first BSc in clinical pharmacology, clinical vice president of the British Pharmacological Society and training programme director at Health Education England.

Baker was executive editor of the British Journal of Clinical Pharmacology for 10 years. Her research led to the publication of The Top 100 Drugs: Clinical Pharmacology and Practical Prescribing (2014 and 2018) after identifying the most important and commonly prescribed drugs in the NHS.

During the first wave of the COVID-19 pandemic in the UK, she was a frontline healthcare professional on respiratory wards. She is listed as a principal investigator in the Cambridge COVID-19 trials.

After being elected best teacher 1998–2002 by her medical students, her hands feature alongside those of Edward Jenner, John Hunter and others in the sculpture titled "Handing on Skills, Ideas and Ideals", unveiled in 2002 at St George's to celebrate its 250-year anniversary of medical training.

== Medical career ==
Emma H. Baker graduated from the University of Edinburgh in 1988. During a junior work placement at Salford's Hope Hospital, she met Leslie Turnberg (later president of the Royal College of Physicians), who persuaded her to enter an academic career and pursue a doctorate. She subsequently earned her PhD in 1996 from Manchester University.

She developed a specialist interest in people who have multiple medical conditions at the same time and take several medications, with a particular focus on lung disease. Before being appointed consultant in internal medicine at St George's Hospital in 2000, she was one of professor Joe Collier's lecturers.

She became the director of the UK's first BSc in clinical pharmacology. She pointed out in an interview with the British Medical Journal in 2020, that not doing a BSc as a medical student herself reduced her choices in medicine. She is also clinical vice president of the British Pharmacological Society and is Health Education England's training programme director.

=== Writing ===
For a decade she was an executive editor of the British Journal of Clinical Pharmacology.

Her research led to identifying 100 most important and commonly prescribed drugs in the NHS. After being asked by students to provide a concise and practical collection of these medicines, she co-authored The Top 100 Drugs: Clinical Pharmacology and Practical Prescribing, the first edition appearing in 2015 and a second in 2019.

Her research has also included looking at the effect of raised glucose levels in people with COPD.

=== COVID-19 ===
During the first wave of the COVID-19 pandemic in the UK, she was a frontline healthcare professional on respiratory wards. In December 2020, she organised her clinical pharmacology BSc students, in their second year of university, to be trained to perform mass COVID-19 testing for fellow students to allow them to go home for Christmas. She is listed as a principal investigator in the Cambridge COVID-19 trials.

== Awards and honours ==
Undergraduate students at St George's elected Baker as best teacher for 1998 to 2002. As a result, her hands feature alongside those of Edward Jenner's, John Hunter's, Robert Boyd's, Joe Collier's and others in an English walnut sculpture by Elona Bennett titled "Handing on Skills, Ideas and Ideals", unveiled in the presence of the Queen on 2 December 2002 at St George's to celebrate 250 years of medical training at the medical school.

In 2003, she received the National Teaching Fellowship of the Higher Education Academy and has received further undergraduate teaching prizes from her students.

== Selected publications ==
=== Books ===
- Respiratory Medicine: Clinical Cases Uncovered. New York: John Wiley & Sons. 2010. ISBN 978-1-4051-5895-4. OCLC 1185681988. (Co-author)
- Prescribing Scenarios at a Glance. Chichester, West Sussex; Malden, MA: Wiley Blackwell. 2014. ISBN 978-1-118-57086-9. OCLC 900221762. (Co-author)
- The Top 100 Drugs: Clinical Pharmacology and Practical Prescribing. Edinburgh: Churchill-Livingstone; Elsevier. 2015. ISBN 978-0-7020-7442-4. OCLC 883427729. (Co-author)

=== Articles ===
- Baker, Emma H.; Wood, David M.; Brennan, Amanda L.; Clark, Nicholas; Baines, Deborah L.; Philips, Barbara J. (2006). "Hyperglycaemia and pulmonary infection". Proceedings of the Nutrition Society. 65 (3): 227–235. doi:10.1079/PNS2006499. ISSN 1475-2719. PMID 16923307. (Co-author)
- Garnett, James P.; Baker, Emma H.; Baines, Deborah L. (1 November 2012). "Sweet talk: insights into the nature and importance of glucose transport in lung epithelium". European Respiratory Journal. 40 (5): 1269–1276. doi:10.1183/09031936.00052612. ISSN 0903-1936. PMID 22878875. (Co-author)
- Baker, Emma; Pryce Roberts, Adele; Wilde, Kirsty; Walton, Hannah; Suri, Sati; Rull, Gurvinder; Webb, Andrew (2011). "Development of a core drug list towards improving prescribing education and reducing errors in the UK". British Journal of Clinical Pharmacology. 71 (2): 190–198. doi:10.1111/j.1365-2125.2010.03823.x. ISSN 1365-2125. PMC 3040539. PMID 21219399. (Co-author)
- Audi, S.; Burrage, D. R.; Lonsdale, D. O.; Pontefract, S.; Coleman, J. J.; Hitchings, A. W.; Baker, E. H. (November 2018). "The 'top 100' drugs and classes in England: an updated 'starter formulary' for trainee prescribers". British Journal of Clinical Pharmacology. 84 (11): 2562–2571. doi:10.1111/bcp.13709. ISSN 0306-5251. PMC 6177714. PMID 29975799. (Co-author)
