= Fellowship of Postgraduate Medicine =

British non-profit organisation

- Founded: 1918
- Founder: Sir William Osler
- Type: Educational
- Purpose: General Medicine
- Location: London, United Kingdom
- Region served: United Kingdom
- Key people: Donald Singer, President; Tim Nicholson, Hon. Treasurer; Wade Dimitri, Hon. Secretary, Y. Tony Yang, Trustee
- Website: thefpmuk.wordpress.com

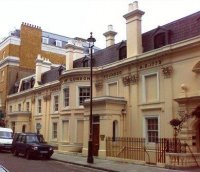
The Fellowship of Postgraduate Medicine Building in London

The Fellowship of Postgraduate Medicine (FPM) is a British non-profit organisation that was founded after World War I and pioneered the development of postgraduate educational programmes in all branches of medicine. It was founded in late 1918 as the Inter-allied Fellowship of Medicine with Sir William Osler as its president. In the autumn of 1919, Osler merged the IAFM with the Postgraduate Medical Association of which he had been the founding President since 1911. In October 1919, Osler was appointed President of the combined Fellowship of Medicine and the Postgraduate Medical Association and Sir William Osler became the first president of the new organisation. The fellowship is supported by national and international fellows with expertise in the practice of medicine, medical education, clinical research, and related disciplines. The office and meeting rooms of the fellowship are in Central London. It is governed by a council that meets quarterly.

== Current activities ==
The fellowship aims to achieve its objectives through publications, organising educational meetings and supporting other relevant activities.

- The fellowship has since 1925 published the international journal, the Postgraduate Medical Journal.
- In 2012 the Fellowship launched a new international journal:Health Policy and Technology, published on the Fellowship's behalf by Elsevier.

The fellowship hosts a range of seminars and conferences, including in partnership with its journals..

- In 2008, the fellowship supported the 2nd International Symposium on Progress on Personalising Medicines.
- The fellowship also supported in 2011 the 3rd International Symposium on Progress on Personalising Medicines, in partnership with the British Pharmacological Society.
- Since 2009, the fellowship has also arranged joint events with the Medical Society of London.
- January 2009: inaugural joint debate on NICE and personalising medicine, between FPM Fellow Munir Pirmohamed and Sir Michael Rawlins.
- February 2012: a debate on the challenges to the future of electronic health records.
- January 2014: updates on cardiovascular disease - sudden cardiac death and intravascular treatment for heart valve disease.
- The first FPM summer public lecture was delivered on 6 June 2011 by FPM Fellow Allister Vale on 'Chemical terrorism: what the clinician needs to know'.
- On 1 October 2015, the fellowship organised a conference to mark the 90th anniversary of the launch of the Postgraduate Medical Journal.
- In December 2017, with its Health Policy and Technology journal and the Cardiovascular Research Trust, the Fellowship held a conference in London on health policy for preventing heart disease.
- In May 2018, jointly with the Postgraduate Medical Journal and the University of Hong Kong, the fellowship organised a clinical updates session at the Hong Kong Medical Forum.
- On 7 December 2018, the fellowship organised a conference on excellence in clinical practice at the Royal College of Physicians in London to mark the centenary of its founding.
- In June 2019, jointly with its Health Policy and Technology journal, the fellowship organised a conference on European Cooperation in Healthcare at Erasmus University in Rotterdam.

The fellowship has provided major support for the International Hippocrates Prize for Poetry and Medicine.

== Honorary fellows ==
- Dannie Abse CBE
- John Hopewell FRCS
- David Ingram FBCS
- D. Geraint James FRCP

== Official journals ==
- Postgraduate Medical Journal. Monthly: established 1925.
- Health Policy and Technology. Quarterly: established January 2012.

== See also ==
- Royal Society of Medicine
- Royal College of Physicians
