= Marketo (disambiguation) =

Marketos may refer to:

== Peoples ==
- Jake Marketo (1989-), Australian rugby league footballer
- Michael Marketo (1959-), Australian rugby league footballer

== See also ==
- Marketo, former software company, now part of Adobe
- Spyros Marketos (1931-2012), Greek physician and professor
