= Flunitrazepam =

Benzodiazepine sedative

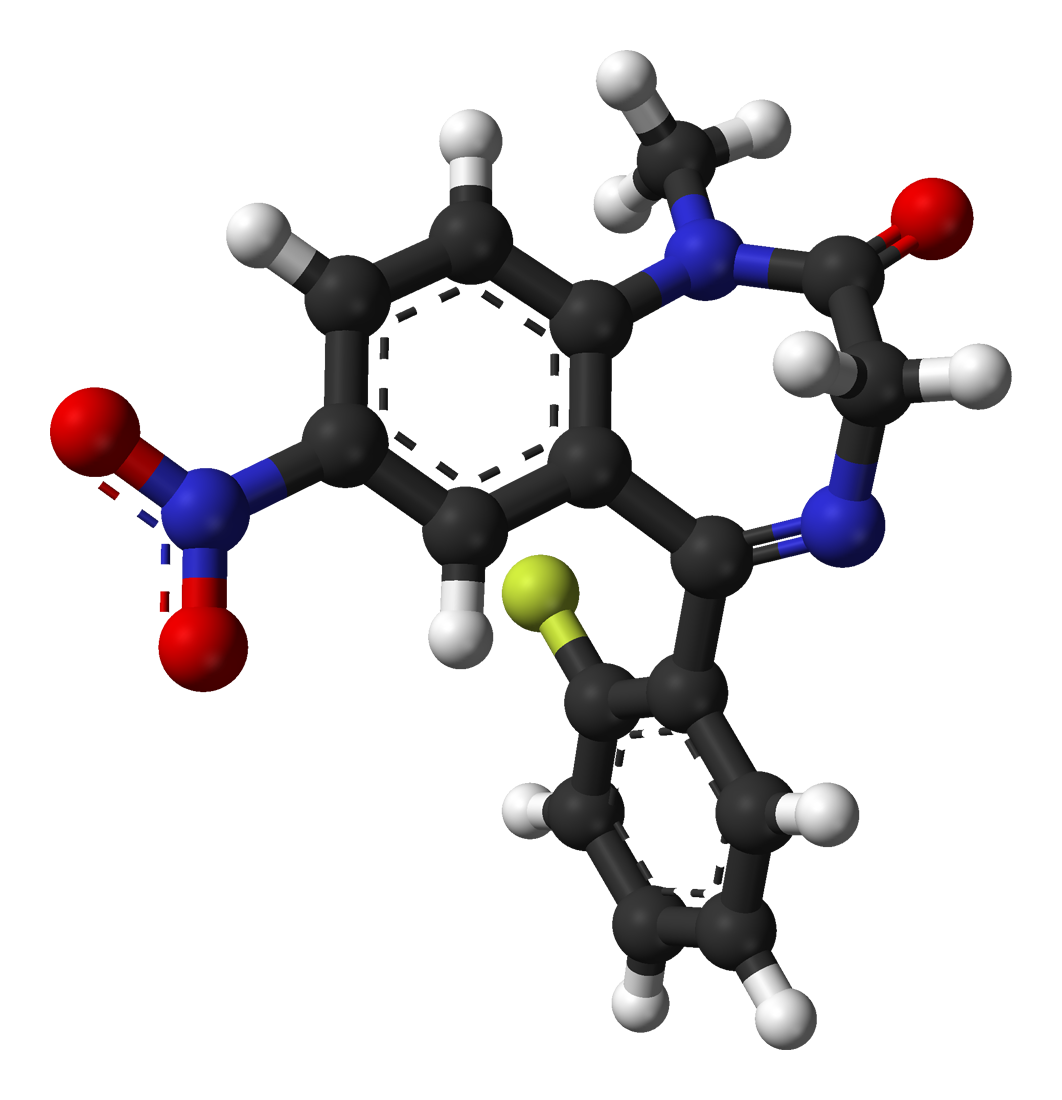

Clinical data
- Pronunciation: /ˌfluːnɪˈtræzɪpæm/
- Trade names: Rohypnol
- Other names: roofies, floonies
- Pregnancy category: AU: C
- Addiction liability: High
- Routes of administration: Oral
- Drug class: Benzodiazepine
- ATC code: N05CD03 (WHO)

Legal status
- Legal status: AU: S8 (Controlled drug); BR: Class B1 (Psychoactive drugs); CA: Schedule I; DE: Anlage III (Special prescription form required); UK: Class C; US: Schedule IV (Schedule I trafficking penalties, however); UN: Psychotropic Schedule III; SE: Förteckning II In general: ℞ (Prescription only)

Pharmacokinetic data
- Bioavailability: 64–77% (by mouth); 50% (suppository)
- Metabolism: Liver
- Metabolites: 7-aminoflunitrazepam, desmethylflunitrazepam and 3-hydroxydesmethylflunitrazepam
- Elimination half-life: 18–26 hours
- Excretion: Kidney

Identifiers
- IUPAC name: 5-(2-fluorophenyl)-1-methyl-7-nitro-1H-benzo[e][1,4]diazepin-2(3H)-one
- CAS Number: 1622-62-4
- PubChem CID: 3380
- IUPHAR/BPS: 4193
- DrugBank: DB01544
- ChemSpider: 3263
- UNII: 620X0222FQ
- KEGG: D01230
- ChEBI: CHEBI:31622
- ChEMBL: ChEMBL13280
- CompTox Dashboard (EPA): DTXSID7023065
- ECHA InfoCard: 100.015.089

Chemical and physical data
- Formula: C_{16}H_{12}FN_{3}O_{3}
- Molar mass: 313.288 g·mol^{−1}
- 3D model (JSmol): Interactive image
- Melting point: 170–172 °C (338–342 °F)
- SMILES: CN1C(=O)CN=C(c2ccccc2F)c2cc([N+](=O)[O-])ccc21
- InChI: InChI=1S/C16H12FN3O3/c1-19-14-7-6-10(20(22)23)8-12(14)16(18-9-15(19)21)11-4-2-3-5-13(11)17/h2-8H,9H2,1H3; Key:PPTYJKAXVCCBDU-UHFFFAOYSA-N

Flunitrazepam, sold under the brand name Rohypnol among others, is a benzodiazepine used to treat severe insomnia and assist with anesthesia. As with other hypnotics, flunitrazepam has been advised to be prescribed only for short-term use or by those with chronic insomnia on an occasional basis.

Flunitrazepam was patented in 1962 and came into medical use in 1974. Nicknamed "roofies" or "floonies", it is widely known for its use as a date rape drug.

== Medical uses ==
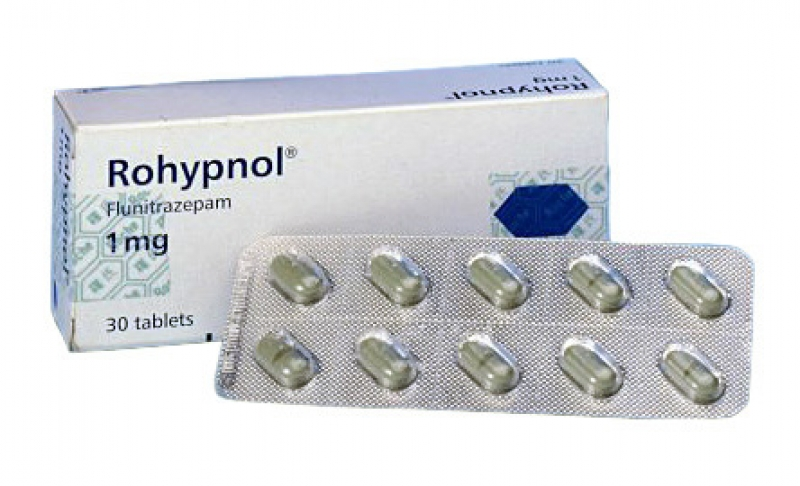
Rohypnol 1 mg tablets

In countries where this drug is used, it is used for treatment of severe cases of sleeping problems, and in some countries as a preanesthetic agent. These were also the uses for which it was originally studied.

It has also been administered as a concurrent dose for patients that are taking ketamine. Flunitrazepam lowers the side effects of the anesthetic (ketamine), resulting in less confusion in awakening states, less negative influence on pulse rate, and fewer fluctuations in blood pressure.

== Adverse effects ==
Adverse effects of flunitrazepam include dependency, both physical and psychological; reduced sleep quality resulting in somnolence; and overdose, resulting in excessive sedation, impairment of balance and speech, respiratory depression or coma, and possibly death. Because of the latter, flunitrazepam is commonly used in suicide among the elderly. When used in late pregnancy, it might cause hypotonia of the fetus.

=== Dependence ===
Flunitrazepam, as with other benzodiazepines, can lead to drug dependence. Discontinuation may result in benzodiazepine withdrawal syndrome, characterised by seizures, psychosis, insomnia, and anxiety. Rebound insomnia, worse than baseline insomnia, typically occurs after discontinuation of flunitrazepam even from short-term single nightly dose therapy.

=== Paradoxical effects ===
Flunitrazepam may cause a paradoxical reaction in some individuals, including anxiety, aggressiveness, agitation, confusion, disinhibition, loss of impulse control, talkativeness, violent behavior, and even convulsions. Paradoxical adverse effects may even lead to criminal behaviour.

=== Hypotonia ===
Benzodiazepines such as flunitrazepam are lipophilic and rapidly penetrate membranes and, therefore, rapidly cross over into the placenta with significant uptake of the drug. Use of benzodiazepines including flunitrazepam in late pregnancy, especially high doses, may result in hypotonia, also known as floppy baby syndrome.

=== Other ===
Flunitrazepam impairs cognitive functions. This may appear as lack of concentration, confusion and anterograde amnesia—the inability to create memories while under the influence. It can be described as a hangover-like effect which can persist to the next day. It also impairs psychomotor functions similar to other benzodiazepines and nonbenzodiazepine hypnotic drugs; falls and hip fractures were frequently reported. The combination with alcohol increases these impairments. Partial, but incomplete tolerance develops to these impairments.

Other adverse effects include:

- Slurred speech
- Gastrointestinal disturbances, lasting 12 or more hours
- Vomiting
- Respiratory depression in higher doses

=== Special precautions ===
Benzodiazepines require special precaution if used in the elderly, during pregnancy, in children, in alcohol- or drug-dependent individuals, and in individuals with comorbid psychiatric disorders.

Impairment of driving skills with a resultant increased risk of road traffic accidents is probably the most important adverse effect. This side-effect is not unique to flunitrazepam but also occurs with other hypnotic drugs. Flunitrazepam seems to have a particularly high risk of road traffic accidents compared to other hypnotic drugs. Extreme caution should be exercised by drivers after taking flunitrazepam.

== Interactions ==
The use of flunitrazepam in combination with alcohol synergizes the adverse effects, and can lead to toxicity and death.

== Overdose ==
Flunitrazepam is a drug that is frequently involved in drug intoxication, including overdose. Overdose of flunitrazepam may result in excessive sedation, or impairment of balance or speech. This may progress in severe overdoses to respiratory depression or coma and possibly death. The risk of overdose is increased if flunitrazepam is taken in combination with CNS depressants such as alcohol and opioids. Flunitrazepam overdose responds to the GABA_{A} receptor antagonist flumazenil, which thus can be used as a treatment.

== Detection ==
As of 2016, blood tests can identify flunitrazepam at concentrations of as low as 4 nanograms per millilitre; the elimination half-life of the drug is 4–12 hours. For urine samples, metabolites can be identified for 60 hours to 28 days, depending on the dose and analytical method used. Hair and saliva can also be analyzed; hair is useful when a long time has transpired since ingestion, and saliva for workplace drug tests.

Flunitrazepam can be measured in blood or plasma to confirm a diagnosis of poisoning in hospitalized patients, provide evidence in an impaired driving arrest, or assist in a medicolegal death investigation. Blood or plasma flunitrazepam concentrations are usually in a range of 5–20 μg/L in persons receiving the drug therapeutically as a nighttime hypnotic, 10–50 μg/L in those arrested for impaired driving and 100–1000 μg/L in victims of acute fatal overdosage. Urine is often the preferred specimen for routine substance use monitoring purposes. The presence of 7-aminoflunitrazepam, a pharmacologically active metabolite and in vitro degradation product, is useful for confirmation of flunitrazepam ingestion. In postmortem specimens, the parent drug may have been entirely degraded over time to 7-aminoflunitrazepam. Other metabolites include desmethylflunitrazepam and 3-hydroxydesmethylflunitrazepam.

== Pharmacology ==
The main pharmacological effects of flunitrazepam are the enhancement of GABA, an inhibitory neurotransmitter, at various GABA receptors. All benzodiazepines work by enhancing the effect of GABA receptors, which, when active, allow chloride ions to enter the neuron. Negative ions such as chloride inhibit the ability of neurons to fire. It is this stimulation of GABA receptors which is responsible for the depressant effects of benzodiazepines. Flunitrazepam shows high affinity for the α-5 subunit of the GABA-A receptor, which causes some of its unique side effects, such as amnesia.

While 80% of flunitrazepam that is taken orally is absorbed, bioavailability in suppository form is closer to 50%.

Flunitrazepam has a long half-life of 18–26 hours, which means that flunitrazepam's effects after nighttime administration persist throughout the next day. This is due to the production of active metabolites. These metabolites further increase the duration of drug action compared to benzodiazepines that produce nonactive metabolites.

Flunitrazepam is lipophilic and is metabolised by the liver via oxidative pathways. The enzyme CYP3A4 is the main enzyme in its phase 1 metabolism in human liver microsomes.

== Chemistry ==
Flunitrazepam is classed as a nitro-benzodiazepine. It is the fluorinated N-methyl derivative of nitrazepam. Other nitro-benzodiazepines include nitrazepam (the parent compound), nimetazepam (methylamino derivative) and clonazepam (2ʹ-chlorinated derivative).

Flunitrazepam has a melting point of around 170 degrees Celsius.

== History ==
Flunitrazepam was discovered at Roche as part of the benzodiazepine work led by Leo Sternbach; the patent application was filed in 1960 and it was first marketed in 1972.

Due to use of the drug for date rape and recreation, in 1998 Roche modified the formulation to give lower doses, make it less soluble, and add a blue dye for easier detection in drinks. It was never marketed in the United States, and by 2016 had been withdrawn from the markets in Spain, France, Norway, Germany, and the United Kingdom.

== Society and culture ==
=== Recreational and illegal uses ===
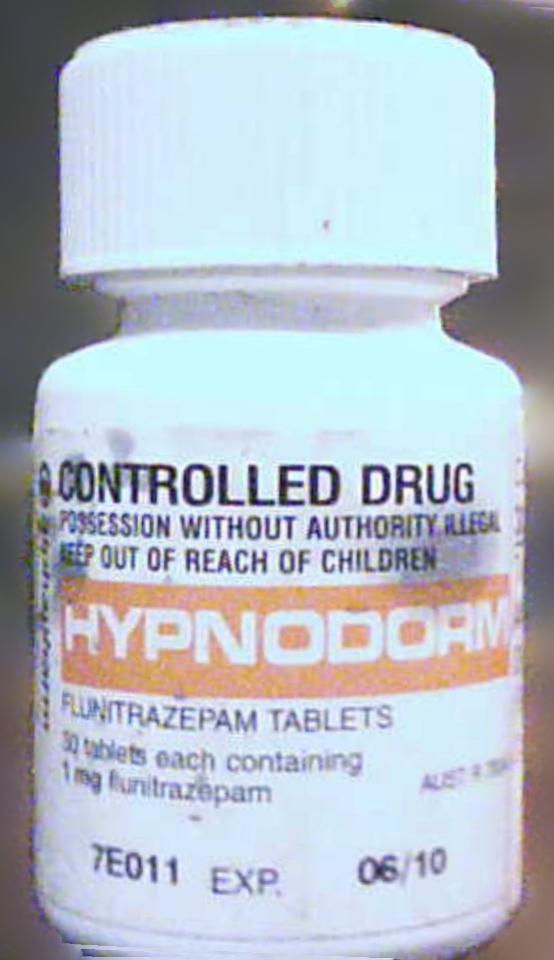
Hypnodorm 1 mg flunitrazepam tablets, Australia

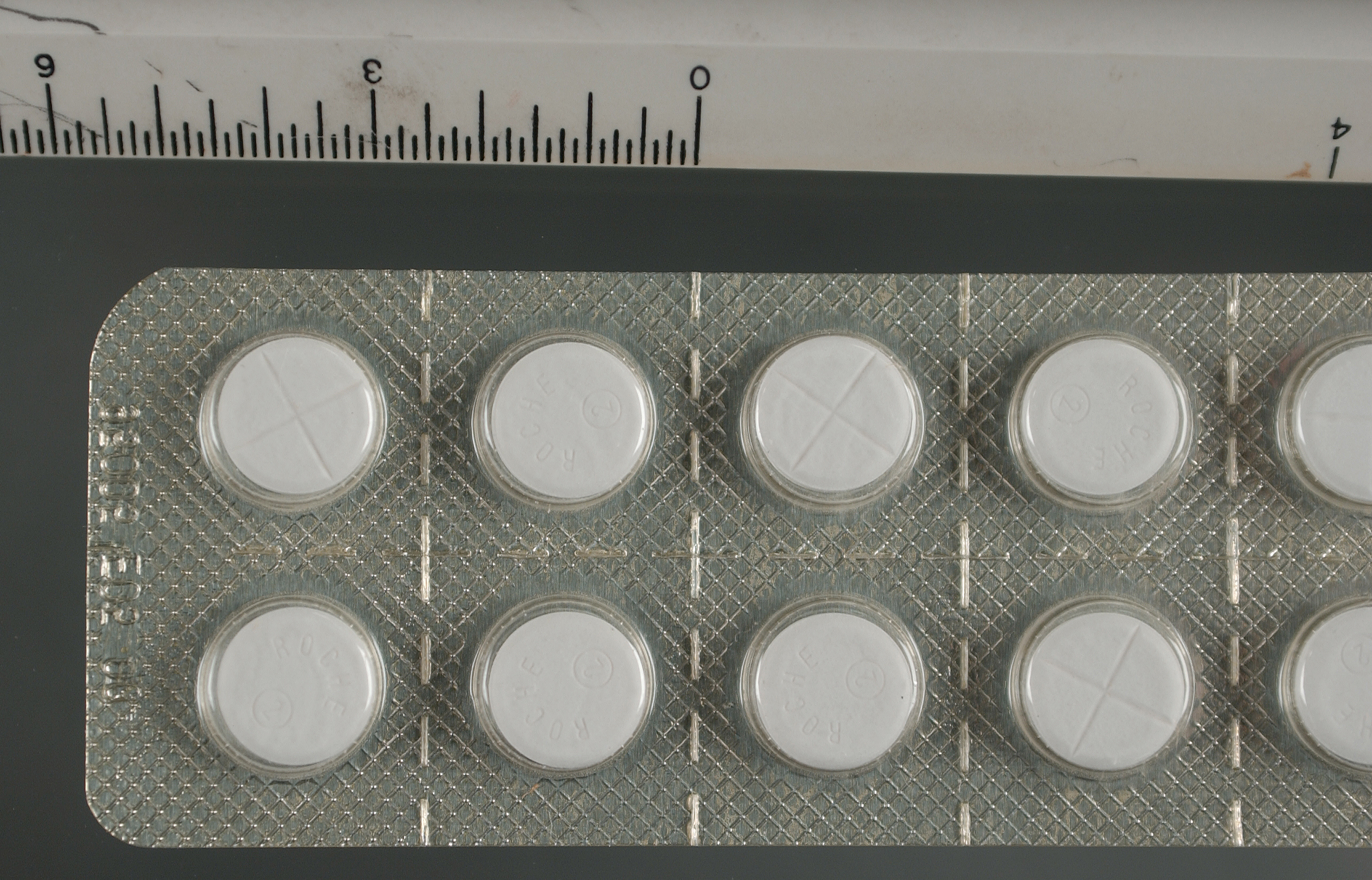
Rohypnol

==== Recreational use ====
A 1989 article in the European Journal of Clinical Pharmacology reports that benzodiazepines accounted for 52% of prescription forgeries in Sweden, suggesting that benzodiazepines were a major prescription drug class of abuse. Nitrazepam accounted for 13% of forged prescriptions, and accounted for 44% of forgeries specifically for benzodiazepines while flunitrazepam, diazepam, and oxazepam accounted for the majority of the rest of benzodiazepine forgeries. Prescription forgeries for other benzodiazepines marketed in Sweden (alprazolam, clonazepam, lorazepam, clobazam, and bromazepam) were negligible. When calculated in relation to utilization, the narcotic analgesics codeine, pentazocine, and ketobemidone were at the top of the list for the highest number of overall prescription forgeries, suggesting a higher abuse potential of these drugs. In neighboring Finland, temazepam accounts for roughly 40–50% benzodiazepine prescription forgeries annually, while flunitrazepam accounts for approximately ~15% of benzodiazepine prescription forgeries.

Flunitrazepam and other sedative hypnotic drugs are detected frequently in cases of people suspected of driving under the influence of drugs. Other benzodiazepines and nonbenzodiazepines (anxiolytic or hypnotic) such as zolpidem and zopiclone (as well as cyclopyrrolones, imidazopyridines, and pyrazolopyrimidines) are also found in high numbers of suspected drugged drivers. Many drivers have blood levels far exceeding the therapeutic dose range, suggesting a high degree of potential for addiction for benzodiazepines and similar drugs.

==== Suicide ====
In studies in Sweden, flunitrazepam was the second most common drug used in suicides, being found in about 16% of cases. In a retrospective Swedish study of 1,587 deaths, in 159 cases benzodiazepines were found. In suicides when benzodiazepines were implicated, the benzodiazepines flunitrazepam and nitrazepam occurred in significantly higher concentrations compared to natural deaths. Of the 159 deaths where any benzodiazepines were found, 4 deaths were caused by benzodiazepines alone (in the other 155 cases, benzodiazepines were combined with something else). One conclusion of the study was that flunitrazepam and nitrazepam might be more toxic than other benzodiazepines available in the Swedish market.

==== Drug-facilitated sexual assault ====
Flunitrazepam is known to induce anterograde amnesia in sufficient doses; individuals are unable to remember certain events that they experienced while under the influence of the drug, which complicates investigations. This effect could be particularly dangerous if flunitrazepam is used to aid in the commission of sexual assault; victims may be unable to clearly recall the assault, the assailant, or the events surrounding the assault.

While use of flunitrazepam in sexual assault has been prominent in the media, as of 2015 it appears to be fairly rare, and use of alcohol and other benzodiazepine drugs in date rape appears to be a larger but underreported problem.

In a 2001 study, the benzodiazepines midazolam and temazepam were the two most common benzodiazepines utilized for date rape.

==== Drug-facilitated robbery ====
In the United Kingdom, the use of flunitrazepam and other "date rape" drugs have also been connected to stealing from sedated victims. An activist quoted by a British newspaper estimated that up to 2,000 individuals are robbed each year after consuming drinks spiked with powerful sedatives, making drug-assisted robbery a more commonly reported problem than drug-assisted rape.

During Brazil’s match against Argentina at the 1990 FIFA World Cup, footballer Branco was drugged with flunitrazepam by assistant coach Galíndez under Carlos Bilardo’s orders; in 2004, Diego Maradona acknowledged the trap and said he knew everything, and Bilardo admitted the trick as early as 1990, stating that “I cannot say it did not happen”.

=== Regional use ===
Flunitrazepam is a Schedule III drug under the international Convention on Psychotropic Substances of 1971.

- In Australia, as of 2013 the drug was authorized for prescribing for severe cases of insomnia but was restricted as a Schedule 8 medicine.
- In France, as of 2016 flunitrazepam was not marketed.
- In Germany, as of 2016 flunitrazepam is an Anlage III Betäubungsmittel (controlled substance which is allowed to be marketed and prescribed by physicians under specific provisions) and is available on a special narcotic drug prescription as the Rohypnol 1 mg film-coated tablets and several generic preparations (November 2016).
- In Ireland, flunitrazepam is a Schedule 3 controlled substance with strict restrictions.
- In Japan, flunitrazepam is marketed by Japanese pharmaceutical company Chugai under the trade name Rohypnol and is indicated for the treatment of insomnia as well as used for preanesthetic medication.
- In Mexico, Rohypnol is legally available.
- In Norway, on January 1, 2003, flunitrazepam was moved up one level in the schedule of controlled drugs and, on August 1, 2004, the manufacturer Roche removed Rohypnol from the market there altogether.
- In South Africa, Rohypnol is classified as a Schedule 6 drug. It is available by prescription only, and restricted to 1 mg doses.

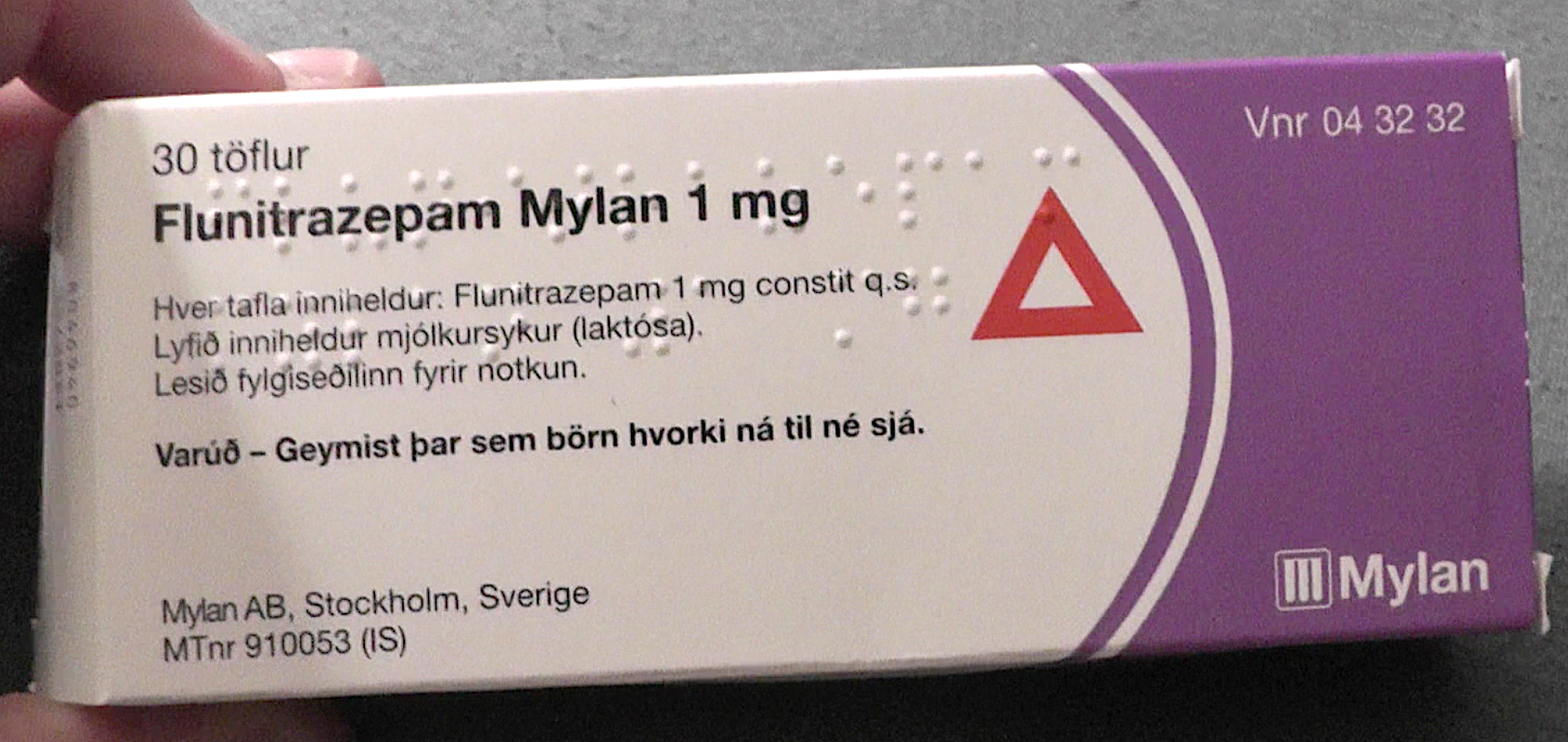
Icelandic Flunitrazepam

- In Iceland, flunitrazepam is a controlled substance available from Mylan. It is prescribed for severe insomnia and is sometimes used before surgery to induce a calm, relaxed state of mind for the patient.
- In Sweden, flunitrazepam is a List II drug (substances with medicinal uses) under the Narcotics Control Act (1968). It was previously available from Mylan, but has been removed from the market in January 2020.
- In the United Kingdom, flunitrazepam is not licensed for medical use and is a controlled drug under Schedule 3 and Class C.
- In the United States, the drug has not been approved by the Food and Drug Administration and is considered to be an illegal drug; as of 2016 it is Schedule IV. 21 U.S.C. § 841 and 21 U.S.C. § 952 provide for punishment for the importation and distribution of up to 20 years in prison and a fine; possession is punishable by three years and a fine. Travelers travelling into the United States are limited to a 30-day supply. The drug must be declared to US Customs upon arrival. If a valid prescription cannot be produced, the drug may be subject to Customs search and seizure, and the traveler may face criminal charges or deportation.

=== Names ===
Flunitrazepam is marketed under many brand names in the countries where it is legal. It also has many street names, including "roofie" and "ruffie". It is also known as Circles, Forget Me Pill, La Rocha, Lunch Money Drug, Mexican Valium, Pingus, R2, and Roach 2.
