= Munir Pirmohamed =

British pharmacologist

Professor Sir Munir Pirmohamed is a British clinical pharmacologist and geneticist. Since 2007 he has been the NHS Chair of Pharmacogenetics at the University of Liverpool.

== Background ==
He attended the former St Paul’s School and Peterborough Technical College.

Pirmohamed studied medicine at the University of Liverpool from 1980 to 1985. He was awarded a PhD in pharmacology in 1993, and began working as a consultant physician at the Royal Liverpool University Hospital in 1996. Pirmohamed gained the position of Personal Chair in Clinical Pharmacology at The University of Liverpool in 2001. He went on to become the NHS Chair of Pharmacogenetics in 2007 and the David Weatherall Chair of Medicine at the University of Liverpool in 2013. He was a member of the Commission on Human Medicines and chair of its Pharmacovigilance Expert Advisory Group from 2005 to 2020 and was appointed chair of the commission in 2021,

He is Director of the Centre for Drug Safety Science, Director of the Wolfson Centre of Personalised Medicine, and Director of the MRC Clinical Pharmacology Training Scheme, all at the University of Liverpool. In addition, he is Director of HDR North, part of HDR UK.

Alongside these responsibilities, Pirmohamed is a non-executive director for NHS England/Improvement, a member of the governing council of the Medical Research Council, a medical trustee for the British Heart Foundation, and was president of the British Pharmacological Society from January 2020 to December 2021. He is president-elect of the Association of Physicians for 2022, and will become president in 2023.

In 2022, he chaired a committee that produced a report, Personalised prescribing, on behalf of the Royal College of Physicians of London and the British Pharmacological Society, which advocates the implementation of pharmacogenomics into the UK NHS.

== Research ==
Clinical Pharmacology, Pharmacogenetics and drug safety are the main areas of Pirmohamed's research. With a particular focus on adverse drug reactions, their role in improving prescription choices and the development of genetic tests for personalised medicine. He has published over 600 articles. He is included the 2021 list of highly cited researchers by Clarivate, and has been ranked number 1 expert in pharmacogenetics worldwide by Expertscape.

== Awards ==
Pirmohamed is an inaugural NIHR Senior Investigator and is a Fellow of the Academy of Medical Sciences. Pirmohamed has received the William Withering Medal from the Royal College of Physicians and the IPIT award for Public Service from the University of North Carolina in the US. and the Bionow Outstanding Contribution award for 2021. He was knighted the in Queen's Birthday Honours in June 2015 for services to Medicine.

== Professional memberships ==
- British Medical Association
- British Pharmacological Society
- Association of Physicians
- Medical Council on Alcohol
- Medical Research Society
- Fellowship of Postgraduate Medicine
- Academy of Medical Sciences

== Funding ==
Pirmohamed has been awarded funding from The UK Department of Health, NIHR, MRC, Wellcome Trust, Wolfson Foundation, and the EU FP7 programme funds .
