= C16H14FN3O =

The molecular formula C_{16}H_{14}FN_{3}O may refer to:

- Afloqualone
- 7-Aminoflunitrazepam
