= Emma Baker =

Emma Baker may refer to:

- Emma Baker (journalist) (born 1980), British television journalist and presenter
- Emma Baker (clinical pharmacologist), British professor of clinical pharmacology
- Emma Sophia Baker (1856–1943), Canadian psychologist
- Emma Fielding Baker (1828–1916), member of the Mohegan Pequot Indian tribe
