= David Webb (pharmacologist) =

British physician, scientist and pharmacologist

Professor David Webb CBE FRCP FRSE FMedSci
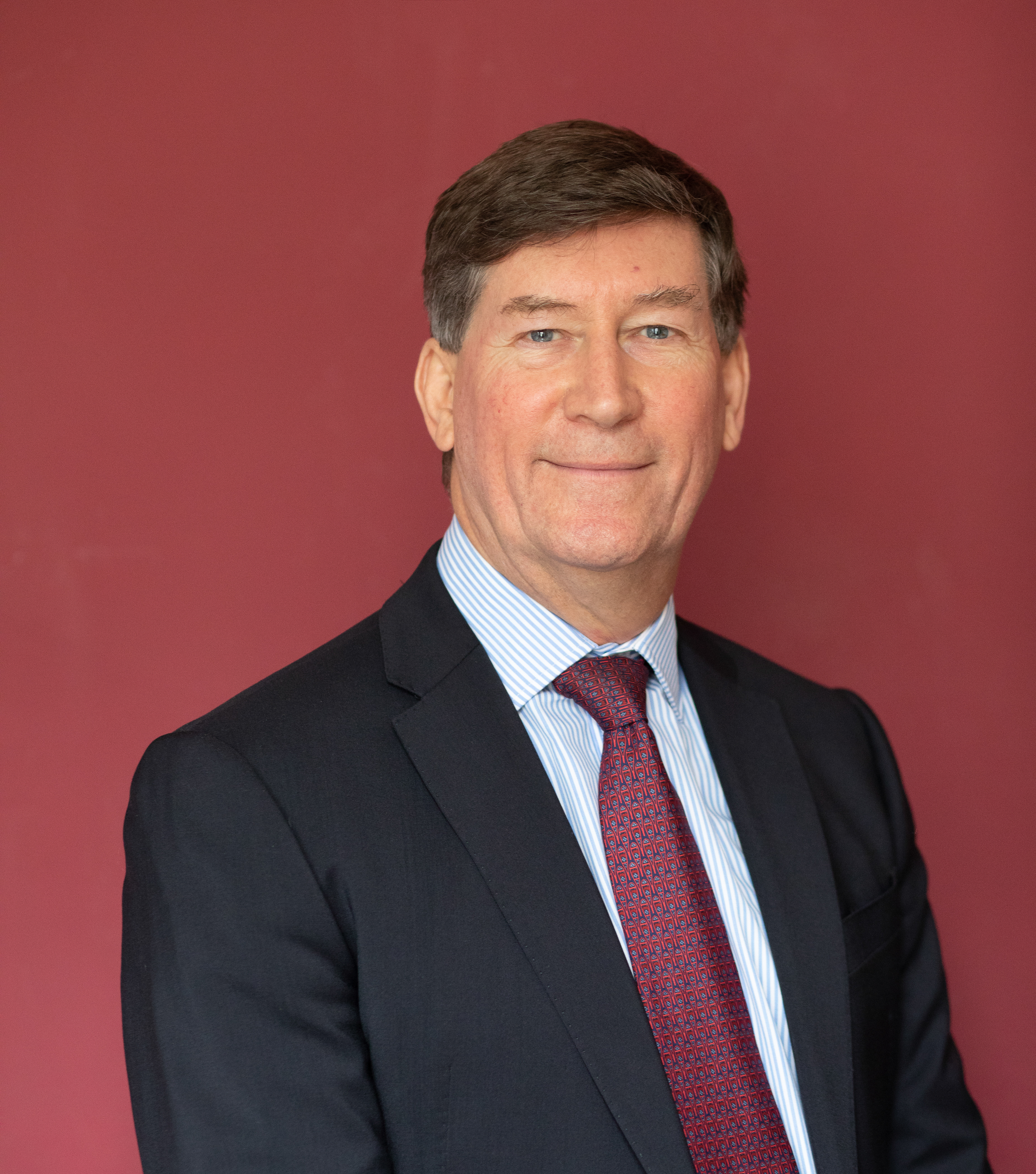
- Born: David John Webb; September 1, 1953 (age 71); Greenwich, London, England
- Education: Dulwich College
- Alma mater: The London Hospital Medical School
- Occupation: Clinical pharmacologist
- Employer: University of Edinburgh
- Children: 1
- Scientific career
- Institutions: University of Glasgow; St George’s Hospital & Medical School

David John Webb (born 1 September 1953) is a British physician, scientist and clinical pharmacologist, who currently holds the Christison Chair of Therapeutics and Clinical Pharmacology at the University of Edinburgh.

He was appointed to the Christison Chair of Therapeutics and Clinical Pharmacology at the University of Edinburgh in 1995, and from 1998 to 2001 he was Head of the University's Department of Medical Sciences there. He established its Centre for Cardiovascular Science in 2000.

== Early life and education ==
David Webb was born on 1 September 1953 to Alfred And Edna Webb, and was educated at Dulwich College before studying medicine at the London Hospital Medical School. Following junior appointments, Webb worked at the Medical Research Council Blood Pressure Unit in Glasgow and trained as a cardiovascular physician and clinical pharmacologist at St George's Hospital and Medical School.

== Career and research ==
Webb moved to a senior lectureship in medicine at the University of Edinburgh in 1990, where he directed its newly established Clinical Research Centre. He was appointed to the Christison Chair of Therapeutics and Clinical Pharmacology at the University of Edinburgh in 1995. He headed the Department of Medical Sciences and led a Wellcome Trust Cardiovascular Initiative from 1998 to 2001, then created and led the University's Centre for Cardiovascular Science from 2000 to 2004.

Webb has acted on behalf on several professional organisations: He served as clinical vice-president of the British Pharmacological Society from 1996 to 1998 and later as its president from 2016 to 2018; chair of the Royal College of Physicians' Committee on Clinical Pharmacology during 1998 and 1989; and chaired the British Pharmacological Society's committee of heads and professors of clinical pharmacology from 2004 to 2007. He became the vice-president of the Royal College of Physicians of Edinburgh in 2006 and served until 2009.

=== Advocation for clinical pharmacology and prescribing safety ===
In 2006, Webb advocated with colleagues against the decline of clinical pharmacology as a speciality within the United Kingdom, noting that the number of clinical pharmacologists had dropped by 24% from 1993 to 2003, whereas the number of practitioners in all other medical specialties had increased by 79%. He also participated in raising awareness about poor medical undergraduate prescribing skills and in 2009 he provided evidence to the United Kingdom select committee on patient safety regarding prescription errors, of which an excerpt is shown below:

It is widely recognised that newly qualified doctors are at the sharp end of prescribing, and that this work is largely unsupervised. Although junior doctors are protected from undertaking many high-risk practical procedures, they are able to prescribe powerful medicines from their first day of clinical work. Here, clinical pharmacists are well recognised to play a very important support and educational role. Nevertheless, there is a critical need to provide medical students with an undergraduate education and training in therapeutics and prescribing that prepares them effectively to fulfil this role, and to be able to develop as an effective prescriber thereafter. Essential support in prescribing can be provided, and several studies have suggested that the delivery of targeted education can improve prescribing performance and reduce prescription errors.

— Memorandum by Professor David Webb (PS 89)

This ultimately led to the creation and introduction by the British Pharmacological Society and UK Medical Schools Council of the Prescribing Safety Assessment, which is now taken by all undergraduate medical students in the United Kingdom.

=== Cardiovascular research ===
Webb's scientific research focuses on novel treatments for hypertension and cardiovascular risk, particularly with regards to blood vessel structure and function. His publications include first-in-human studies with renin inhibitors and endothelin antagonists, including exploration of the role of endothelin antagonists as treatment for vascular and renal disease. He has also contributed to the current understanding of arterial stiffness and its role in cardiovascular risk.

== Awards ==
Webb was elected a Fellow of the Royal College of Physicians in 1992, a Fellow of the Academy of Medical Sciences in 1999, and a Fellow of the Royal Society of Edinburgh in 2004. He is an honorary fellow of the British Pharmacological Society and of the Faculty of Pharmaceutical Physicians. He was appointed Commander of the Order of the British Empire (CBE) in the 2020 Birthday Honours for services to clinical pharmacology, research and education.
