= Kathleen Foley =

American physician

Dr. Kathleen M. Foley (born 1944) is an American physician. She was an Attending Neurologist at Memorial Sloan-Kettering Cancer Center in New York City. She worked as a professor of Neurology, Neuroscience, and Clinical Pharmacology at Cornell University Weill Medical College. Foley made contributions toward making palliative care for cancer patients accessible. She headed the country's first pain service in a cancer center at Memorial Sloan-Kettering and was the medical director of the Supportive Care Program. In 1999, she became the director of the Open Society Institute's Project on Death in America. Additionally, Foley was the Director of the WHO Collaborating Center for Cancer Pain Research and Education at Memorial Sloan-Kettering Cancer Center. She holds the Chair of the Society of Memorial Sloan-Kettering Cancer Center in Pain Research and continues to work with the Open Society Institute as the Medical Director of the International Palliative Care Initiative of the Network Public Health Program of the Research.

== Background and education ==
Foley was born in 1944. She began her undergraduate career at St. John's University, where she received her Bachelor of Science. Foley then attended Cornell University Medical College. She graduated from Cornell University Medical College in 1969 as a member of the Alpha Omega Alpha medical honor society. Foley completed a medical internship and a residency in neurology at New York Hospital - Cornell Medical Center. Following her residency, she was offered a fellowship in neuro-oncology to study cancer pain at Memorial Sloan-Kettering Cancer Center by Jerome Posner, MD, who was the chair of the Neurology Department.

== Career ==
Foley's career started in 1974 when she began serving as an Attending Neurologist at Memorial Sloan-Kettering Cancer Center in New York City. In addition to working at Memorial Sloan-Kettering, she has held teaching and research positions at Cornell University Weill Medical College. At Weill Medical College, Foley was Professor of Neurology, Neuroscience, and Clinical Pharmacology. In 1981, Memorial Sloan-Kettering opened the country's first pain service in a cancer center, headed by Foley. Around the same time that this pain service was opened, Memorial Sloan-Kettering also started the Supportive Care Program. Foley was the medical director of this program. The Supportive Care Program was designed to provide care for cancer patients with significant pain problems outside of the hospital. Foley was the head of the pain service in the cancer center of Memorial Sloan-Kettering until 1999, when she stepped down in order to spend more time at the Open Society Institute's Project on Death in America. In 1995, Foley became the director of the Open Society Institute's Project on Death in America, also known as PDIA. As the director of the PDIA program, Foley worked alongside the government to develop palliative care policies and initiatives. Along with this work, Foley was the Director of the WHO Collaborating Center for Cancer Pain Research and Education at Memorial Sloan-Kettering Cancer Center. Foley is also a professor of Clinical Pharmacology at Cornell University Weill Medical College and Attending Neurologist at Memorial Sloan-Kettering. She also holds the Chair of the Society of Memorial Sloan-Kettering Cancer Center in Pain Research and still works with the Open Society Institute as the Medical Director of the International Palliative Care Initiative of the Network Public Health Program of the Research.

== Research and publications ==
Foley has published over 290 scientific papers and has edited seven books. Additionally, Foley works as a reviewer or on the editorial board of over two dozen medical journals. One of her most cited publications is her book Improving Palliative Care for Cancer. In addition to her book, she has also published many articles, including, The nature of opioid responsiveness and its implications for neuropathic pain: new hypotheses derived from studies of opioid infusions, Opioid Pharmacotherapy for Chronic Non-Cancer Pain in the United States: A Research Guideline for Developing an Evidence-Base, Treatment of opioid-induced constipation with oral naloxone: A pilot study, and Transdermal fentanyl for cancer pain. Repeated dose pharmacokinetics.

== Awards and honors ==
Foley was awarded the Medal of Honor from the American Cancer Society in 2013. She received this Medal of Honor for her strong efforts involving specialized medical care for cancer patients.[10] This medal "recognizes "extraordinary contributions to the fight against cancer", and is the highest honor granted by the American Cancer Society.

In 1998, Foley was awarded the David Karnofsky Award and Lecture from the American Society of Clinical Oncology. This award recognizes oncologists for their exceptional contribution to cancer research, diagnosis, and treatment. Foley was recognized for her clinical research which focused on the assessment of pain in cancer patients as well as the treatment of this pain.

In addition to these two awards, Foley received the Frank Netter Award of the American Academy of Neurology and both the Distinguished Service Award and the Humanitarian Award from the American Cancer Society in 1992 and 2004 respectively.

== Personal life ==
Foley currently lives in New York with her husband, Charles Foley. Together, they have two sons, Fritz and David Foley.
