= European Association for Clinical Pharmacology and Therapeutics =

- Founded: 1995
- Type: Medical research, education, ethics, health policy, regulation, training
- Purpose: Clinical Pharmacology and Therapeutics
- Region served: European Union and external international
- Key people: Tabassome Simon (Chairman)
- Website: www.eacpt.eu

The European Association for Clinical Pharmacology and Therapeutics (EACPT) is a learned society in the field of clinical pharmacology. It is the leading society in Europe serving the European and global Clinical Pharmacology and Therapeutics community. It has its origins in a working party in the early 1980s under the auspices of the World Health Organization (WHO-Europe). Subsequently, a committee was created in 1993 chaired by Folke Sjöqvist with the remit to prepare the first congress of EACPT, held in Paris in 1995. At that congress the founding EACPT Council elected an Executive Committee with Sjöqvist as chairman, Michael Orme (United Kingdom) as Honorary Secretary, Jochen Kuhlmann (Germany) as Treasurer, and Giampaolo Velo (Italy) as Vice-Chairman, with 26 European countries as members through their home country clinical pharmacology society or section. The EACPT now includes all national organisations for clinical pharmacology in Europe and provides educational and scientific support for the more than 4000 individual professionals interested in Clinical Pharmacology and Therapeutics throughout the European region, with its congresses attended by a global audience.

== Aims ==
The EACPT promotes in Europe professional and ethical excellence and standards for clinical use of medicines and clinical research on drugs. The EACPT also aims to advise policy makers on how the specialty can contribute to human health and wealth.

== Activities ==
Activities of the EACPT include advice to policy makers and agencies in Europe, holding European congresses and workshops, and publishing policy papers, meeting reports, proceedings of congresses and constituent symposia, and contents of specific lectures. The EACPT also holds Focus Meetings.

== Summer schools ==
- 2001 Antalya, Turkey
- 2003 Budapest, Hungary
- 2004 Sofia, Bulgaria
- 2006 Vrsac, Serbia
- 2007 Ghent, Belgium
- 2008 Madrid, Spain
- 2009 Alexandroupolis, Greece
- 2010 Dresden, Germany
- 2012 Amsterdam, Netherlands - Education
- 2013 Edinburgh, Scotland - Practice and Governance

== Focused meetings ==
- 2014 Nijmegen, Netherlands - Cardiovascular
- 2016 Opatija, Croatia - How to Assess Medicines

== EACPT congresses ==
Congresses are open to delegates from Europe and anywhere in the world, including health professionals, researchers, biotechnology and pharmaceutical industry professionals, regulators, policy makers, ethicists and others interested in drug discovery, and in clinical, cost-effectiveness and safety of medicines and related biomarkers.

- 1995 Paris
- 1997 Berlin
- 1999 Jerusalem
- 2000 Florence
- 2001 Odense
- 2003 Istanbul
- 2005 Poznan
- 2007 Amsterdam
- 2009 Edinburgh
- 2011 Budapest
- 2013 Geneva
- 2015 Madrid
- 2017 Prague
- 2019 Stockholm
- 2021 Athens

== Lifetime achievement awards ==
- 2009 Folke Sjöqvist, Sweden
- 2011 Sir Colin Dollery, United Kingdom
- 2013 Carlo Patrono, Italy and Sir Michael Rawlins, United Kingdom
- 2015 Michel Eichelbaum, Germany

== Scientific award for best publication ==
- 2009 Ian Wilkinson, Cambridge, United Kingdom
- 2011 Tabassome Simon, Paris, France
- 2013 David Devos, Lille, France
- 2015 Nicholas Bateman, Edinburgh, UK

== EACPT-EPHAR Young Investigator Awards in Translational Pharmacology ==
- 2015 Christoph Schneider, Bern, Switzerland and Daniel Antoine, Liverpool, UK

== Special award for services to EACPT ==
- 2013 Michael Orme, United Kingdom

== Organisation ==
The EACPT is led by an Executive Committee formed from a council of delegates from affiliated national societies for clinical pharmacology and therapeutics. The EACPT also has key Working Groups for Research, Ethics and Regulatory Matters, Education and Young Pharmacologists.

== Official EACPT journal ==
Clinical Therapeutics
