= Mary Pickford (physiologist) =

British neuroendocrinologist (1902-2002)

Lillian Mary Pickford FRS FRSE
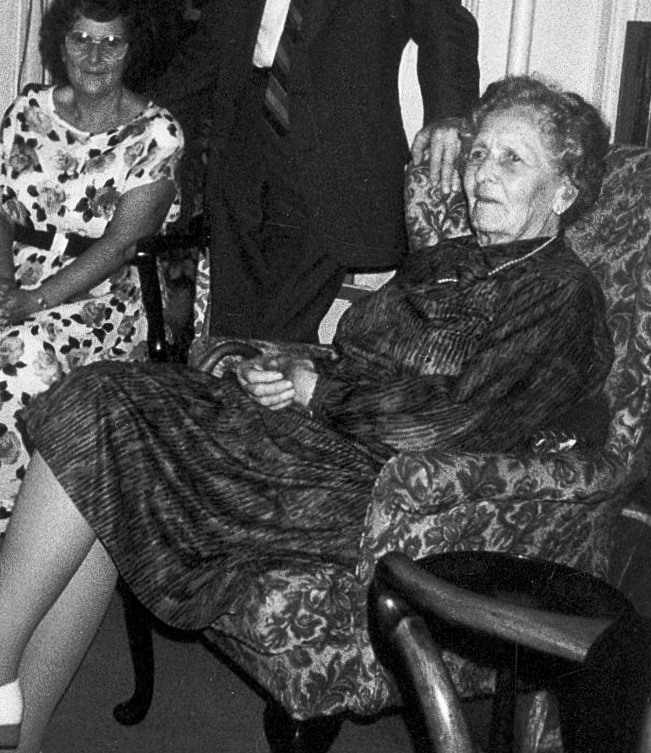
- Pickford in 1990
- Born: 14 August 1902; Jabalpur, India
- Died: 14 August 2002 (aged 100)
- Known for: Neuroendocrinology

Lillian Mary Pickford FRS FRSE (14 August 1902 – 14 August 2002) was a pioneering British neuroendocrinologist. She was the first woman to be elected to the Pharmacological Society and the first woman appointed to a medical professorship at the University of Edinburgh.

== Life and work ==
Pickford was born in Jubbulpore, India on 14 August 1902 the daughter of Herbert Arthur Pickford, a tea and indigo planter, and his wife, Lillian Alice Minnie Wintle.

She was sent to live with her aunt and uncle in Surrey, England at the age of five. A family friend, Sir Cooper Perry encouraged her to become a doctor but discouraged her from becoming a researcher, saying, 'Don't think of it. Women are no use at that kind of thing'. She was educated at Wycombe Abbey school. In 1925 she graduated from Bedford College, London, having read physiology, zoology, and chemistry. After graduation the scarcity of work for women scientists meant she had difficulty finding any, but she found part-time work teaching before being accepted as a research assistant at University College London. A legacy from her godmother of £120 a year meant she could study clinical medicine part-time at University College Hospital and she was admitted MRCS and LRCP in 1933. In 1935 she became House Physician at Stafford General Hospital.

In 1936 Pickford was awarded a Beit Memorial Fellowship and in 1939 reported on the antidiuretic effect of injecting acetylcholine into the brain.

In 1939 she became lecturer in the department of physiology at the University of Edinburgh, where she remained until she retired in 1972. She graduated DSc in 1951, was promoted to Reader in 1952 and in 1966 became Professor of Physiology

=== Awards and honours ===
In 1954 she was elected a Fellow of the Royal Society of Edinburgh (FRSE). Her proposers were David Whitteridge, John Gaddum, Reginald Passmore and Philip Eggleton. In 1966 she became Professor of Physiology at the University of Edinburgh. She was elected a Fellow of the Royal Society in 1966.

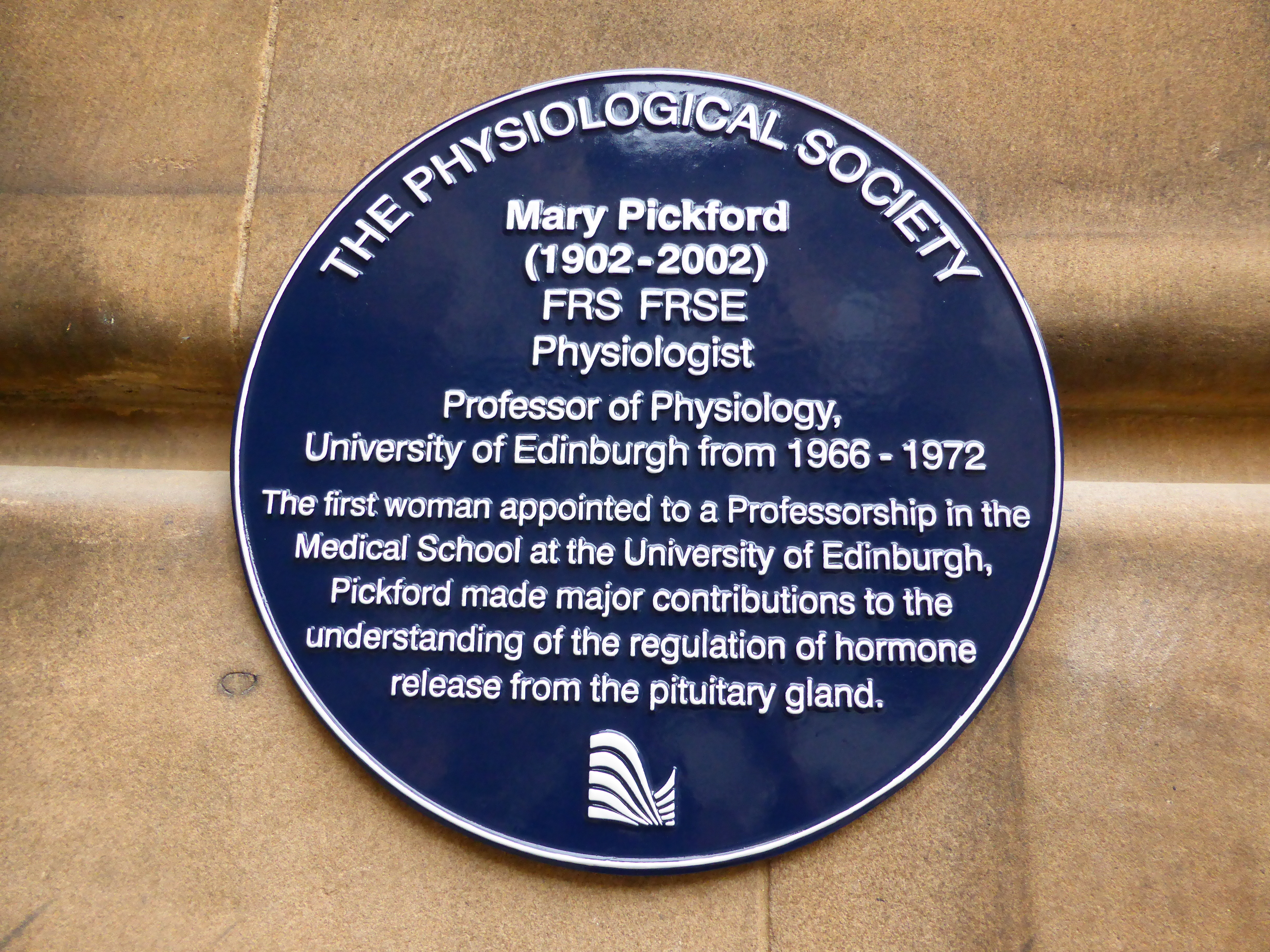
Plaque to Mary Pickford, Physiologist, at University of Edinburgh

In addition to over 60 full papers and 13 book chapters, Pickford published a popular book The Central Role of Hormones (1969).

Pickford received an honorary doctorate (DSc) from Heriot-Watt University in 1991.

Professor Pickford died on her hundredth birthday in 2002. In 2021, a memorial blue plaque was erected by The Physiological Society, in the University of Edinburgh Old Medicine Quad in her honour, the first to a woman, recognising she was a scientist who had 'contributed to the advancement of the discipline through their discoveries, leaving a legacy beyond their lifetime.'

== Publications ==
- The Central Role of Hormones (1969)
