= Barbara Harvey =

English historian (1928–2025)

Barbara Harvey CBE FBA FRHistS FSA
- Born: 21 January 1928; Teignmouth, England
- Died: 9 August 2025 (aged 97)

Academic background
- Education: Somerville College, Oxford (BA, BLitt)

Academic work
- Discipline: Historian
- Sub-discipline: Medieval history; England in the Middle Ages; monasticism; Westminster Abbey
- Institutions: University of Edinburgh; Queen Mary University of London; Somerville College, Oxford
- Doctoral students: John Blair
- Notable students: Roy Strong; Alice Prochaska; Caroline Barron; Teresa Webber

Barbara Fitzgerald Harvey, CBE, FBA, FRHistS, FSA (21 January 1928 – 9 August 2025) was an English medieval historian and academic specialising in English monasticism with specific reference to Westminster Abbey. She was a fellow and tutor in history at Somerville College, Oxford from 1955 until 1993.

== Early life and education ==
Harvey was born on 21 January 1928. She grew up in Devon and was educated at Teignmouth Grammar School in Teignmouth and Bishop Blackall School in Exeter. She matriculated at Somerville College, Oxford in 1946, having won an open scholarship. There she was much influenced by her history tutor, May McKisack: teacher and pupil "shared an ability to bridge the rarely crossed gulf between 'medieval' and 'early modern'".

After earning her BA, Harvey remained at Somerville to complete a BLitt thesis entitled "The Manor of Islip from the Conquest to the Dissolution" in 1951.

== Career ==
After earning her BLitt, Harvey spent a year in the Department of Scottish History at the University of Edinburgh and three years at Queen Mary College, London, where a young Roy Strong was among her students. In 1955 she was elected to a tutorial fellowship at Somerville College to replace the departing May McKisack. She retired in 1993, having held the college offices of Dean, Librarian and Vice-Principal during her tenure, as well as the role of university Assessor for the 1968–9 academic year. She also gave the Ford Lectures in British history in Hilary term 1989, taking as her subject "Living and dying in England 1140–1540, the monastic experience". Harvey was elected a Fellow of the British Academy (FBA) in 1982. She was appointed a Commander of the Most Excellent Order of the British Empire (CBE) in the 1997 Birthday Honours for services to medieval history. She was also elected a Fellow of the Royal Historical Society (FRHistS) and a Fellow of the Society of Antiquaries of London.

Among Harvey's pupils at Somerville College was Alice Prochaska, who went on to serve as the college's Principal from 2010 to 2017. Others included medieval historians Caroline Barron and Teresa Webber. Another notable doctoral student was John Blair, tutorial fellow of the Queen's College, Oxford, and co-editor of a festschrift in her honour with Brian Golding, another doctoral student.

Harvey was the joint winner of the Wolfson History Prize in 1993 for her book Living and Dying in England 1100–1540: The Monastic Experience, which examines the lives of monks at Westminster Abbey, one of England's greatest mediaeval monasteries. It was based on her Ford Lectures from four years earlier. From 1993 onwards, she was emeritus fellow of Somerville College, Oxford. Prior to her death, Harvey was an honorary vice-president of the Henry Bradshaw Society.

Harvey died on 9 August 2025, at the age of 97.

== Bibliography ==
- Custumal (1391) and Bye-laws (1386–1540) of the Manor of Islip (editor and translator; Oxfordshire Record Society, 1959)
- "Draft Letters Patent of Manumission and Pardon for the Men of Somerset in 1381", The English Historical Review (1965)
- Documents Illustrating the Rule of Walter de Wenlok, Abbot of Westminster, 1283–1307 (editor; Camden Society, 4th series, no. 2, 1965), ISBN 978-0901050632
- "The Population Trend in England between 1300 and 1348", Transactions of the Royal Historical Society (1966)
- "The Leasing of the Abbot of Westminster's Demesnes in the Later Middle Ages", The Economic History Review (1969)
- Westminster Abbey and its Estates in the Middle Ages (Oxford: Oxford University Press, 1977), ISBN 978-0198224495
- The Westminster Chronicle, 1381–1394 (co-editor and translator with L. C. Hector; Oxford: Oxford University Press, 1982), ISBN 978-0198222552
- Monastic Dress in the Middle Ages: Precept and Practice (Canterbury: William Urry Memorial Trust, 1988), ISBN 978-0951347607
- Living and Dying in England, 1100–1540: The Monastic Experience (Oxford: Oxford University Press, 1993), ISBN 978-0198204312
- The Twelfth and Thirteenth Centuries, 1066–c.1280 (editor; Short Oxford History of the British Isles; Oxford: Oxford University Press, 2001), ISBN 978-0198731399
- The Obedientiaries of Westminster Abbey and their Financial Records, c. 1275 to 1540 (Woodbridge: Boydell & Brewer, 2002), ISBN 978-0851158662
- The States of the Manors of Westminster Abbey c.1300 to 1422 (co-editor with C. M. Woolgar; Oxford: Oxford University Press for the British Academy, 2019), ISBN 978-0197266625
