= Y. Tony Yang =

American health policy scholar

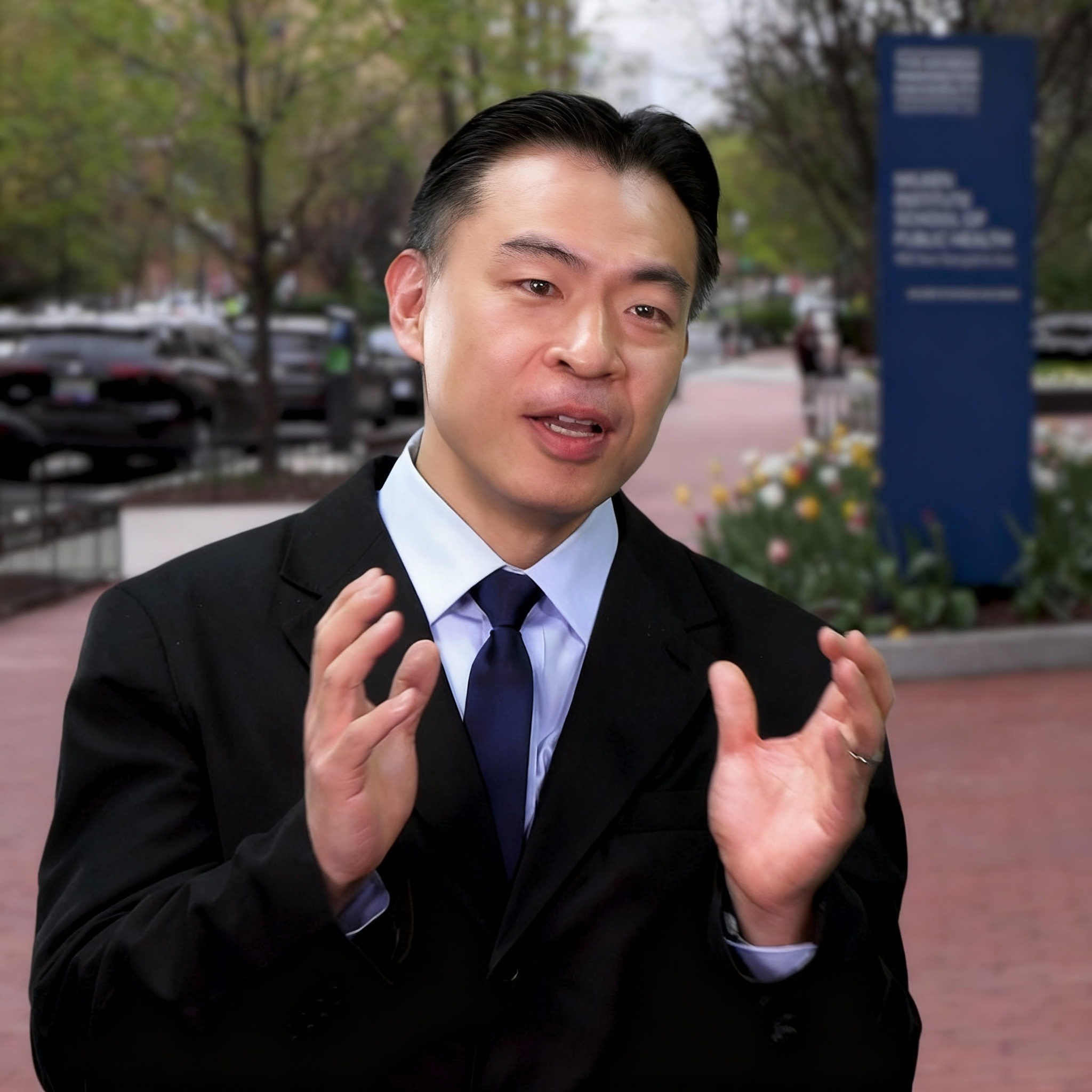
- Yang in 2025
- Born: Taipei, Taiwan
- Education: National Taiwan University (LLB); University of Pennsylvania (LLM); Harvard University (MPH, DSc)
- Occupations: Health policy scholar; professor
- Scientific career
- Fields: Health policy
- Institutions: George Washington University
- Thesis: Malpractice pressure, defensive medicine, and obstetric care (2006)

Y. Tony Yang is an American health policy scholar and academic. He serves as the Endowed Professor of Health Policy and Associate Dean for Health Policy and Population Science at George Washington University, with joint appointments in the School of Nursing and the Department of Health Policy and Management at the Milken Institute School of Public Health. He is also the Program Lead for Cancer Control and Health Equity at the George Washington University Cancer Center.

== Early life and education ==
Yang was born in Taipei, Taiwan. He attended National Taiwan University, where he graduated with an LL.B., and earned an LL.M. from the University of Pennsylvania Law School. He then completed graduate studies in public health and health policy at Harvard University, where he earned a Master of Public Health (M.P.H.) and a Doctor of Science (D.Sc.) in 2006, both from the Harvard T.H. Chan School of Public Health. His doctoral dissertation was titled, "Malpractice pressure, defensive medicine, and obstetric care".

Postdoctoral fellowship at the Massachusetts Institute of Technology (MIT). He subsequently served as an FDA Regulatory Science Fellow through the National Academy of Medicine (United States) and as a CDC Health Policy Fellow through AcademyHealth.

== Career ==
At George Washington University (GW), Yang previously served as Executive Director of the Center for Health Policy and Media Engagement and as a member of the Innovation Committee for Strategic Framework.

His research and commentary have been cited in major media outlets, including CNN, Fox News, NPR, The New York Times, The Wall Street Journal, The Washington Post, Los Angeles Times, and USA Today.

Yang is a member of the World Health Organization (WHO) Technical Advisory Group on clinical and policy considerations for new tuberculosis vaccines. He serves as Co-Editor-in-Chief of the journal Health Policy and Technology (published by Elsevier).

He is also a member of the AcademyHealth Education Council, serves as Treasurer and Board member of the American Society of Law, Medicine & Ethics, and as a Trustee of the Fellowship of Postgraduate Medicine.

== Research ==
Yang's research examines how legal and policy frameworks influence health outcomes and health disparities. He has authored more than 200 peer-reviewed publications, including first-author papers in journals such as The Lancet, The New England Journal of Medicine, JAMA, The BMJ, Health Affairs, American Journal of Bioethics, and the American Journal of Public Health. He has served as principal investigator on federal research projects with combined funding exceeding US$7 million, including a 4-year (2023-2027) research grant (R01) from the NIH National Cancer Institute.

He has also led studies supported by major U.S. foundations, including the Robert Wood Johnson Foundation’s Policy for Action, Interdisciplinary Research Leaders, and Public Health Law Research programs.

=== Honors and recognition ===
Yang has received multiple professional honors, including the 2025 Helen Rodríguez-Trías Social Justice Award from the American Public Health Association for his leadership in advancing health equity and vaccine access.

Excellence in Climate Leadership Award (2025) – Awarded by the American Public Health Association in recognition of leadership advancing climate change as a public health priority, with an emphasis on innovation and equity.

He is also a recipient of the Trachtenberg Prize for Scholarship and Research at the George Washington University.

Yang is a Distinguished Fellow of the National Academies of Practice.

In 2023, he was identified as a future research leader in climate and health by the UK Academy of Medical Sciences and the U.S. National Academy of Medicine, leading to his 2025 Excellence in Climate Leadership Award.

== Publications ==
=== Books ===
- Yang, Y. T. (2023). Vaccine Law and Policy. Springer. ISBN 978-3-031-36988-9. This book examines the legal and policy dimensions of vaccines in the United States—covering regulatory oversight, mandates, exemptions, intellectual property, and vaccine injury compensation programs.
- Yang, Y. T. (2024). Achieving Health Equity: The Role of Law and Policy. Wiley-Blackwell. ISBN 978-1394263752. The work discusses how laws and policies interact with social, economic, and environmental factors to influence health equity across populations.
- Yang, Y. T. (2026). Sun Tzu: The Art of War for Health & Longevity: The Warrior's Way to Wellness. Tuttle Publishing. ISBN 978-0-8048-5858-8. Applies Sun Tzu's five pillars to personal wellness, turning strategies into actionable "battle plans" for nutrition, exercise, recovery, work–life balance, and prevention. Includes chapter charts, assessments, and case-study regimens to operationalize goals such as better sleep and stress resilience."Sun Tzu: The Art of War for Health & Longevity". Tuttle Publishing.

=== Selected first-author publications ===
- Yang, Y. T., Mello, M. M., Subramanian, S. V., & Studdert, D. M. (2009). Relationship between malpractice litigation pressure and rates of cesarean section and vaginal birth after cesarean section. Medical Care 47(2):234–242. https://doi.org/10.1097/MLR.0b013e31818475de
- Yang, Y. T., & Silverman, R. D. (2014). Mobile health applications: the patchwork of legal and liability issues suggests strategies to improve oversight. Health Affairs (Project Hope), 33(2), 222–227. https://doi.org/10.1377/hlthaff.2013.0958
- Yang, Y. T., & Silverman, R. D. (2015). Legislative prescriptions for controlling nonmedical vaccine exemptions. JAMA, 313(3), 247–248. https://doi.org/10.1001/jama.2014.16286
- Yang, Y. T., Delamater, P. L., Leslie, T. F., & Mello, M. M. (2016). Sociodemographic Predictors of Vaccination Exemptions on the Basis of Personal Belief in California. American journal of public health, 106(1), 172–177. https://doi.org/10.2105/AJPH.2015.302926
- Yang, Y. T., Nagai, S., Chen, B. K., Qureshi, Z. P., Lebby, A. A., Kessler, S., Georgantopoulos, P., Raisch, D. W., Sartor, O., Hermanson, T., Kane, R. C., Hrushesky, W. J., Riente, J. J., Norris, L. B., Bobolts, L. R., Armitage, J. O., & Bennett, C. L. (2016). Generic oncology drugs: are they all safe?. The Lancet. Oncology, 17(11), e493–e501. https://doi.org/10.1016/S1470-2045(16)30384-9
