= Jennifer Martin =

Jennifer Martin may refer to:

- Jennifer H. Martin, Australian pharmacologist
- Jennifer L. Martin, Australian molecular biologist
- Jennifer Martin (soccer)
