= Jeffrey Aronson =

British clinical pharmacologist (born 1947)

- Born: Jeffrey Kenneth Aronson; 1947 (age 78–79)

Jeffrey Kenneth Aronson FRCP, HonFBPhS, HonFFPM (born 1947) is a British physician, clinical pharmacologist, and medical journalist, currently working at the Centre for Evidence-Based Medicine in Oxford.

== Education ==
Aronson studied at the University of Glasgow from 1964 to 1970, qualifying with the degree of MBChB, and after primary medical training in Glasgow hospitals (MRCP 1973) joined the Medical Research Council's Unit and University Department of Clinical Pharmacology in Oxford, qualifying DPhil Oxon in 1977.

== Career ==
After further clinical and scientific training, in 1980 he became Wellcome Lecturer and Consultant in Clinical Pharmacology and later Reader in Clinical Pharmacology at the University of Oxford and an honorary consultant physician in the Oxford Radcliffe Hospitals Trust until 2014. He now works as an Honorary Consultant Physician and Clinical Pharmacologist in the Centre for Evidence Based Medicine in the Nuffield Department of Primary Care Health Sciences in Oxford.

He served as president of the British Pharmacological Society in 2008–2009; as vice-chairman of the Medicines Commission from 2002 to 2005; and as editor-in-chief of the British Journal of Clinical Pharmacology from 2002 to 2007. He also served as chair of the British Pharmacopoeia Commission's Expert Advisory Group on Nomenclature from 2006 to 2021 and currently chairs its successor committee, the Joint Expert Advisory Groups on Pharmacy and Nomenclature. He is a member of the World Health Organization’s Expert Advisory Panel on International Pharmacopoeia and Pharmaceutical Preparations. He was a member of the Formulary Committees of the British National Formulary from 2006 to 2012, and of the British National Formulary for Children from 2003 to 2012

He was elected a Fellow of the Royal College of Physicians in 1985, an Honorary Fellow of the Faculty of Pharmaceutical Medicine in 2007, and an Honorary Fellow of the British Pharmacological Society in 2014. He was made an Honorary Member of the International Society of Pharmacovigilance (ISoP) in 2024.

He has been listed as one of the Makers of Modern Biomedicine and in 2016 was the subject of a recorded interview by Professor E M Tansey, on behalf of the Wellcome Trust’s History of Modern Biomedicine Research Group.

He served as Oxford University Assessor during 1989 and 1990.

== Publications ==
He has published over 200 original scientific papers and over 300 reviews and editorial reviews in peer-reviewed bioscience journals. He publishes a weekly opinion column in the BMJ under the general heading "When I Use a Word". Starting in 1997, he edited volumes 20-35 of the Side Effects of Drugs Annual. He edited the 15th and 16th editions (Elsevier, 2006 and 2016) of Meyler’s Side Effects of Drugs—The International Encyclopedia of Adverse Drug Reactions and Interactions. Together with John Talbot, he edited the 6th edition of Stephens’ Detection and Evaluation of Adverse Drug Reactions: Principles and Practice (Wiley-Blackwell, 2011), and, with Paul Glasziou and Les Irwig, Evidence-based Medical Monitoring: From Principles to Practice (Blackwell Publishing/BMJ Books, 2008).
