= Susan Brain =

Professor of Pharmacology at King's College London

Susan Brain FBPhS
- Born: Susan Diana Brain
- Education: University of London (PhD)
- Scientific career
- Fields: Physiology; Pharmacology
- Workplaces: King's College London
- Thesis: Relationship between lipolysis and prostaglandin biosynthesis in adipose tissue (1981)
- Website: www.kcl.ac.uk/people/professor-susan-brain

Susan Diana Brain FBPhS is a professor of pharmacology at the School of Cardiovascular Medicine and Sciences at King's College London where she has worked since 1989.

== Education ==
Brain completed a PhD in pharmacology at University College London in 1981.

== Career and research ==
Brain held a postdoctoral post at the Institute of Dermatology. In 1989 she took up a lectureship at King's College London, where she was promoted to Reader in 1993 and in 1998 she was made Professor of Pharmacology at the School of Cardiovascular Medicine, where since 2005 she has been Head of the Vascular Biology and Inflammation Section. She was also Head of the Pharmacology and Therapeutics Education Department between 2011 and 2018.

Brain's research investigates the role of sensory nerves in vascular inflammation. In her early career she discovered the Calcitonin gene-related peptide receptor antagonist (CGRP) as a potent microvascular vasodilator. More recently her research found that the gene TRPC5 can help protect against pain in arthritis and that the gene TRPA1 is essential for the vascular response when being exposed to cold environments.

=== Awards and honours ===
In 2018 she was elected as honorary fellow of the British Pharmacological Society.
