= Hippocrates Prize for Poetry and Medicine =

Award

- Founded: 2009
- Founders: Donald Singer and Michael Hulse
- Type: Health, humanities, history, education
- Purpose: Poetry and medicine
- Website: www.hippocrates-poetry.org

The Hippocrates Prize for Poetry and Medicine was founded in 2009 by Donald Singer and Michael Hulse. The founders "wished to draw together national and international perspectives on three major historical and contemporary themes uniting the disciplines of poetry and medicine: medicine as inspiration for the writings of poets; effects of poetic creativity on the experience of illness by patients, their families, friends, and carers; and poetry as therapy".

== Background ==
The Hippocrates Prize for Poetry and Medicine provides international awards for unpublished poems in English by any living poet. There are seven main awards in the Hippocrates Prize for Poetry and Medicine. Three awards are given for international health students or international Health Service-related professionals, including clinicians, educators, researchers, and biomedical scientists. Three awards are given for open international entries. The International Hippocrates Prize for Young Poets was launched in 2012, and is also given for an unpublished poem on a medical theme.
The Hippocrates Prize is awarded at an annual international conference on poetry and medicine.

The 2010 and 2011 International Conferences on Poetry and Medicine and Hippocrates Awards generated the International Hippocrates Research Forum for Poetry and Medicine.

The Hippocrates poetry and medicine initiative was awarded the 2011 Times Higher Education award for Excellence and Innovation.

== Hippocrates Prize conferences ==
- The 2017 Hippocrates Prize for Poetry and Medicine was awarded at Harvard Medical School in partnership with its Arts and Humanities Initiative.
- The 2018 Hippocrates Prize for Poetry and Medicine was awarded in Chicago in partnership with the Center for Bioethics and Medical Humanities at Northwestern University's Feinberg School of Medicine, the Poetry Foundation, the Arts and Humanities Initiative at Harvard Medical School and the Fellowship of Postgraduate Medicine.
- The 2019 Hippocrates Prize for Poetry and Medicine was awarded at the Life Science Centre of the Centre for Life in Newcastle in partnership with the Newcastle Centre for the Literary Arts and the Newcastle Institute for Creative Arts Practice.

== See also ==
- Fellowship of Postgraduate Medicine
- Hippocrates
