= Spyros Marketos =

Greek politician and professor (1931–2012)

Spyros Marketos (Greek: Σπύρος Μαρκέτος; April 15, 1931 – February 29, 2012) was a Greek physician, professor of medicine, writer and politician.

== Life ==
Born in Athens in 1931, he followed family tradition by entering the medical profession. He studied at the Medical School of the National and Kapodistrian University of Athens and received his degree in 1955. In 1967, he became a member of the National Research Council and a co-investigator of the American Heart Association and the World Health Organization. He climbed the ladder of the academic hierarchy in two different scientific fields: Clinical Therapeutics and History of Medicine. He was elected successively as Assistant Professor (1969–72) and as Associate Professor (1973–78) in the Department of Clinical Therapeutics of the Medical School of Athens.

During the period 1976-1980 and at the personal invitation of Constantine Karamanlis he served as Secretary General for the Greek Ministry of Social Services. Prof. Marketos embraced Karamanlis’ European vision for Greece and assisted his government in pursuing a determined policy toward Greek membership of the then EEC. Among his political achievements, Prof. Marketos pioneered the founding of two Medical Schools in Greece (in the city of Ioannina and in the city of Alexandroupolis). He was instrumental in the passing by the Greek Parliament of pertinent legislation concerning the rights of patients with renal diseases. Prof. Marketos served also as President of the National Welfare Organization and of the National Committee on Human Tissue Transplantation for Therapeutic Purposes. During the years 1986-1989 he also served as a Member of the Greek Parliament.

Throughout his life, he was also interested in introducing medicine to the general public, as evidenced by more than 600 articles in the Greek press, mostly in Kathimerini, where he maintained a permanent column in the Sunday edition for 16 years under the pseudonym “Galen”. He was Editor-in-Chief of Materia Medica Greca (1973–1992), and President of the Greek Association of Medical Press.

== Marketos as a scholar ==
Spyros Marketos served as professor and chairman (1980–1998) of the Department of History and Philosophy of Medicine at the Medical School of the National and Kapodistrian University of Athens, and in 1998 he retired as an emeritus professor. His scientific research covered a diverse set of topics ranging from quantitative nosography and social medicine to history of medicine and medical ethics. He has published eighteen books. He was the author or co-author of more than 300 scientific papers on topics such as history of medicine, public health, medical ethics and nephrology.

Between 1993 and 2000 he served as president of the International Hippocratic Foundation of Kos. During his term the foundation inaugurated, under the auspices of President Karamanlis, the Hippocratic Museum of medicine and hosted a number of international activities including the First Medical Olympics (a quadrennial medical symposium of notable international practitioners and academics) that took place on the island of Cos in 1996.

== Publications: Writings on public health ==
- Bio-medical Notes, Athens: Kathimerini, 1977 (in Greek)
- Living Well, Athens: Dodoni, 1978 (in Greek)
- Doing Well, Athens: Kedros, 1979 (in Greek)

== Publications: Writings on history of medicine ==
- Claude Bernard and our Era, Athens: Kedros 1979 (in Greek)
- René Laennec: The French Hippocrates, Athens: Kedros 1982 (In Greek)
- Hellenic Medicine: Medico-Historical Issues, Athens: Parisianos 1991
- George N. Papanicolaou, Athens: Zita Publications, 2000 (In Greek)
- George Kotzias, Athens: Zita Publications, 2000 (In Greek)
- George Ioakimoglou, Athens: Zita Publications, 2000 (In Greek)
- Dionysios Ikkos, Athens: Zita Publications, 2000 (In Greek)
- Nikolaos Louros, Athens: Zita Publications, 2001 (In Greek)
- Petros Kokkalis, Athens: Zita Publications, 2002 (In Greek)
- History of Medicine, Athens: Zita Publications, 2008 (In Greek)
- Spyros Dontas, Athens: Zita Publications, 2011 (In Greek)
- Marinos Geroulanos, Athens: Zita Publications, 2011 (In Greek)
- George Merikas, Athens: Zita Publications, 2011 (In Greek)
- Spyros Doxiadis, Athens: Zita Publications, 2011 (In Greek)
- Nikolaos Alivizatos, Athens: Zita Publications, 2011 (In Greek)

=== Essays ===
- Merikas G, Marketos S (1963): The pyrogen test in chronic pyelonephritis. The LANCET, Volume 1, Issue 7288.
- Marketos SG and Ballas C. (1982) Bronchial asthma in the medical literature of Greek antiquity. J. Asthma 1982; 19: 263–269.
- Marketos S.G. Papaeconomou C. (1992): Medicine, Magic and Religion in Ancient Greece. Humane Medicine, 8, 41–44.
- Marketos S.G. (1992): Le serment d` Hippocrate est-il anachronique? Le Generaliste, 24, 30–31.
- Marketos S.G. (1994): Medicine is an Aspect of Civilization: Lessons from the Hippocratic Medicine. Microsurgery, 14, 2.5.
- Marketos S.G. (1993): Hippocrates the Koan: The Father of Rational Medicine. In Hippocrates Symposium edited by A. Springer Japan Publishing Inc., p. 7-14
- Marketos S.G. (1994): Hippocratic Medicine and Philosophy at the turn of the 20th Century. MOA Health Science Foundation, Tokyo, Japan.
- Marketos S.G. Poulakou-Rebelakou E. (1994): Traditional Medicine in Ancient Greece. Proceedings of the 4th International Congress on Traditional Medicine Vol. II, 387–398.
- Marketos S.G. (1994): Hippocratic Medicine and Nephrology. American Journal of Nephrology. 14, 264–269.
- Marketos S.G., Diamantopoulos A., Moschos C. (1995): Is the Hippocratic Oath an Anachronism? World Health Forum, 16, 77–78.
- Marketos S.G., Poulakou-Rebelakou E. (1995): Traditional Medicine in Ancient Greece: The co-existence of Asclepiad Art and Hippocratic Medicine. Przeglad Lekarski, 52, 612–614.
- Marketos S.G. (1995): Nature and Medicine: Nature as the Physician of Disease. MOA Health Science Foundation, Tokyo, Japan.
- Marketos SG (1995): Is the Hippocratic oath an anachronism? World Health Forum 1995; 16: 77–78.
- Marketos S.G. et al. (1996): The Hippocratic Oath. The LANCET, I, 101–102.
- Marketos S.G. (1996): Hippocratic Medicine at the turn of the 20th century. Some prophetic messages. Riv. Storia Med., 6, (N.S.) 455–464.
- Marketos S.G. et al.: Swearing off the Oath? (1997): Journal of the Royal Society of Medicine, 90. 527.
- Marketos S.G. (1997): The medical school of Kos: Hippocratic medicine. Forum, 7, 313–324.
- Marketos S.G., et al. (1999): The modern Hippocratic tradition. Some messages for contemporary medicine. Spine, 24, 1159–1163
- Marketos SG, Koutras DA (1999). Experimental nephritis: one of the earliest publications on the subject by a pioneer of Neohippocratism. American Journal of Nephrology. 1999;19(2):333-5.
- Marketos S.G. (2000): Medicine and Humanities. Arch, Helle, Med. 17, 440–449.

==== References ====
- Educational Greek Encyclopedia, Athens: Ekdotiki Publishing 1995, vol. 6 sel.49.
- George Kalatzis, Costas Tsiamis, Efi Poulakou- Rebelakou “Teaching History of Medicine in Athens University Medical School (1837-1998)”
- The History of the International Hippocratic Foundation of Cos
- The Lancet
- The History of Medicine
- Zita Medical Publications
- Hippocratic Ethics in Modern Medicine
- Greek Parliament: List of MPs since 1974
