= Jennifer Martin (pharmacologist) =

Australian clinical pharmacologist, physician and academic

Jennifer Martin FAHMS FRACP

Personal details
- Born: Jennifer Helen Martin Wellington, New Zealand
- Occupation: Pharmacologist

Jennifer Helen Martin is an Australian clinical pharmacologist, physician and academic. She is chair of Clinical Pharmacology in the University of Newcastle School of Medicine and Public Health, Director of the NHMRC funded Australian Centre for Cannabinoid Clinical and Research Excellence (ACRE), and a Fellow of the Australian Academy of Health and Medical Sciences. Martin is also Editor-in-Chief of the academic journal Pharmacology Research & Perspectives. Martin translates research into practice and policy. Her research involves the investigation of therapeutic drugs, from drug design and development, to clinical trials and studies to investigate how new drugs perform in the general population.

Governance roles include President-Elect of the RACP and President from May 2024; Council Member of the University of Newcastle and the NSW Council AICD

== Early life ==
Martin grew up in Wellington, New Zealand where she followed an early interest in medicine from her love of sport, hoping to one day be the doctor who travelled with the New Zealand Olympic team.

After studying medicine at the University of Otago, moved to work and study in the United Kingdom in 1993, later returning to New Zealand to train as a specialist in pharmacology and internal medicine. Martin moved to Melbourne to undertake a PhD in medicine in 2000.

== Career ==
Martin is a Rhodes Scholar who studied PPE and health economics at the University of Oxford. She completed a Bachelor of Medicine and Surgery from the University of Otago and a Doctor of Philosophy at Monash University in 2005, examining innate immunity and heart failure pathophysiology in people with type 2 diabetes. Her post-doctoral work investigated macrophage function in high fat diet at the Walter and Eliza Hall Institute.

Following her post-doctoral studies, Martin became the Head of Southside Clinical School at the University of Queensland where she was involved in revising the medical curricula to broaden medical student experiences in healthcare. Martin took on the leadership position of Chair of Clinical Pharmacology at the University of Newcastle in 2013.

Martin was elected a Fellow of the Australian Academy of Health and Medical Sciences in 2020. In the same year she published a report of clinical trials in Australia of using increasingly legal medicines based on cannabis. The report gave advice on ethics and keeping patients safe.

Martin resigned as staff-elected Councillor from the University of Newcastle Council in June 2021 in protest at the appointment of Whitehaven Coal Chairman Mark Vaile as Chancellor. Vaile did not take up the Chancellor role and Martin was re-elected to the University Council in October 2021

On 22 April 2026, members of the Royal Australasian College of Physicians (RACP) voted to remove Martin as president (2,179 in favor; 1,890 against). The college board subsequently launched an investigation into the validity of the vote, citing procedural irregularities and security disturbances that required police attendance, and stated she remains chair pending legal advice.
