= Assessor (Oxford) =

The Assessor is an official in the University of Oxford, in England. The position was created in 1960. The assessor is responsible for student welfare and serves for one year, beginning in March.

== Notable assessors ==
Notable former assessors include:

- Barbara Harvey (1968–69)
- Jeffrey K Aronson (1989–90)
- Michael Mingos (1991–92)
- John Landers (1994–95)
- Roger Goodman (1997–98)
- Angus M. Bowie (1998–99)
- Lawrence Goldman (2000–01)
- Patricia Daley (2015–16)
- William Allan (2018–19)
