= Health Policy and Technology =

- Discipline: Health policy
- Language: English
- Edited by: Carlo Lazzaro alongside Y. Tony Yang, (April 2025- Ken Redekop, (2017-March 2025), Wendy L. Currie, Founding Editor (2012-2017)

Publication details
- History: 2012-present
- Publisher: Elsevier on behalf of the Fellowship of Postgraduate Medicine
- Frequency: Quarterly
- Open access: Hybrid
- Impact factor: 5.211 (2021)

Standard abbreviations
- ISO 4: Health Policy Technol.

Indexing
- ISSN: 2211-8837
- OCLC no.: 786051404

Links
- Journal homepage; Online access; Online archive

Health Policy and Technology is a quarterly peer-reviewed healthcare journal that was established in 2012 and published by Elsevier on behalf of the Fellowship of Postgraduate Medicine. Professor Wendy L. Currie was the founding editor-in-chief, from 2012 to 2017. It is one of two official journals, the other being the Postgraduate Medical Journal. It covers health policy and development, assessment of clinical and cost-effectiveness, and implementation of all types of medical technology, including drugs, devices, diagnostics, and eHealth platforms. The journal is abstracted and indexed in Scopus, Social Sciences Citation Index, and Embase. According to the Journal Citation Reports, the journal has a 2021 impact factor of 5.211.

== Conferences ==
The journal has organised conferences in partnership with the Fellowship of Postgraduate Medicine. In 2017, the journal, the Fellowship, and the Cardiovascular Research Trust held a conference in London on health policy to prevent heart disease. In June 2019, the journal and the Fellowship organised a conference on European Cooperation in Healthcare at the Erasmus University Rotterdam. For 2021, to mark the 10th Anniversary of the journal, Health Policy and Technology is organising in partnership with the Fellowship of Postgraduate Medicine an online Conference Series with panel discussions and peer-reviewed abstracts on Vaccines, Trusted Information and Fake News; Artificial Intelligence – Improving Health, from Smart Hospitals to Smart Homes; Equity and Outcomes, Ensuring Fair Access to Healthcare; Addressing Geopolitical Challenges to the Price of Medicines; and Climate and Health – why should policy-makers and the public be concerned?

== International Awards for Medical Writing in Social Media ==
In 2020, the journal launched annual international awards for trusted medical writing in social media.
