= Hilary Little =

British pharmacologist

- Occupation: Professor of Addiction Science
- Employer(s): St George's, University of London & Institute of Psychiatry
- Known for: Research into on alcohol dependence

Hilary Little is British pharmacologist. She is a Professor of Addiction Science at St George's, University of London and the Institute of Psychiatry. Little's research has a focus on alcohol dependence including pharmacological treatments, influence of stress in alcohol dependence and the effects of chronic alcohol consumption on memory. Little is a member of the British Pharmacological Society, the British Association for Psychopharmacology and the Research Society on Alcoholism and a reviewing editor of the Addition Biology journal.

== Selected publications ==
- Diana, Marco; Brodie, Mark; Muntoni, Annalisa; Puddu, Maria C.; Pillolla, Giuliano; Steffensen, Scott; Spiga, Saturnino; Little, Hilary J. (2003). "Enduring Effects of Chronic Ethanol in the CNS: Basis for Alcoholism". Alcoholism: Clinical and Experimental Research. 27 (2): 354–361. doi:10.1097/01.ALC.0000057121.36127.19. PMID 12605085.
- Little, Hilary J. (2000). "Behavioral mechanisms underlying the link between smoking and drinking". Alcohol Research & Health. 24 (4): 215–224.
- Little, Hilary J. (1999). "The contribution of electrophysiology to knowledge of the acute and chronic effects of ethanol". Pharmacology & Therapeutics. 84 (3): 333–353. doi:10.1016/S0163-7258(99)00040-6. PMID 10665833.
