= George Washington University School of Nursing =

Private college in Washington, D.C.

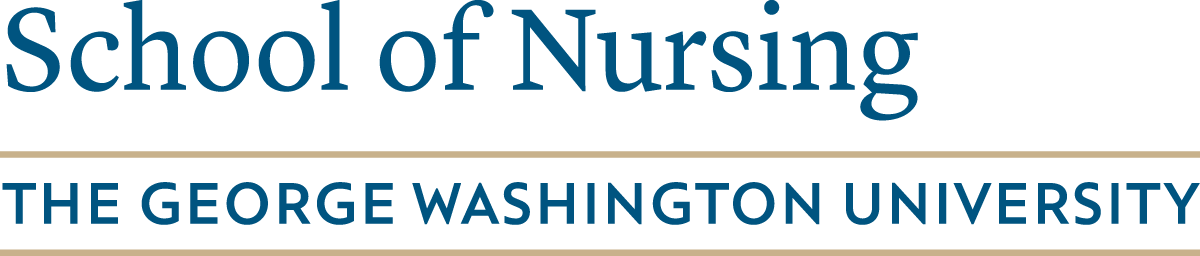
- Other names: GW Nursing
- Motto: Deus Nobis Fiducia (In God Our Trust)
- Type: Private
- Established: 2010
- Parent institution: George Washington University
- Dean: Susan Kelly-Weeder
- Undergraduates: 308
- Postgraduates: 418
- Location: 1919 Pennsylvania Ave. NW, Suite 500, Washington, D.C.
- Campus: Suburban
- Website: nursing.gwu.edu

The George Washington University School of Nursing (abbreviated as GW Nursing or GWSON) is the professional nursing school of the George Washington University, in Washington, D.C. Founded in 2010, GW Nursing is the newest of the 10 schools and colleges of George Washington University.

== History ==
The GW School of Nursing was established as the university's tenth academic institution in 2010, although the first nursing education at GW started in 1903.

== Facilities ==
The School of Nursing is located at both the Foggy Bottom Campus and the Virginia Science & Technology Campus (VSTC) in Ashburn, Virginia.

At the VSTC campus, GW Nursing offers students the access to the Simulation Learning and Innovation Center, including three clinical simulations spaces, covering more than 20,000 square feet, which are used for medical training.

== Organization and administration ==
The school's founding dean was Jean Johnson, who was succeeded by Pamela R. Jeffries. Dean Jeffries left GW in 2021 and was succeeded by Dean Susan Kelly-Weeder in 2023.

GW Nursing has cooperated with different local, national and international partners, e.g. offering a Nursing Scholar Program at GW Hospital, medical mission trips to Haiti or local health education projects in South Korea.

== Academics ==
As of 2025, the School of Nursing currently has over 60 faculty members. There are around 800 students enrolled in the School of Nursing. The school offers guaranteed admission to select community college students.

The school provides education at the bachelor's, master's, and doctorate level and also offers additional post-master's certificates. All graduate programs are online. The degrees are accredited by the Commission of Collegiate Nursing Education (CCNE), the Virginia Board of Nursing and the Washington, D.C., Board of Nursing.

=== Rankings ===
For the eighth year in a row, the George Washington University School of Nursing has earned multiple U.S. News and World Report top-10 rankings for Best Online Master's Programs. The school's online Master of Science in Nursing program was ranked #3 for nursing administration, psychiatric mental health, and programs for veterans; #4 for family nurse practitioner; and #6 for Best Online Mater's Programs: Grad Programs.

== Research ==
In 2018, GWSON launched a "students-first" program, to raise its research profile, integrating student feedback, strategic outlines and goals, launching a research award and implementing a new policy task force to improve administrative policies, fostering research excellence.

The school is home to different research centers and initiatives:

- The Center for Health Policy and Media Engagement
- The Center for Aging, Health and Humanities
- The Health Workforce Institute
