= Richard Green (neuropharmacologist) =

British neuropharmacologist (1944–2020)

Professor Richard Green
- Born: 1944 (age 81–82)
- Died: Sept 2020

Professor Richard Green (1944–2020) was a British neuropharmacologist.

Green obtained his PhD in 1969 under the supervision of Gerald Curzon, and then spent two years at the National Institute of Mental Health in Washington, D.C.

He then obtained a position at the Medical Research Council's clinical pharmacology unit in Oxford, rising to become its assistant unit director in 1981.

He took up the role of director of the Astra Neuroscience Research Unit in 1986. Ten years later he became director of the Global Discovery CNS & Pain Control, for Astra.

Upon formal retirement in 2007 he undertook psychopharmacology research as honorary professor of neuropharmacology at the University of Nottingham.

He was given his DSc by London University in 1988 and the British Association for Psychopharmacology's Lifetime Achievement Award in 2010.

He was a president emeritus of the British Pharmacological Society, and was elected an Honorary Fellow by them in 2013, and was a former president of the Serotonin Club.
