= Y S Bakhle =

British pharmacologist

Yeshwant S. Bakhle
- Born: 1936 (age 89–90)
- Occupation: Pharmacologist
- Employer: Imperial College London

Yeshwant S. Bakhle (born 1936), is a British pharmacologist.

Bakhle studied chemistry, with supplementary chemical pharmacology, in the Department of Pharmacology at the University of Oxford, later obtaining both a DPhil and, in 1993, a DSc there.

He spent two years at Yale University as a Fulbright Fellow, then in 1965 obtained a position at the Royal College of Surgeons' Department of Pharmacology under John Vane. He was appointed reader in biochemical pharmacology there in 1980.

Later in his career, he moved to the National Heart and Lung Institute at Imperial College London, as a senior research fellow, a position which became honorary upon his retirement.

He served as a senior editor at the British Journal of Pharmacology from 2001 to 2006, and was subsequently press editor there.

He became an Honorary Fellow of the British Pharmacological Society in 2002.
