= Pharmacology Research & Perspectives =

Academic journal

- Discipline: Pharmacology
- Language: English
- Edited by: Jennifer H. Martin

Publication details
- History: 2013-present
- Publisher: Wiley-Blackwell
- Frequency: Bimonthly
- Open access: Yes
- Impact factor: 2.3 (2024)

Standard abbreviations
- ISO 4: Pharmacol Res Perspect

Indexing
- CODEN: PRPHCA
- ISSN: 2052-1707
- OCLC no.: 875081105

Links
- Journal homepage; Online archive

Pharmacology Research & Perspectives is a bi-monthly peer-reviewed open access medical journal which publishes research over all aspects of drug action. The editor-in-chief is Jennifer H. Martin. The journal was established in 2013 as a joint endeavour between the British Pharmacological Society, the American Society for Pharmacology and Experimental Therapeutics and Wiley-Blackwell.

== Abstracting and indexing ==
The journal is abstracted and indexed in:

- EBSCO databases
- Biological Abstracts
- Chemical Abstracts Service
- Current Contents/Life Sciences
- Embase
- ProQuest databases
- Index Medicus, MEDLINE/PubMed
- Science Citation Index Expanded

According to the Journal Citation Reports, the journal has a 2024 impact factor of 2.3.
