= 7-Aminoflunitrazepam =

Relatively inactive metabolite of flunitrazepam

Names
- IUPAC name 7-Amino-5-(2-fluorophenyl)-1-methyl-3H-1,4-benzodiazepin-2-one

Identifiers
CAS Number	34084-50-9
3D model (JSmol)	Interactive image
ChEBI	CHEBI:174707
ChEMBL	ChEMBL151121
ChemSpider	83325
ECHA InfoCard	100.218.190
EC Number	690-803-8
PubChem CID	92294
UNII	7T03QW0G7C
CompTox Dashboard (EPA)	DTXSID40187682
- InChI: InChI=1S/C16H14FN3O/c1-20-14-7-6-10(18)8-12(14)16(19-9-15(20)21)11-4-2-3-5-13(11)17/h2-8H,9,18H2,1H3 Key: LTCDLGUFORGHGY-UHFFFAOYSA-N
- SMILES: CN1C(=O)CN=C(C2=C1C=CC(=C2)N)C3=CC=CC=C3F

Properties
Chemical formula	C_{16}H_{14}FN_{3}O
Molar mass	283.306 g·mol^{−1}
- Except where otherwise noted, data are given for materials in their standard state (at 25 °C [77 °F], 100 kPa). Infobox references

7-Aminoflunitrazepam is a benzodiazepine and a major metabolite of the drug flunitrazepam.

== Pharmacology ==
While it possesses the core benzodiazepine structure like its parent drug flunitrazepam, it is generally regarded as being inactive, with an assay determining it to have an IC_{50} value of 15381.5 μM at GABAA receptors. As a reference, the more potent parent drug flunitrazepam displaces diazepam binding with an IC_{50} quantified as 0.001700 μM.

=== Pharmacokinetics ===
The presence of 7-aminoflunitrazepam can be detected for up to 4 weeks in urine. Detection in oral fluid is also possible, but for considerably less time than in urine.

== Use ==
Due to being relatively inactive and a metabolite of flunitrazepam, it is usually instead used as a biomarker to confirm flunitrazepam poisoning/intoxication. Due to benzodiazepines, notably flunitrazepam, being frequently used as drugs to facilitate sexual assault, testing for the presence of flunitrazepam metabolites can be important steps in sexual assault investigations, where it is suspected that a drug has been used to facilitate the crime.
