= Teresa Webber =

British paleographer and medievalist

Mary Teresa Josephine Webber, FSA, FRHistS, FBA is a British palaeographer, medievalist, and academic. She has been a Fellow of Trinity College, Cambridge since 1997 and Professor of Palaeography at the Faculty of History, University of Cambridge since 2018. Webber studied Modern History as an undergraduate at Somerville College, Oxford.

== Honours ==
In 2001, Webber was elected a Fellow of the Royal Historical Society (FRHistS). On 5 June 2003, she was elected a Fellow of the Society of Antiquaries of London (FSA). In July 2017, she was elected a Fellow of the British Academy (FBA), the United Kingdom's national academy for the humanities and social sciences.

From 2015 to 2016, Webber held the J. P. R. Lyell Reader in Bibliography at the University of Oxford. She therefore delivered the Lyell Lectures for that academic year: her lecture series was titled "Public Reading and its Books: Monastic Ideals and Practice in England c. 1000-c. 1300".

== Selected works ==
- Webber, Teresa (1992). Scribes and Scholars at Salisbury Cathedral c.1075- c.1125. Oxford: Clarendon. ISBN 978-0198203087.
- Webber, T.; Watson, A. G. (1998). The Libraries of the Augustinian Canons, Corpus of British Medieval Library Catalogues, vol. 6. London: British Library Publishing Division. ISBN 978-0712345019.
- Leedham-Green, Elisabeth; Webber, Teresa, eds. (2006). The Cambridge History of Libraries in Britain and Ireland: Volume 1, To 1640. Cambridge: Cambridge University Press. ISBN 978-0521781947.
