= Dormant therapy =

The term dormant therapy refers to a new drug or a new biological product which was made the subject of a request for designation in compliance with the Dormant Therapies Act. According to the legislation, the assignment of dormant therapy is given to a drug or new biological product that has been determined to have insufficient patent protection and meets an unmet medical need, improves outcomes, or reduces risks compared to an existing treatment.

Many drugs may be abandoned due to their failure to meet a clinical endpoint. Over time, manufacturers wanting to re-investigate the abandoned drug will not because the patent for the drug has expired or will expire prior to the completion of research and the federal approval process. Weak or no patent protection is a disincentive for drug development as it hinders a manufacturer's ability to recoup the investment in expensive clinical trials. This disincentive is even more pronounced for treatments for more complex conditions such as Alzheimer's, which require more clinical data than conditions which currently have existing treatments.
