= John Gaddum =

English pharmacologist (1900–1965)

Sir John Gaddum FRS FRSE
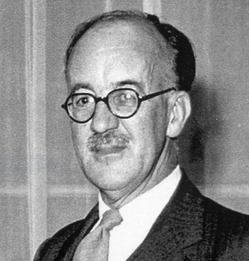
- John Gaddum, c. 1960
- Born: John Henry Gaddum; 31 March 1900; Hale, Cheshire, England
- Died: 30 June 1965 (aged 65); Cambridge, England
- Education: Rugby School; Trinity College, Cambridge
- Known for: first scientist to postulate that 5-HT might have a role in mood regulation
- Awards: Fellow of the Royal Society; Member of the German Academy of Sciences Leopoldina
- Scientific career
- Fields: Pharmacology
- Workplaces: Cairo University; University College London; University of Edinburgh; Porton Down

Sir John Henry Gaddum FRS FRSE (31 March 1900 – 30 June 1965) was an English pharmacologist who, along with Ulf von Euler, co-discovered the neuropeptide Substance P in 1931. He was a founder member of the British Pharmacological Society and first editor of the British Journal of Pharmacology.

== Early life and education ==
He was born in Hale (now part of Manchester) the son of silk merchant, Henry Edwin Gaddum and his wife Phyllis Mary Barratt. He was educated at Moorland House School, Heswall, Cheshire; Rugby School; and Trinity College, Cambridge.

He completed his BSc in Physiology at the University of Cambridge in 1922, and his MD at University College London in 1925. His first role was to assist J. W. Trevan at the Wellcome Physiological Research Laboratories.

== Career ==
From 1927 to 1933, Gaddum worked under Henry Dale at the National Institute for Medical Research, and helped develop the classical laws of drug antagonism. He showed that sympathetic nerves release adrenaline. Together with Ulf von Euler, he established the release of acetylcholine in autonomic ganglia.

From 1933 to 1935, Gaddum was professor of pharmacology at the University of Cairo. Subsequent to this he took up a chair at University College London, from 1935 to 1938 and University of London from 1938 to 1942. During the Second World War he advised the War Office on potential use of toxins and biological weapons. He was given the rank of Lt Colonel.

Gaddum was professor of pharmacology at the University of Edinburgh from 1942 to 1958.

In 1943 he was elected a Fellow of the Royal Society of Edinburgh. His proposers were James Pickering Kendall, James Couper Brash, Thomas J. Mackie and James Ritchie. He served as the Society's Vice-President 1951–54. In 1945 he was elected a Fellow of the Royal Society of London.

He was director of the Institute of Animal Physiology (later Babraham Institute) from 1958 to 1965.

In the New Year Honours 1964 Gaddum was made appointed a Knight Bachelor. and invested by The Duke of Edinburgh.

In experiments with lysergic acid diethylamide (LSD), Gaddum explained how it causes mental disturbances by blocking the stimulating effects of serotonin. He was the first scientist to postulate that 5-HT might have a role in mood regulation.

In 1962 he was elected a Member of the German Academy of Sciences Leopoldina. Edinburgh University awarded him an honorary doctorate (LLD) in 1964.

He died in Cambridge on 30 June 1965. There is a plaque commemorating Gaddum on the wall behind Babraham church which backs onto the Babraham Institute site.

== Publications ==
- "Gaddum's Pharmacology" (1948) considered a definitive work for decades.

== Military service ==
Gaddum served in the British Army from 1940 to 42, rising to lieutenant colonel.

== Personal life ==
In 1929, Gaddum married Iris Mary Harmer in Royston, Hertfordshire. They had three daughters: Susan M. Gaddum (born 1930), Ann R. Gaddum (born 1932), and Phyllis L. Gaddum (born 1937).
