= Pamela R. Jeffries =

American nurse educator

Academic background
- Education: Indiana University

Pamela R. Jeffries is an American professor of nursing and serves as dean of Vanderbilt University School of Nursing.

== Early life and education ==
Jeffries graduated with a B.S. in Nursing from Ball State University, Indiana, in 1976 and subsequently obtained M.Sc. and Ph.D. degrees in Nursing from Indiana University Bloomington (IU) in 1982 and 1996 respectively.

== Career ==
Jeffries started her career as an assistant professor of nursing at the IU School of Nursing and later served as faculty member of the Graduate School and as associate dean of undergraduate programs. She then served as senior associate dean for academic affairs and since 2009, as professor at Johns Hopkins School of Nursing. In 2013, she was named vice provost for digital initiatives at Johns Hopkins University.

In 2015, Jeffries was announced as the new dean of the George Washington School of Nursing. In 2021, she became the ninth dean at Vanderbilt University School of Nursing, where she also holds the title of Valere Potter Distinguished Professor of Nursing.

Throughout her career, Jeffries has also worked with different organizations, both private and public, and served on the National Council State Board of Nursing.

Jeffries is recognized for her work on simulations and online teaching and learning and she regularly speaks at national and international events, regarding her areas of expertise.

She serves as director of the Leadership Program for Simulation Educators and is the president and fellow of the Society for Simulation in Healthcare (SSH). She also serves as a member of the American Academy of Nursing's National Advisory Council.

Jeffries has authored, co-authored and edited several books, articles and other media. Her book "Simulation in Nursing Education" has been named an AJN Book of the Year in 2013.

== Memberships and recognitions ==
Jeffries is a fellow and member of different professional networks and organizations. She is a fellow of the American Academy of Nursing (FAAN), fellow of the Society for Simulation in Healthcare Academy (FSSH), fellow of the Academy of Nurse Educators (ANEF), and inductee into the Sigma Theta Tau International Research Hall of Fame.

In 2011, she became a fellow with the Robert Wood Johnson Foundation.

In 1999, Jeffries received a President's Award for excellent teaching and research at Indiana University. In 2005, she was awarded the Hall of Honor Award by the International Nursing Association of Clinical Simulations and Learning and in 2007, became a fellow of the National League of Nursing.

In 2013, she was bestowed the Scholarship of Teaching and Learning Excellence Award and in 2016, received the Teaching and Learning Excellence Award by the American Association of Colleges of Nursing.
