= John Hopewell =

John Hopewell (1 December 1920 – 14 January 2015) was a British urologist, a pioneer in both kidney dialysis and transplantation.
