= Postgraduate Medical Journal =

- Discipline: Medicine
- Language: English
- Edited by: Bernard Cheung

Publication details
- History: 1925–present
- Publisher: Oxford University Press on behalf of the Fellowship of Postgraduate Medicine (United Kingdom)
- Frequency: Monthly
- Open access: Hybrid
- Impact factor: 5.1 (2021)

Standard abbreviations
- ISO 4: Postgrad. Med. J.

Indexing
- CODEN: PGMJAO
- ISSN: 0032-5473 (print); 1469-0756 (web)
- OCLC no.: 01762715

Links
- Journal homepage; Online access; Online archive

The Postgraduate Medical Journal is a monthly peer-reviewed medical journal that was established in 1925 by the Fellowship of Postgraduate Medicine, of which it is the official journal. It is currently published on behalf of the Fellowship by the Oxford University Press.

== Scope ==
The journal aims to contribute to the continuing professional development of physicians by publishing papers on a wide range of topics relevant to practicing clinicians and teachers. It covers translational research on clinical practice (translational medicine) in all branches of medicine and papers on medical education and medical education research. It publishes different types of articles, including original research papers, reviews, quality improvement reports, editorials, and correspondence.

== Abstracting and indexing ==
The journal is abstracted and indexed in the Science Citation Index, Current Contents/Clinical Medicine, and the Index Medicus/PubMed/MEDLINE. According to the Journal Citation Reports, the journal has a 2017 impact factor of 2.078.

== Conferences ==
The journal organises occasional conferences in partnership with the Fellowship of Postgraduate Medicine. In 2015, the fellowship organised a conference to mark the 90th anniversary of the journal. In May 2018, jointly with the journal and the University of Hong Kong, the fellowship organised a clinical updates session at the Hong Kong Medical Forum.
