= British Pharmacological Society =

British society of pharmacologists

- British Pharmacological Society
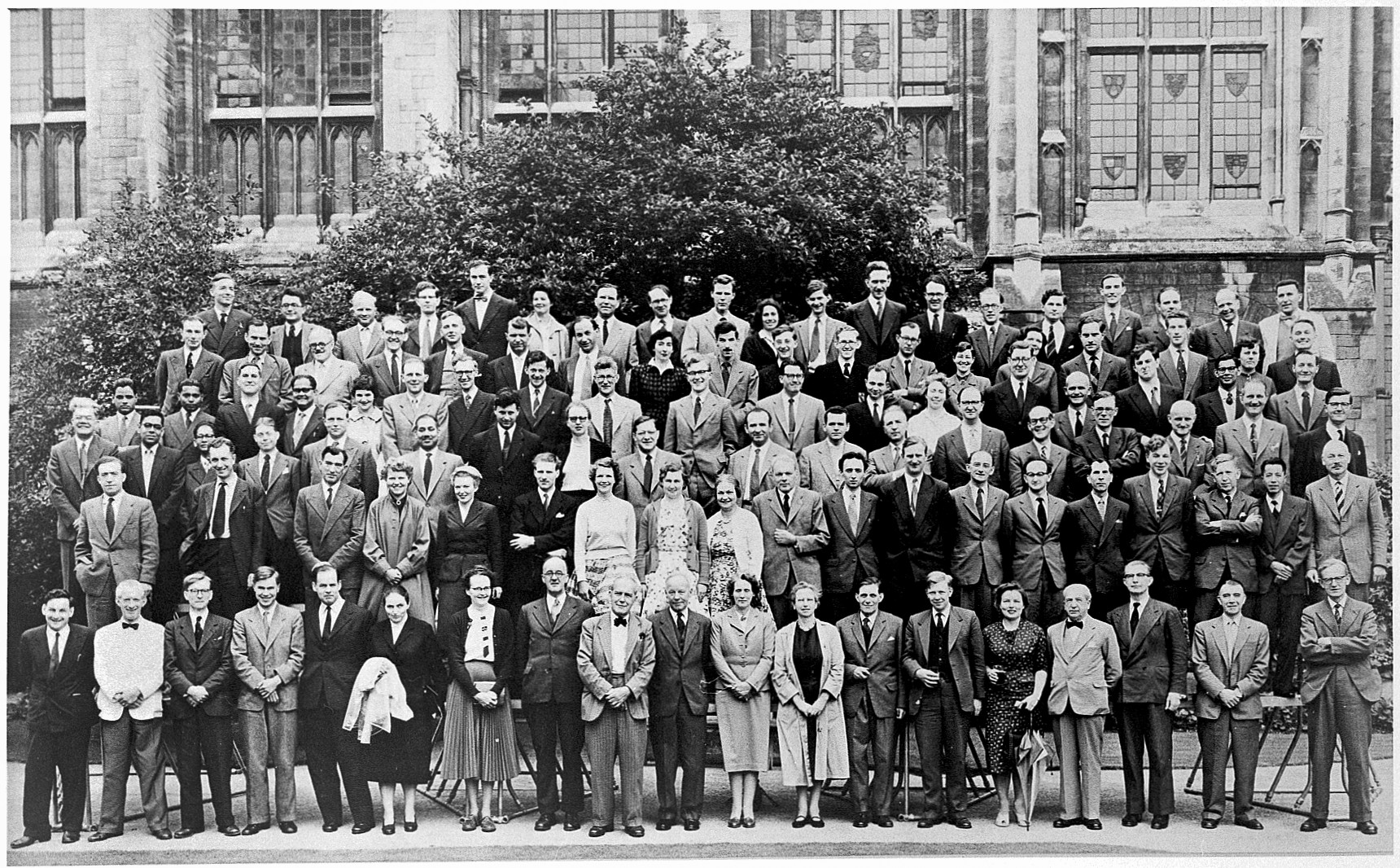
- A group photo of the British Pharmacological Society
- Formation: 1931; 95 years ago
- Region served: United Kingdom

The British Pharmacological Society is the primary UK learned society for pharmacologists, concerned with research into drugs and the ways in which they work. Members work in academia, industry, regulatory agencies, and the health services, and many are medically qualified. The Society covers the whole spectrum of pharmacology, including laboratory, clinical, and toxicological aspects.

Clinical pharmacology is the medical speciality dedicated to promoting safe and effective use of medicines for patient benefit. Many clinical pharmacologists work as consultants in the National Health Service and many hold prominent positions in UK universities and in regulatory bodies, such as the Medicines and Healthcare products Regulatory Agency (MHRA) and the National Institute of Health and Care Excellence (NICE).

== History ==
The Society was founded in 1931, in Oxford, by a group of about 20 pharmacologists. They were brought together on the initiative of Professor James Andrew Gunn, through a letter signed by Gunn, Henry H. Dale, and Walter E. Dixon, and sent to the heads of university departments of pharmacology and of institutions for pharmacological research in Great Britain, with proposals for the formation of a pharmacological club. There were favorable replies to this letter, and most of the recipients met in Wadham College, Oxford, on the evening of 3 July 1931, the day before the meeting of the Physiological Society. Gunn presided over the meeting. It was agreed that a Society should be founded, to meet at least once a year for the reading of papers on pharmacological subjects and discussions of questions of teaching and publications and to promote friendly relations between pharmacologists.

The first female member of the society was Mary Pickford (1935), and other early eminent women members included Marthe Vogt and Edith Bülbring.

== Publications ==
The British Pharmacological Society publishes several works that promote pharmacology and clinical pharmacology:

- The British Journal of Pharmacology is published by Wiley
- The British Journal of Clinical Pharmacology is published by Wiley
- Pharmacology Research & Perspectives is published by ASPET, the British Pharmacological Society, and Wiley.
- Pharmacology Matters (originally called pA2) is the house magazine of the British Pharmacological Society.
- pA2 Online is published by the British Pharmacological Society.

Between 1990 and 1994, the Society collaborated with Macmillan on the journal Molecular Neuropharmacology, which has since ceased publication.

== Presidents ==
The office of president was formally created in 1999. Before that the role was taken by members of the society under titles such as secretary and general secretary. Since 2010, all previous general secretaries and presidents have been awarded the title president emeritus.

Secretary and treasurer

- 1931 - M. H. MacKeith
- 1934 - Joshua Harold Burn
- 1945 - Frank R. Winton

Secretary

- 1947 - George Brownlee
- 1952 - D. R. Wood
- 1955 - Miles Weatherall
- 1956 - D. R. Wood
- 1957 - Walter L. M. Perry
- 1961 - James D. P. Graham

General secretary

- 1968 - Juan P. Quilliam
- 1971 - John R. Vane
- 1974 - James F. Mitchell
- 1977 - G. P. Lewis
- 1980 - A. Michael Barrett
- 1983 - Anthony ('Tony') Birmingham
- 1986 - Geoffrey N. Woodruff
- 1989 - A. Richard. Green
- 1992 - Jennifer Maclagan
- 1995 - Norman G. Bowery
- 1998 - Tom P. Blackburn

President

- 1999 - Norman G. Bowery
- 2001 - Rod. J. Flower
- 2004 - Julia C. Buckingham
- 2006 - Graeme Henderson
- 2008 - Jeffrey K. Aronson
- 2010 - Raymond G. Hill
- 2012 - Philip A. Routledge
- 2014 - Humphrey P. Rang
- 2016 - David Webb
- 2018 - Stephen Hill
- 2020 - Munir Pirmohamed
- 2022 - Clive Page
- 2024 - Mark Caulfield
- 2026 - Cherry Wainwright

== Eminent pharmacologists ==
The society elects eminent, deceased contributors to the subject of pharmacology, whether or not they were members, to the Pharmacology Hall of Fame:

- James Black
- Bill Bowman
- Edith Bülbring
- Henry Hallett Dale
- Derrick Dunlop
- John Gaddum
- Hans Kosterlitz
- Heinz Otto Schild
- John Vane
- Marthe Vogt

Members of the society awarded the Nobel Prize in Physiology or Medicine include Black, Dale and Vane.

== Fellows of the society ==
Fellowships (FBPhS) of the society are awarded to members who have made significant contributions to both the study of pharmacology and the Society. A full list of Fellows is available here. Honorary Fellowships (HonFBPhS) are awarded to member or non-members for distinguished and sustained leadership role in Pharmacology. Fellows and Honorary Fellows use the post-nominal FBPhS. Notable current honorary fellows include:

- Jeffrey K Aronson, president emeritus and former editor-in-chief, British Journal of Clinical Pharmacology
- Y S Bakhle
- Sir Peter Barnes
- Michael Berridge
- Dame Kate Bingham
- Thomas Blackburn
- Susan Brain
- Sir Mark Caulfield, chief scientist for Genomics England
- Judy MacArthur Clark
- Sir Rory Collins
- David Colquhoun
- John H. Coote
- Dame Sally Davies
- Sir Gordon Duff, former chairman of the Medicines and Healthcare products Regulatory Agency; former principal St Hilda's College, Oxford.
- Robin E Ferner
- Garret A. FitzGerald
- Roderick Flower, president emeritus
- Sir Charles George
- Dame Sarah Gilbert
- Nuala Helsby, professor of molecular medicine and pathology in New Zealand
- Graeme Henderson, president emeritus
- Raymond Hill, president emeritus
- Stephen Hill, president emeritus
- David Lawson, former chairman of the Committee on the Review of Medicines (CRM) and of the Medicines Commission
- Hilary Little
- Ian McGrath, former editor-in-chief, British Journal of Pharmacology
- Sir Salvador Moncada
- David Nutt
- Sir Munir Pirmohamed, president emeritus, president, Association of Physicians of Great Britain and Ireland
- Dame Nancy Rothwell
- Philip Routledge, former chairman, All Wales Medicines Strategy Group
- Sir Patrick Vallance, former chief scientific adviser, UK Government
- Tom Walley, former director, Health Technology Assessment (HTA) Programme, National Institute for Health Research (NIHR)
- David Webb, President Emeritus
- Sir Christopher Whitty, Chief Medical Officer (CMO), England, and Chief Medical Adviser, UK Government
- Sir Kent Woods, former director of the NHS Health Technology Assessment Programme, chief executive of the Medicines and Healthcare products Regulatory Agency (MHRA), and chairman of the management board of the European Medicines Agency

== See also ==
- Pharmacology
- Clinical pharmacology
- Wiley
