= European Journal of Clinical Pharmacology =

- Discipline: Pharmacology
- Language: English
- Edited by: Rune Dahlqvist

Publication details
- Former name(s): Pharmacologia Clinica
- History: 1968-present
- Publisher: Springer Science+Business Media
- Frequency: Monthly
- Open access: upon paying open access fee
- Impact factor: 2.7 (2024)

Standard abbreviations
- ISO 4: Eur. J. Clin. Pharmacol.

Indexing
- CODEN: EJCPAS
- ISSN: 0031-6970 (print); 1432-1041 (web)
- OCLC no.: 41916239

Links
- Journal homepage; Online access

The European Journal of Clinical Pharmacology is a peer-reviewed medical journal published by Springer Science+Business Media since 1968. It covers all aspects of clinical pharmacology and drug therapy in humans.

According to the Journal Citation Reports, the journal received a 2014 impact factor of 2.966, ranking it 84th out of 254 journals in the category Pharmacology & Pharmacy.
