= Clinical Therapeutics =

- Discipline: Clinical pharmacology
- Language: English
- Edited by: Richard I. Shader

Publication details
- History: 1977-present
- Publisher: Elsevier
- Frequency: Monthly
- Open access: Hybrid
- Impact factor: 2.947 (2016)

Standard abbreviations
- ISO 4: Clin. Ther.

Indexing
- CODEN: CLTHDG
- ISSN: 0149-2918
- OCLC no.: 43029633

Links
- Journal homepage; Online access; Online archive

Clinical Therapeutics is a monthly peer-reviewed medical journal that was established in 1977 and is published by Elsevier. The journal covers all aspects of clinical pharmacology and therapeutics.

== Abstracting and indexing ==
The journal is abstracted and indexed in:

- BIOSIS Previews
- CINAHL
- Cambridge Scientific Abstracts
- Cancerlit
- Chemical Abstracts
- Current Awareness in Biological Sciences
- Current Contents/Clinical Medicine
- EMBASE
- MEDLINE/PubMed
- Scopus

According to the Journal Citation Reports, the journal has a 2016 impact factor of 2.947.
