= British Journal of Clinical Pharmacology =

- Discipline: Pharmacology
- Language: English
- Edited by: Serge Cremers

Publication details
- History: 1974–present
- Publisher: Wiley-Blackwell on behalf of the British Pharmacological Society (United Kingdom)
- Frequency: Monthly
- Open access: Delayed after 12 months, hybrid
- Impact factor: 3.0 (2024)

Standard abbreviations
- ISO 4: Br. J. Clin. Pharmacol.

Indexing
- CODEN: BCPHBM
- ISSN: 0306-5251 (print); 1365-2125 (web)
- OCLC no.: 45425630

Links
- Journal homepage; Online access; Online archive

The British Journal of Clinical Pharmacology is a monthly peer-reviewed medical journal published by Wiley-Blackwell on behalf of the British Pharmacological Society. It covers all aspects of drug action in humans. As of 2020, the editor-in-chief is Serge Cremers (Columbia University).

== History ==
The journal was established in 1974. It was initially published by Macmillan, and moved to be published by Blackwell (since Wiley-Blackwell) in 1983.

The early editors were known as Chairmen of the Editorial Board, until January 2007, when the title was changed to what it is currently, namely Editor-in-Chief.

The following is a list of all previous Chairmen or Editors-in-Chief:

- Graham M Wilson† (University of Glasgow) (1974–7)
- Colin T Dollery† (Royal Postgraduate Medical School, London) (1978–82)
- Alasdair M Breckenridge† (University of Liverpool) (1983–8)
- David G Grahame-Smith† (University of Oxford) (1988–95)
- Geoffrey T Tucker (University of Sheffield) (1995–2002)
- Jeffrey K Aronson (University of Oxford) (2003–7)
- James M Ritter (King's College London) (2008–14)
- Adam F Cohen (Leiden University) (2015–19)

†Deceased

== Abstracting and indexing ==
According to the Journal Citation Reports, the journal has a 2024 impact factor of 3.0, ranking it 138th out of 352 journals in the category Pharmacology & Pharmacy.
