= Clinical pharmacology =

Type of pharmacology

- Skeletal structure of Oxycodone; clinical pharmacologists evaluate drugs before they are approved
- Focus: Pharmacology; Toxicology
- Specialist: Clinical pharmacologist

Clinical pharmacology is "that discipline that teaches, does research, frames policy, gives information and advice about the actions and proper uses of medicines in humans and implements that knowledge in clinical practice". Clinical pharmacology is inherently a translational discipline underpinned by the basic science of pharmacology, engaged in the experimental and observational study of the disposition and effects of drugs in humans, and committed to the translation of science into evidence-based therapeutics. It has a broad scope, from the discovery of new target molecules to the effects of drug usage in whole populations. The main aim of clinical pharmacology is to generate data for optimum use of drugs and the practice of 'evidence-based medicine'.

Clinical pharmacologists have medical and scientific training that enables them to evaluate evidence and produce new data through well-designed studies. Clinical pharmacologists must have access to enough patients for clinical care, teaching and education, and research. Their responsibilities to patients include, but are not limited to, detecting and analysing adverse drug effects and reactions, therapeutics, and toxicology including reproductive toxicology, perioperative drug management, and psychopharmacology.

Modern clinical pharmacologists are also trained in data analysis skills. Their approaches to analyse data can include modelling and simulation techniques (e.g. population analysis, non-linear mixed-effects modelling).

== Branches ==
Clinical pharmacology consists of multiple branches listed below:

- Pharmacodynamics – what drugs do to the body and how. This includes not just the cellular and molecular aspects, but also more relevant clinical measurements. For example, not just the pharmacological actions of salbutamol, a beta2-adrenergic receptor agonist, but the respiratory peak flow rate of both healthy volunteers and patients.
- Pharmacokinetics – what happens to the drug while in the body. This involves the body systems for handling the drug, usually divided into the following classification:
  - Absorption – the processes by which the drug move into the bloodstream from the site of administration (e.g. the gut)
  - Distribution – the extent to which the drug enters and leaves different tissues of the body
  - Metabolism – the processes by which the drug is metabolized in the liver, i.e. transformed into molecules that are usually less pharmacologically active
  - Excretion – the processes by which the drug is eliminated from the body, which mostly happens in the liver and kidneys.
- Rational Prescribing – using the right medication, in the right dose, using the right route and frequency of administration, and for the right duration of time.
- Adverse drug effects – unwanted effects of a medicine that are typically not noticed by the individual (e.g. a reduction in the white cell count or a change in the serum uric acid concentration)
- Adverse drug reactions – unwanted effects of the drug that the individual experiences (e.g. a sore throat because of a reduced white cell count or an attack of gout because of an increased serum uric acid concentration)
- Toxicology – the discipline that deals with the adverse effects of chemicals
- Drug interactions – the study of how drugs interact with each other. A drug may negatively or positively affect the effects of another drug; drugs can also interact with other agents, such as foods, alcohol, and devices.
- Drug development – the processes of bringing a new medicine from its discovery to clinical use, usually culminating in some form of clinical trials and marketing authorization applications to country-specific drug regulators, such as the US FDA and the UK's MHRA.
- Molecular pharmacology – the discipline of studying drug actions at the molecular level; it is a branch of pharmacology in general.
- Pharmacogenomics – the study of the human genome in order to understand the ways in which genetic factors determine the actions of medicines.

== History ==
Medicinal uses of plant and animal resources have been common since prehistoric times. Many countries, such as China, Egypt, and India, have written documentation of many traditional remedies. A few of these remedies are still regarded as helpful today, but most have them have been discarded, because they were ineffective and potentially harmful.

For many years, therapeutic practices were based on Hippocratic humoral theory, popularized by the Greek physician Galen (129 – c. AD 216) and not on experimentation.

In around the 17th century physicians started to apply use methods to study traditional remedies, although they still lacked methods to test the hypotheses they had about how drugs worked.

By the late 18th century and early 19th century, methods of experimental physiology and pharmacology began to be developed by scientists such as François Magendie and his student Claude Bernard.

From the late 18th century to the early 20th century, advances were made in chemistry and physiology that laid the foundations needed to understand how drugs act at the tissue and organ levels. The advances that were made at this time gave manufacturers the ability to make and sell medicines that they claimed to be effective, but were in many cases worthless. There were no methods for evaluating such claims until rational therapeutic concepts were established in medicine, starting at about the end of the 19th century.

The development of receptor theory at the start of the 20th century and later developments led to better understanding of how medicines act and the development of many new medicines that are both safe and effective. Expansion of the scientific principles of pharmacology and clinical pharmacology continues today.

== See also ==
- Dormant therapy
