= Department of Pharmacology, University of Oxford =

Academic department in the UK

Coordinates: 51.758058°N 1.251366°W

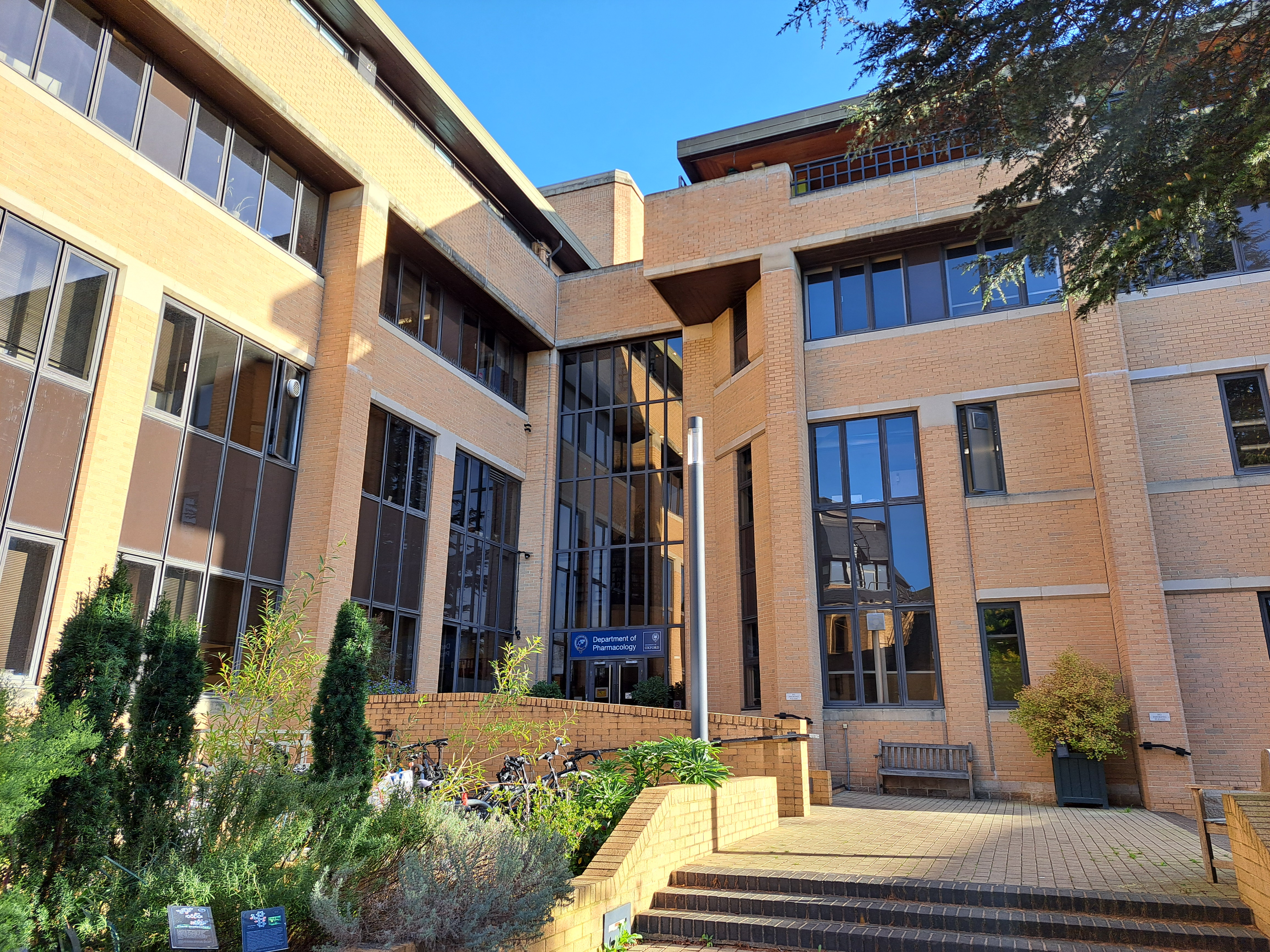
- Established: 1898
- Location: Oxford
- Website: https://www.pharm.ox.ac.uk/

The Department of Pharmacology is an academic department of the Medical Sciences Division at the University of Oxford in Oxford, England, United Kingdom.

It focuses on basic life sciences research, undergraduate teaching for medical and biomedical sciences students and training and development of graduate students. The building is located on Mansfield Road.

== History ==
In Oxford the Botanic Garden was founded in 1621 to grow plants for medicinal use and research. 'Chemical Pharmacology' was being taught by chemist James Ernest Marsh FRS as early as 1890 in the Oxford University Museum of Natural History.

The Department of Pharmacology was founded in 1898 with the appointment of Dr William John Smith Jerome as a 'Lecturer on Medical Pharmacology and Materia Medica'. Smith Jerome delivered an introductory lecture for a public audience in the museum on 'Pharmacology: its Aims and Methods', published in The Lancet.

=== 1898–1908: first lecturer ===
William John Smith Jerome (1839–1929) taught pharmacology for a decade while carrying out research into the formation of uric acid and the development of gout He had previously established the Royal Children's Hospital, Melbourne, and had been a curator of a pathology museum in Melbourne, and a lecturer in botany in Charing Cross Hospital, and carried out research in Germany, with papers published in the Plügers Archiv between 1883 and 1895. A report on teaching medicine in Oxford in the British Medical Journal in 1906 described Smith Jerome as an excellent teacher, but said that he was teaching in the Oxford University Museum of Natural History in an "out-house in the Museum ground" with inadequate facilities. In 1908 Smith Jerome resigned and moved to Italy. He published a paper on the physiological action for an Italian method for treating respiratory infections through salt inhalation.

=== 1912–1937: first statutory chair ===
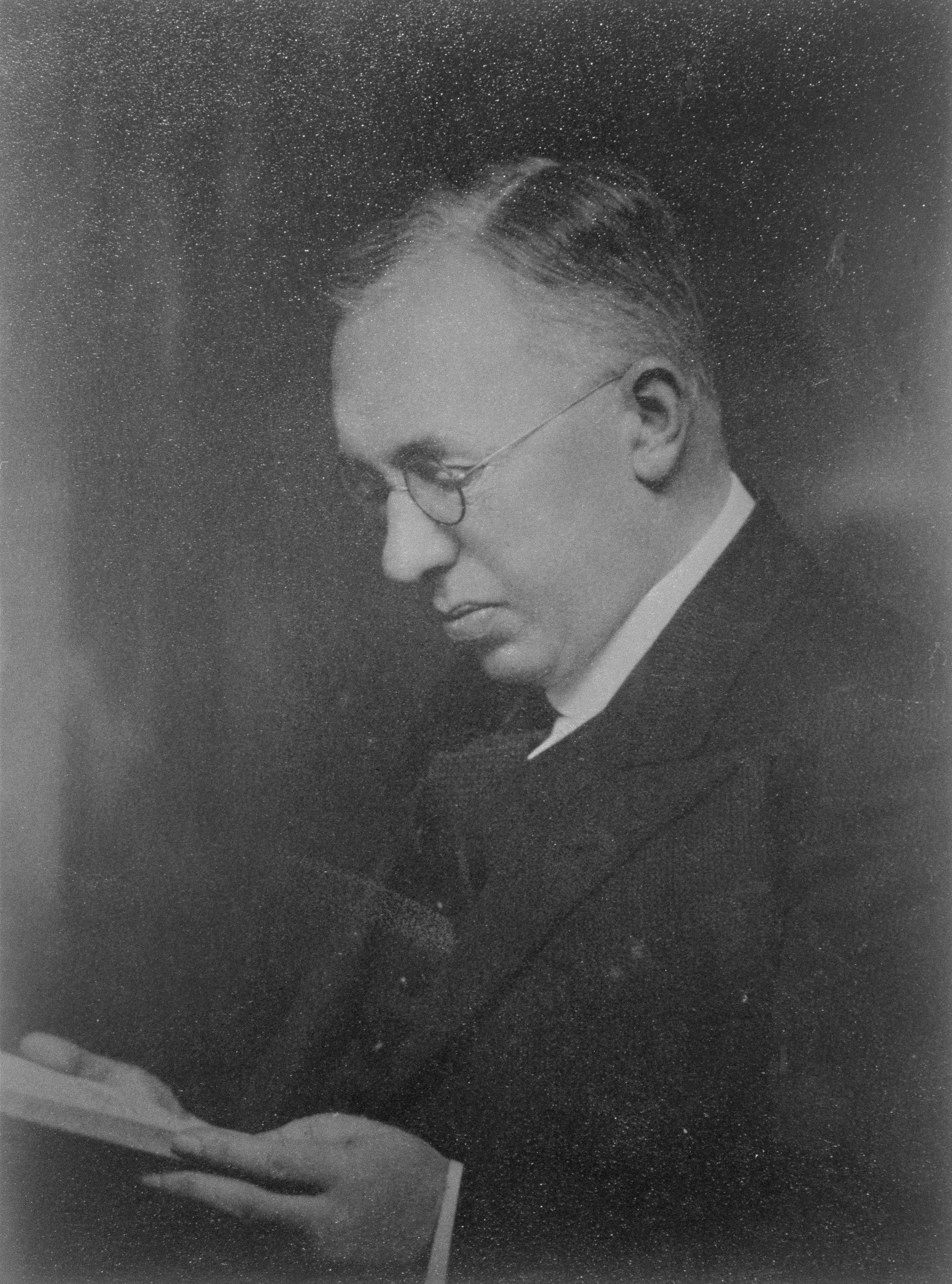
James Andrew Gunn

James Andrew Gunn (1882–1958) was appointed Reader in Pharmacology in 1912, with a newly-refurbished space for teaching and research in the Oxford University Museum of Natural History. He had gained five degrees at the University of Edinburgh, and in 1917 he was appointed the first Professor of Pharmacology in Oxford. During World War I he served in the Royal Army Medical Corps. Following an endowment from the Sir William Dunn Trustees for a new building for pathology in 1927, Gunn proposed using the vacated pathology building in South Parks Road for pharmacology. Gunn's proposal was supported with funding to refurbish the building with teaching and research facilities, and to expand the departmental library.

In 1931 Gunn initiated the creation of the British Pharmacological Society with a letter signed jointly with Sir Henry Dale and Dr Walter E. Dixon. The first meeting took place in Oxford on Friday 3 July 1931, with papers being presented the following day in the Department of Pharmacology. Gunn's research included investigating the actions of compounds related to adrenaline, and on alkaloids of Peganum harmala.

=== 1937–1959: second statutory chair ===
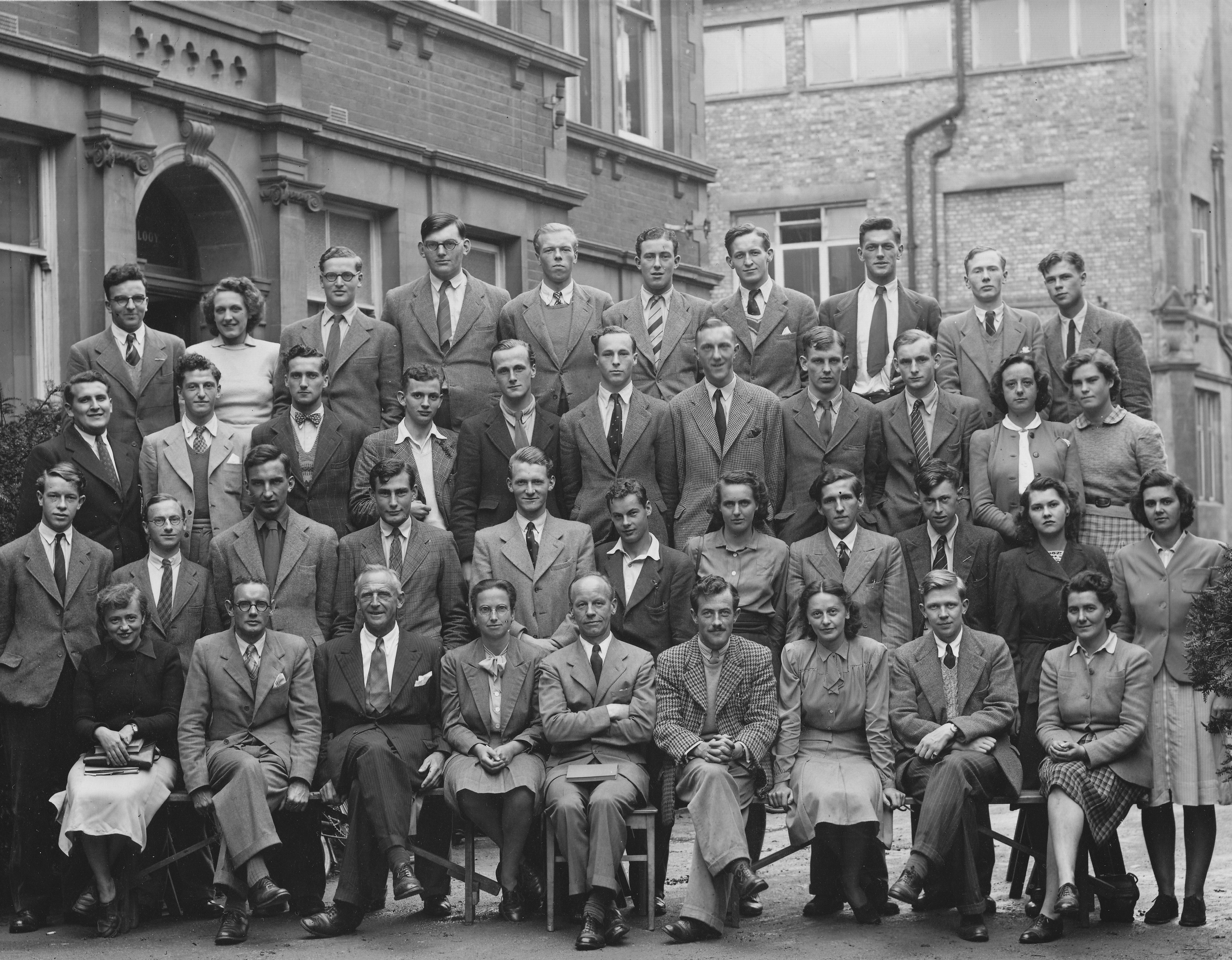
Photograph of the department in 1945: Burn front row in centre, on his right Bulbring, Heaton and Ling.

Prior to Oxford, Joshua Harold Burn FRS (1892–1981) worked with Sir Henry Hallett Dale and then became director of the Pharmacological Laboratories at the Pharmaceutical Society of Great Britain. On his appointment in Oxford, Burn invited Edith Bülbring to join him as his assistant along with technician H.W. Ling. Burn designed a course for teaching medical students that took an experimental approach to pharmacology based on physiology. He expanded research in the department and encouraged community, with daily lunches in the library often accompanied with music by departmental members. The Vice-chancellor described the Department of Pharmacology as the "happiest family in Oxford". Over the years Burn had 162 co-workers in Oxford, including Edith Bülbring, Hugh Blaschko and Sir John Vane.

Burn worked on the internal control of the body by the autonomic nervous system, carrying out seminal work on the release of noradrenaline from these nerves and introducing the controversial Burn-Rand hypothesis. Burn won the first Wellcome Gold Medal of the British Pharmacological Society in 1979.

=== 1959-1984 - 3rd statutory chair ===
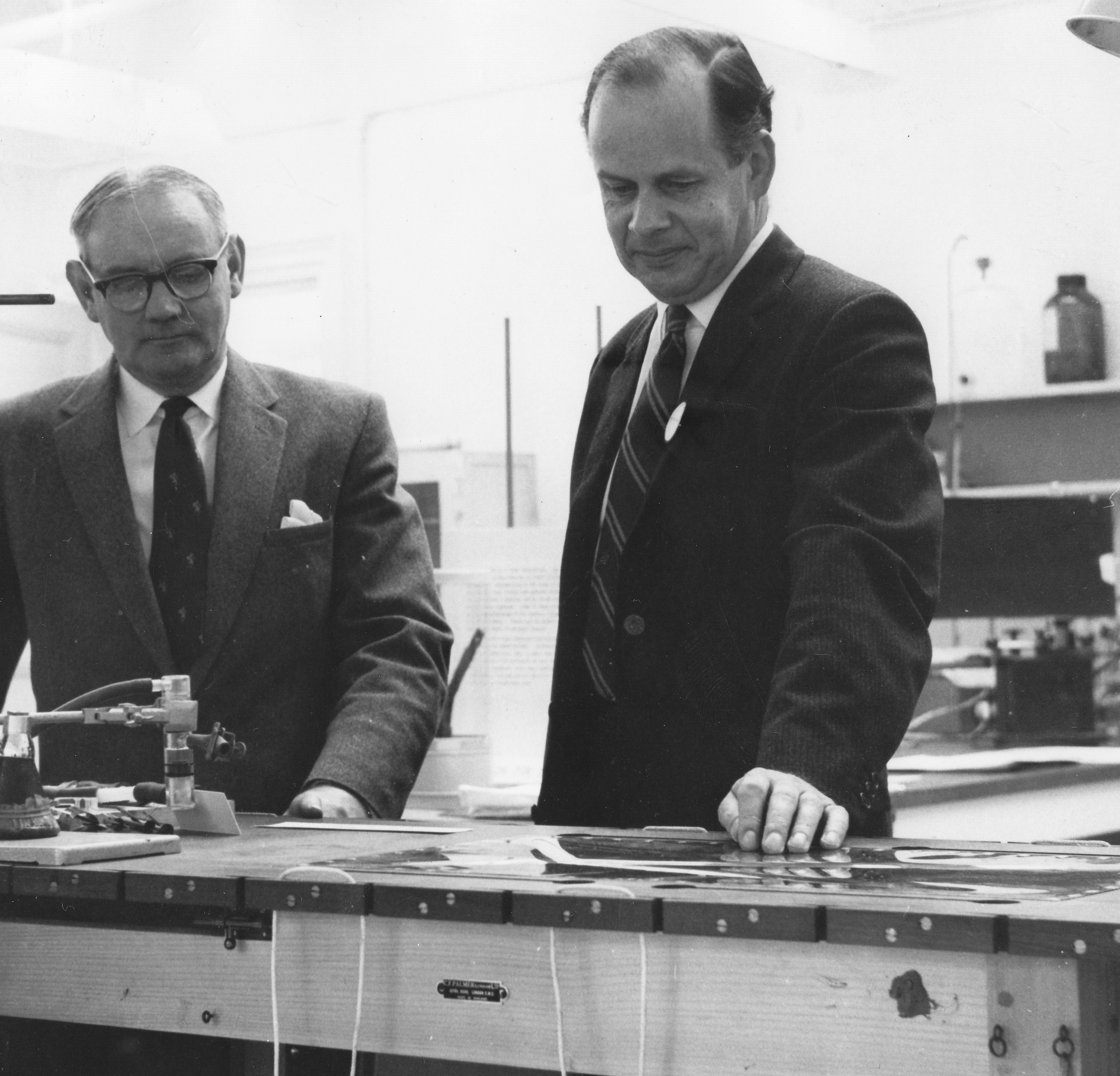
Paton (right) and Ling (left) in the laboratory in 1962.

Sir William Paton FRS (1917-1993) was appointed in 1959. He was awarded a CBE in 1968 and a knighthood in 1979. Prior to Oxford he had worked in the National Institute of Medical Research, had been a Reader in Pharmacology in UCL and then Professor of Pharmacology in the Royal College of Surgeons. In NIMR he discovered with Eleanor Zaimis two different actions of the neurotransmitter acetylcholine; causing muscles to contract, and to increase blood pressure. They found these actions can be separated with two antagonist drugs: decamethonium to relax muscles which can be used in surgery, while hexamethonium became the first drug to safely lower blood pressure.

In Oxford he set up a research group investigating the pharmacology of cannabis with concerns that use would lead to heroin addiction. At one time he was a member of 72 committees including Chairman of Research Defence Society and Trustee of the Wellcome Trust. In 1991 he was awarded the 7th Wellcome Gold Medal from the British Pharmacological Society.

=== 1984-2005 - 4th statutory chair ===
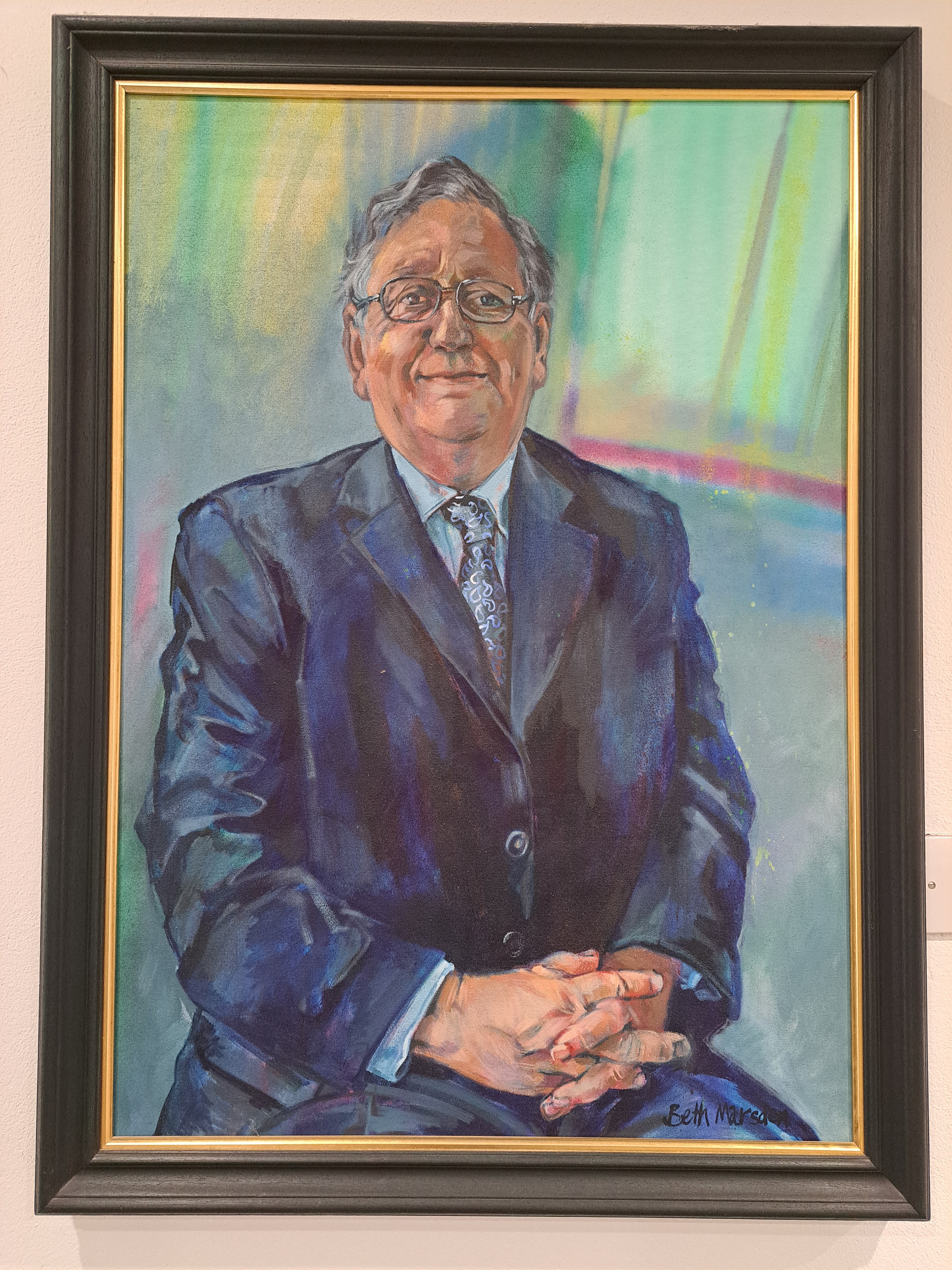
Portrait of Smith by Beth Marsden, 2005

A. David Smith FMedSci (b. 1938) spent his entire academic career in the University of Oxford. His research into biochemical changes with disease and prevention focuses on dementia. He co-founded the Oxford Project to Investigate Memory and Ageing (OPTIMA) which found mild cognitive impairment can be significantly reduced in over half of cases through treatment with homocysteine-lowering B vitamins in subjects with a good omega-3 fatty acids status. Smith co-founded the International Brain Research Organization's journal Neuroscience in 1976 and served as Chief Editor until 2001.

As well as Head of Department, Smith was appointed Founding Director of the MRC Anatomical Neuropharmacology Unit in 1985 which was associated with the Department of Pharmacology with Associate Director, Peter Somogyi FRS. In 1987 Smith negotiated an agreement with E.R. Squibb & Sons Inc., with a donation of £20 million to create a new larger purpose built building for the department and funding for research into brain diseases. Smith included a common room with a café as a communal space.

=== 2006 - 5th statutory chair ===
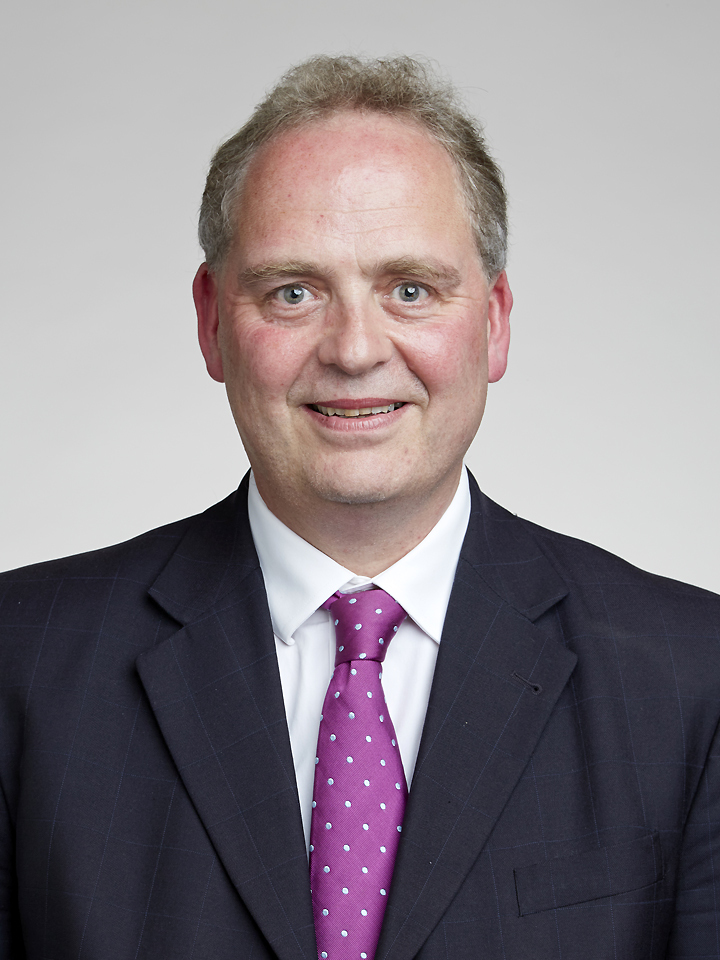
Antony Galione

Antony Galione FRS is the current holder of this position. Following a BA in Natural Science at Trinity College, University of Cambridge from 1989 he worked on the role of calcium oscillations in cell activation in Sir Michael Berridge's laboratory. After working in UCL on mammalian fertilisation with Michael Whitaker, he went to Johns Hopkins University as a Harkness Fellow studying the role of calcium signals in early development. In 1991 Galione joined the Department of Pharmacology. He was appointed Professor of Pharmacology in 2002, and elected to the Professorship of Pharmacology in 2006. He served as Head of the Department of Pharmacology from 2006-2015. Galione was elected a Fellow of the Academy of Medical Sciences in 2010 and a Fellow of The Royal Society in 2016 for his work which focuses on calcium signalling.

=== Scientists ===
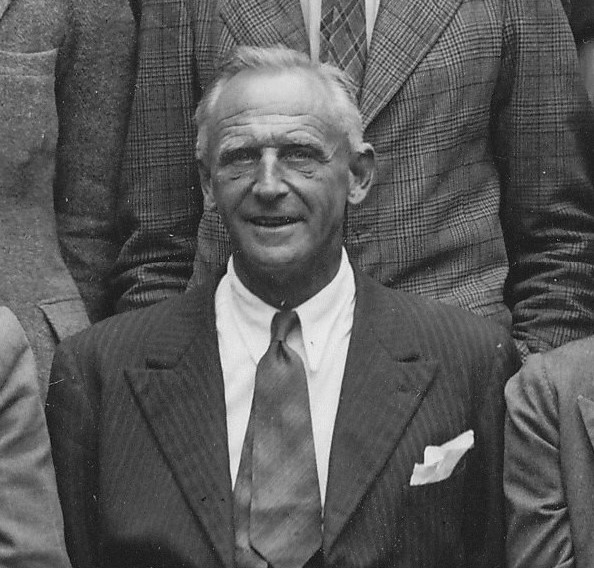
Heaton in 1945

- Trevor B. Heaton M.D. (1886–1972) – Demonstrator 1925–1944; Dr Lee's Reader in Anatomy at Christ Church College Oxford; wrote 'The Human Body' (1927) published by George G. Harrap & Co. Ltd.; research into Vitamin D, actions of pilocarpine and development of tissue culture.
- Reginald St. A. Heathcote FRCP (1888-1951) – Demonstrator 1920–1922 and research in collaboration with J.A. Gunn into effects of squill cobra venom, and the action of caffeine and theobromine on the heart; 1st Chair of Pharmacology, Cairo University in 1922; Professor of Pharmacology, in the University of Wales from 1933.
- Kenneth James Franklin FRS (1897–1966) – Following service in the Royal Artillery from 1915 he changed from classics to medicine from 1919-1922 at Hertford College in Oxford; Demonstrator 1924– 1938 with research into valves and veins in different species, and used techniques of cinematography and radiography to study circulation following visits to Dr Robert Ranker in Bonn in 1926 and 1934, and to M. Pierre Rijlant in Brussels.; study of medical history on circulation with physicians Richard Lower and translated the work of William Harvey
- Harry Raymond Ing FRS (1899–1974) – 1st chemist to hold a senior appointment in pharmacology as 'Lecturer in Pharmacological Chemistry' in UCL 1929-1938 under E.B Verney with appointment as1st Reader in this subject in 1937; Fellowship in Rockefeller Institute 1938-9; Newly created position of 'Reader in Pharmacological Chemistry' (later 'Reader in Chemical Pharmacology') in Oxford from 1939-1966 with research focusing on structure-action relationships of drugs including effects of quaternary ammonium salts on nerves, substitutes for atropine during wartime and on the neurotransmitter acetylcholine; he developed and ran a 'Chemical Pharmacology' course from 1945 which was the 1st of its kind in the UK; 1946 - founding of 'British Journal of Pharmacology and Chemotherapy' (renamed 'British Journal of Pharmacology') and first editor for 7 years.
- 'Hugh' Hermann Karl Felix Blaschko FRS (1900–1993) - Jewish exile from Germany in 1933 and son of dermatologist and venereologist Alfred Blaschko 1925–932 – worked in Berlin with Nobel Prize winner Otto Fritz Meyerhof; 1933 worked with Nobel Prize winner A.V. Hill OBE FRS in UCL who set up the Academic Assistance Council (Meyerhof had previously sent Blaschko to work with Hill from 1929–1930 with whom he shared the Nobel prize); 1934 worked with Sir Joseph Barcroft in Cambridge who asked him how is adrenaline destroyed.; 1944-1967 - Oxford including 'Reader in Biochemical Pharmacology'; 1989 – awarded 6th Wellcome Gold Medal with Wilhelm Feldberg Blaschko discovered how adrenaline is made in the body, stored in cells and how it is destroyed in the body. His research contributed to the development of drugs used in clinical medicine to treat diseases such as depression, hypertension, and Parkinson's Disease.
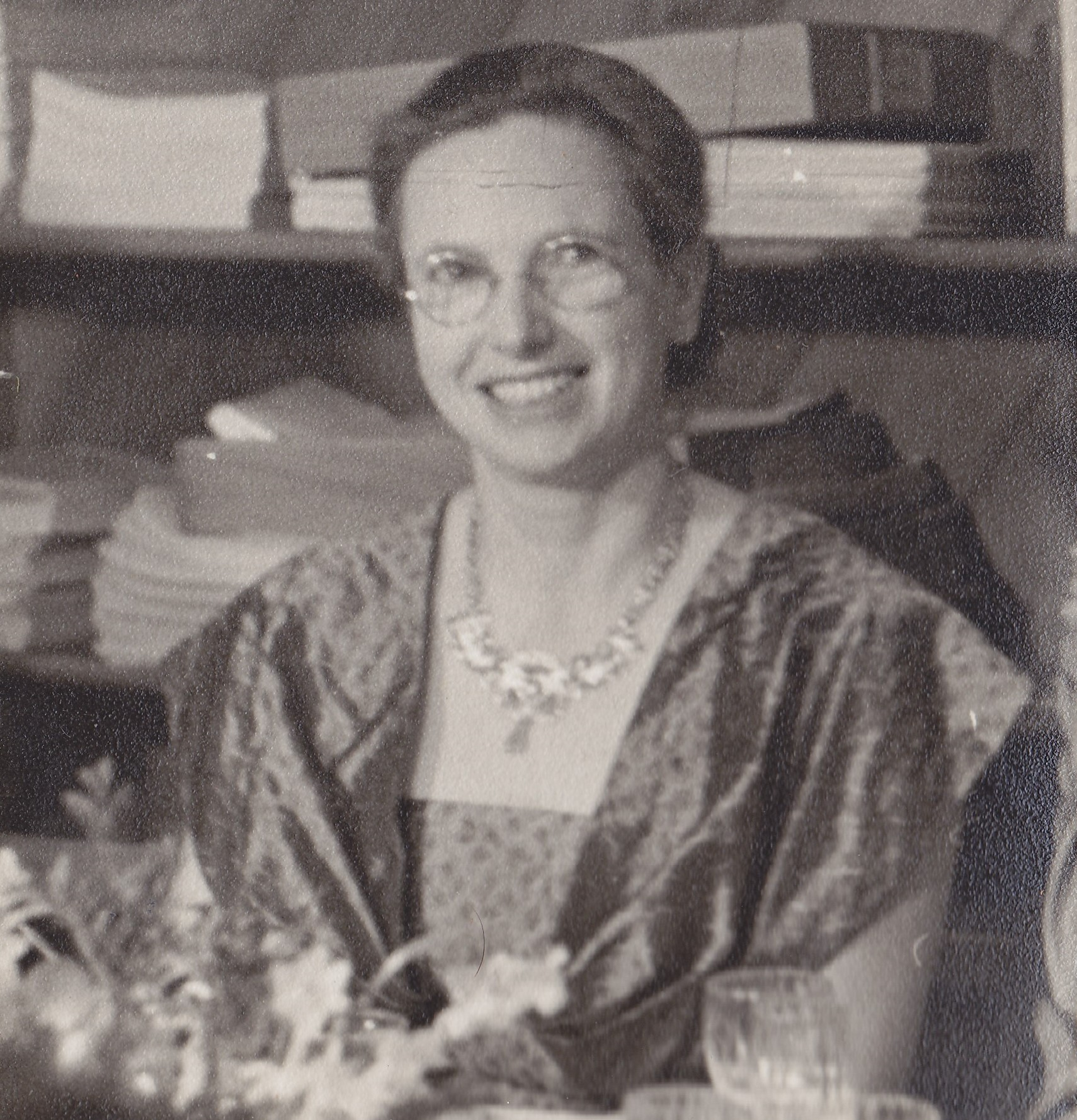
  Edith Bulbring in 1952
  Edith Bülbring FRS (1903-1990) – Jewish exile from Germany in 1933; 1928–1933 – working with Professor of Pharmacology, Paul Trendelberg in Berlin where she met Marthe Vogt; 1933-1937 worked with J.H. Burn at the Pharmaceutical Society, Bloomsbury Square on biological standardisation; 1937–1949 - Demonstrator in Oxford with J.H. Burn and research including into acetylcholine and adrenaline; 1949 – 8 months in Detlev Bronk's biophysics laboratory at John Hopkin's University; 1950-1971 – Oxford leading her own research group on physiology of smooth muscle involving around 40 scientists including Gustav Jacob Born, Alison Brading; 1958 – 14th elected woman Fellow of the Royal Society; 1967–1971 – Professorship.; 1985 - awarded 4th Wellcome Gold Medal Bülbring pioneered smooth muscle physiology.
- Geoffrey S. Dawes FRS (1918-1996) – Part-time Demonstrator 1944–1947; worked on military-related projects with J.H. Burn including treatment of gas gangrene and atropine substitutes for treating nerve gas exposure; 1946 - awarded a Rockefeller Travelling Fellowship for the Pharmacology Department in Harvard University; 1947 -awarded a Royal Society Foulerton Research Fellowship; 1948–1985 - appointed Director of the Nuffield Institute of Medical Research; focus on foetal physiology. Sir John Vane completed his D.Phil. in 1953 under supervision by Dawes.
- (Edward) Miles Vaughan Williams (1918-2016) – Part-time Demonstrator 1946–1983; previously studied classics in Wadham College and changed to medicine from 1942. including being taught in the Pharmacology Department from 1944; 1955 – first full-time science Fellow of Hertford College His research focused on physiology of the heart and prevention of life-threatening heart attacks through drugs. He became one of the first pharmacologists to work on actions of beta blockers. including propafenone and cibenzoline He developed the first widely used classification system for antidysrhythmic drugs, known as the Vaughan Williams classification.
- Gustav Victor Rudolf Born FRS (1921-2018) – Jewish exile from Germany in 1933; 1945 – worked in Mumbai which included visiting Hiroshima as a pathologist and observed radiation-induced damage to bone marrow resulting in bleeding through an inability to produce platelets;1953-1960 - Demonstrator in Oxford and contributed to practical classes and collaborate with Edith Bülbring on the physiology and pharmacology of smooth muscle, with Geoffrey S. Dawes on foetal circulation and with Blaschko into the relationship of serotonin and platelets. He became lifelong friends with Sir John Robert Vane; 1960–1973 – appointed Professor of Pharmacology, Royal College of Surgeons. Born made fundamental contributions to the study of platelets which paved the way for modern antiplatelet therapy. Born was awarded the 16th Wellcome Gold Medal.

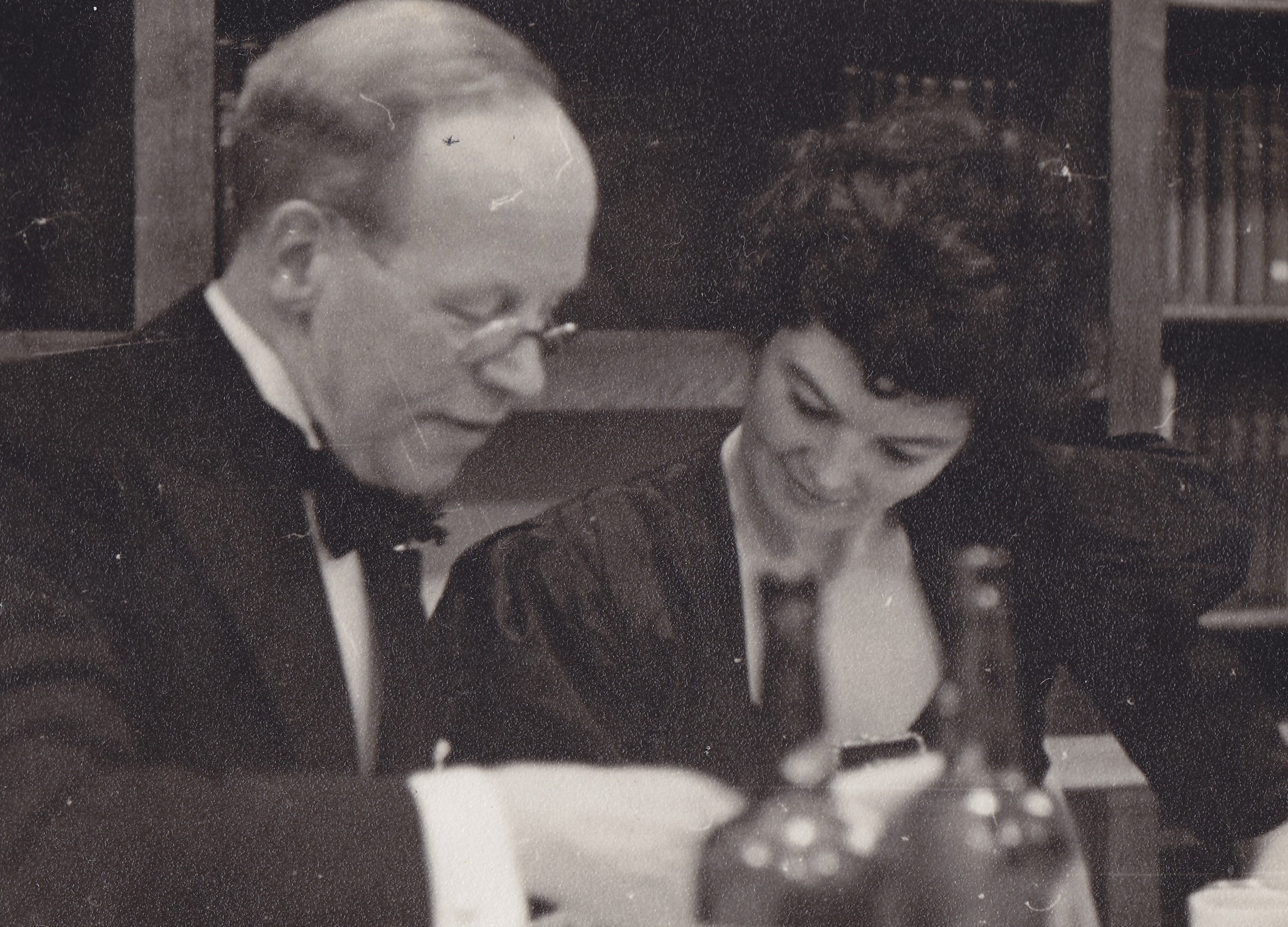
Pamela Holton (right) with JH Burn in 1952

- Pamela Margaret Holton (1923-1977) – 1946-1948 – research student with J.H. Burn working on standardisation of hormones affecting pancreatic secretion, on acetylcholine and noradrenaline, collaborated with chemist Ing and Blaschko; 1949–1955 – Physiological Laboratory in Cambridge; 1955–1977 – Lecturer at St Mary's Hospital Medical School with research into gastric blood flow.
- Oleh Hornykiewicz (1926-2020) - 1956-1958 – British Council scholarship to work with Blaschko on the cardiovascular effects of dopamine. He credited Blaschko for his advice to study dopamine; 1967-1992 - Emeritus Professor of Pharmacology, University of Toronto; first suggested a link between a lack of dopamine and onset of Parkinson's disease and played a key role in the development of L-dopa in managing the disorder.
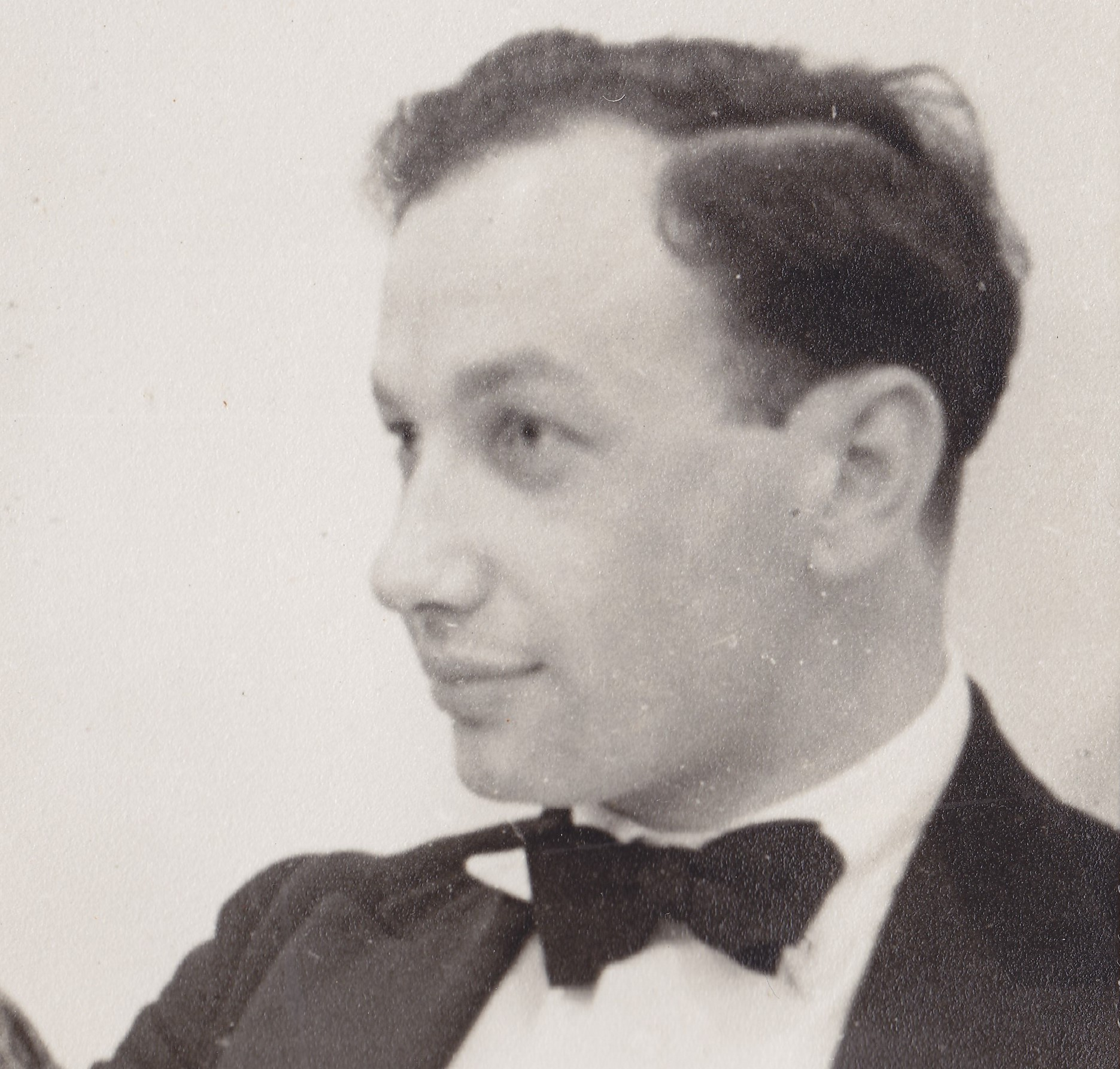
- Sir John Vane in 1952
  Sir John Robert Vane FRS (1927-2004); 1944 - chemistry degree at the University of Birmingham; 1946-1949 - student in pharmacology in Oxford under J.H. Burn with research into acetylcholine and paludrine; 1949-1953 – doctorate with Dawes in the Nuffield Institute; 1953-1955 – Assistant Professor under chairman Arnold D. Welch, Yale University; from 1955 – Senior Lecturer of Pharmacology, Institute of Basic Medical Sciences, Royal College of Surgeons working under Sir William Paton and Gustav Born. Vane's research was instrumental in understanding how aspirin produces pain-relief and anti-inflammatory effects which led to new treatments for heart disease and the introduction of ACE inhibitors. He was awarded the 9th Wellcome Gold Medal and the Nobel Prize in Physiology or Medicine in 1982 with Sune Bergström and Bengt Samuelsson for "their discoveries concerning prostaglandins and related biological substances".
- Geoffrey Burnstock FRS (1929-2020); 1957-1959 – postdoctoral research with Bülbring on the pharmacology of noradrenaline and acetylcholine in controlling smooth muscle; 1959 - Melbourne University, Australia where he introduced the idea that ATP may act as a co-transmitter (purinergic receptors as membrane receptors) which led to the development of important drugs, including clopidogrel, used as an anticoagulant in cardiovascular disease.
- Ranjit Roy Chaudhury (1930-2015) – 1955-1958 (Rhodes scholar) doctorate in Pharmacology with John M. Walker; led the National Committee for formulating the policy and guidelines on drugs and clinical trials in India and chairman of the joint programme of World Health Organization.
- Alison Brading (1939-2011) – after recovering from polio, gained a degree in zoology and PhD. in the University of Bristol; 1965-1968 - joined Edith Bülbring's research group focusing on smooth muscle; 1972-2005 - Fellow of Lady Margaret Hall;1972-1995 - Lecturer in Pharmacology; 1996 – Professor in Pharmacology. Her research focussed on smooth muscle which controls contraction of the bladder and urethra and the importance of K^{+} ion channels. This led to the study of drugs to help with incontinence. Brading led the Oxford Continence Group in collaboration with urology surgeons.
- Peter Somogyi FRS (born 1950) – 1977-1978 – Demonstrator in pharmacology in Oxford supervised by A. David Smith; 1978-1979 – Wellcome Trust Research Fellow; 1985–2015 - Associate, then Director of MRC Anatomical Neuropharmacology Unit, Department of Pharmacology, Oxford; research into how brain centres are organised structurally including cell types and locating signalling molecules in synapses which together he calls the 'chronocircuit' allowing rapid response to changes in the environment.
- Baroness Susan Greenfield (born 1950) – 1973–1977 - Doctorate and MRC Research Fellowship in pharmacology in Oxford supervised by A. David Smith on the origins of acetylcholinesterase in cerebrospinal fluid; 1977–1978 – J.H. Burn Trust Scholarship; 1985–1996 – Lecturer in Synaptic Pharmacology; 1996-2011 – Professor of Pharmacology; 2011-2013 – Senior Research Fellow; research into treatment of Alzheimer's Disease and Parkinson's Disease; co-founded biotech company Neuro-bio Ltd.; 1998 - 2001 Director of the Royal Institution; 2001 - member of the House of Lords.

=== Notable visitors ===
- Arnold D. Welch (1908–2003) – 1952–1953 – worked with Blaschko on storage of adrenaline in the adrenal gland, which led to an understanding of how several important drugs produce actions including reserpine used for treating high blood pressure and schizophrenia; 1953–1967 – established Department of Pharmacology, Yale University; president of the Squibb Institute for Medical Research, which resulted in the development of Captropril, the first of many ACE inhibitors; at the age of 75 years coordinator of the National Cooperative Discovery Groups of the National Cancer Institute.
- Dorothy Crowfoot Hodgkin FRS (1910–1994) – pioneered the use of crystallography to map the structures of penicillin, insulin, and vitamin B_{12}; 1947 – elected 5th woman Fellow to the Royal Society; 1962 - Hodgkin was offered space by Burn and later Paton in the basement of Pharmacology for a crystallography room which was adapted with funding from the Royal Society; 1964 – Hodgkin received the Nobel Prize in Chemistry and she remains Britain's only female Nobel Prize winner in science.
- Alan William Cuthbert FRS (1932-2016) – Edith Bülbring who invited him to undertake some sucrose gap experiments in her laboratory in Oxford. Whilst there Cuthbert met Arnold Burgen, a pharmacologist visiting from Canada, who became the second Sheild Professor at Cambridge in 1962. This contact with Burgen led Alan to apply for, and secure, a Demonstratorship in the Department of Pharmacology at the University of Cambridge in 1963; 1979 –1999 - Head of Department of Pharmacology, University of Cambridge. He carried out ground-breaking work on epithelial ion transport, and later on ion transport deficits that underlie cystic fibrosis. Cuthbert was awarded the 14th Wellcome Gold Medal.
- Leslie Iversen FRS (1937-2020) – Visiting Professor of Neuropharmacology 1995-2020; 1970–1983 - Director of MRC Neurochemical Pharmacology Unit, Cambridge; 1983–1995 – Founding Director of Merck, Sharp & Dohme Neuroscience Research Centre, Harlow. He made seminal discoveries including characterization of neurotransmitter uptake mechanisms, which paved the way for the development of a new class of drug in widespread use, the antidepressants. He pioneered the neuropeptide transmitter field, helping develop understanding of the mechanisms of neurotransmitter action. His work for the Science and Technology Committee of the House of Lords as a scientific advisor on a report on cannabis in 1998 led him to write about medicinal and drugs of abuse and later chaired the Advisory Council on the Misuse of Drugs at the Home Office. Iversen was awarded the 13th Wellcome Gold Medal.

=== Heads of department ===
- 1898 - 1908 – William John Smith Jerome
- 1912 - 1937 – James Andrew Gunn
- 1937 - 1959 – Joshua Harold Burn FRS
- 1959 - 1984 – Sir William Drummond Macdonald Paton FRS
- 1984 - 2000 – A. David Smith
- 2000 - 2005 – Edith Sim
- 2006 - 2015 – Antony Giuseppe Galione FRS
- 2015 - 2020 – Nigel Emptage
- 2020 - Frances Mary Platt FRS
