= Hugh Blaschko =

German biochemist and pharmacologist

- Hermann Karl Felix Blaschko
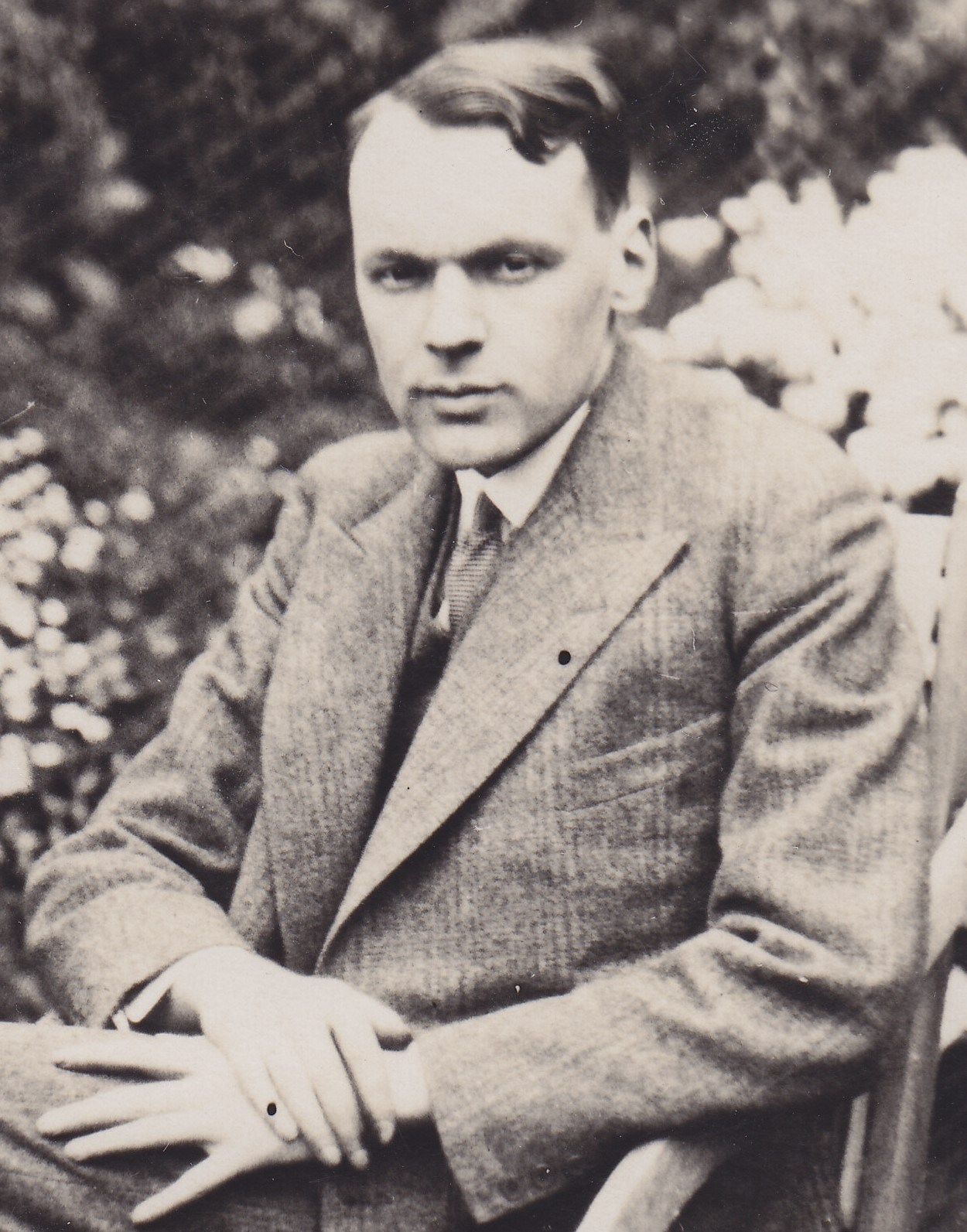
- Photograph taken of Hugh Blaschko by A.V. Hill in the UK in 1929 or 1930
- Born: 4 January 1900; Berlin, Germany
- Died: 18 April 1993 (93 years); Oxford, England
- Education: University of Berlin University of Freiburg
- Scientific career
- Workplaces: University of Göttingen, Kaiser Wilhelm Institute of Biology in Berlin, Kaiser Institute for Medical Research in Heidelberg, University College London, University of Cambridge, University of Oxford

Signature
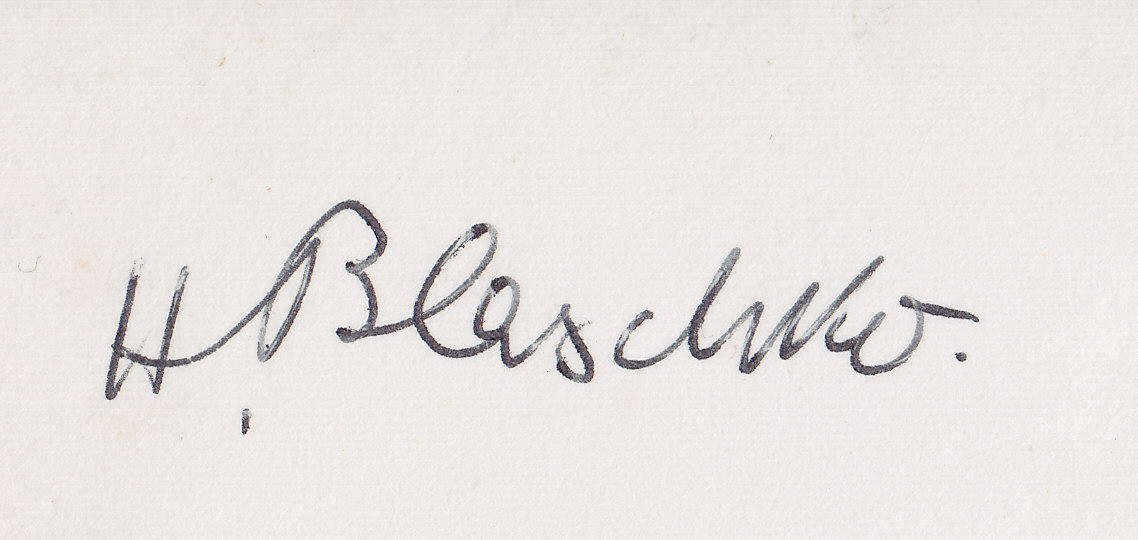

Hermann Karl Felix ‘Hugh’ Blaschko FRS (1900 – 1993) was a biochemist and pharmacologist. Blaschko came from a distinguished German family of doctors and became an exile in 1933 because he was Jewish and moved to the UK. Blaschko's research focused on elucidating the biosynthesis and metabolism of catecholamines, particularly adrenaline. His discoveries led to the development of the first effective drugs for controlling blood pressure and monoamine inhibitors as a class of antidepressants.

== Early life and education ==
Blaschko was born in Berlin into a German-Jewish family. His father, Alfred Blaschko, was an internationalist and distinguished dermatologist and venereologist who became an expert on histological stains and was deeply concerned about social issues in medicine. Hermann's mother, Johanna, was the daughter of a doctor. Blaschko was educated in the Royal Prinz-Heinrich-Gymnasium, Berlin. On leaving school in 1917 he worked as an apprentice in the laboratory of Nathan Zuntz at the Institute of Animal Physiology at the Agricultural Academy, Berlin. In the autumn of 1917 Blaschko started studying medicine in the Universities of Berlin and then Freiburg where he was taught by physiologist Johannes von Kries and he first met Hans Krebs as a fellow medical student.

== Early career ==
On the advice of Max Born he started work in the Medical Clinic of the University of Göttingen in 1923 where he was taught by Erich Meyer. In 1924 he moved to Davos to work with Adolph Loewy who was director of the Physiological Laboratory where he first attended a meeting of the German Pharmacological Society (DGPT). While in Göttingen, Professor of mathematics Richard Courant (a friend of Born) recommended Blaschko consider working for the biochemist and Nobel prize winner Otto Meyerhof at the Kaiser Wilhelm Institute for Biology in Berlin which Blaschko did from 1925. Whilst in Berlin Blaschko suffered his first episode of tuberculosis in 1926. In 1928 he became Assistant in Physiology at the University of Jena for a year. In 1929 Meyerhof invited Blaschko to join him with newly established Institute in Heidelberg University. While the building was being equipped and staffed between 1929 and 1930, Blaschko was sent to work with muscle physiologist, Archibald .V. Hill in University College London to whom Meyerhof shared the Nobel prize in physiology or medicine in 1922.

== Exile from Germany ==
From 1932 to 1933 Blaschko suffered from a second episode of tuberculosis for 9 months including time in a hospital in Freiburg. With the rise of the antisemitic Nazi regime, and despite being in convalescence, Blaschko decided to leave Germany in May 1933 with help from the Academic Assistance Council which A.V. Hill had helped set up. During Blaschko's first year in the UK while recovering from illness he spent most of his time assisting A.V. Hill on the Academic Assistance Council looking after German refugees.

== Career and research in the UK ==
In 1934 on the advice of A.V. Hill and H. Krebs, Blaschko moved to the University of Cambridge in 1934 to join physiologist, Sir Joseph Barcroft. In Cambridge Blaschko lived on a very modest grant from the Academic Assistance Council until 1936, followed by low income from demonstration and supervision. During this time, he became friends with German-Jewish exile and physiologist Wilhelm Feldberg.

In the autumn of 1943, Blaschko visited Oxford and met with the Professor of Pharmacology, J. H. Burn where he mentioned that he was applying for a job in New Zealand. Following his visit J.H. Burn offered Blaschko a permanent university post in the Department of Pharmacology in the University of Oxford from 1944 where he was appointed as a senior research officer and remained for the rest of his career. From 1944 to 1945 Blaschko suffered from a third episode of tuberculosis for 9 months. Burn provided a cohesive atmosphere in the department with daily lunches in the library and colleagues included another German-Jewish exile Edith Bülbring. Blaschko was given a spacious laboratory. He was joined by co-workers and students including Jean Himms, later Professor of Biochemistry in Ottawa, Karen Helle, later Professor of Physiology in Bergen, A. David Smith and Oleh Hornykiewicz. In 1965 Blaschko was appointed Reader in Biochemical Pharmacology until retirement in 1967.

== Research ==
Blaschko's research focused on the biosynthesis and breakdown of catecholamines which includes adrenaline and dopamine. His first major contribution was to answer Barcroft's question ‘How is adrenaline destroyed?’ which led to the discovery of an adrenaline-degrading enzyme, initially called adrenaline oxidase, later renamed monoamine oxidase. He initially believed the enzyme protected the body from poisonous amines in food but later it became apparent it contributes to breakdown of endogenous amines including catecholamines and serotonin. Monoamine inhibitors are important antidepressants today.

His second major contribution was on the clarification of the biosynthesis of catecholamines following the pathway of tyrosine to levodopa to dopamine and then probably to norepinephrine to adrenaline. Independently this pathway was discovered by Peter Holtz. The use of levodopa in Parkinson's disease and methyldopa in hypertension is based on interfering between the two substances in this synthesis pathway. Oleh Hornykiewicz who had worked with Blaschko, went on to discover that Parkinson's disease was due to dopamine deficiency in the brain which played a key role in the development of L-dopa as a therapy for the disorder.

Blaschko's third major contribution was the discovery that catecholamines of the adrenal medulla are not dissolved in the cytoplasm but packed into vesicles for release by exocytosis along with proteins and ATP.

Together with German pharmacologist, Erich Muscholl, Blaschko published the most thorough work of the 1970s on catecholamines.

== Honours (selection) ==
- 1962 – Elected a Fellow of the Royal Society
- 1963 – Purkinje Medal in Prague
- 1966 – Honorary degree, Free University of Berlin
- 1972 - Schmiedeberg Medal from the German Society for Experimental and Clinical Pharmacology and Toxicology (DGPT)
- 1974 – First Thudichum Medal of the Biochemical Society and the Wellcome Gold Medal of the British Pharmacological Society
- 1985 – Honorary degree, University of Bern

== Personal life ==
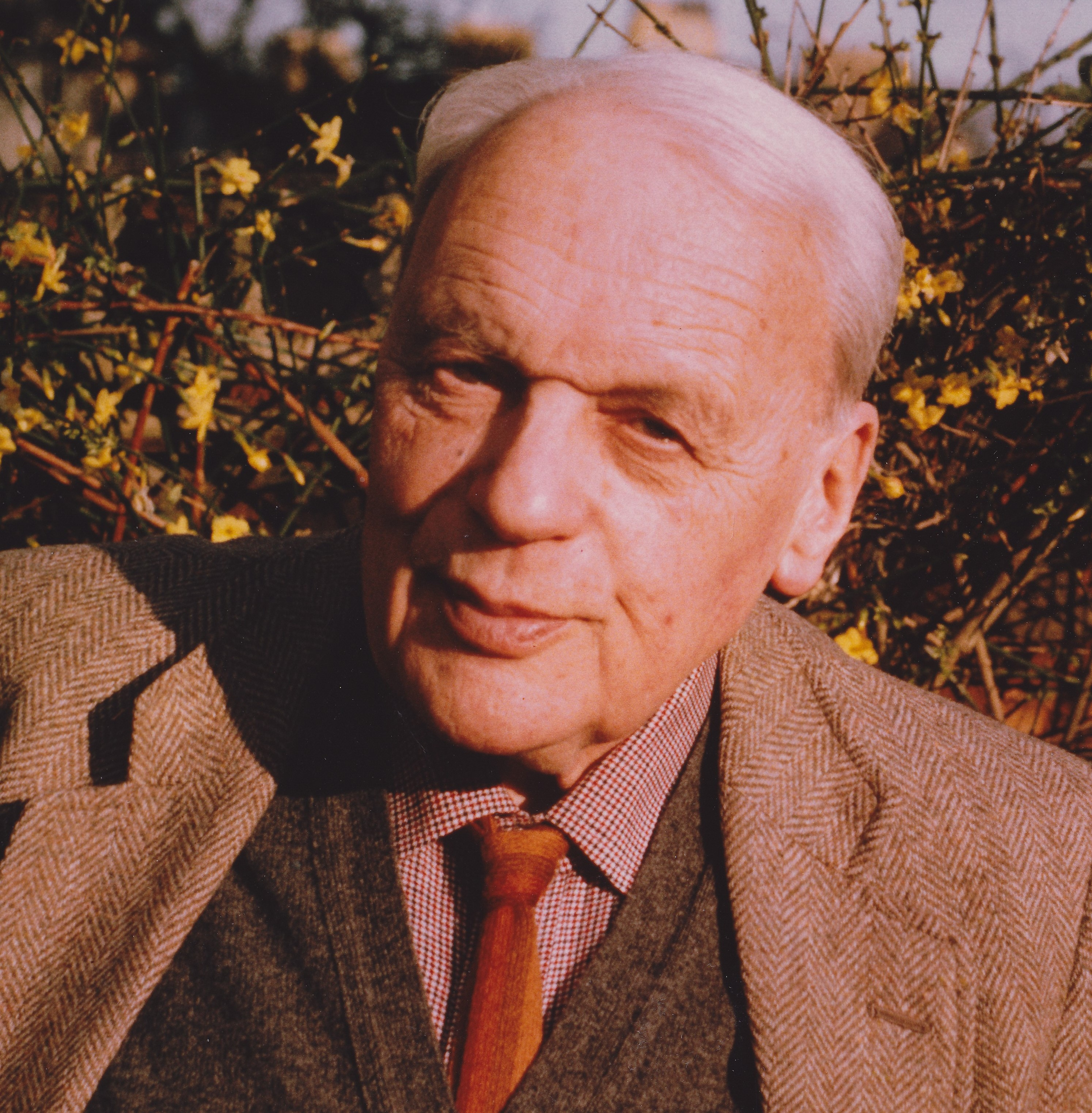
Hugh Blaschko at 90 years

While Hermann was his birth name, he gradually adopted ‘Hugh’ on moving to the UK and firmly after marrying Mary Black in Oxford in 1944. Blaschko retained life-long friends across the world which included Hans Krebs who he met while they were both students in 1922 in Freiburg. Krebs attended to him as his physician in 1932 when he was ill with tuberculosis. From 1933 Krebs became an exile as he was Jewish and he also moved to the UK. Krebs was awarded a Nobel prize for physiology or medicine for discovering the citric acid cycle in 1953. The following year Krebs was appointed Whitley Professor of Biochemistry, University of Oxford until retirement in 1967. Blaschko donated the Wellcome Gold Medal prize money to support young pharmacologists from abroad to come and do research in Oxford. His widow Mary endowed a fellowship in his name ‘Blaschko European Fellowship’ whose aim was to bring promising young scientists from Europe to the Department of Pharmacology.
