= William John Smith Jerome =

English physiologist (1839–1929)

William J. Smith Jerome
- Born: William John Smith; 1839
- Died: 1929
- Education: University College London; University of Oxford
- Scientific career
- Fields: Physiology; pharmacology
- Workplaces: Charing Cross Hospital; Royal Children's Hospital Melbourne; University of Oxford

William John Smith Jerome (1839-1929) was a physician, physiologist and pharmacologist who co-founded the Royal Children’s Hospital in Melbourne in 1870 and became the first pharmacology lecturer ("Lecturer on Medical Pharmacology and Materia Medica") in the University of Oxford in 1898.

== Early life and education ==
Smith was born in London, England in 1839. He took his mother’s maiden name of Jerome in 1894. His family residence was Basingstoke when he registered for his medical education in University College London in 1857. He received prizes and awards including gold medals in anatomy and physiology, materia medica and therapeutics, midwifery, surgery, medicine and the Atkinson-Morley surgical scholarship in 1862. He qualified in membership of the Royal College of Surgeons in 1861 and graduated in medicine (M.B. Lond.) in 1863. He received an M.A. in 1902 at New College, University of Oxford.

== Research and career ==
Smith studied and worked on the continent in Paris, Bonn, Freiburg, Marburg, Göttingen and Hanover. From 1868-69 he was appointed lecturer in Botany at Charing Cross Hospital.

In 1869, Smith traveled to Australia and registered with the medical board in Melbourne. In April 1870 Smith was appointed demonstrator in anatomy and curator of the Pathological Museum Melbourne (1870–71) working for George B. Halford, the University of Melbourne’s first Professor of anatomy, physiology and pathology. The university supplied jars and the hospital provided cases from where the Harry Brookes Allen Museum of Anatomy and Pathology developed.

In 1870, the Australian Medical Journal reported that "Dr. William Smith, Demonstrator of Anatomy at the University, commenced a hospital for children". The hospital Smith co-founded with Dr John Singleton became The Royal Children’s Hospital Melbourne. Smith resigned in 1871 and moved to a general practice in Casterton. In 1875, he returned to the continent and published five papers in Pflügers Archives including with Eduard Friedrich Wilhelm Pflüger in 1883 from the Physiological Laboratory, Bonn and from 1893 on biochemical components of urine as indicators of physiology from the Chemical Laboratories of Karl Arnold in the Royal Veterinary College, Hanover.

In 1897, Smith Jerome published a paper from the medical department in the University of Oxford on the formation of uric acid influenced by diet. In the same year the Regius Professor of Medicine, Sir Burdon-Sanderson, announced the appointment of Smith Jerome from 1898-99 as Lecturer on Medical Pharmacology and Materia Medica. In 1898 Smith Jerome published research from ‘the Pharmacological Department, Oxford’. He gave a public lecture in the Oxford University Museum of Natural History on "Pharmacology: its aims and methods", which was published in The Lancet. In 1899 Smith Jerome published papers on analysis of urine with a focus on uric acid in the Journal of Physiology and The Lancet in 1905. He was elected a member of the Physiological Society in 1900 and taught pharmacology in the University of Oxford from 1898-1908.

An article on medical teaching in the University of Oxford in the British Medical Journal in 1906 included: "pharmacology is excellently taught at Oxford, but it is only right to say that the credit for this belongs not to the University, but to the lecturer, Dr. Smith Jerome, in his teaching capacity, presents the picture, said by the ancients to be pleasing to the gods, of a good man struggling with adversity. He is an enthusiast who devotes himself to teaching as a labour of love. He lectures, prepares solutions, makes the arrangements for experiments and directs the practical work of his students in a sort of out-house in the Museum ground which is little better than a shed. For nine years he has done all this for a pittance which does not cover the expenses of his department. His only assistant is a boy who does little more than sweep out the rooms." While other departments had received donations, without adequate provision for the Department of Pharmacology Smith Jerome resigned in 1908. In 1912, his position was succeeded by J.A. Gunn who was given the title of Reader, later Professor, in Pharmacology.

After Oxford, Smith Jerome lived in Sestri Ponente, Italy. In 1924 he published a paper on the physiological action of an Italian method for treating respiratory infections through salt inhalation. While in his eighties, he wrote in the Section of Therapeutics and Pharmacology in the Journal of the Royal Society of Medicine on ‘The Unknown Factors of Gout’. in 1925.
