= Bulbring =

Bulbring or Bülbring is a surname. Notable people with the surname include:

- David Bulbring (born 1989), South African rugby player
- Edith Bülbring (1903–1990), British physiologist
