= Antony Galione =

British pharmacologist (born 1963)

Antony Galione FRS FMedSci
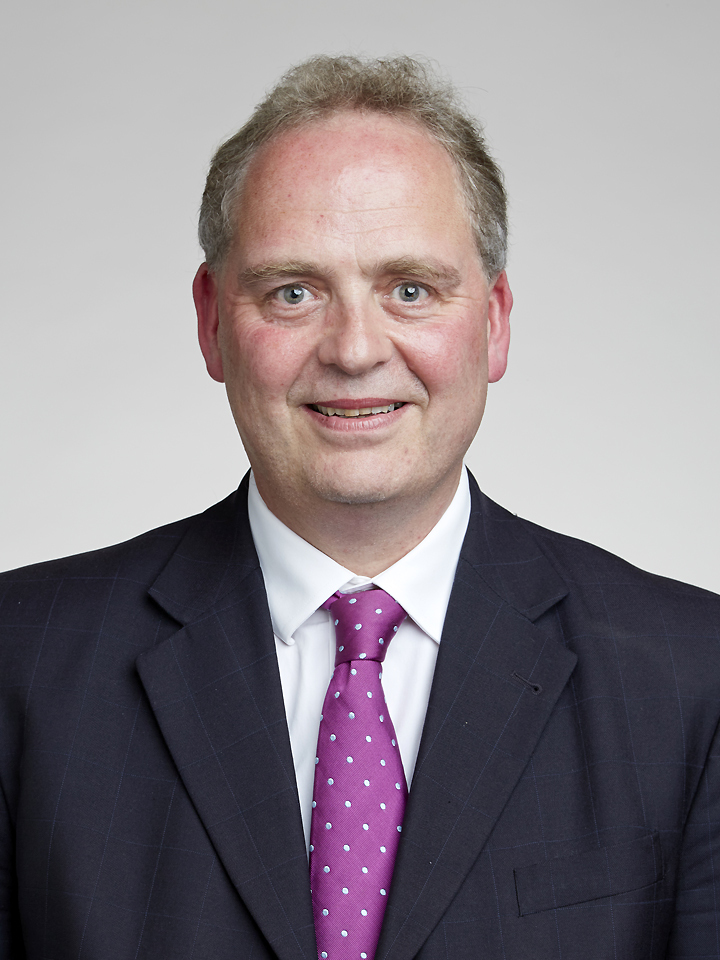
- Galione in 2016
- Born: 13 September 1963 (age 63); Chelmsford, England
- Education: Felsted School; Trinity College, Cambridge
- Spouse: Angela Clayton (m. 1992)
- Awards: Novartis Prize (2001)
- Scientific career
- Fields: Pharmacology; Calcium signalling
- Workplaces: University College London; Johns Hopkins University
- Thesis: Oscillations in intracellular calcium in the blowfly salivary gland (1989)
- Doctoral advisor: Michael Berridge
- Website: pharm.ox.ac.uk/team/antony-galione

Antony Giuseppe Galione (born 13 September 1963) is a British pharmacologist. He is a professor and Wellcome Trust senior investigator in the Department of Pharmacology at the University of Oxford.

== Early life and education ==
Antony Giuseppe Galione was born on 13 September 1963 in Chelmsford, England, to Angelo and Margaret Galione. He was educated at Felsted School in Essex and Trinity College, Cambridge, where he was awarded a Bachelor of Arts degree in Natural Sciences (Pharmacology) in 1985 followed by a PhD in 1989 for research on calcium signalling in the salivary gland of the blowfly, supervised by Michael Berridge.

== Research and career ==
Galione's research investigates calcium signalling. HC Lee established the concept of multiple calcium mobilising messengers which link cell surface stimuli to release of internal calcium stores, while Zhu, Evans and co-workers identified their target two-pore channels (TPCs) and organelles. This has enhanced our understanding of how calcium as a ubiquitous cellular regulator may control a myriad of cellular processes with precision.

Galione established that cyclic ADP-ribose regulates calcium-induced calcium release and globalisation of calcium signals, and that Nicotinic acid adenine dinucleotide phosphate (NAADP) is a ubiquitous trigger for initiating and co-ordinating calcium signals, often involving communication between organelles at contact sites.

By developing novel pharmacological, molecular and physiological approaches, he has demonstrated that these messengers and their targets regulate many fundamental pathophysiological cellular processes as diverse as Ebola virus disease infection, fertilisation and embryology, cardiac contractility, T cell activation and neuronal excitability. The discovery of lysosomes as calcium stores mobilised by NAADP has identified an entirely new signalling role for these organelles in health and disease.

Galione served as head of the Department of Pharmacology at the University of Oxford from 2006 until 2015.

=== Awards and honours ===
Galione was elected a Fellow of the Academy of Medical Sciences (FMedSci) in 2010 a Fellow of the Royal Society (FRS) in 2016. He was awarded the Novartis Prize from the British Pharmacological Society in 2001.
