= Frances Platt =

British biochemist

Frances (Fran) Platt FMedSci FRS MAE
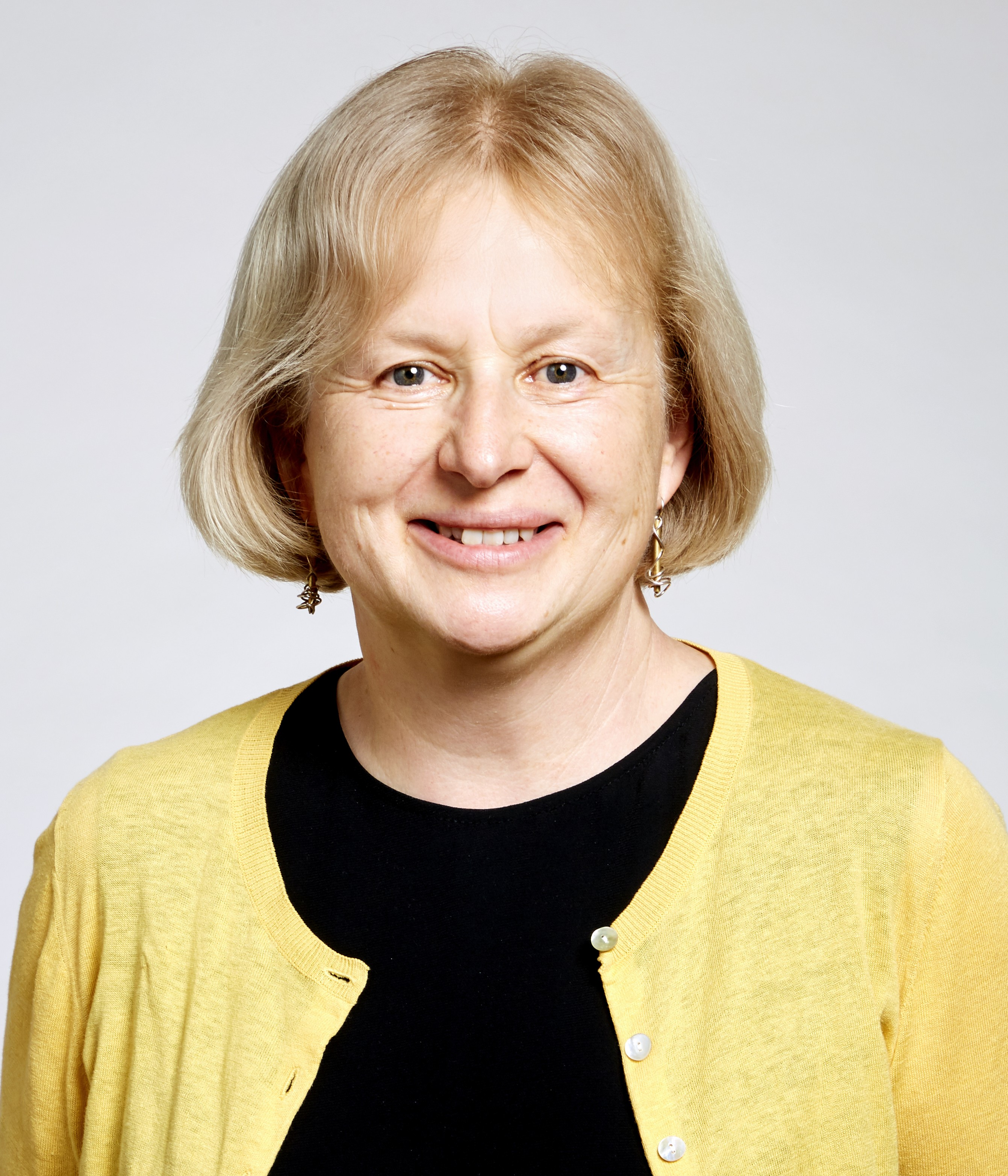
- Portrait of Platt at the Royal Society
- Education: Imperial College London; University of Bath
- Scientific career
- Fields: Pharmacology; Lysosomal storage diseases
- Workplaces: Washington University School of Medicine; University of Oxford
- Website: plattlab.nsms.ox.ac.uk

Frances Mary Platt (née Judson) FMedSci FRS MAE is a biologist whose research has focused on biochemistry and pharmacology Her research investigates rare genetic disorders known as lysosomal storage diseases, which are progressive conditions that typically lead to neurodegeneration. She is a Professor at the University of Oxford and currently Head of the Department of Pharmacology. She was elected Fellow of the Academy of Medical Sciences in 2011, and Fellow of the Royal Society in 2021.

== Early life and education ==
Platt was born in Shipley, West Yorkshire. Since childhood she has had a strong interest in science and the natural world and took a degree in zoology at Imperial College London. Platt went to the University of Bath for a PhD studying insect endocrinology.

== Research and career ==
In 1986, Platt moved to the US as a postdoctoral researcher at Washington University School of Medicine, where she investigated cell surface molecules on B cells in germinal centres. In 1987 the head of the research team, Joseph Davie MD PhD moved to the pharmaceutical arm of Monsanto (GD Searle), where Platt learnt about industrial research and started working on antiviral drugs.

In 1989 she moved back to the UK as a Senior Research Fellow in the Glycobiology Institute, Department of Biochemistry in the University of Oxford. In 1996 Platt was the recipient of a five-year Lister Institute Senior Research Fellowship. In 2008 she became Professor of Biochemistry and Pharmacology in the Department of Pharmacology and Head of the department in 2020.

Platt researches genetic disorders known as lysosomal storage diseases. The lysosome is an organelle within cells that is involved with breaking down large molecules. When it goes wrong, molecules accumulate in the lysosome resulting in lysosomal storage diseases.

Her expertise relates to glycosphingolipids (GSL) and glycosphingolipid lysosomal storage diseases. Together with her colleagues Terry Butters and Raymond Dwek, Platt pioneered a novel approach to treat these genetic disorders that has led to the development of an approved drug (miglustat) for type 1 Gaucher disease and Niemann-Pick disease type C disease. She is an academic co-founder of the company IntraBio and her translational work has continued as the companies lead drug Aqneursa was FDA approved in September 2024 for the treatment of Niemann-Pick disease type C. Currently her research focuses on the pathophysiology and treatment of lysosomal storage diseases and their links to Parkinson's disease.

=== Awards and honours ===
- 1998 Gaucher Association Alan Gordon award
- 1999 Horst-Bickel Award
- 2011 Elected Fellow of the Academy of Medical Sciences
- 2013 Royal Society Wolfson Merit Award
- 2016 Wellcome Trust Investigator
- 2018 Elected a Member of the Academia Europaea (MAE)
- 2021 Elected Fellow of the Royal Society

=== Selected publications ===
- First paper identifying the drug NB-DNJ (miglustat) as a glycosphingolipid biosynthesis inhibitor - F.M. Platt, G.R. Neises, R.A. Dwek, and T.D. Butters (1994) N-butyldeoxynojirimycin is a novel inhibitor of glycolipid biosynthesis J. Biol. Chem. 269, 8362–8365. https://pubmed.ncbi.nlm.nih.gov/8132559/
- First study to show that miglustat crosses the blood-brain barrier and can reduce glycosphingolipid storage in the brain - Platt, F. M., Neises, G.R., Reinkensmeier, G., Townsend, M.J., Perry, V.H., Proia, R.L., Winchester, B., Dwek, R.A. and Butters, T.D. (1997) Prevention of lysosomal storage in Tay-Sachs mice treated with N-butyldeoxynojirimycin. Science, 276, 428–431. https://doi.org/10.1126/science.276.5311.428
- Study reporting the pivotal clinical trial of miglustat in patients with type 1 Gaucher disease and demonstrated efficacy. This study led to approval of miglustat by the EMA and FDA in 2002/3 - T.M., Lachmann, R.H., Hollak, C.E.M., Aerts, J.M.F.G., van Weely, S., Hrebicek, M., Platt, F.M., Butters, T.D., Dwek, R.A., Moyses, C., Gow, I.R., Elstein, D. and Zimran, A. (2000) Novel oral treatment of Gaucher's disease with N-butyldeoxynojirmicin (OGT 918) to decrease substrate biosynthesis Lancet. 355, 1481–1485. https://doi.org/10.1016/s0140-6736(00)02161-9
- A pivotal study showing that activation of the innate immune system is a common hallmark of lysosomal disorders of the brain and a new therapeutic target - Jeyakumar, M., Thomas, R., Eliott-Smith, E., van der Spoel, A., d’Azzo, A., Perry, V.H., Butters, T.D., Dwek, RA. and Platt, F.M. (2003) Central nervous system inflammation is a hallmark of pathogenesis in mouse models of GM1 and GM2 gangliosidosis. Brain, 126, 974–987. https://doi.org/10.1093/brain/awg089
