= A. David Smith =

British pharmacologist

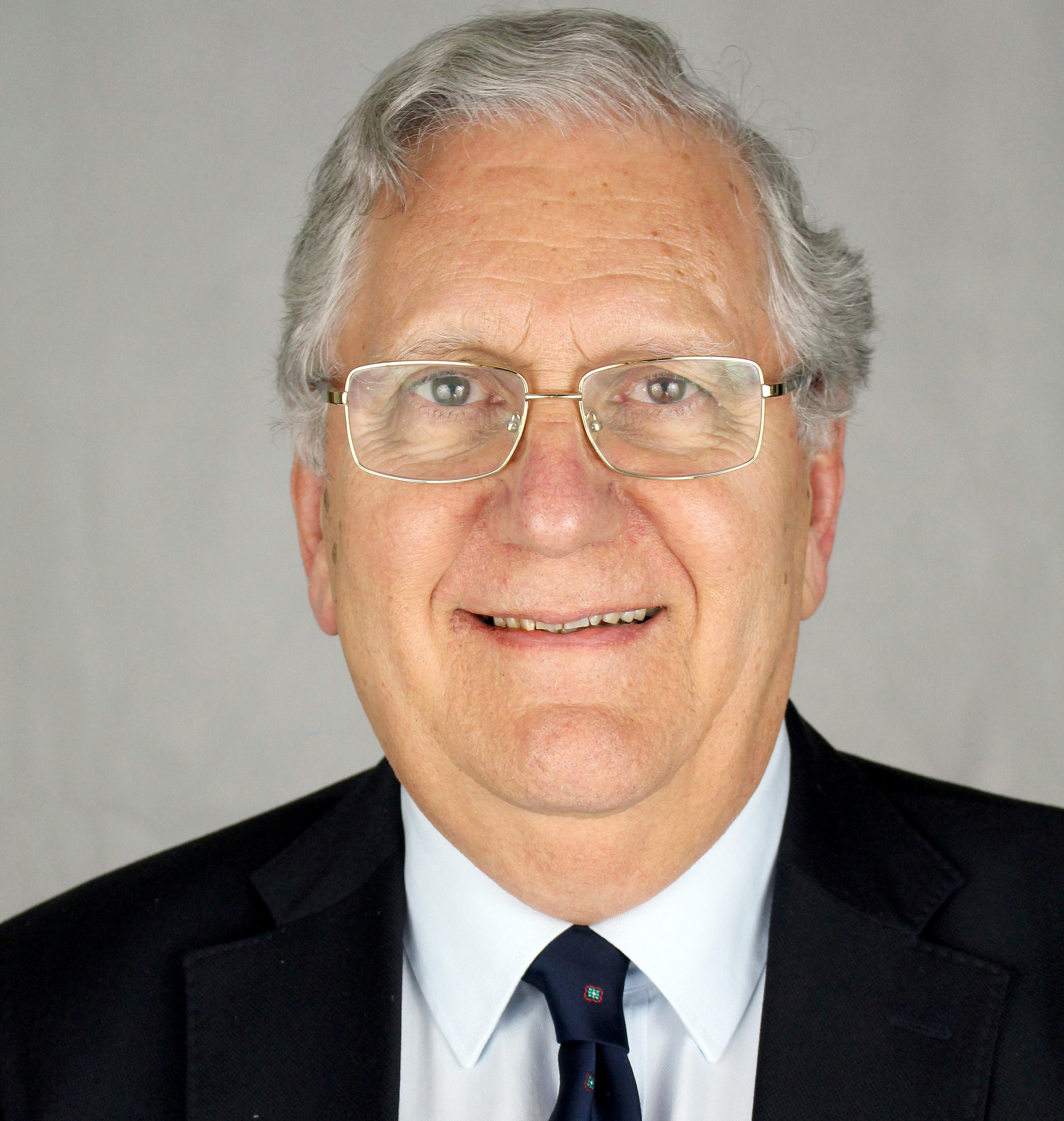
- Born: 16 September 1938 (age 88)
- Education: University of Oxford
- Known for: Identifying factors contributing to the development of dementia
- Scientific career
- Fields: Pharmacology, Neuroscience, Neuropharmacology
- Website: www.pharm.ox.ac.uk/team/a-david-smith

Anthony David Smith FMedSci (born 16 September 1938) is a British biochemist and pharmacologist. Smith has spent his entire academic career in the University of Oxford. His research focuses on biochemical changes with disease and prevention. This includes co-founding the Oxford Project to Investigate Memory and Ageing (OPTIMA). He is one of the leaders of international research to find ways to prevent dementia. He is also known for his work on the anatomical neuropharmacology of the basal ganglia.

== Early life and education ==
Smith was born in Kunming, China (missionary parents) and educated in Kingswood School, Bath. After 2 years as a technician at the MRC Radiobiological Research Unit, Harwell he became an undergraduate at Christ Church, University of Oxford where he graduated with a first-class honours degree in Biochemistry in 1963. He then joined the Department of Pharmacology in Oxford and gained a D.Phil. in 1966. His doctoral research investigated the secretion of chemicals from the adrenal gland.

== Research and career ==
After serving as Royal Society Stothert Research Fellow (1967–70), Smith was appointed University Lecturer in Pharmacology and Student (Fellow) of Christ Church in 1971. He was awarded the Gaddum Memorial Prize in 1978 for his discoveries on the release of noradrenaline through exocytosis. In 1979 Smith introduced an antenatal acetylcholinesterase test for spina bifida in early pregnancy which has been used around the world.

In 1984, David Smith was elected the fourth Statutory Chair of Pharmacology in the University of Oxford, and Head of the Department of Pharmacology until 2005. In the same year, he was elected a Fellow of Lady Margaret Hall in Oxford where he remains an Emeritus Fellow.

David Smith co-founded the International Brain Research Organization's journal Neuroscience and he served as Chief Editor from 1976 to 2001.

In 1985 Smith was appointed Founding Director of the MRC Anatomical Neuropharmacology Unit, Oxford which was associated with the Department of Pharmacology with associate director, Peter Somogyi FRS.

In 1987 David Smith negotiated an agreement with E.R. Squibb & Sons Inc., which led to the donation of £20 million to the University of Oxford for a new building for the Department of Pharmacology and funding for research into brain diseases.

In 1988 Smith co-founded the Oxford Project to Investigate Memory and Ageing (OPTIMA), a longitudinal clinico-pathological study on more than 1,000 people to identify modifiable risk factors contributing to dementia, which continued until 2015.

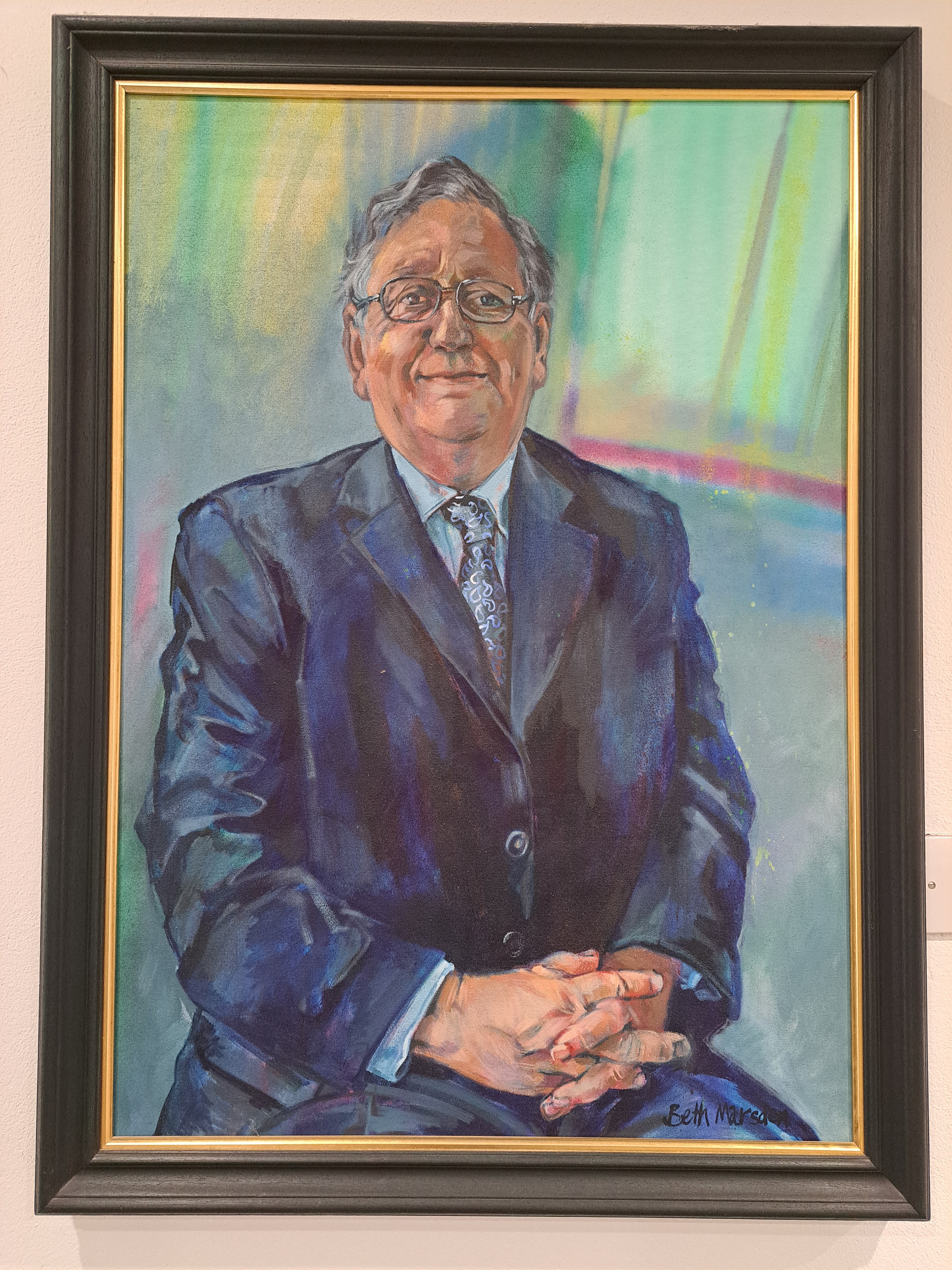
Portrait of A. David Smith (2005) by Beth Marsden

In 1998, OPTIMA discovered that elevated homocysteine and low levels of B vitamins are important risk factors for the development of Alzheimer's and vascular dementia. This finding led to the VITACOG clinical trial to investigate whether lowering plasma homocysteine concentrations through high doses of supplementary B vitamins (folic acid, vitamins B6 and B12) over two years could slow the rate of losing brain tissue in elderly subjects with mild cognitive impairment, a precursor of dementia. The results showed that the accelerated rate of brain atrophy in elderly with mild cognitive impairment can be significantly reduced in over half of cases through treatment with homocysteine-lowering B vitamins in subjects with a good omega-3 fatty acids status. In the same subjects, cognitive decline was slowed.

In 2000, Smith was appointed Deputy-Head (Vice-Dean) for 5 years to the newly established Medical Sciences Division in the University of Oxford. In the same year he was elected Fellow of the Academy of Medical Sciences UK.

From 1997 to 2002 Smith was the first Chair of the Scientific Advisory Board of Alzheimer's Research UK. In 2006, Alzheimer's Research UK appointed David Smith as their first Honorary Research Fellow. The David Smith Lectures in Anatomical Neuropharmacology were established in 2008 as part of the 25th anniversary of the MRC Anatomical Neuropharmacology Unit. A portrait of David Smith by Beth Marsden (2005) hangs in the entrance lobby of the Department of Pharmacology.

== Awards and honours ==
- 1960 Bostock Exhibition, Christ Church
- 1978 Seventh Gaddum Memorial Prize, British Pharmacological Society
- 1993 Honorary Doctorate (D.Sc.), University of Szeged, Hungary
- 1996 Foreign Member of Norwegian Academy of Science and Letters
- 1998 Honorary Doctor of Medicine (MD), Lund University, Sweden
- 1998 Honorary Member of the Hungarian Academy of Science
- 1999 Member of the Dana Alliance for the Brain USA
- 2000 Fellow of the Academy of Medical Sciences UK
- 2001 'Highly cited' researcher (in top 250 world-wide in neuroscience), Institute for Scientific Information, Philadelphia
- 2006 First Honorary Fellow of the Alzheimer's Research Trust, UK
- 2022 Hall of Fame, International Society of Orthomolecular Medicine

== Selected publications (from over 400) ==
- 1959 Smith, A.D., Ashwood-Smith, M. J.; Lowman, D. Radioprotective action of methoxamine. Nature 1959: 184, 1729-1730.
- 1967 Schneider, F.H., Smith. A.D .and Winkler H. Secretion from the adrenal medulla: biochemical evidence for exocytosis. Brit. J. Pharmac. Chemother., 31; 94-104
- Blaschko, H., Comline, R. S., Schneider, F. H., Silver, M., Smith, A. D. Secretion of a chromaffin granule protein, chromogranin, from the adrenal gland after splanchnic stimulation. Nature 1967: 215, 58-59.
- 1971 Smith, A. D. Secretion of proteins (chromogranin A and dopamine beta-hydroxylase) from a sympathetic neuron. Phil. Trans. Roy. Soc. Lond. B 1971: 261, 363-371.
- Smith, A.D. Some implications of the neuron as a secreting cell. Phil. Trans. Roy. Soc. Lond. B, 261;423-37.
- 1976 Chubb, I. W.; Goodman, S.; Smith, A. D. Is acetylcholinesterase secreted from central neurons into cerebrospinal fluid? Neuroscience 1, 57-62.
- 1979 Smith, A.D, Wald, N.J, H S Cuckle, H.S., Stirrat,G.M., M Bobrow, M. and H Lagercrantz, H. Amniotic-fluid acetylcholinesterase as a possible diagnostic test for neural-tube defects in early pregnancy. Lancet 313: 685-688.
- Somogyi, P., Hodgson, A. J., Smith, A. D. An approach to tracing neuron networks in the cerebral cortex and basal ganglia. Combination of Golgi staining, retrograde transport of horseradish peroxidase and anterograde degeneration of synaptic boutons in the same material. Neuroscience 4, 1805-1852.
- 1990 Smith, A. D. and Bolam, J. P. The neural network of the basal ganglia as revealed by the study of synaptic connections of identified neurons. Trends Neurosci.13, 259-265.
- 1992 Jobst, K. A., Smith, A. D, Szatmari, M., Molyneux, A., Esiri, M. M., King, E., Smith, A., Jaskowski, A., McDonald, B., Wald, N. Detection in life of confirmed Alzheimer's disease using a simple measurement of medial temporal lobe atrophy by computed tomography. Lancet 340, 1179-1183.
- 2010 Smith AD, Smith SM, de Jager CA, Whitbread P, Johnston C, Agacinski G, Oulhaj A, Bradley KM, Jacoby R, Refsum H. (2010) Homocysteine-lowering by B vitamins slows the rate of accelerated brain atrophy in mild cognitive impairment: a randomized controlled trial. PLoS One. 5(9): e12244.
- 2013 Douaud G., Refsum, H., de Jager, C.A., Jacoby, R., Nichols, T.E., Smith, S.M., Smith, A.D. Preventing Alzheimer's disease-related gray matter atrophy by B-vitamin treatment. Proc Natl Acad Sci U S A, 110, 9523 – 9528.
- 2014 Smith, A.D. and Yaffe K. Dementia (including Alzheimer's disease) can be prevented: statement supported by international experts. J Alzheimers Dis, 38, 699 - 703.
- 2016 Smith, A.D and Refsum H. Homocysteine, B Vitamins, and Cognitive Impairment. Annu Rev Nutr, 36, 211 – 239
- 2017 Smith, A.D. and Refsum H. Dementia Prevention by Disease-Modification through Nutrition. J Prev Alzheimers Dis, 4, 138 – 139
- 2018 Smith, A.D., Refsum, H., Bottiglieri T., Fenech, M., Hooshmand, B., McCaddon, A., Miller, J.W., Rosenberg, I.H. and Obeid, R. Homocysteine and Dementia: An International Consensus Statement. J Alzheimers Dis, 62, 561 – 570.
- Smith A.D., Warren M.J. and Refsum, H. Vitamin B12. Adv Food Nutr Res. 83: 215-279.
- 2021 Smith A.D. and Refsum, H. Homocysteine – from disease biomarker to disease prevention. J. Intern. Med. 290; 826-854
- 2023 Grande G.,Hooshmand B., Vetrano D.L.,Smith D. A., Refsum H.,Fratiglioni L., Ljungman, P., Wu J., Bellavia A., Eneroth K., Bellander T. and Rizzuto D. Association of long-term exposure to air pollution and dementia risk: The role of homocysteine, methionine, and cardiovascular burden. Neurology; 101, 12, e1231-e1240.
- Zhang, Y., Chen S.D., Deng Y. T., You J., He X.Y., Wu X.R., Wu B.S., Yang L., Zhang Y.R., Kuo K., Feng J.F., Cheng W., Suckling J., Smith A.D. and Yu J.T. Identifying modifiable factors and their joint effect on dementia risk in the UK biobank. Nat Hum Behav 7, 1185-1195.

== Personal life ==
Smith has two sons and one daughter. He is interested in music and art. In 1981 he and his wife organised the first visit of the Berlin Philharmonic Orchestra to Oxford for a concert with Herbert von Karajan in the Sheldonian Theatre, broadcast by the BBC. Since 2022, Smith has written reviews on art history including on Scandinavian artists. Smith lives in Sweden.
