= Alfred Blaschko =

German dermatologist (1858–1922)

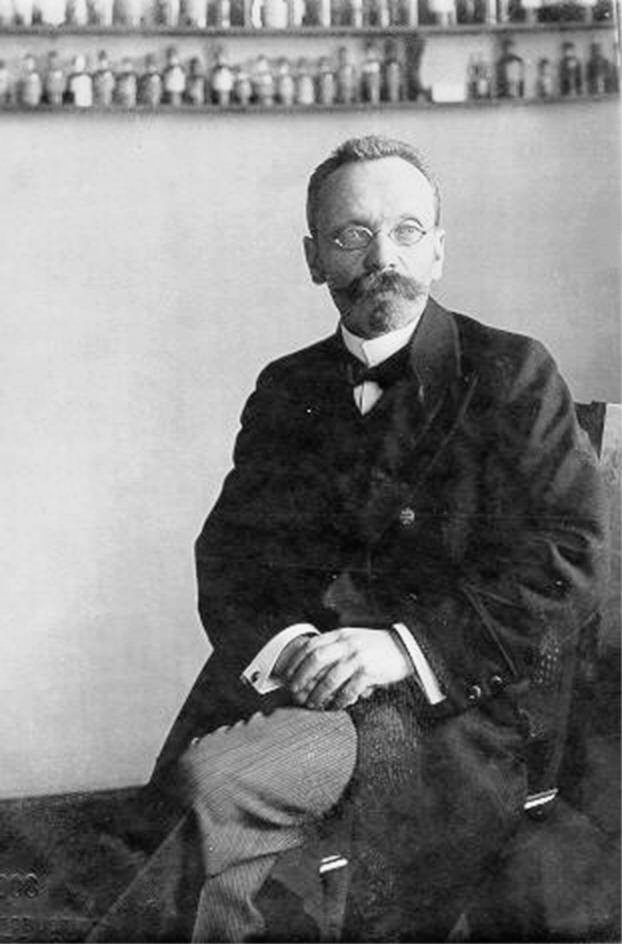
- Born: 4 March 1858
- Died: 26 March 1922 (aged 63)

Alfred Blaschko (4 March 1858 – 26 March 1922) was a German dermatologist who was a native of Freienwalde an der Oder.

In 1881 he earned his medical doctorate at Berlin, and afterwards worked with Georg Wegner (1843–1917) in Stettin. Later he opened a private dermatological practice in Berlin.

Blaschko specialized in the study of occupational dermatoses and prophylaxis of venereal disease. He performed studies of prostitution and examined the sanitary conditions in this profession. In 1902 with Albert Neisser he co-founded the Deutsche Gesellschaft zur Bekämpfung der Geschlechtskrankheiten (German Society for the Fight against Venereal Diseases) in Berlin.

In 1901 at the Seventh Congress of the German Dermatological Society held in Breslau, Blaschko presented his observations of a rare dermatological condition. It involved patterned skin lesions that were S-shaped on the abdomen, V-shaped over the upper spinal region with an inverted U-shape from the breast onto the upper arm. Blaschko had based his findings on examinations of over 140 patients with nevoid and acquired linear skin diseases. This unusual patterned condition was later referred to as "lines of Blaschko". Although he proposed an embryonic origin for this phenomenon, he did not provide further detail in this regard.

In 1913 Blaschko gave a lecture on 'Syphilis: it's Dangers to the Community and the Question of State Control' at the Seventeenth International Congress of Medicine in London. Blaschko was a committed internationalist, and in 1914 he refused to add his signature to a nationalistic declaration from German intellectuals and instead expressed hope for bridges between warring nations. Blaschko was from an old-established Jewish family and had three children which included Hermann ('Hugh') who escaped from Germany in 1933. Hugh Blaschko became a biochemical pharmacologist best known for discovering how adrenaline (epinephrine), noradrenaline (norepinephrine), and dopamine were synthesized, stored, and metabolized in the body.

== Selected writings ==
- Syphilis und Prostitution vom Standpunkt der öffentlichen Gesundheitspflege. Berlin, 1893. (Syphilis and prostitution from the standpoint of public health care).
- Hygiene der Prostitution und venerischen Krankheiten. Jena, 1900. (Hygiene of prostitution and venereal diseases).
- Die Neven-verteilung in der Haut in ihrer Beziehung zu den Erkrankungen der Haut. Beilage zu den Verhandlungen der Deutschen Dermatologischen Gesellschaft VII Congress, Breslau, 1901.
