= Joshua Harold Burn =

British pharmacologist (1892–1981)

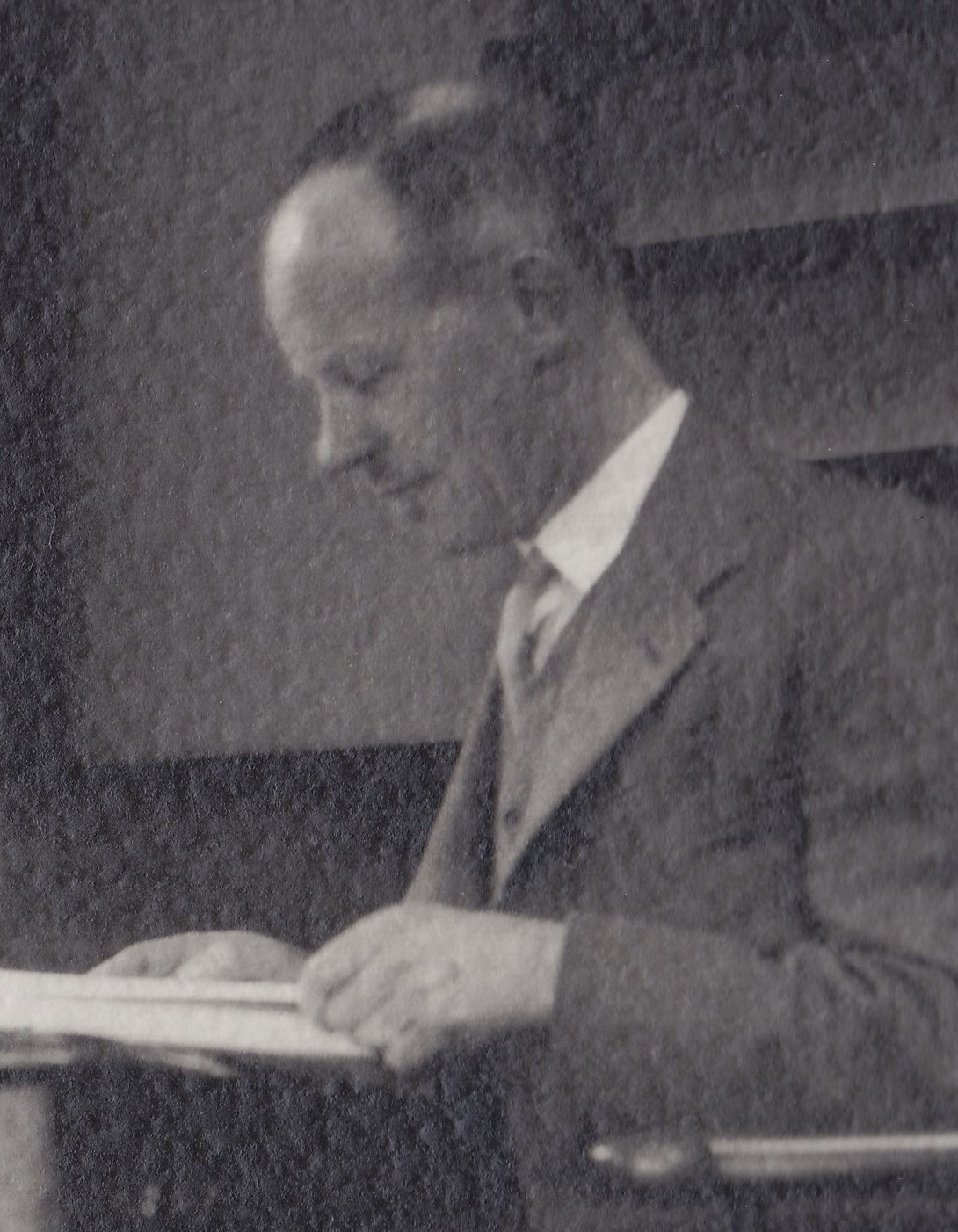
- Burn in 1937
- Born: 6 March 1892; Barnard Castle, England
- Died: 13 July 1981 (aged 89)
- Awards: Fellow of the Royal Society
- Scientific career
- Fields: Pharmacology

Joshua Harold Burn FRS (6 March 1892 – 13 July 1981) was an English pharmacologist and professor of pharmacology, leading the Department of Pharmacology.

The Nobel Laureate John Vane claimed "If anyone can be said to have moulded the subject of pharmacology around the world, it is he".

== Life ==
Burn was born in Barnard Castle, County Durham, England. He was educated at Barnard Castle School. Burn entered Emmanuel College, Cambridge in 1909 where he read the Natural Sciences Tripos. He specialised in physiology for Part II. His tutor was Frederick Gowland Hopkins. After receiving his BA he was awarded a research grant by Emmanuel College and a Michael Foster Studentship by the university. The next 18 months were spent in research with Joseph Barcroft. Other figures in physiology at Cambridge at the time were Keith Lucas and the Nobel Laureates Archibald Hill and Edgar Adrian. In January 1914 Burn went to work for Henry Hallett Dale in London.

In October 1914, Burn enlisted in the army as a Signals Officer with the rank of corporal. By the end of 1917 he was required to return to England to finish his medical training. From 1920 to 1926 he worked with Henry Dale at the National Institute for Medical Research in Hampstead. His work involved the standardisation of medicines. In 1925 he was appointed director of the Pharmacological Laboratories at the Pharmaceutical Society of Great Britain, again involved in the standardisation of medicines. Between 1926 and 1937 Burn had 44 co-workers, of which 30 came from overseas. From 1933 he worked closely with Edith Bülbring who was an exile from Nazi Germany. In 1931 he was a founder member of the British Pharmacological Society and he was a member of the commission that produced the reforming British Pharmacopoeia in 1932. In 1933 he was appointed Dean of The School of Pharmacy, University of London.

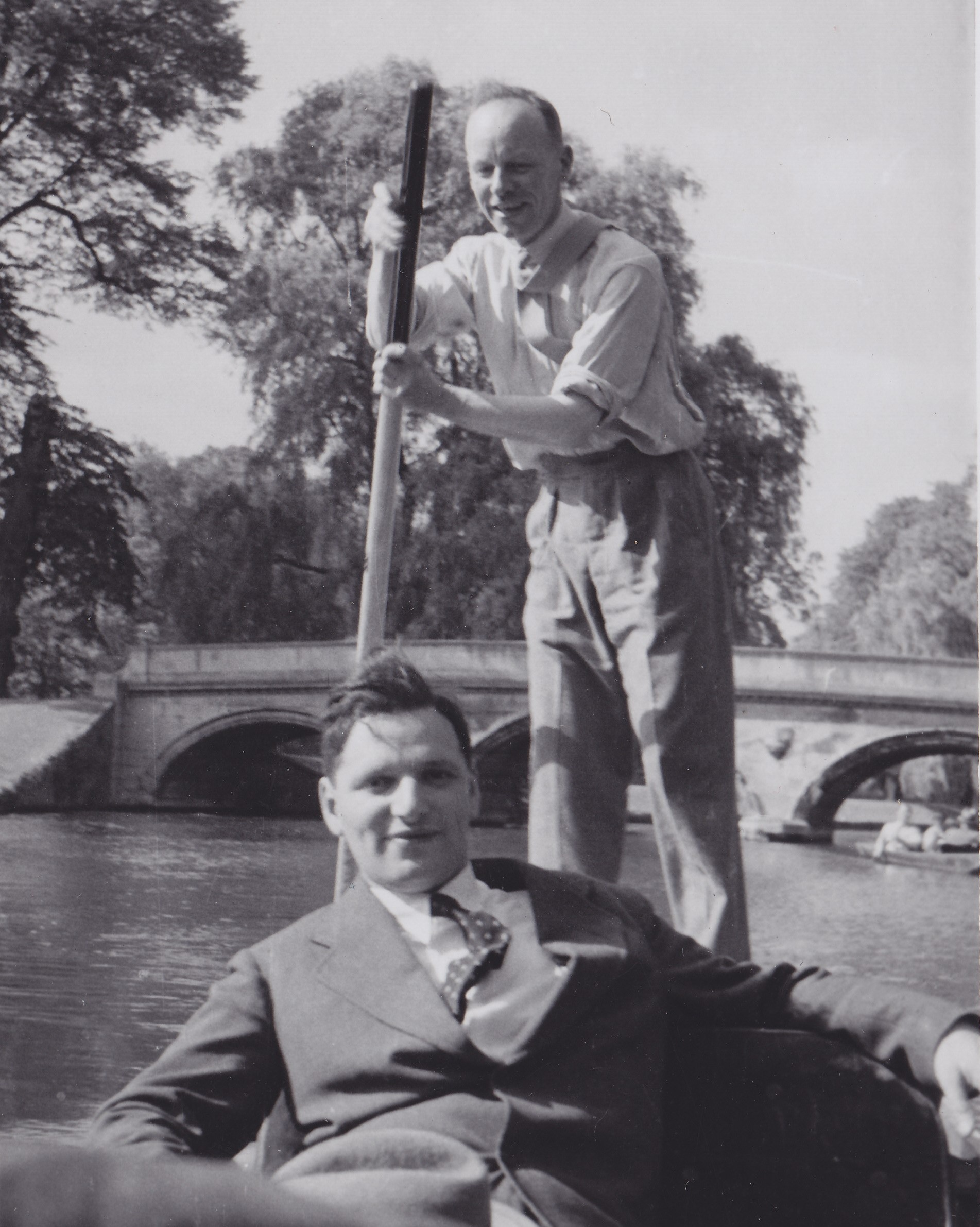
JH Burn punting WS Feldberg in Cambridge in 1936 (British Pharmacological Society meeting)

From 1937 to 1959 Burn held the chair of Pharmacology at the University of Oxford. Over the years he had 162 academic staff, including John Robert Vane (1927–2004), one of three winners of the Nobel Prize in Physiology or Medicine in 1982. Burn also recruited chemist Harry Raymond Ing FRS (1899-1974) in 1939 and pharmacologist Hugh Blaschko FRS (1900-1993) in 1944 who was a Jewish exile from Nazi Germany.

Burn was an honorary Doctor of Yale University, the University of Mainz and the University of Bradford. He was an honorary member of the British Pharmacological Society, the German Pharmacological Society and the Czechoslovak Medical Society of Jan Evangelista Purkyně and a member of the Leopoldina and a Fellow of the Royal Society (elected 1942) . In 1967 he received the Schmiedeberg-badge of the German Pharmacological Society and was the first recipient of the Wellcome Gold Medal of the British Pharmacological Society in 1979.

== Publications ==
Methods of Biological Assay, 1928; Recent Advances in Materia Medica, 1931; Biological Standardization, 1937; Background of Therapeutics, 1948; Lecture Notes on Pharmacology, 1948; Practical Pharmacology, 1952; Functions of Autonomic Transmitters, 1956; The Principles of Therapeutics, 1957; Drugs, Medicines and Man, 1962; The Autonomic Nervous System, 1963; Our most interesting Diseases, 1964; A Defence of John Balliol, 1970
