= Oleh Hornykiewicz =

Austrian biochemist (1926–2020)

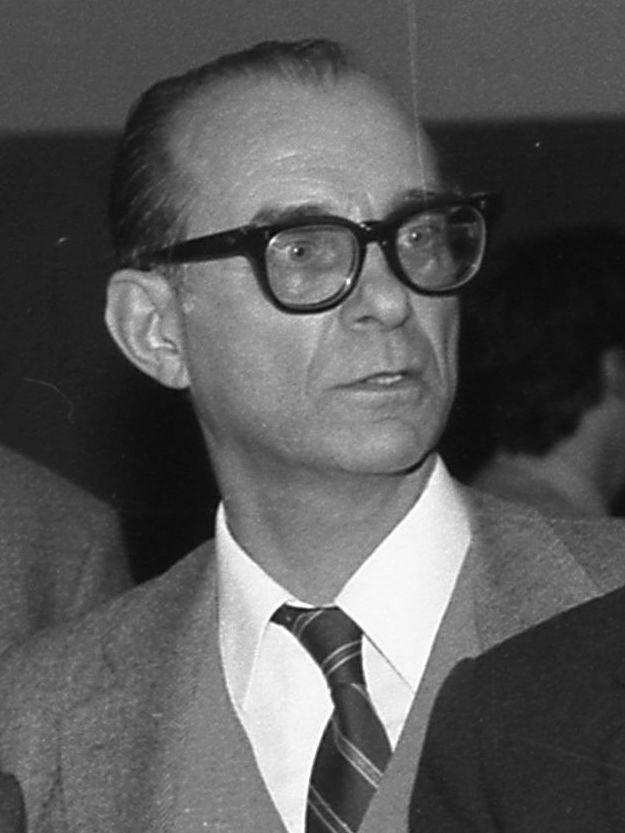
Hornykiewicz in 1985

Oleh Hornykiewicz (17 November 1926 – 26 May 2020) was a Ukrainian/British/Austrian/Canadian biochemist. One of his seminal accomplishments was the discovery that Parkinson's disease was caused by dopamine deficiency in the brain. He also played a key role in the development of L-dopa as a therapy for the disorder.

== Life ==
Oleh Hornykiewicz was born in 1926 in Sychów (now a district of Lviv), then in Poland (now Ukraine). In 1940, with his family, he fled the Soviet invasion of Poland to Vienna, where at age 13 he had to learn German to attend school. He lived through the difficult years of Nazi rule and the devastation that followed World War II. These experiences helped shape his resilience and determination later in life.

He contracted tuberculosis and, like his brother, became interested in medicine. In 1951 he received an M.D. degree from the University of Vienna. In 1956 he obtained a scholarship from the British Council and joined the lab of Herman Blaschko at the University of Oxford, UK. Blaschko introduced him to leading figures in neuroscience and inspired his investigation of dopamine as a neurotransmitter. He confirmed that dopamine lowers blood pressure and showed that its precursor, L-dopa, produces a similar effect.

In 1953 Hornykiewicz joined the faculty of his Viennese alma mater and began studying the brains of people who had had Parkinson’s disease in life. He discovered that people with Parkinson’s disease had about 90% less dopamine in a brain region important for movement. This led him to test L-dopa, which restores dopamine, as a treatment. L-dopa dramatically improved movement and remains one of the main treatments for Parkinson’s disease. He also discovered that the brain can compensate for dopamine loss by making better use of remaining dopamine-producing neurons. His work helped establish the now-common practice of studying human brain tissue to understand neurological diseases.

In 1967 he began a long association with the University of Toronto in Canada. At the University's Clarke Institute Hornykiewicz and his colleagues Kenneth Lloyd and Ted Sourkes showed that L-dopa is converted into dopamine in the brain, confirming a prediction from Hornykiewicz's earlier clinical research. While Arvid Carlsson was one of three recipients of the 2000 Nobel Prize in Physiology or Medicine for related discoveries, Hornykiewicz was not included, a decision that disappointed many scientists.

During Hornykiewicz's 70-year scientific career, his ground-breaking work was recognized with many major awards, including the Parkinson's Disease Association's Gold Medal, the Wolf Prize, and the Wittgenstein Prize. In 1992 he was named professor emeritus at the University of Toronto and at his alma mater, the University of Vienna. His obituaries described a life of exceptional achievement.

== Awards ==
- 1972: Gairdner Foundation International Award
- 1979: Wolf Prize in Medicine, jointly with Roger Wolcott Sperry and Arvid Carlsson, "for opening a new approach in the control of Parkinson's disease by L-Dopa."
- 1993: Ludwig Wittgenstein Prize of the Austrian Science Foundation
- 1994: Schmiedeberg Medal of the German Society for Experimental and Clinical Pharmacology and Toxicology
- 2001: Bill Roth Medal
- 2008: Austrian Cross of Honour for Science and Art, 1st class
- 2010: Austrian Decoration for Science and Art
- 2014: Warren Alpert Foundation Prize
