= James Andrew Gunn =

British pharmacologist (1882–1958)

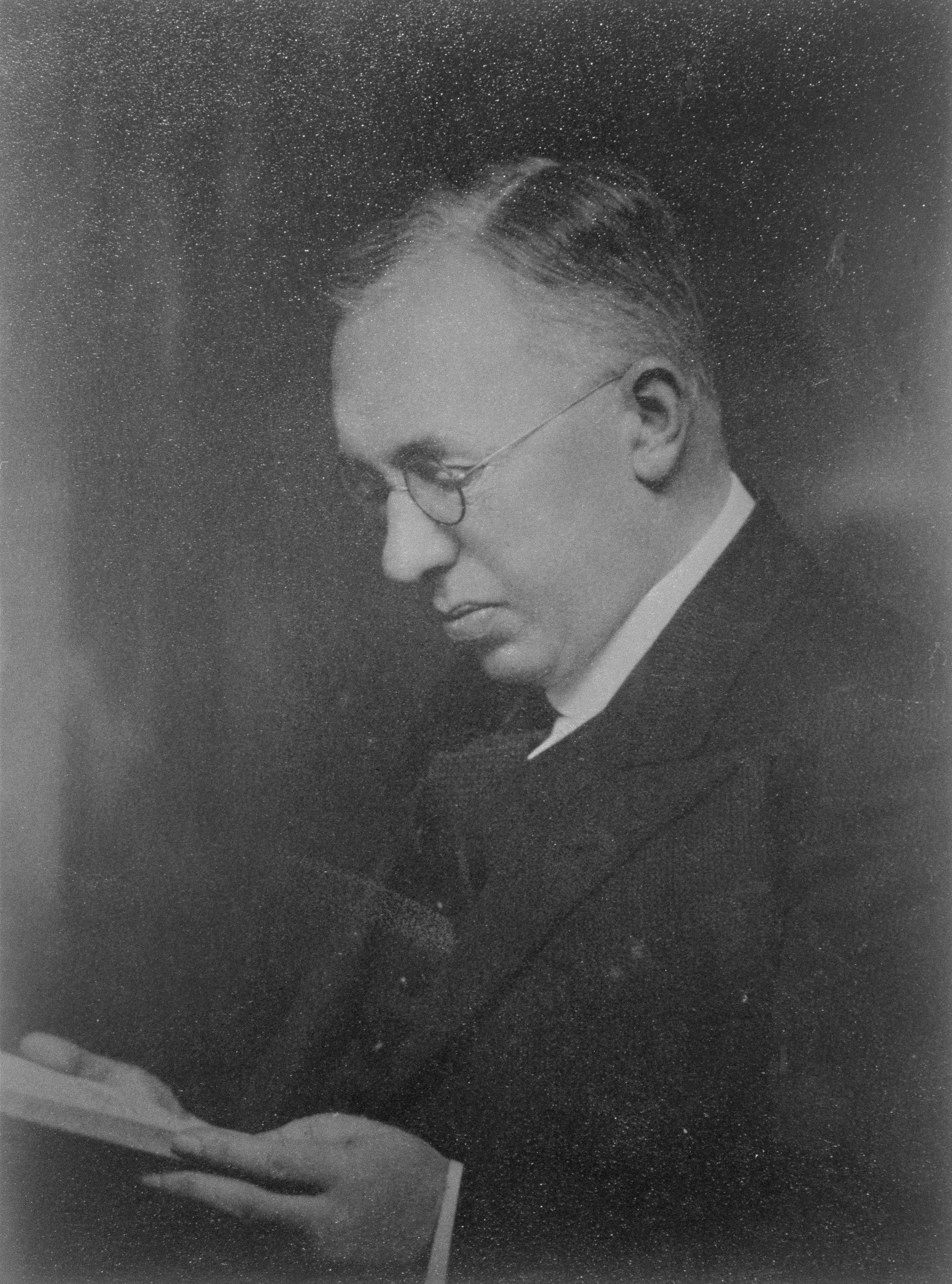
- Born: 26 January 1882
- Died: 21 October 1958 (aged 76)
- Education: University of Edinburgh
- Known for: First statutory chair of pharmacology in the University of Oxford, and initiated the British Pharmacological Society
- Scientific career
- Fields: Pharmacology

Signature
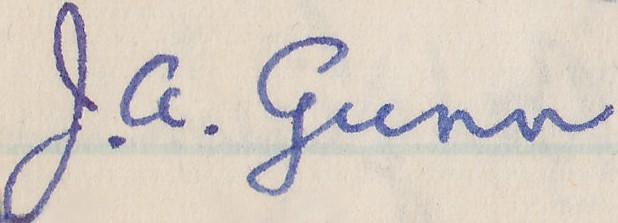

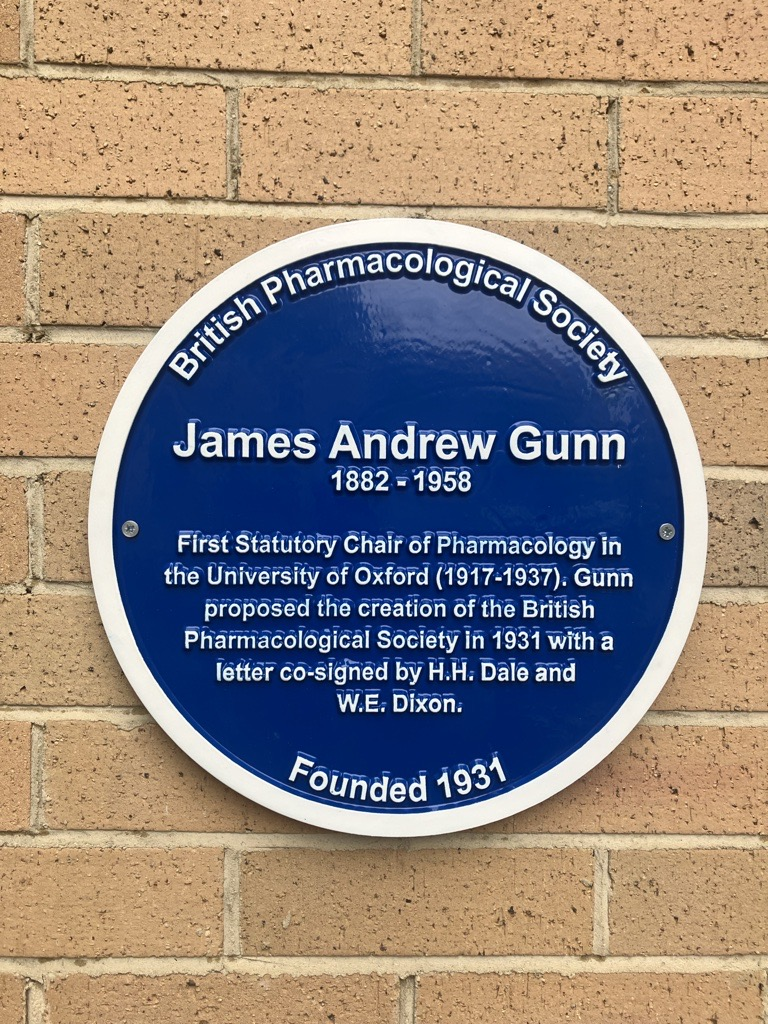
Blue plaque remembering James Andrew Gunn, at the Department of Pharmacology, University of Oxford

James Andrew Gunn (26 January 1882 – 21 October 1958) was a British pharmacologist who initiated the British Pharmacological Society in 1931 with Sir Henry Hallett Dale and Walter Ernest Dixon.

== Early life and education ==
Gunn was born at Kirkwall, Orkney where his father, John R. Gunn was a well-known ornithologist. Gunn attended Kirkwall Grammar School where he learnt to write good prose. He was educated at the University of Edinburgh where he won prizes and scholarships. Gunn graduated with five degrees with an M.A. in 1901, a BSc. in 1903, a Ch.B. in 1905, an M.D. in 1907 (gold medalist) and a D.Sc. in 1909.

== Research and career ==
After graduating he gained experience of medical practice in the islands of Scotland. He then joined the staff of the Department of Materia Medica in Edinburgh under physician and pharmacologist Sir Thomas Richard Fraser who with chemist, Alexander Crum Brown FRS, made systematic attempts to study the structure-action relationships of drugs. Gunn carried out all the teaching with a colleague, while Gunn also carried out research into arsenic, yohimbine, cobra venom and harmine.

In 1912 he was awarded a Beit Fellowship in Edinburgh, but before starting he was appointed Reader in Pharmacology in the University of Oxford. His lectures were popular and he was described as having an attractive Orcadian accent. In 1917 he was made the first Professor of Pharmacology in Oxford. During WWI he served in the R.A.M.C. and conducted research for the Ministry of Munitions into the action of irritant gases on bronchi, and on poisoning by salvarsan used for treating syphilis.

Following an endowment from the Sir William Dunn Trustees for a new building for pathology in 1927, Gunn proposed using the vacated pathology building for pharmacology. Gunn's proposal was supported for refurbishment for teaching and research facilities, and to expand the departmental library.

In 1931 Gunn initiated the British Pharmacological Society with a letter signed with Sir Henry Dale and Dr. W. E. Dixon. The first meeting of 19 pharmacologists took place in Oxford after the Physiological Society meeting on Friday 3 July 1931 with a meal in Wadham College. Papers were given the following day in the department of pharmacology.

Gunn's main line of research was in adrenaline starting as a student of Sharpey-Shafer who was appointed chair of physiology in 1899 in Edinburgh. Gunn investigated the action of the amines which formed a series beginning with phenylethylamine and ending with adrenaline. He was an acknowledged authority on alkaloids of Peganum harmala which he studied for 25 years.

Gunn moved from pharmacology in 1937 to become the first director of the Nuffield Institute for Medical Research in the University of Oxford.

In 1940, Gunn edited the 12th edition of Arthur Robertson Cushny’s ‘ A Textbook of Pharmacology and Therapeutics’. Gunn's book ‘Introduction to Pharmacology and Therapeutics’ first published in 1929 led to nine editions over 30 years. In 1939 he was appointed Chairman of the British Pharmacopoeia Commission, where he was responsible for the British Pharmacopoeia in 1948.

== Personal life ==
In 1925 Gunn suffered from a serious illness of streptococcal infection which led to losing sight in one eye. A decision was made for his eye to be removed but his young son noticed his eye was better and his eye was left in place.

He was married to his wife Anne Marie and together they had four children with a daughter and three sons, one of whom was killed in fighting in Italy.

He enjoyed books, golf and fishing. During his last twelve years he lived in Newbury, Berkshire where he died at the age of seventy-six.
