= Peter Somogyi =

Peter Somogyi FRS FMedSci
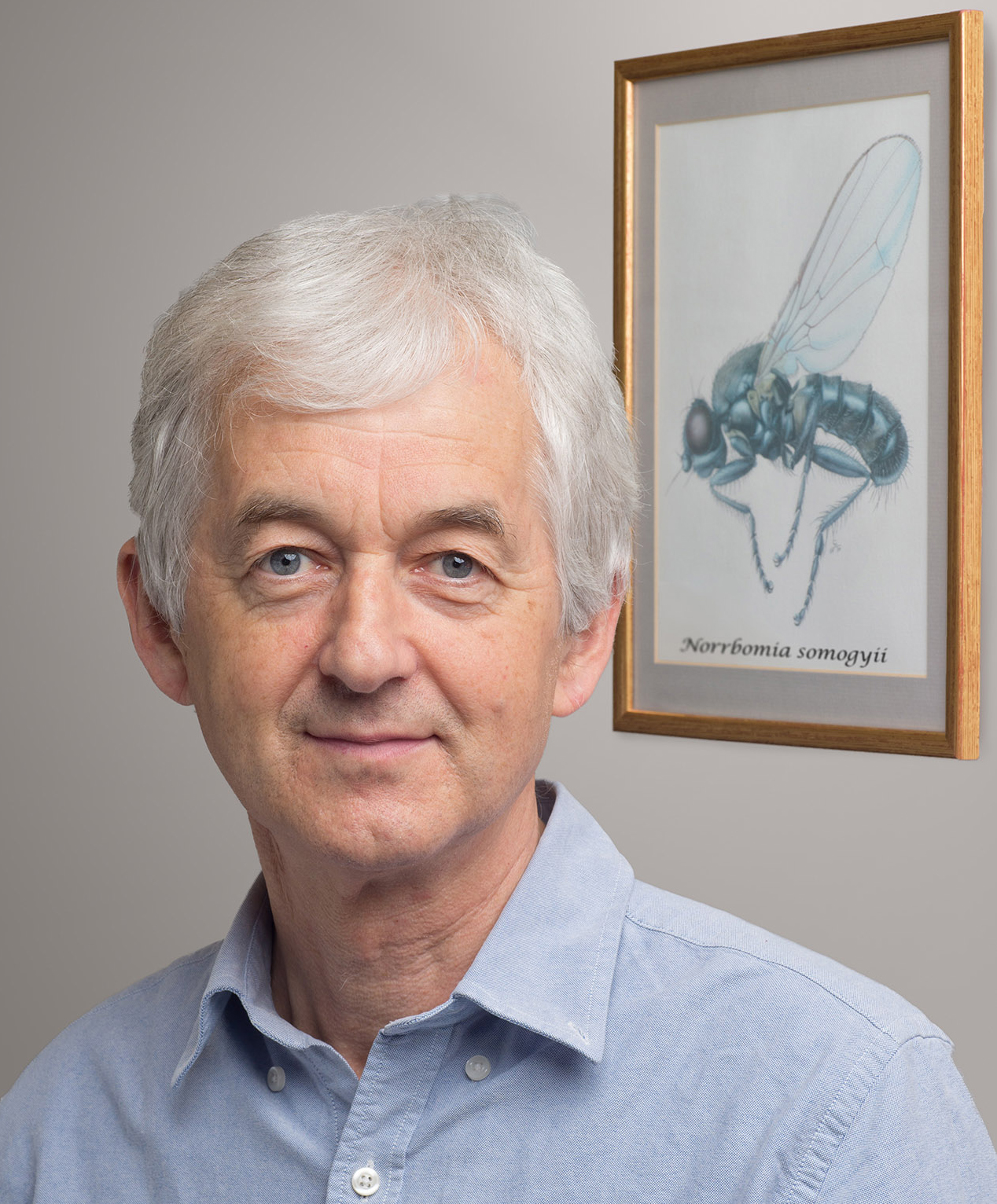
- Born: 27 February 1950 (age 76)
- Occupation: Professor of Neurobiology
- Employer: University of Oxford
- Known for: Research on neuronal networks in the brain
- Website: https://pharm.ox.ac.uk/research/somogyi-group

Peter Somogyi is the former Director of the Medical Research Council Anatomical Neuropharmacology Unit at the University Department of Pharmacology, University of Oxford, England.

Somogyi's discoveries relate to understanding ways in which networks of neurons work in the brain. His first key discovery was to find that each 'chandelier cell' in the cerebral cortex exclusively forms synaptic connections only with the initial axon segments of potentially hundreds of pyramidal cells. This is one example of a type of axo-axonic synapse. Somogyi followed this up to discover at least 21 types of connecting neurons (interneurons) in just part of the brain (hippocampus), each one of which formed synapses with specific parts of other neurons. Somogyi then studied the electrical activity of neurons and their spatial organisation, which he named the 'chronocircuit' within the cortex of the brain.

Amongst many scientific honours he was elected as a fellow of the Royal Society in 2000, and awarded the first (together with Hungarian co-winners Gyorgy Buzsaki and Tamás Freund) Grete Lundbeck European Brain Research Foundation Brain Prize in 2011. He was elected a fellow of the Academy of Medical Sciences in 2006.
