= Edith Bülbring =

British pharmacologist

- Born: 27 December 1903; Bonn, Germany
- Died: 5 July 1990 (aged 86); Oxford, England
- Education: University of Bonn; Ludwig-Maximilians-Universität München; University of Freiburg
- Known for: Studying smooth muscle and catecholamines
- Scientific career
- Fields: Pharmacology
- Workplaces: Friedrich Wilhelm University of Berlin; Pharmaceutical Society of Great Britain; Department of Pharmacology, University of Oxford

Edith Bülbring, FRS (27 December 1903 – 5 July 1990) was a British scientist in the field of smooth muscle physiology, one of the first women accepted to the Royal Society as a fellow (FRS). She was professor of pharmacology in the Department of Pharmacology, University of Oxford (1967–71) and professorial fellow of Lady Margaret Hall, Oxford, later emeritus professor (1971–1990).

Born in Bonn, Germany, Bülbring was the daughter of Hortense Leonore and Karl Bülbring, a professor of English. She was educated in medicine at the University of Bonn, the Ludwig-Maximilians-Universität München, and the University of Freiburg, and became research assistant to the pharmacologist Ulrich Friedemann. When he and other Jewish colleagues were dismissed by the Nazis, she was initially overlooked, because she was only partly Jewish (her mother was Jewish), but eventually she was dismissed too.

Together with her older sisters Luci and Maud, she travelled to England in 1933, where she joined the laboratory of Joshua Harold Burn at the Pharmaceutical Society of Great Britain, University of London. When Burn was offered the post of professor of pharmacology at Oxford in 1938, she went with him. She remained as Burn's assistant until 1946, when she was appointed university demonstrator and lecturer, and began to conduct her own research independently. From 1950 until she retired in 1971 she led a flourishing research group exploring the physiology of smooth muscle, an area that had hitherto been neglected.

She was elected a fellow of the Royal Society in 1958.

== Biography ==
=== Childhood ===
Edith Bülbring was born in Bonn on 27 December 1903 to Hortense Leonore Bülbring (née Kann; 1868–1938), the Dutch daughter of a Jewish banker from The Hague, and Dr. Karl Bülbring, a German Professor of English at the University of Bonn (1863–1917). Although her mother came from a Jewish background and her father was Protestant, Edith was atheist. She was the youngest of four children (Hans, Luci, Maud and Edith). At the age of six, Edith began to learn the piano and she appeared to be very talented. During World War I (WWI; 1914–1918) Edith and her two older sisters moved to The Hague, the Netherlands to stay with their uncle, the prominent Royal banker Jacobus Henricus Kann. Hans, her brother, was a soldier in World War I and was killed in 1918. Although she became a proficient piano player, she decided to study medicine instead of music, a fact that surprised her teacher as Edith had shown real talent.

=== University life ===
In 1923 Bülbring entered the University of Bonn to study physiology hoping to eventually read medicine. Her enthusiasm for histology led her to work in the laboratory of Boeke, a renowned anatomist. The techniques she acquired during this working period became the basis for her work of her first publication and doctorate in medicine.

Bülbring spent a year in Munich focusing on internal medicine, paediatrics and surgery attracted by the reputation of Friedrich von Müller, a Professor of Internal Medicine. The following year she moved to Freiburg for a semester, where she attended the lectures of Paul Trendelenburg. She then returned to Bonn for her final year.

In Bonn she was supervised by Professor Ceelen, a pathological anatomist. For her dissertation, she applied a technique she had learned from Boeke on how to stain nerve fibres to the cells of phaeochromocytoma, showing they also pushed out nerve fibres. It was submitted on 3 May 1928 and published as volume 268 of Virchows Archiv.

Following the completion of her studies she moved to Berlin to work as a house physician. A year later, she was persuaded by Paul Trendelenburg to work at his laboratory at the Friedrich Wilhelm University of Berlin. While in his laboratory she was required to demonstrate the perfused frog heart in which inflow and outflow resistance could be controlled. She used this preparation later on in her studies of drug action (published in 1930).

After the death of her mentor, Paul Trendelenburg, she left Berlin for a year and worked as a paediatrician in Jena. She returned to Berlin a year later (in 1932) to work at the infectious disease unit in the Virchow Krankenhaus. While living in Berlin, the rise of the Nazi party began was a concern of Bülbring due to her Jewish ancestry. She was dismissed from the hospital, as it was made illegal for people of Jewish background to hold university or other professional posts. Soon after her dismissal she left for England with her sisters, Luci and Maud.

=== Smooth muscle 1950–1990 ===
Bülbring's interest in smooth muscle was borne from frustration with their unpredictable responses. She has been quoted saying: "Using them [smooth muscles] for assays and always finding them totally incomprehensible; I just could not understand their behavior: why they would contract one time and relax the next hour to the same dose, at the same temperature, in the same conditions, and so forth. All these things upset me to such a degree that I did not want to work with them in this way anymore unless I understood them."

In 1953 Gustav Born joined Bülbring in her work initiating a collaboration that became the origin of her smooth muscle group. Early on with the group, she researched the metabolism and passive electrical properties of smooth muscle. She also studied the role that serotonin plays in peristalsis in the small intestine. She innovated a double sucrose gap apparatus that she used in her experiments. Bülbring was concerned with the effect that neurotransmitters, particularly acetylcholine and adrenaline, have on smooth muscle tension. She published three papers on taeniae in 1969 which concluded that the hyperpolarisation of the membrane that can be observed following the application of adrenaline is a result of the membrane's increased permeability to chloride and potassium.

Bülbring was known to have a strong respect for her colleagues and their work. She encouraged people to develop their techniques, skills and be independent scientists. She always showed great ability to obtaining funds for her work, creating relationships with charities, councils and industry partners. These capacities combined allowed for the group to build a large research group.

Bülbring's influence and work throughout a 40-year span allowed the fledgling field of smooth muscle to burgeon. The techniques developed in her laboratory led to increasing knowledge of the physiology of smooth muscle, and the activities of the many scientists who spent time working with her spread her interest and enthusiasm for the in-depth study of this type of tissues all over the world.

=== Death and legacy ===
Bülbring's work on catecholamines and on smooth muscle led to her election to the Royal Society in 1958. Her multiple successes were recognised widely for which she received a number of awards, including The Schmiedeberg-Plakette of the Deutsche Pharmakologische Gesellschaft, The Wellcome Gold Medal in Pharmacology, and honorary degrees in Groningen, Leuven and Homburg (Saar).

After retiring in 1971, Bülbring worked in a laboratory at the Physiology Laboratory in Oxford. Atherosclerosis and an old ankle injury that caused her to have poor circulation to her foot led to the amputation of her leg below the knee. A septuagenarian, she had a Swiss prosthesis made and had modifications made to her car, returning to her work. When her atherosclerosis progressed and the circulation in her other leg began failing, she tried all manner of treatments. Following a risky operation, Bulbring died on 5 July 1990.

Bülbring has been acknowledged by physiologists and pharmacologists as the most influential smooth muscle physiologist in the world. Her contribution to smooth muscle physiology and pharmacology and that of her collaborators laid the foundations on which investigation on smooth muscle is based.

== Family ==
- Father: Dr. Karl Bülbring (1863–1917)
- Mother: Hortense Leonore Bülbring (née Kann; 1868–1938)
- Siblings: Hans Bülbring (brother, 1898–1918), Luci Bülbring (sister, 1900–?) and Maud Bülbring (sister, 1902–1960)

== Publications from work at Oxford ==
- 1972 Recent developments in the study of drug action on cellular mechanisms ill smooth muscle. International Congress of Pharmacology, 4. Manus P/1-P/2.
- 1973 (with D.M. Needham) ed. A discussion on recent development in vertebrate smooth muscle physiology. Phil. Trans. Roy. Soc. Lond. B. 265, 1–231.
- (with H. Kuriyama) The action of catecholamines on guinea-pig taenia coli. PhiL Trans. R. Soc. Lond. B., 265, 115–121.
- (with J.H. Szurszewski) The stimulant action of acetylcholine and catecholamines on the uterus. Phil. Trans. R. Soc. Lond. B., 265, 149–155.
- Action of catecholamines on the smooth muscle cell membrane. pp. 1–13 In: "Drug Receptors", ed. H.P. Rang. Macmillan London.
- Possible mechanism of the action of catecbolamines on smooth muscle. pp. 389–391 in Frontiers in Catecholamine Research. eels, E. Usdin & S. Snyder. Pergamon London.
- 1974 (with J.H. Szurszewski) The stimulant action of noradrenaline (α-action) on guinea-pig myometrium compared with that of acetylcholine. Proc. Roy. Soc. Lond. B., 185, 225–262.
- Scientific Visits to China under arrangements between the Academia Sinica: and the Royal Society. Report on visit 10th to 25 November 1973 p. 14-33. The Royal Society.
- 1975 (with J.H. Hardman) Effects on smooth muscle of nucleotides and the dibutyryl analogues of cyclic nucleotides. INSERM, SO, 125–133.
- 1976 (with M.F. Shuba) eel. Physiology of Smooth Muscle. Kiev Symp. 1975 Raven Press, New York.
- Catecholamines then and now. J. Pharm. Pharmac. 28, 348–355.
- 1977 (with A Den Henog) The 8-action of catecholamines on the smooth muscle of guinea-pia taenia coli. J. Physiol. 268. 29P-30P.
- (with T. Tomita) The alpha-action of catecholamines on the guinea-pig taenia coli in K-free and Na-free solution and in the presence of ouabain. Proc. Roy. Soc. Lond. B., 197, 255–269.
- (with T. Tomita) Calcium requirement for the alpha-action of catecholamines on guinea-pig taenia coli. Proc. Roy. Soc. Lond. B., 197, 271–284.
- 1978 (with T.B. Bolton) Adrenoceptors in visceral smooth muscle. pp. 7–13 In: "Recent Advances in the Pharmacology of Adrenoceptors". eds E. Szabadi, C.M. Bradshaw and P. Bevan. Elsevier, Amsterdam.
- 1979 (with T. Tomita and S. Usune) The essential role of Ca in the response of the smooth muscle cell membrane to catecholamines. IV International Catecholamine Symposium, pp 429–431 in Catecholamines: Basic and Clinical Frontiers. Eds. Usdin Kopin and Barchas. Pergamon. London.
- Postjunctional adrenergic mechanisms. Brit. Med. Bull. vol. 3S 2SS-293. (with T.B. Bolton) ed. Smooth Muscle. Brit. Med. Bull.vol. 35.
- 1980 (with A. Den Henog) The action of isoprenaline on the smooth muscle of guinea pig taenia coli. J. Physiol. 304, 277–296.
- 1981 (with H. Ohashi and T. Tomita) Adrenergic mechanisms. pp. 219–293 in "Smooth Muscle :an assessment of current knowledge", E. Bülbring, A.F. Brading, A.W. Jones & T. Tomita. Edward Arnold, London.
- (with A.F. Brading, A.W. Jones and T. Tomita) eds. "Smooth Muscle: an assessment of current knowledge•. Edward Arnold. London.
- 1984 (with J.M. Walker) Joshua Harold Bum, 1892–1981. Biographical Memoirs of Fellows of the Royal Society, 30, 45–89.
- 1987 (with T. Tomita) Catecholamine action on smooth muscle. Pharmacological Reviews, Vol. 39, 49–96.

== Bibliography ==
- A. F. Brading, ‘Bülbring, Edith (1903–1990)’, rev. Oxford Dictionary of National Biography, Oxford University Press, 2004 accessed 19 Oct 2012
- Medawar, Jean; Pyke, David (2012). Hitler's Gift: The True Story of the Scientists Expelled by the Nazi Regime (Paperback). New York: Arcade Publishing. ISBN 978-1-61145-709-4.
