= Joe Collier (clinical pharmacologist) =

British clinical pharmacologist and professor (born 1942)

- Joe Collier, 2026
- Born: Joseph Gavin Collier; 1942 (age 83–84); England
- Education: Cambridge University; St George's Hospital and Medical School
- Occupations: Clinical pharmacologist and professor
- Known for: Research on nitric oxide and ACE; Whistleblower for medical schools admissions (1986-1988); Editor of Drug and Therapeutics Bulletin; National policy work and drug pricing
- Spouse: Rohan (m. 1965)
- Scientific career
- Fields: Clinical pharmacology
- Website: Official website

Joseph Gavin Collier FRCP (born 1942) is a British retired clinical pharmacologist and emeritus professor of medicines policy at St George's Hospital and Medical School in London, whose early research included establishing the effect of aspirin on human prostaglandins and looking at the role of nitric oxide and angiotensin converting enzyme in controlling blood vessel tone and blood pressure. Later, in his national policy work, he helped change the way drugs are priced and bought by the NHS, and ensured that members of governmental advisory committees published their conflicts of interest.

In 1986, he became a whistleblower when he revealed to the Commission for Racial Equality that software used for medical-school admissions selection at St George's was intentionally discriminating against women and ethnic minorities, by creating a lower score for women and those with non-European names so reducing their chance of being called for interview. Initially shunned within the institution, he was publicly thanked several years later for bringing the procedure to its attention. His work led to reviews of admissions policy to institutes of higher education throughout the UK.

He was editor of the Drug and Therapeutics Bulletin from 1992 to 2004, president of the International Society of Drug Bulletins from 2002 to 2005 and was a former member of the UK Medicines Commission from 1998.

== Early life and education ==
Joseph Gavin Collier was born to pharmacologist Henry Oswald Jackson Collier and actress Patience Collier. They also had two daughters, Sarah Campbell and Susan Collier.

Collier was educated at Latymer Upper School in Hammersmith and Trinity Hall, Cambridge, where he studied natural sciences. After attending Cambridge, he gained admission to St George's Medical School in London to study medicine in 1964 and graduated in 1968. He gained a MD in 1975.

== Career ==
Collier's career at St George's continued until his retirement in 2007. He was the school's first clinical pharmacologist and in 1998 was appointed professor of medicines policy. Among the lecturers he supervised were David Webb, Patrick Vallance, and Emma Baker.

=== Research ===
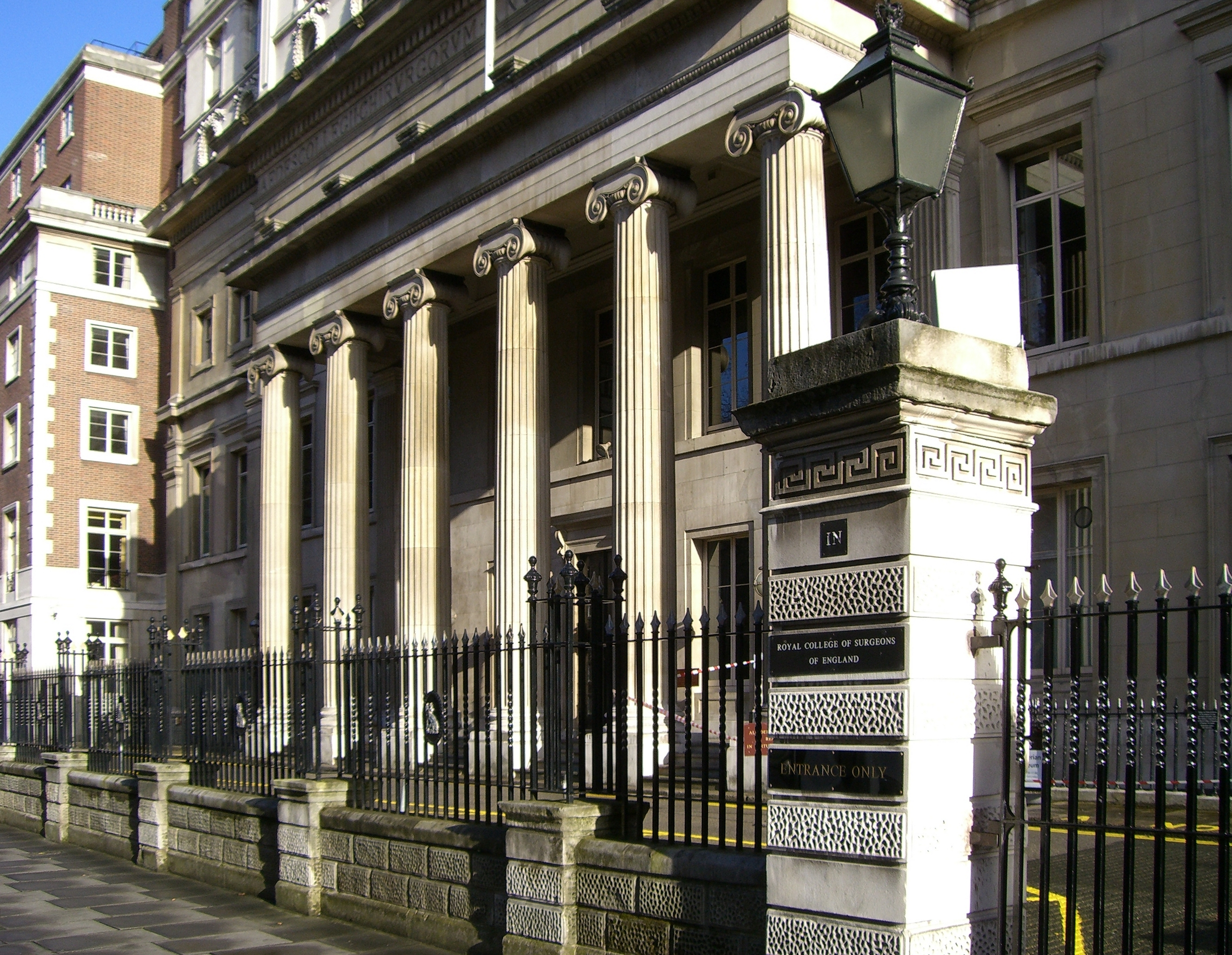
Royal College of Surgeons of England, where Collier did his early research

Collier interspersed his junior medical training with two days a week at a laboratory situated in the Royal College of Surgeons in Lincoln's Inn Fields, run by John Vane. In 1969, Collier confirmed, with Dornhorst, Lands' findings of β1-receptors in the heart and β2-receptors in the airways, in humans, and "suggested that the respiratory stimulation produced in man by β-receptor stimulants is a β1-action and is not linked with bronchodilatation." In 1971, he co-authored a paper with Rod Flower showing that therapeutic doses of aspirin reduced prostaglandin E and F in human semen.

His early research included looking at the veins of the back of the hand, and the behaviour of human peripheral blood vessels, being first to develop methods for studying how human veins respond to drugs and natural mediators in vivo and developed the idea that human veins and arterioles have very different pharmacologies. Through this work he classified vasoactive drugs as veno-selective, arteriolar-selective or non-selective, and that depending on their selectivity they would have different effects in disease.

He later looked at the role of nitric oxide and angiotensin converting enzyme in controlling blood vessel tone. In 1987, he set out with Patrick Vallance to investigate whether human blood vessels demonstrated endothelium-dependent relaxation, a term coined in 1980 by Robert F. Furchgott and John V. Zawadzki after discovering that a large blood vessel would not relax when its single-layered inner most lining was removed. They subsequently showed that the occurrence was mediated by what they called endothelium-derived relaxing factor, later found to be nitric oxide, and it was subsequently shown to occur in a variety of animals. Using veins from the back of a human hand, Collier and his team reproduced Furchgott and Zawadzki's findings. They then demonstrated that the human arterial vasculature is actively dilated by a continuous release of nitric oxide. In 1996, Vallance presented his and Collier's findings at the Goulstonian Lecture of the Royal College of Physicians, where he gave details of the connection between nitric oxide and blood pressure.

=== Commission for Racial Equality ===
Professor Joe Collier, Black History Month at St George's Hospital, 2026

Collier became a whistleblower in 1986 when, following his report published jointly with psychiatrist A. W. Burke, he informed the Commission for Racial Equality that software used for medical-school admissions selection at St George's had been developed to intentionally discriminate against women and ethnic minorities, by mimicking methods of previous admissions officers. It was creating a lower score for women and those with non-European (Asian, African and Arabic) names so reducing their chance of being called for interview.

Collier's findings led to an enquiry, both internal by St George's and external by the CRE, and a subsequent report was published entitled Medical School Admissions: Report of a formal investigation into St. George's Hospital Medical School (1988). Like Collier and Burke, the report also raised the question of what might be happening in other London medical schools; St George's already had a higher than average intake of students with non-European names. Collier was initially shunned within the institution and denied a due professorship. As attitudes changed, his position improved; he was promoted to professor and eventually the medical school publicly thanked him. He discussed his experience in an article in the British Medical Journal in 1999 when he recalled that he "was ostracised, became invisible, told I [he] had brought the organisation into disrepute". Changes in admissions procedures to institutes of higher education have since been made throughout the UK and Collier has since been acknowledged for contributing towards greater equality in recruitment practices.

=== National policy ===
In his national policy work, he raised awareness of how drugs are priced, brought to the market and regulated, in addition to how they are evaluated, licensed and promoted, and how drug safety advice is produced and revised. He has spoken of the "excesses of industry", despite several general practitioners finding the pharmaceutical educational material they received as useful.

In 1993, he was appointed lead adviser on medicines to Parliament's Health Select Committee. In 1998, he was appointed to the Medicines Commission. He was one of the specialist scientific advisors who helped change the way drugs are priced and bought by the NHS. In 2007, Collier contributed to the report by the Office of Fair Trading, which recommended that drug prices to the NHS should be in accordance with their clinical value. In addition, he worked to ensure that members of governmental advisory committees published their conflicts of interest.

=== Drug and Therapeutics Bulletin ===
Collier began working for the Drug and Therapeutics Bulletin (DTB) in 1969. In 1972, he became its deputy editor and member of the DTB's Advisory Council, after at first being associate editor. He succeeded Andrew Herxheimer, who founded the bulletin, as its editor in 1992, and over the following 12 years shaped the bulletin in response to new challenges of the time, including the growth in electronic information, evidence-based guidelines, a growing demand to engage the public and healthcare workers and the establishment of the National Institute for Clinical Excellence (NICE).

=== Drug safety ===
In 1985, he complained to the Association of the British Pharmaceutical Industry that of 28 drug advertisements in the November 1985 issue of the British Medical Journal, 11 were in breach of the Medicines Act of 1968.

Known to frequently question evidence and arguments accepted by others, under his editorship in 1998, the DTB opposed the Department of Health's view and supported the provision of sildenafil on the NHS.

He later suggested that people should contribute to treatment agreements by signing their own prescriptions.

With regards to off-label prescribing of drugs for children, Collier argued that "the validity of such an approach is questionable because there are such great differences between adults and children, and even between children of different ages, with regard for instance to the pharmacodynamic and pharmacokinetic responses to drugs, […], and the effects of drugs on normal growth and development".

== Other roles ==
Collier is a Fellow of the Royal College of Physicians. He was elected president of the International Society of Drug Bulletins in 2002 and is a former member of the British Medicines Commission.

== Personal and family ==
Joe Collier 2025, speaking at the funeral of Aggrey Burke

In 1965, Collier met French philosophy student, Rohan. They married in 1968 and had three sons, the eldest of whom died suddenly in 2013. Following retirement Collier has become an active blogger and fluent in French.

== Awards and honours ==
In 2002, a walnut sculpture by Elona Bennett of several hands, including Collier's, was unveiled at St George's Hospital. Titled "Handing on Skills, Ideas and Ideals", his hands feature alongside those of other people, including Edward Jenner and John Hunter.

== Selected publications ==
=== Papers ===
- Co-authored with Dornhorst, A. C. (September 1969). "Evidence for Two Different Types of βReceptors in Man". Nature. 223 (5212): 1283–1284. Bibcode:1969Natur.223.1283C. doi:10.1038/2231283a0. ISSN 1476-4687. PMID 5807006. S2CID 4298944.
- Co-authored with Flower, R. J. (16 October 1971). "Effect of aspirin on human seminal prostaglandins". Lancet. 2 (7729): 852–853. doi:10.1016/s0140-6736(71)90225-x. ISSN 0140-6736. PMID 4106876.
- Co-authored with Robinson, B.F; Vane, J. R. (13 January 1973). "Reduction of pressor effects of angiotensin I in man by synthetic nonapeptide (B.P.P. 9a or SQ 20,881) which inhibits converting enzyme". Lancet. 1 (7794): 72–74. doi:10.1016/s0140-6736(73)90468-6. ISSN 0140-6736. PMID 4118651.
- Collier, J. (17 August 1985). "Licensing and provision of medicines in the United Kingdom. An appraisal". Lancet. 2 (8451): 377–381. ISSN 0140-6736. PMID 2862524.
- Co-authored with Burke, A. (March 1986). "Racial and sexual discrimination in the selection of students for London medical schools". Medical Education. 20 (2): 86–90. doi:10.1111/j.1365-2923.1986.tb01052.x. PMID 3959932. S2CID 29456272.
- Co-authored with Vallance, P. (13 August 1994). "Fortnightly Review Biology and clinical relevance of nitric oxide". British Medical Journal. 309 (6952): 453–457. doi:10.1136/bmj.309.6952.453. ISSN 0959-8138. PMC 2540939. PMID 7920131.
- "Tackling institutional racism: Personal view". British Medical Journal. 318 (7184): 679. 6 March 1999. doi:10.1136/bmj.318.7184.679. PMC 1115118. PMID 10066235.
- MacAllister, R. J.; Calver, A. L.; Riezebos, J.; Collier, J.; Vallance, P. (1 April 1995). "Relative potency and arteriovenous selectivity of nitrovasodilators on human blood vessels: an insight into the targeting of nitric oxide delivery". Journal of Pharmacology and Experimental Therapeutics. 273 (1): 154–160. ISSN 0022-3565. PMID 7714761.
- Collier, Joe (27 January 2007). "Inside big pharma's box of tricks". British Medical Journal. 334 (7586): 209. doi:10.1136/bmj.39104.771597.59. ISSN 0959-8138. PMC 1781968.
- Collier, Joe (17 June 2006). "The price of independence". BMJ (Clinical Research Ed.). 332 (7555): 1447–1449. doi:10.1136/bmj.332.7555.1447. ISSN 1756-1833. PMC 1479632. PMID 16777892.

=== Books ===
- The Health Conspiracy. Century. 1989. ISBN 978-0-7126-1859-5.
- The Grey Book; Guidelines for the management of common medical emergencies and for the use of antimicrobial drugs. London; St George's University of London, February 2015, 62nd edition.
- In the Fullness of Time: Reflections on Everyday Life. London Press. 2017. ISBN 978-1-905006-11-3.
- As I See It: Further Reflections on Everyday Life. London Press. 2020. ISBN 978-1-905006-68-7.
