= Marine Martin =

French whistleblower in the valproate affair

Marine Martin, born on June 26, 1972, in Toulouse, is a French whistleblower. She is the chairwoman of the French Association ("APESAC"), she is also an expert patient at the ANSM and a member of the college of advisors of the Prescrire journal.

== Biography ==
In 2002, her son was born with birth defects and neurobehavioral disorders. In 2009, she identified a link between the valproate she took during her pregnancy and her son's condition with autism. She subsequently became a whistleblower in the Depakine (Valproic acid) case, a medication prescribed for epilepsy and bipolar disorder.

In 2011, she founded the APESACassociation to inform affected families about the risks, raise awareness among the media and public authorities, advocate for changes in prescribing practices, promote the inclusion of warning pictograms on medication packaging, and support research into the transgenerational effects of Valproate by publishing a study at Birth Defects Research review.

== Positions taken ==
=== Valproate case ===
She initiated civil proceedings against Sanofi in 2012, followed by criminal proceedings in 2015 and filed a claim against the French State before the administrative courts in 2016.

Her association APESAC was the first French health association to initiate a Class Action complaint in 2016. In November of the same year, a compensation scheme specifically dedicated to individuals affected by Valproate was established by the French national agency ONIAM, similar to a mechanism previously implemented for the Mediator case.

In April 2017, she published her book Dépakine, le Scandale: je ne pouvais pas me taire, in which she describes her actions and involvement in the case. In collaboration with epidemiologist Catherine Hill she also contributed to studies estimating the number of people affected by Depakine, based on data collected by APESAC. The book received an award from the journal Prescrire in 2017.

In early 2019, she publicized data collected by her association, APESAC, concerning the potential transgenerational effects of Depakine (Valproate). These data suggested that the children of individuals exposed in utero might present an increased risk of congenital malformations or neurodevelopmental disorders. At the same time, work conducted in collaboration with the French National Agency for the Safety of Medicines and Health Products ANSM contributed to a report published in April 2019, which assessed the risks associated with other antiepileptic drugs during pregnancy.

In February 2020, an investigating judge placed Sanofi under formal investigation on charges including aggravated deception and endangering the lives of others, following a complaint filed by Marine Martin. In August of the same year, the charge of involuntary manslaughter was added after four cases involving deceased children were incorporated into the proceedings.In October 2020, in the same case, the French National Agency for the Safety of Medicines and Health Products ANSM was indicted for endangering the lives of others and involuntary manslaughter. In October 2021, the Paris Court of Appeal's investigating chamber rejected Sanofi's request to annul the proceedings, thereby upholding its formal investigation on charges including aggravated deception, involuntary injury, and involuntary manslaughter.

In December 2021, she co-published a study on the potential transgenerational effects of Valproate in collaboration with international researchers including Catherine Hill, Susan Bewley, professor emeritus of Obstetrics and Women's Health at King's College London, Alastair H. Maclennan, Director of the Cerebral Palsy Research Group at the University of Adelaide and Dr. Alain Braillon.

On January 5, 2022, her association, APESAC, won the first health-related class action in France against SANOFI, which was found responsible for insufficient vigilance and for failing to adequately inform about the risks associated with Valproate. The court also concluded that the company had produced and marketed a defective product.

=== Institutional work ===
In 2014, in collaboration with British counterparts from the Organisation for Anti-convulsant Syndrome (OACS), she contributed to the European re-evaluation of Depakine by the European Medicines Agency EMA, which resulted in the adoption of a monitoring protocol based on that of isotretinoin and modifications to the drug's Summary of Product Characteristics (SPC).

In 2016, she obtained from the French National Agency for the Safety of Medicines and Health Products ANSM the commissioning of studies to determine the number of affected individuals. Three reports were subsequently published: the first estimated that 4,000 children had been born with malformations (2016) the second indicated that between 2007 and 2014, 14,000 women had been pregnant while taking Depakine resulting in 8,700 live births (2016). and the third reported that approximately 30,000 children in France had been born with neurodevelopmental disorders linked to valproate exposure since 1967 (2018).

Also in 2016, she negotiated the placement of warning pictograms on Depakine packaging, as well as on all teratogenic teratogenic drugs, indicating the risks of use during pregnancy. This measure was enacted by French decree in April 2017 and subsequently implemented at the European level in 2018.

She continues to participate in ongoing proceedings related to the case. As a patient expert at the ANSM, she has faced attempts by Sanofi to challenge her appointment, which were rejected by the Administrative Court of Montreuil in May 2021, to have Marine removed from her position as an expert patient.

== Bibliography ==
=== Works ===
- "Dépakine, le scandale. Je ne pouvais pas me taire". lisez.com. 2017
- Enfant Dépakine, 2020

=== Articles ===
- Proposals for Engaging Patients and Healthcare Professionals in Risk Minimisation from an Analysis of Stakeholder Input to the EU Valproate Assessment Using the Novel Analysing Stakeholder Safety Engagement Tool (ASSET), in Drug Safety, July 2021
- Transgenerational adverse effects of valproate? A patient report from 90 affected families in Birth Defects Research, December 2021

== See also ==
- Sanofi
