= Therapeutics Initiative =

Canadian medication evaluation organization

Therapeutics Letter
- Discipline: Medicine, pharmacology
- Language: English

Publication details
- History: 1994-present
- Publisher: Therapeutics initiative (Canada)
- Frequency: Bimonthly

Standard abbreviations
- ISO 4: Ther. Lett.

Indexing
- ISSN: 2369-8683 (print); 2369-8691 (web)

Links
- Journal homepage

The Therapeutics Initiative (TI) is an independent organization at the University of British Columbia (UBC) which researches the effectiveness of medications and provides education to health care providers in British Columbia about the use of medications.

== History ==
The Therapeutics Initiative was founded in 1994 by the British Columbia Ministry of Health. Since 2013, the organization has been managed by the UBC.

When requested it additionally looks at specific medications to generate reports for PharmaCare. These reports are generated without look at costs just medication effects. This is done independently of the pharmaceutical industry and government.

They additionally publish the "Therapeutics Letter" and are part of the International Society of Drug Bulletins.

== Controversy ==
In 2008, a pharmaceutical task force established by the British Columbia government published a report on the Therapeutics Initiative. The task force members included Russell Williams who was then head of Canada’s Research-Based Pharmaceutical Companies (Rx&D) and employees of Angiotech Pharmaceuticals. They recommended closing the TI.

== See also ==
- Prescrire
- National Prescribing Service
