= Lord Stone =

Lord Stone may refer to:

- Andrew Stone, Baron Stone of Blackheath (born 1942), non-affiliated (formerly Labour) politician
- Joseph Stone, Baron Stone (1903–1986), British general practitioner and life peer
