= Andrew Herxheimer =

British clinical pharmacologist (1925–2016)

- Born: 4 November 1925
- Died: 21 February 2016 (aged 90)
- Known for: founded Drug and Therapeutics Bulletin
- Medical career
- Profession: Physician
- Field: Clinical pharmacology
- Institutions: London Hospital and Charing Cross
- Sub-specialties: patient advocacy and consumer advocacy
- Notable works: Database of Individual Patient Experiences

Andrew Herxheimer (4 November 1925 – 21 February 2016) was a British clinical pharmacologist. He was "interested in all aspects of providing independent, unbiased, clear and concise information about therapeutic interventions to professionals and the public, and [had] a long experience of observing the pharmaceutical industry at work". He founded the monthly scientific journal Drug and Therapeutics Bulletin, to better educate medical providers on prescription drugs. After retiring from his academic career at London Hospital and Charing Cross in 1991, he continued his career as a consultant for the Cochrane Collaboration with a focus on adverse drug effects, and as an internationalist in patient advocacy and consumer advocacy.

== Early life and education ==
Andrew Herxheimer was born in Berlin, Germany to Ilse (née Koenig) and Herbert Herxheimer into a secular Jewish family. He fled with his mother and sister Eva in 1938 to join his father in London. His father, a chest physician by training, and sports physiology expert had found a job as a school doctor at Highgate School, North London with the help of Archibald Hill who assisted academic refugees through the Society for the Protection of Science and Learning. Herbert Herxheimer and Hill had met at the 1936 Berlin Olympics. Andrew attended the same school where his father worked, and received a bursary as the great nephew of Karl Herxheimer, who identified the inflammatory reaction to antibiotics named after him. Andrew was secretary of the school's chess club and member of the science society from January 1939 to July 1944. He studied medicine on a scholarship at St Thomas’ Hospital medical school.

== Career, 1949–2016 ==
After graduating in 1949, national service and junior hospital jobs Herxheimer lectured at St Thomas's Hospital from 1953 to 1958, from 1959 to 1976 at London Hospital and the Charing Cross and Westminster Hospital Medical College. From 1966 to 1973 he served on the British National Formulary Committee and was extraordinary professor of clinical pharmacology in Groningen, the Netherlands, from 1968 to 1977. In 1991 he retired from consulting at the Charing Cross.

He became a consultant for the Cochrane Centre in Oxford, which Iain Chalmers had founded in 1993, asking for Herxheimer's help to establish the Cochrane Collaboration. Herxheimer argued for the Collaboration "to take more seriously the adverse effects of drugs and other treatments".

He was a member of a team that created "readable leaflets in medicine packs", the Medicine Labelling Group which existed from 1998 to 2009. He published peer reviewed articles up until his death.

Herxheimer served as an expert witness for both patients, including prisoners whom he visited into his 80s, and to Parliament. He was a patient advocate and consumer advocate when detailing "how the drugs industry oversold the beneficial effects of its products while downplaying the harms" to the parliamentary select committee on health.

== Achievements ==
Working at London Hospital, Herxheimer found that prescribers needed to be better informed. Inspired by The Medical Letter on Drugs and Therapeutics when working in the USA in the 1960s he founded Drug and Therapeutics Bulletin (DTB) as a UK equivalent, sent to prescribing doctors, but free of charge. Initially it was published by the UK's The Consumers' Association and later by the Department of Health. "The journal's forthright statements of opinion on the benefit or otherwise of medicines often aroused the irritation of the drug industry, and occasional threats to sue." Each article undergoes unusually intense peer review by 20–30 people, including industry, and is published anonymously. One observer has credited the existence of the National Institute for Health and Care Excellence (NICE) as "[coming] from what the DTB was trying to do".

His second achievement was the creation of the Database of Individual Patient Experiences (DIPEx) with GP Ann McPherson, collecting peoples' stories, patients' experiences to benefit other patients and physicians to find out about patients' perspectives. DIPEx has been supporting two websites, healthtalk.org and youthhealthtalk.org, which disseminate medical sociology research into patients' experiences by the Health Experiences Research Group of the University of Oxford. As of February 2016 the method has become part of an International project used in 14 countries, and covers 90 conditions.

He enjoyed working internationally, founding the clinical pharmacology department at the University of Groningen in the Netherlands, consulting for the World Health Organisation, chairing both the International Society of Drug Bulletins from its foundation in 1986 until 1996, and Consumers International's health working group.

== Personal life ==
Herxheimer was married twice, first to textile designer Susan Collier, with whom he had two daughters Charlotte and Sophie. After a divorce he married Christine Bernecker, a psychiatrist and analyst in 1983.

Herxheimer was fluent in German, Dutch and French.

Herxheimer was hospitalised for a mild heart attack in February 2016. His wife said "Andrew was so determined to lead a useful life that even when he was in the Royal Free hospital [...] he was handing out leaflets on healthtalk. And he was editing up until the day before he died." He died of a stroke on 21 February 2016.
