= ISDB (disambiguation) =

ISDB may refer to:

- Idaho School for the Deaf and the Blind
- Integrated Services Digital Broadcasting (ISDB)
- International Society of Developmental Biologists
- Islamic Development Bank (IsDB)
- International Society of Drug Bulletins
