= Sarah Campbell =

Sarah or Sara Campbell may refer to:

- Sarah Campbell Blaffer (1885–1975), American philanthropist
- Sarah K. Campbell (born 1982), American attorney, justice of the Tennessee Supreme Court
- Sarah Campbell (designer), British textile designer
- Sarah Campbell (politician) (born 1982), Canadian politician, member of the Ontario Provincial Parliament
- Sara Campbell, British freediver
- Sarah Campbell, fictional character in the TV series Secrets of Sulphur Springs

== See also ==
- Campbell (surname)#Notable persons named Campbell
