= St George's, University of London =

Public medical school in London, England

- St George's Hospital Medical School
- Type: Public medical school
- Active: 1834–2024
- Parent institution: University of London
- Affiliations: United Hospitals; Universities UK
- Endowment: £5.8 million (2022)
- Budget: £87.8 million (2021–22)
- Students: n/a (2024/25)
- Undergraduates: n/a (2024/25)
- Postgraduates: n/a (2024/25)
- Location: Tooting, London, England; 51°25′37″N 0°10′29″W
- Campus: Urban
- Colours: Blue and blue (Institution); Green and gold (Students' Union)
- Website: sgul.ac.uk

St George's, University of London (SGUL), legally the St George's Hospital Medical School, was a public university and medical school in South London, England. It was established in 1834 as part of St George's Hospital, which has its origins in 1733 and began formal registration of trainee doctors in 1751. St George's has been affiliated with the University of London since 1838. In 2024, the university merged with City, University of London to form City St George's, University of London.

St George's is closely affiliated to St George's Hospital and is one of the United Hospitals.

== History ==
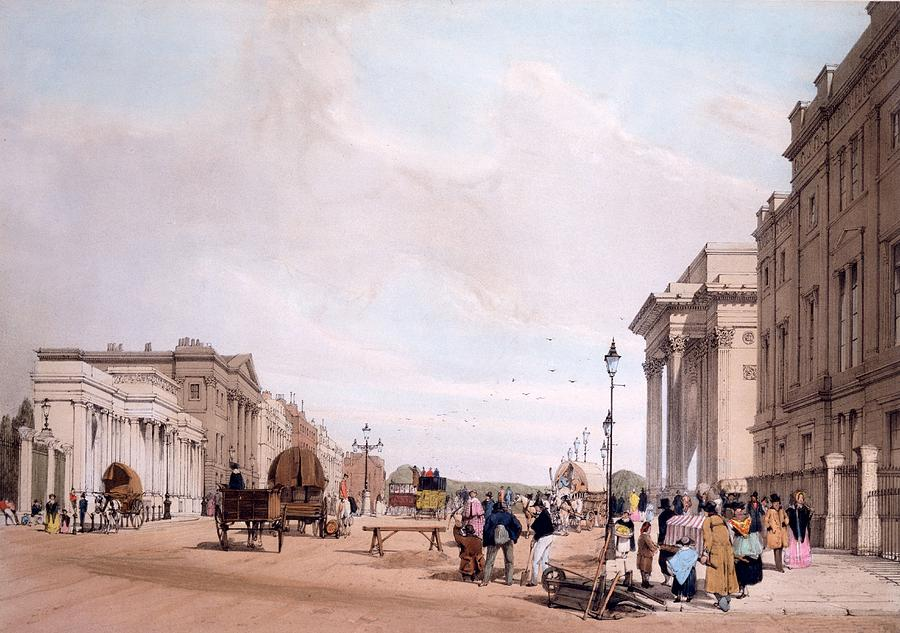
Hyde Park Corner in 1842

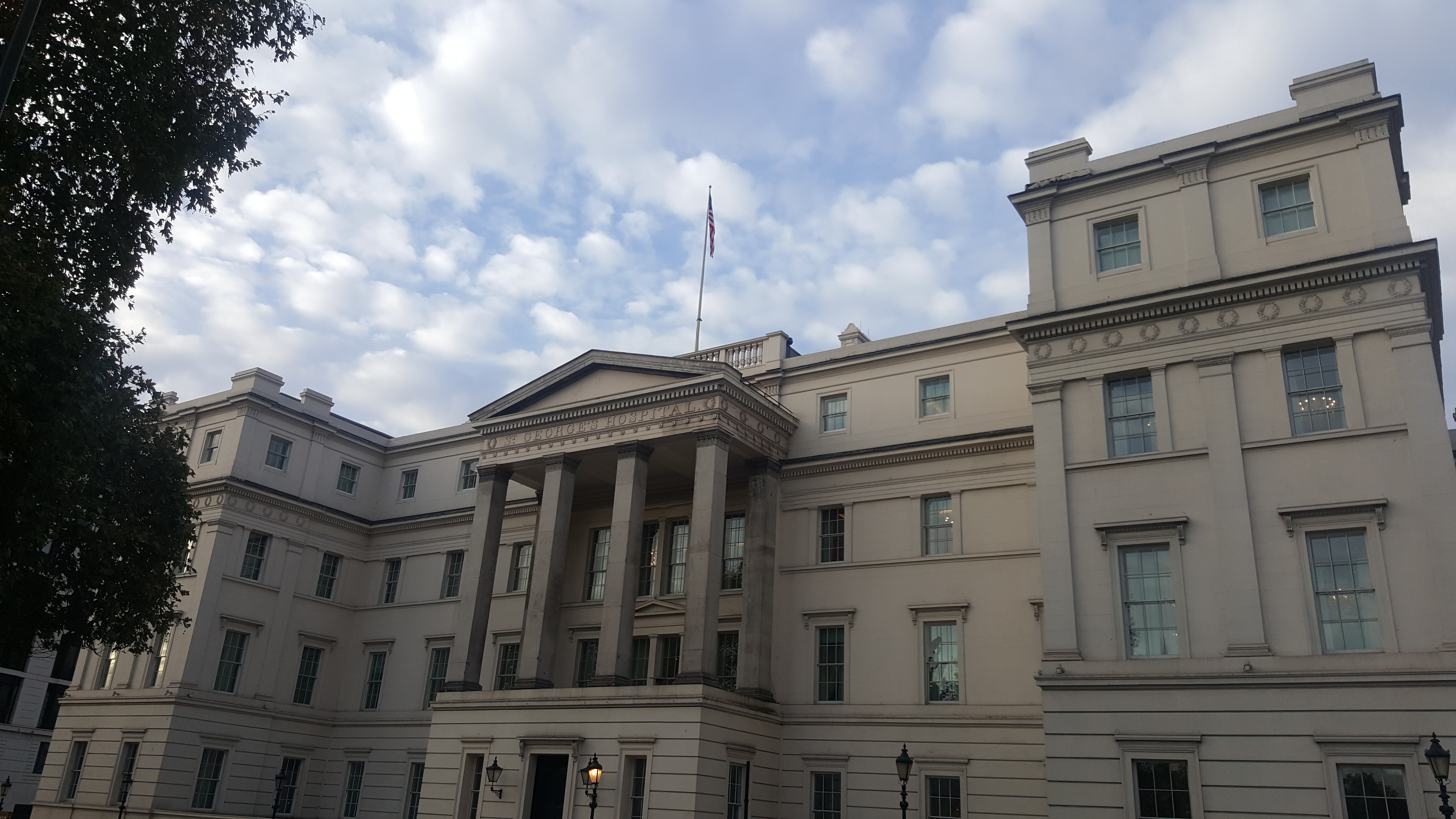
Former St George's Hospital

St George's Hospital Medical School was originally established in 1834 as part of St George's Hospital at Hyde Park Corner (now the site of The Lanesborough hotel), in central London. The medical school was relocated, together with St George's Hospital to Tooting, South London in 1980. A joint faculty with Kingston University, the Faculty of Health and Social Care Sciences, has increased the variety of allied healthcare courses offered at St George's, including Nursing, Physiotherapy, Paramedic Science and Radiography.

St George's was the first institution in the United Kingdom to offer a four-year graduate entry Medicine degree based on the programme from Flinders University, with which it has an exchange programme. The first intake was in 2000 with 35 students and the course has since been emulated by many other universities. Entry to the course is highly competitive with candidates being required to sit the GAMSAT as part of the application process.

In 2008, St George's announced that it planned to merge with Royal Holloway to form a single institution within the University of London. The merger was called off in a joint statement by the two colleges' principals on 25 September 2009. St George's intends to keep working with Royal Holloway in the field of health and social care along with its well-established Joint Faculty with Kingston University. St George's, Kingston University and Royal Holloway will continue to collaborate in the field of health and social care as part of the existing SWan (South West London Academic Network) healthcare alliance.

In 2021 merger talks between Royal Holloway and St George’s were reignited after over a decade. The merger was, once again, called off in a joint statement by the two Principals in December 2021.

In 2023, a merger was proposed between St George's and City, University of London. It was confirmed in February 2024 that this merger would be going ahead, with the new institution to be named City St George's, University of London.

=== 1980s student applications controversy ===
In December 1986, it was discovered that a computer program used to process student applications at St. George's, written by Dr Geoffrey T. Franglen in 1979, had discriminated against non-Caucasians and female candidates by deliberately reducing their likelihood of being offered an interview. A Commission for Racial Equality inquiry found that this unfairly deprived 60 candidates a year, as well as finding that various senior academics were aware that the program was discriminatory several times between 1982 and 1986.

== Campus ==
The St George's University of London campus is located in the Tooting area of south-west London, and is co-located with St George's Hospital, a 1,300 bed major trauma centre.

Teaching facilities at the campus include clinical skills laboratories and a simulation suite allowing students to practice based on real-life situations including surgical and medical emergencies. The university library houses approximately 42,000 books and subscribes to over 10,000 journals.

The Rob Lowe Sports Centre located at the St George's Hospital grounds provides sporting facilities to students and staff, including a sports hall, three squash courts, and weights and fitness rooms.

== Courses ==
Rankings
National rankings
- Complete (2027): 69
- Times / Sunday Times (2027): 69

Global rankings
- ARWU (2026): 701–800
- THE (2026): 301–350

UCAS Admission Statistics
	2022	2021	2020	2019	2018
Applications (Note: Main scheme applications, International and UK)	8,875	9,500	6,020	5,940	5,825
Accepted	1,065	1,050	935	980	835
Applications/Accepted Ratio	8.3	9.0	6.4	6.1	7.0
Offer Rate (%) (Note: UK domiciled applicants)	40.0	35.3	38.7	39.0	37.8
Average Entry Tariff	—N/a	149	145	147	154

St George's offers foundation and undergraduate degrees at its site in Tooting in medical, biomedical and healthcare sciences, including: Biomedical Science BSc (Hons), Biomedical Science Foundation Degree, Healthcare Practice DipHE and BSc (Hons), Healthcare Practice Foundation Degree, Healthcare Science (Physiological Sciences) BSc (Hons), Clinical Pharmacology BSc (Hons), Medicine (four-year graduate stream) MBBS4, Medicine (five-year) MBBS5, and Medicine (six-year) MBBS6, Physician Associate Studies MSc.

In partnership with Kingston University, the joint Faculty of Health and Social Care Sciences also offers degrees in physiotherapy, occupational therapy, paramedic science, nursing, midwifery, social work and diagnostic or therapeutic radiography.

St George's, in partnership with INTO University Partners, has also formed a joint venture, INTO SGUL, to offer a Foundation in Medical, Biomedical and Health Sciences for international students whose qualifications do not allow direct progression into Bachelors level study in the UK, and a six-year MBBS and a four-year graduate stream MBBS programme specifically for international students, with clinical placements overseas. The first student cohort on each international MBBS programme entered St George's in September 2012.

Outside of the UK, the MBBS4 is also offered in Nicosia, Cyprus, through a partnership between St George's and the University of Nicosia. The new programme was inaugurated and the first student cohort commenced in Nicosia in September 2011. The programme at the University of Nicosia features international clinical placements in Israel and the United States.

St George's also offers numerous research and taught postgraduate degrees.

== Teaching ==
St George's uses the integrated approach which involves the use of both Case Based Learning (CBL), Problem Based Learning (PBL) and a traditional style of learning with the use of lectures and tutorials. The degree of PBL used in teaching varies between courses, for example, being a major part of the Medicine (Graduate Entry) course but not prominently within the Biomedical Sciences curriculum. Anatomy is taught at St George's through prosections and practical within the dissecting room, with anatomical dissection being optional as part of the Summer Dissection Programme.

In the medical curriculum, preclinical teaching (first and second year in the undergraduate stream, and first year in the graduate stream) is largely based on lectures and tutorials held at the St George's campus, with a few weeks worth of attachments to various hospital departments. The third year of the undergraduate stream and second year of the graduate stream, also known as Transitional (T) year, comprises three blocks of PBL with lectures and tutorials and three blocks of clinical placements in medicine, surgery and general practice. Subsequent clinical years of either course are spent on clinical placements of various specialities, with teaching occurring as lecture weeks prior to each placement block, or teaching which occurs at hospital sites led by clinical staff.

Clinical placements for students on Medical degrees are mainly at St. George's Hospital, and at other sites such as Kingston Hospital, Croydon University Hospital, St Helier Hospital and Epsom General Hospital. Other further sites, such as Frimley Park Hospital, St Peter's Hospital and Margate Hospital are sites for placements during the later years of medical school.

== Student life ==
The St George's Students' Union (SGSU) organises various activities including fancy dress discos and a Rag Week, the annual series of fund-raising events. In recent years the Union has become more politically aware and shown greater interest in National Union of Students and British Medical Association activities.

St George's enters a team into the British television quiz programme University Challenge each year and has previously excelled through the competition.

There are several societies run by students at St George's focussed on several different aspects of academia, ranging from the Henry Gray Anatomical Society, St George's Surgical Society, Clinical Neuroscience Society, Cardiology Society and Paediatrics Society. Several clubs and societies cater to different segments of the student population, including cultural groups such as the Association of Chinese and British University Students (ABACUS), Afro-Caribbean Society or Arab Society. Religious groups include the Islamic Society and the Christian Union.

Many student groups at St George's produce yearly performances, mostly focused on dancing and singing. Some of these groups include the Diwali Show, Fashion Show, Tooting Show, St George's Revue, and the Musical Society.

=== Sports clubs ===
St. George's Hospital Medical School RFC is one of the oldest rugby clubs in the world having been founded in 1863.

St George's also has a number of other sports clubs including Muay Thai, swimming, rowing, cheerleading, volleyball, fencing, football, netball, hockey, and many others and participates in various competitions. As St George's is a member of the United Hospitals, the teams also compete in separate competitions with the five other medical schools within the University of London and that of Imperial College.

=== Halls of residence ===
The university runs a hall of residence, Horton Halls, a large modern site which first opened to new students in late September 2007, replacing St. George's Grove the old hall of residence.

== Notable people ==
=== Notable alumni ===
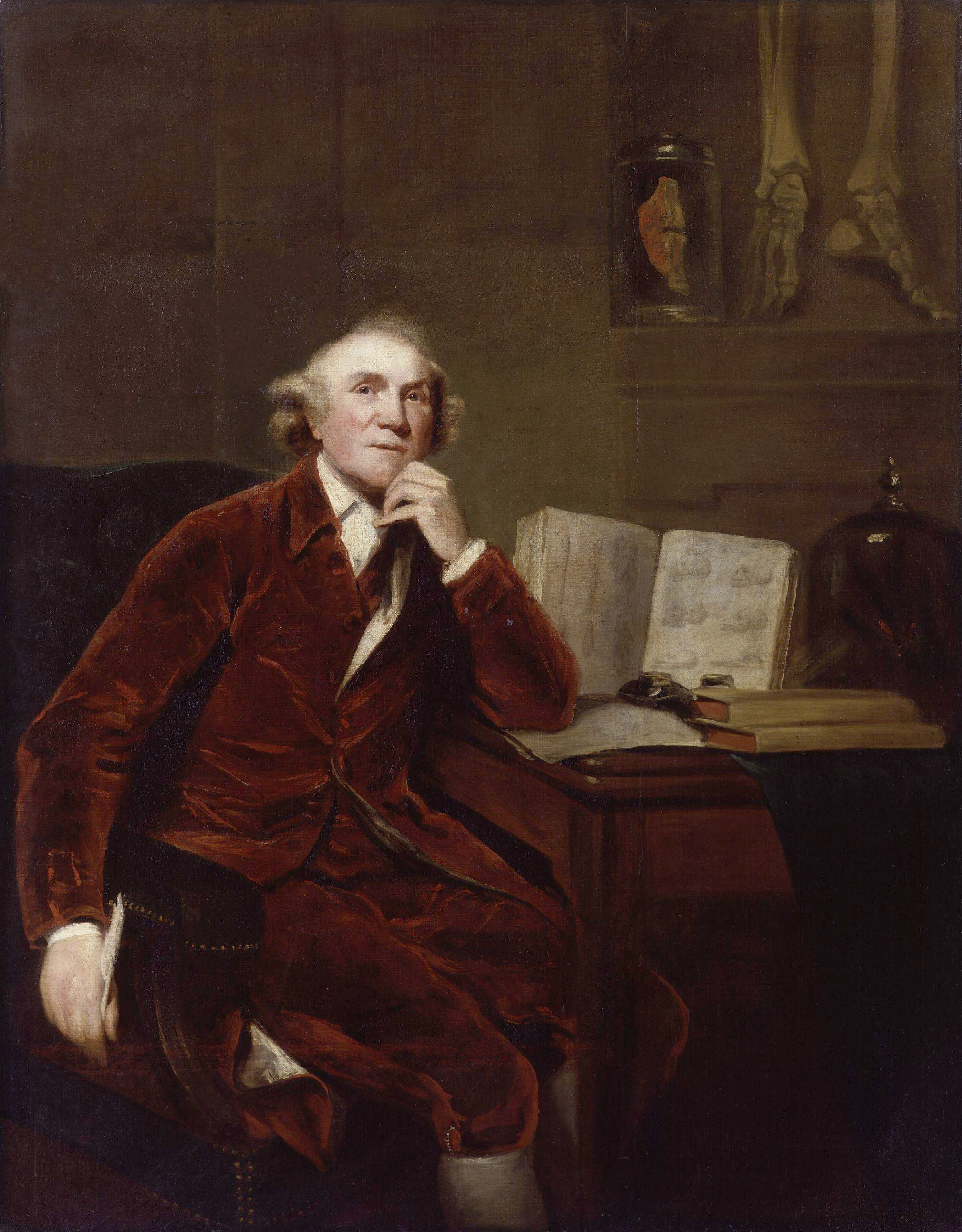
John Hunter

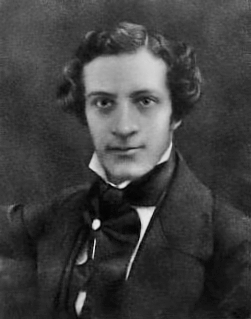
Henry Gray

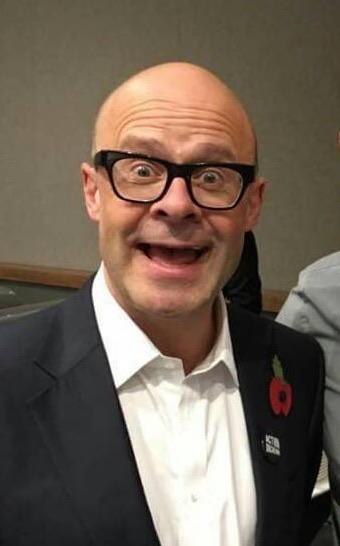
Harry Hill

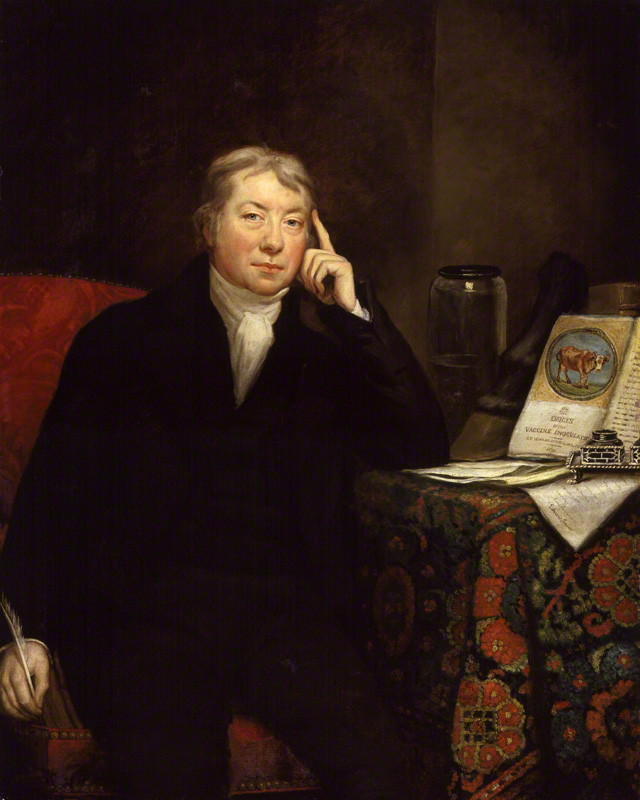
Edward Jenner

Notable alumni of St George's include:

- J. K. Acquaye (1940), Professor of Haematology, president of the West African College of Physicians (2003–2004)
- Joseph Adams (1756–1818), English physician and surgeon
- Sir Benjamin Collins Brodie (1783–1862), English physiologist and surgeon who pioneered research into bone and joint disease
- Henry Vandyke Carter (1831–1897), English anatomist, surgeon, and anatomical artist most notable for his illustrations of the book, Gray's Anatomy
- Walter Butler Cheadle (1836–1910), English paediatrician
- Sir Francis Darwin (1848–1925), botanist
- Sir John William Fisher (1788–1876), English surgeon
- Sir Claude Frankau (1883-1967), English surgeon
- Henry Gray (1827–1861), English anatomist and surgeon most notable for publishing the book Gray's Anatomy
- Harry Hill (born 1964), English BAFTA Award–winning comedian, author and television presenter
- John Hunter (1728–1793), Scottish surgeon and anatomist
- William Hunter (1718–1783), Scottish anatomist and physician
- Edward Jenner (1749–1823), English scientist and the first doctor to introduce and study the smallpox vaccine
- Nik Johnson (born 1969), former Mayor of Cambridgeshire and Peterborough
- Henry Bence Jones (1813–1873), English physician, described Bence Jones protein
- Sir Francis Laking (1847–1914), Surgeon-Apothecary to Queen Victoria, Physician in Ordinary to King Edward VII and George V
- Christine Lee (born 1943), emeritus professor of haemophilia in the University of London
- Henry Marsh (born 1950), English neurosurgeon
- Caroline Moore, UK's first woman Professor of Urology, University College London
- George Pearson (1751–1858), physician, chemist and early advocate of Jenner's cowpox vaccination
- Paul Sinha (born 1970), Rose D'Or winning broadcaster and stand-up comedian
- Mike Stroud (born 1955), English physician and eminent explorer
- Patrick Steptoe (1913–1988), English obstetrician, gynaecologist and pioneer of fertility treatment. Responsible for developing in vitro fertilisation
- Lord Vallance (born 1960), former Government Chief Scientific Adviser (GCSA) and Head of the Government Science and Engineering (GSE) profession, later Minster for Science
- David Webb (born 1953), clinical vice-president, British Pharmacological Society; vice-president, Royal College of Physicians of Edinburgh
- Edward Wilson (1872–1912), English polar explorer, physician, naturalist, painter and ornithologist
- Mike Wozniak (born 1979), British comedian, writer and actor

=== Principals and deans ===
- Alastair Hunter (1956 to 1971)
- Robert Lowe (1971 to 1982)
- Richard J West (1982 to 1987)
- Sir William Asscher (1988 to 1996)
- Sir Robert Boyd (1996 to 2003)
- Michael Farthing (2003 to 2007)
- Peter Kopelman (2008 to 2015)
- Jenny Higham (since 2015)
