= Decline and Fall... of a Birdwatcher =

1968 British film by John Krish

- Theatrical release poster
- Directed by: John Krish
- Written by: Ivan Foxwell; Alan Hackney; Hugh Whitemore
- Based on: Decline and Fall; 1928 novel by Evelyn Waugh
- Produced by: Ivan Foxwell
- Starring: Robin Phillips; Donald Wolfit; Geneviève Page; Felix Aylmer; Colin Blakely
- Cinematography: Desmond Dickinson
- Edited by: Archie Ludski
- Music by: Ron Goodwin
- Production company: Ivan Foxwell Productions
- Distributed by: Twentieth Century Fox Film Corporation
- Release dates: 25 September 1968 (London); 26 January 1969 (United States)
- Running time: 113 minutes
- Country: UK
- Language: English
- Budget: $1,970,000

Decline and Fall... of a Birdwatcher (also known as Decline and Fall) is a 1968 British comedy film directed by John Krish and starring Robin Phillips, Geneviève Page and Donald Wolfit. It was adapted by Ivan Foxwell, Alan Hackney and Hugh Whitemore from the 1928 novel Decline and Fall by Evelyn Waugh.

It was the final film role for Wolfit.

== Plot summary ==
Paul Pennyfeather is an Oxford divinity student who finds himself sent down after a group of drunken undergraduates remove his trousers and he is accused of exposing himself.

Forced to look for work, he seeks the services of an employment agency who secure for him a position at a sleazy Welsh boys' boarding school, presided over by the colourful Dr. Fagan.

The school's staff are an assortment of eccentric characters: Mr Prendergast, a withdrawn former clergyman; Captain Grimes, a one-legged philanderer with his eye on Fagan's daughter; and Solomon Philbrick, an undercover criminal posing as Fagan's butler. Paul, who tutors Peter Beste-Chetwynde, is enchanted at the school’s annual sports by the boy’s rich mother. Peter thinks Paul her perfect husband so invites him to vacation at their country home. The two are taken with each other but on the day of their wedding, Paul lands in prison for his inadvertent role in her tawdry business deals. There he runs across everyone from his school days, only to be sprung and sent back into the world by the powerful husband she’s married in his absence.

== Cast ==
- Robin Phillips as Paul Pennyfeather
- Donald Wolfit as Doctor Augustus Fagan
- Geneviève Page as Margot Beste-Chetwynde
- Colin Blakely as Solomon Philbrick
- Felix Aylmer as Judge
- Robert Harris as Prendergast
- Leo McKern as Captain Grimes
- Patrick Magee as lunatic prisoner
- Donald Sinden as prison governor
- Griffith Jones as Sir Humphrey Maltravers
- Paul Rogers as Chief Warder
- Rodney Bewes as Arthur Potts
- Patience Collier as Flossie Fagan
- Kenneth Griffith as Mr Church
- Joan Sterndale-Bennett as Lady Circumference
- David McAlister as Peter Beste-Chetwynde
- Michael Elwyn as Alastair Digby-Vane-Trumpington
- Victor Maddern as 1st warder
- Kenneth J. Warren as 2nd warder
- Duncan Lamont as Police Inspector
- Michael Newport as Lord Tangent
- Rodney Bewes as Potts
- Roland Curram as Otto Silenus
- Jack Watson as gallery warder
- Helen Christie as Mrs. Clutterbuck
- Jonathan Collins as Clutterbuck
- Clifton Jones as Chokey
- Michael Nightingale as Colonel Clutterbuck

== Production ==
The film was made with a budget of $1,970,000.

== Reception ==
=== Box office ===
According to Fox records the film required $3,100,000 in rentals to break even and by 11 December 1970 had made $1,475,000 so made a loss to the studio.

=== Critical ===
The Monthly Film Bulletin wrote: "John Krish has directed a fast-moving and funny Decline and Fall with enough familiar faces to ensure its commercial success. But unfortunately, in adapting Waugh's novel, Ivan Foxwell has taken too literally the author's claim that it belongs to no particular period, and has set Waugh's sharply observed comedy of manners in the present day. Though the scenes in the Dickensian school and in the futuristic King's Thursday retain – thanks to Jonathan Barry's inventive sets – most of their outrageous charm, the characters fare less happily: abstracted into the 1960s and uprooted from any recognisable social setting, they are relegated from the realms of satire into those of farce. ...The answer is perhaps to forget about the novel and simply enjoy the acting. ... Carry On Countess might have been a better title, but on its own level the film is enough of a success to make it worth seeing."

The Radio Times Guide to Films gave the film 1/5 stars, writing: "Ex-documentary director John Krish has a stab at Evelyn Waugh's partly autobiographical 1928 work, Decline and Fall. It was a vainglorious attempt, as the joys of this hilarious comedy of upper-class manners lie solely on the page; neither Krish nor his trio of scriptwriters have the satirical wit or irreverent verve to translate them to the screen. They are not helped by Robin Phillips's ghastly performance."

Leslie Halliwell said: "Flabby, doomed attempt to film a satirical classic which lives only on the printed page. Odd moments amuse."
