= Crescent Moon (The Avengers) =

- The Avengers episode
- Episode no.: Season 1 Episode 5
- Directed by: John Knight
- Written by: Geoffrey Bellman and John Whitney (teleplay)
- Production code: 3369
- Original air date: 4 February 1961

Guest appearances
- Patience Collier; Roger Delgado; Harold Kasket; Bandana Das Gupta

Episode chronology
← Previous "Nightmare"	Next → "Girl on the Trapeze"

"Crescent Moon" is the fifth episode of the first series of the 1960s British spy-fi television series The Avengers, starring Ian Hendry, Patrick Macnee and Ingrid Hafner, and guest starring Patience Collier, Roger Delgado, Harold Kasket, and Bandana Das Gupta. It was performed and aired live on ABC on 4 February 1961, and is one of many Season 1 episodes that as of 2025 is considered lost. The episode was directed by John Knight, and written by Geoffrey Bellman and John Whitney.

== Plot ==
A foreign general, General Mendoza, fakes his own death in the belief his wife and associate are plotting to kill him and inherit his fortune. He leaves his country and allows his daughter to be kidnapped, believing that it is in her best interest to be kept out of harm's way. However, it turns out that his daughter has been genuinely kidnapped and must be rescued by Steed while the General is in London recovering under Dr. Keel.

== Cast ==
- Ian Hendry as Dr. David Keel
- Patrick Macnee as John Steed
- Nicholas Amer as Luis Alvarez
- Patience Collier as Senora Mendoza
- Bandana Das Gupta as Carmelita Mendoza
- Roger Delgado as Vasco
- Harold Kasket as Bartello
- George Roderick as Carlos, an Officer
- Jack Rodney as Fernandez
- Eric Thompson as Paul

== Production ==
The episode was broadcast live on ABC on 4 February 1961. The production set was designed by Alpho O'Reilly.
