= Broome Stages (TV series) =

- Genre: Drama
- Based on: Broome Stages by Clemence Dane
- Written by: Michael Barry
- Directed by: Michael Barry
- Starring: Gwen Watford; Richard Pasco; Robin Phillips
- Country of origin: United Kingdom
- Original language: English
- No. of series: 1
- No. of episodes: 8

Production
- Producer: Michael Barry
- Running time: 45 minutes

Original release
- Network: BBC 2
- Release: 25 October – 13 December 1966

Broome Stages is a 1966 British television series that originally aired on BBC 2 in eight episodes in 1966. It is based on the 1931 novel of the same title by Clemence Dane portraying the two hundred year history of a theatrical dynasty.

== Main cast ==
- Gwen Watford as Lettice Broome
- Richard Pasco as Lord Lionel Wybird
- Robin Phillips as Robin Broome
- Paul Daneman as Harry Broome
- Emrys James as Morgan
- Betty Cooper as Lady Rosina
- Will Leighton as Throgmorton
- Anthony Bate as William Broome
- Margaret Diamond as Mitcham
- Fionnula Flanagan as Maud
- George Little as Browntree
- Anna Barry as Donna Broome
- Stafford Byrne as Mr Parkinson
- Ian Colin as Russel Broome
- Michael Deacon as Stephen Broome
- John Gatrell as George, Duke of Bedenham
- Cavan Kendall as Russel Broome
- Ralph Michael as Sir Joscelyn Pallas
- Andrew Robertson as Bill Seller
- Terry Scully as Harlequin and Iago
- Geoffrey Staines as Dr Burton
- Marda Vanne as Mrs Reilly

== Bibliography ==
- Baskin, Ellen . Serials on British Television, 1950-1994. Scolar Press, 1996.
