= Vivo Capital =

American Healthcare investment firm

Vivo Capital, LLC
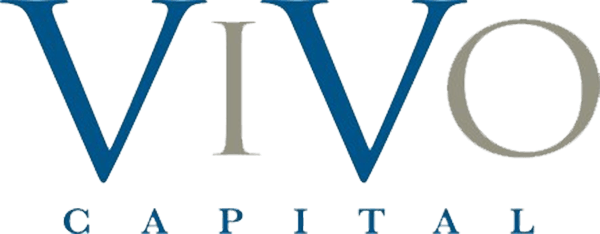
- Formerly: BioAsia Investments
- Type: Private
- Industry: Investment management
- Founded: 1996; 30 years ago
- Founders: Frank Kung; Edgar G. Engleman
- Headquarters: Palo Alto, California, U.S.
- Products: Hedge fund Venture capital Private equity
- AUM: US$5.3 billion (March 2025)
- Number of employees: 73 (March 2023)
- Website: www.vivocapital.com

Vivo Capital ("Vivo") is an American investment firm headquartered in Palo Alto, California. It is focused on making public and private investments in the healthcare and biotechnology industries.

== Background ==
The firm was originally founded in 1996 as BioAsia Investments (due to its former association with Asian investors) by Frank Kung and Edgar G. Engleman. The two had previously founded Genelabs Technologies, a biopharmaceutical company that was acquired by GSK plc in 2008.

Vivo has three strategies, Private equity, Public equity and Venture capital. Vivo historically has invested 70% of its capital into biotechnology companies and 30% into medical device companies. Originally it started investing in early stage companies but later on more towards growth stage companies and buyout deals. In the early 2000s, it started investing in Asia, mainly in China due to the opportunities provided. The biotech firms that Vivo invests in tend to already have new treatments in clinical trials with human experimental data and case studies available. However Vivo still invests in companies at all stages.

Vivo has funded Sinovac Biotech, a Chinese biopharmaceutical company that developed the COVID-19 vaccine, CoronaVac. Other notable companies it has invested in include WuXi AppTec, Amyris, Angiotech Pharmaceuticals and Precision BioSciences.

Vivo headquartered in Palo Alto, California with additional offices in Beijing, Hong Kong, Shanghai and Taipei.
