= Gwen Watford =

English actress (1927–1994)

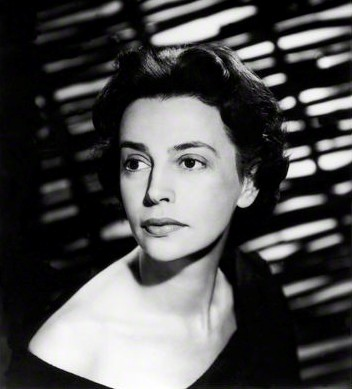
- Watford (unknown year)
- Born: Gwendoline Watford; 10 September 1927; London, England
- Died: 6 February 1994 (aged 66); London, England
- Occupation: Actress
- Spouse: Richard Bebb (m. 1952)

Gwendoline Watford (10 September 1927 – 6 February 1994), professionally known after the mid-1950s as Gwen Watford, (Note: Watford is credited as Gwendoline in reviews and other press mentions up to early 1957, after which she generally used the shorter form of her given name.) was an English actress.

Watford's talent was spotted by John Gielgud while she was still a schoolgirl. With his help, she made her professional London debut in 1945. From then until her death, she pursued a parallel career on stage and on television. She played a wide range of roles, from Shakespeare and Shaw to new works by playwrights including Willis Hall, David Hare, Hugh Leonard and David Mercer. For the BBC and ITV, she appeared frequently from the mid-1950s onwards, and was dubbed one of British television's two leading ladies. She twice won the Society of Film and Television Arts's award (now the BAFTA award) for best television actress. Although she appeared in several cinema films, including Cleopatra, she remained chiefly known as a stage and television performer.

In later years Watford appeared in more comedy than in her earlier career, including the television series Don't Forget to Write! and in the West End Noël Coward's Present Laughter, for which she won a Society of West End Theatre Award in 1981. The last years of her career were curtailed by ill health, and she died aged 66.

== Early years ==
Watford was born in London, the third of three children of Percy Charles Watford and his wife Elizabeth, née Cooper. Percy Watford had been a non-commissioned officer in the First World War. Afterward he became the owner of a public house at St Leonards-on-Sea, Sussex. Gwendoline was educated at the Orchard School in that town. She had ambitions to become a concert pianist but, after being advised by an expert that a career as a soloist was beyond her talents, she turned to drama, with the encouragement of her headmistress. John Gielgud saw her in a school play in November 1943, and was impressed. When she left school, he helped her in the early stages of her theatrical career, took a continued interest in her progress, and remained a lifelong friend.

Watford made her first professional appearance at the White Rock Theatre, Hastings in March 1944, as Florrie in the comedy Once A Gentleman. Her London debut was the following year: on Gielgud's recommendation Anthony Hawtrey engaged her to play Fenny, the romantic lead, in Dodie Smith's comedy Dear Octopus at the Embassy Theatre. In the West End, she appeared at the Winter Garden in May 1946 as Judith Drave in the long-running drama No Room at the Inn, and the St Martin's Theatre in January 1950 as Jennifer in Kenneth Horne's comedy A Lady Mislaid.

Out of London she played in repertory with a succession of provincial companies, in Buxton, Croydon, Watford, Salisbury, Hornchurch and Coventry. Among the leading parts she played in repertory productions were Shaw's Saint Joan and Blanche DuBois in Tennessee Williams's A Streetcar Named Desire. While playing in Buxton she met the actor Richard Bebb, whom she married in 1952. They had two sons.

In 1955 Watford returned to the West End in a production of Ugo Betti's The Queen and the Rebels, transferred from Coventry to the Haymarket Theatre. This was her last stage appearance in London for nearly three years, as television began to dominate her career.

== First screen roles ==
Watford made her film debut playing Lady Usher in The Fall of the House of Usher (1950), but as her obituarist in The Times put it, "the cinema was never really her medium". She became best known for her roles on stage and on television. The first of the latter came in 1956 when she was cast as the Virgin Mary in BBC Television's eight-part dramatisation of the life of Christ, Jesus of Nazareth. (Note: The BBC spelled her name "Gwendolyn Watford" in the credits for the series. From 1957 she began to be generally billed as Gwen rather than Gwendoline.) For the BBC and the commercial ITV network, Watford appeared over the next four years in new drama and adaptations of classics. Her roles in the latter included Rosa Dartle in David Copperfield, Catherine Winslow in The Winslow Boy and Mrs Arbuthnot in A Woman of No Importance. Among the new plays in which she starred on television was a 1958 piece by Clemence Dane, celebrating the 400th anniversary of the accession of Elizabeth I, of which the reviewer in The Daily Telegraph wrote:

All the complexities of the Queen herself – gaiety, shrewdness, hard mind and devotion – were beautifully bodied forth by Gwen Watford, who in this part placed herself in the thin front rank of television actresses.

The Times said of this period that Watford and Billie Whitelaw were the two leading ladies of British television. In Watford's early television career, she starred in new works by writers including Willis Hall, David Hare, Hugh Leonard and David Mercer. In 1959 she was voted best television actress in the Society of Film and Television Arts's awards (now the BAFTA awards). Her sole West End appearance during the late 1950s was at the Westminster Theatre in January 1959, playing Jane Pringle in a thriller, The Woman on the Stair.

Joining the Old Vic company in London for the 1960–61 season, Watford began with the title role in Friedrich Schiller's Mary Stuart, which she had played at the Bristol Old Vic earlier in the year. (Note: The London production was adapted for television, with Watford in the title role, in 1961.) Her next role with the London company was Titania in A Midsummer Night's Dream to the Oberon of Alec McCowen; The Times thought her "enchanting", but the cast won higher praise than the production, which was thought prosaic. Her third and final role in the Old Vic season was Lady Percy in Henry IV, Part 1. Theatre critics expressed hopes that she might be seen more often on stage in addition to her numerous television roles, but another five years elapsed before she appeared again in a London theatre.

== 1961–1970 ==
Throughout the decade Watford appeared continually on television in one-off new dramas, series and adaptations of classics. In the last of these categories she starred as Elizabeth Moulton-Barrett in The Barretts of Wimpole Street, Lettice in Broome Stages and Lea Markat in Somerset Maugham's The Alien Corn. In one-off dramas she appeared in many episodes of Armchair Theatre, ITV Sunday Night Theatre and ITV Play of the Week; in the BBC's The Wednesday Play slot, she played Monica in David Mercer's Let's Murder Vivaldi. She was again named as best television actress by the Society of Film and Television Arts in 1966. In addition to her television performances, Watford was frequently heard on BBC radio in the 1960s; her many roles included Marya Pavlovna in Turgenev's A Quiet Backwater, Sibyl Railton-Bell in Separate Tables, the title role in Ann Veronica, Angèle in Feydeau's farce A Close Shave, and Isabelle Rimbaud in Hampton's Total Eclipse. For the cinema she played supporting roles in The Very Edge, Cleopatra (both 1963) and Valley of the Kings (1964), and had a leading part in Do You Know This Voice? (1964).

Watford was seen on the London stage in three productions during the decade. In June 1966 at the Royal Court Theatre, and later the Comedy Theatre, she played Mrs Evans in When Did You Last See My Mother? by Christopher Hampton. The delicacy of her performance as the mother in a triangular relationship with her gay son's partner caused the critic J. C. Trewin to "congratulat[e] Miss Watford on the really moving restraint of a portrait that makes the night worth while". She recreated the role the following year for BBC radio. She played Margaret Schlegel in Lance Sieveking's adaptation of E. M. Forster's Howards End at the New Theatre in 1967. The critics found the adaptation poor, and Watford received mixed notices, rating her from excellent and the best actress in the cast to charming but shallow. Her last West End role of the 1960s was Violet Seedy in Come Sunday, half of a double-bill that ran briefly at the Fortune Theatre in October 1968.

== 1971–1980 ==
In 1971 Watford toured in a revival of Maugham's The Constant Wife. The following year she was a founder-member of Robin Phillips's Company Theatre group, based at Greenwich Theatre; fellow members included Jeremy Brett, Charles Dance, Mia Farrow, Penelope Keith and Joan Plowright. In the company's opening production, Chekhov's Three Sisters, Watford, playing Masha, was "ripely sensual", "memorable" and "the essence of Chekhovian suffering", according to critics. Other stage appearances outside the West End included Mrs Conklin and Hilde Latymer in a Noël Coward double bill in Basingstoke, and Gertrude in Hamlet at Ludlow. The Stage, commenting in 1974 that Watford was too rarely seen in London, asked "why it is that this supremely talented actress so seldom gets the parts she deserves in the theatres to which her abilities entitle her".

During the 1970s, Watford continued to appear in numerous one-off television dramas, including Special Branch in 1973. But her most conspicuous screen role was as co-star with George Cole in the comedy series Don't Forget to Write!, written by Charles Wood. It originated in a single comedy written for ITV in 1974, but was taken up by the BBC. Twelve episodes were made in two series between 1977 and 1979. The comic playing of Cole and Watford was likened by The Stage to "a superb Rolls Royce ... gliding smoothly and effortlessly along" but with "hidden power under the bonnet".

Her radio roles in the 1970s included Minna in a drama about the life of Richard Wagner, leading parts in adaptations of stories by Maugham, Henry James, George Meredith and Daphne du Maurier; Mrs Davenport in the premiere of Terence Rattigan's Cause Célèbre, and Lady Britomart in Shaw's Major Barbara. Her only cinema role of the decade was a deranged Indian servant in a horror film, The Ghoul.

== 1981–1994 ==
Watford's stage roles in her later years included Monica Reed, in Coward's Present Laughter, with Donald Sinden; her portrayal of the tolerant, amused secretary to Sinden's ageing matinée idol won her a Society of West End Theatre Award in 1981. In Shakespeare's All's Well That Ends Well for the Royal Shakespeare Company, her Countess of Roussillon – "gentle but dignified" – attracted comparisons with celebrated earlier interpretations by Edith Evans and Peggy Ashcroft. She was last seen in the West End as Alice More opposite Charlton Heston in A Man for All Seasons, in a production transferred from the Chichester Festival. The Evening Standard found her performance so touching that it "would make a stone weep". Offstage, she was vice-chairman of the Combined Theatrical Charities and was one of the four trustees of Equity.

The Times, describing Watford's last television work as among her best, instanced Grace Winslow in The Winslow Boy with Ian Richardson and Emma Thompson (whose role as the sister Watford had played in the 1958 BBC TV production), Dolly Bantry in two Miss Marple stories with Joan Hickson, and Sheila in Alan Ayckbourn's Relatively Speaking with Nigel Hawthorne. She was in several series, including Crown Court for ITV and Behaving Badly for Channel 4. The West End Present Laughter was filmed by the BBC, broadcast in 1981 and issued on DVD in 2007.

Watford's later career was curtailed by illness, but the year before her death she toured in Alan Bennett's Talking Heads. She died aged 66 from cancer, on 6 February 1994. A memorial service was held at the actors' church, St Paul's, Covent Garden, on 22 March 1994; Sinden read the lesson and there were readings by Gielgud, Judi Dench and other friends and colleagues.

== Selected filmography ==
- The Fall of the House of Usher (1950) .... Lady Usher
- David Copperfield (1956) .... Rose Dartle
- The Winslow Boy (1958) (TV) .... Katherine Winslow
- Never Take Sweets from a Stranger (1960) .... Sally Carter
- The Grass Is Greener (1960) .... Hairdresser's receptionist (uncredited)
- The Barretts of Wimpole Street (1961) (TV) .... Elizabeth Barrett
- The Very Edge (1963) .... Sister Holden
- Cleopatra (1963) .... Calpurnia
- Do You Know This Voice? (1964) .... Jackie Hopta
- Valley of the Kings (1964) .... Mrs. Marsh
- The Rise and Rise of Cesar Birotteau (1965) (TV) .... Constance Birotteau
- Broome Stages (1966) (TV) .... Lettice Broome
- Taste the Blood of Dracula (1969) .... Martha Hargood
- Shadows of Fear (1970) .... Moira Astle (episode Did You Lock Up?)
- A Face of Your Own (1973) (TV) .... Moira
- The Ghoul (1975) .... Ayah
- In This House of Brede (1975) (TV) .... Dame Catherine
- Crown Court (1977) (TV) | The Silencer – Barbara Truscott
- Don't Forget To Write! (1977–1979) (TV) .... Mable Maple
- The Agatha Christie Hour: The Case of the Middle-Aged Wife (1982) (TV) .... Maria Packington
- Miss Marple: The Body in the Library (1984) (TV).... Mrs. Dolly Bantry
- Sorrell and Son (1984)
- Cry Freedom (1987) .... Wendy's Mother
- Behaving Badly (1989) (TV) .... Frieda
- Relatively Speaking (1990) (TV) .... Sheila Carter
- The Winslow Boy (1990) (TV) .... Grace Winslow
- Miss Marple: The Mirror Crack'd from Side to Side (1992) (TV) .... Mrs. Dolly Bantry (final film role)

== Notes, references and sources ==
=== Sources ===
- Gielgud, John (2004). Richard Mangan (ed.). Gielgud's Letters. London: Weidenfeld and Nicolson. ISBN 978-0-297-82989-8.
- Herbert, Ian, ed. (1977). Who's Who in the Theatre (sixteenth ed.). London and Detroit: Pitman Publishing and Gale Research. ISBN 978-0-273-00163-8.
