= Medical School Admissions: Report of a formal investigation into St. George's Hospital Medical School (1988) =

1988 enquiry by the Commission for Racial Equality

Report of a formal investigation into St George's Hospital Medical School (1988)
- Created: February 1988
- Commissioned by: Commission for Racial Equality

A report on the formal investigation into student applications at St George's Hospital Medical School was published in 1988 by the Commission for Racial Equality (CRE), gaining media attention after concluding that London's St George's Hospital Medical School, with its higher medical student admission rate from ethnic minorities relative to other London medical schools, used computer software to discriminate against females and school students with non-European sounding names, so reducing their chance of being called for interview.

The CRE carried out a formal investigation after two St George's senior lecturers, Joe Collier and Aggrey Burke, informed them, in 1986, that their medical school used computer software to unfairly screen medical student applications.

In February 1988, the CRE concluded that contrary to the Race Relations Act 1976, St George's had directly discriminated on racial grounds, via its computer admissions software and selection process.

The findings demonstrated how an institution that appeared to have adequate equal opportunities policies, was also shown to simultaneously be discriminatory, and that "the prejudice of a computer is no less than that of its designers." The investigation led to changes in medical school admissions processes throughout the UK.

== Background ==
In his book entitled Migrant Architects of the NHS, the historian Julian M. Simpson notes that not long before the St Georges computer programme was discovered to systematically disadvantage ethnic minority medical student applicants, “discrimination on the grounds of ethnicity and national origin was in fact openly practised within the NHS”. One consequence of the 1976 Race Relations Act was the founding of the CRE, which was able to initiate investigations of discrimination and ensure the Act was complied with. It covered housing, health, welfare, employment and education.

== Introduction ==
The report begins with an introduction explaining that in early December 1986, the CRE received enough information to commence a formal investigation into the admissions processes at St George's, following two publications; one in 1985 by Peter Richards and Chris McManus and the other in 1986 by clinical pharmacologist Joe Collier and psychiatrist Aggrey Burke. Collier and Burke, both senior lecturers at St George's, had informed the CRE that their medical school used computer software to unfairly screen medical student applications.

== Preliminary evidence ==
Collier and Burke looked at the names that had taken the final examinations at 11 London medical schools in the years of 1982, 1983 and 1984, and found a variation in the proportion of non-European names, ranging from five per cent at Westminster Medical School, 12 per cent at St George's and 16 per cent at the Royal Free. These results also correlated with the proportion of women, and they concluded that

the results of this survey suggest that racial and sexual discrimination operate when students are selected for medical education at London colleges.

In McManus and Richards longitudinal study of 1,300 student applicants in 1981, where data came from UCCA forms, there was greater percentage of UK nationals with European names being admitted than of UK nationals with non-European sounding names. Their conclusion was

British applicants with non-European surnames had a lower probability of acceptance at UK medical schools, which cannot be explained in terms of academic achievement or delay in application but is a consequence of having a greater chance of being assessed both from UCCA forms and at interview, as being less suitable on non-academic grounds.

== Findings ==
St George's cooperated fully with the CRE. Several staff at St George's were unaware of how the software worked. Geoffrey T. Franglen had developed the software to replicate the behaviour of admissions staff in order to reduce their workload associated with initial admissions procedures. It effectively underscored those with non-European names and intentionally allowed the continuation of the discrimination that was already taking place. The software operator, Mr Evans also knew, had previously informed a superior, but no further action was taken. By 1979, the software correlated with their behaviour by up to 95 per cent. This was considered a crucial finding, "the programme was not introducing new bias but merely reflecting that already in the system".

Data was collected from UCCA forms and race was deduced from the sounding of the names. By 1982, the software was responsible for all initial selections. Near 60 candidates applying to St George's may have been declined an interview as a direct result of the software used. Another concern was that St George's had a "good" record of admissions when it came to race, with higher rates of admissions from ethnic minorities, leading to the question of what may be happening at other medical colleges.

== Conclusion ==
The responsibility of the computer software at St George's lay significantly with Franglen who, in 1979, coded the algorithm that selected for student admission. Its biases were discovered and the system removed in 1988. The report documented several occasions when the issue could have been addressed. It demonstrated how an institution that appeared to have adequate equal opportunities policies, was also shown to simultaneously be discriminatory, and that "the prejudice of a computer is no less than that of its designers."

In February 1988, the CRE concluded that contrary to the Race Relations Act 1976, St George's had directly discriminated on racial grounds, via its computer admissions software and selection process.

== Response ==
Joe Collier, Black History Month at St George's Hospital, 2026

Baba Sheeba, St George's Hospital, 2026

The commission's investigation into the case and media coverage led to a change in admissions procedures in higher education, throughout the UK. The report was a focus of one BBC Panorama programme.

The enquiry is considered to have had significant impact. St George's changed their admissions policy after admitting "entrenched bias". Some of the previously declined applicants were subsequently offered places. Two studies published in 1995 observed less bias but that discrimination had not been totally eradicated at several British medical schools.
