= Ann McPherson =

British doctor

Ann McPherson CBE FRCGP FRCP SCH
- Born: 22 June 1945; Golders Green
- Died: 28 May 2011 (aged 65)
- Education: St George's, University of London
- Occupation: general practitioner
- Known for: Healthcare Professionals for Assisted Dying

Ann McPherson CBE FRCGP FRCP SCH (née Egelnick; 22 June 1945 – 28 May 2011) was a British general practitioner, author, health campaigner and communicator who co-founded The DIPEx Charity and founded Healthcare Professionals for Assisted Dying.

== Early life ==
McPherson was born and grew up in Golders Green, North London. She was the only child of Sadie and Max Egelnick, a tailor. Both parents were secular Jewish Communists from Eastern European immigrant families. McPherson was a good student at Copthall County Grammar School in Mill Hill but found it difficult to get a place to study medicine owing to her political background and gender. However, she was offered a place at St George's Hospital Medical School where she excelled in her studies and busied herself with social, political and academic activities.

== Career ==
Throughout McPherson's career she aimed to communicate to the public about medicine, improve 'the patient journey' and help doctors and patients to understand each other.

=== General Practitioner ===
Having graduated with a distinction in 1968, McPherson chose to pursue General Practice and trained at Caversham Practice in Kentish Town, London and at Harvard, in Boston USA. In 1979 McPherson became Principal at a practice in Oxford where she worked until 2007 when she retired for her own health reasons. As a GP, McPherson became known for having a 'sixth sense' in diagnosing her patients. McPherson was respected for being ready to fight her patients' corner with consultants and for being available to concerned patients by phone on evenings and weekends.

Following her own experience of overcoming breast cancer, McPherson co-founded the Database of Individual Patient Experiences or 'DIPEx', with the aim of providing a resource that would enable patients, families and health professionals to understand the experience of a variety of health conditions, by watching video clips of people talking about their experiences. The websites healthtalkonline.org and youthhealthtalk.org now cover over 60 health conditions. The research is carried out by The Health Experiences Research Group at Oxford University. The group was founded by McPherson herself and she held the position of Medical Director, until her death in 2011.

At the time McPherson died, she was fundraising towards establishing The Health Experiences Research Institute in Oxford with the aim of becoming "the world's first interdisciplinary academic research centre dedicated to understanding the attitudes, values and experiences of people coping with illness or making decisions about their health, and to use this to make a difference" at Green Templeton College.

McPherson was a champion of young people's health and held the position of Chairman of the Royal College of General Practitioners adolescent task group, served on the Independent Advisory Committee on Teenage Pregnancy and was a founding Trustee of the Association of Young People’s Health.

=== Author ===
McPherson published 30 books including Women's Health in General Practice, written with Deborah Waller. In 1987, McPherson co-authored the book 'Diary of Teenage Health Freak' with Aidan McFarlane. The book was published in 27 languages, sold over 1 million copies. The book inspired McPherson and McFarlane to set up a website, Teenagehealthfreak, where children and teenagers can find out about health issues and contact 'Dr. Ann' the virtual doctor with their problems. The television comedy series Teenage Health Freak was based on the book.

=== Campaigning for Assisted Dying ===
In 2009, McPherson wrote an article for the British Medical Journal in support of a change in the law to allow terminally ill patients the option of assisted suicide or 'assisted dying' which was the term that Ann preferred. She received numerous emails and letters from other doctors in support of her position. Encouraged by this support, she founded Healthcare Professionals for Assisted Dying in October 2010, which had more than 400 members at the time of writing. McPherson took her campaign to the mainstream media appearing, among others, in the Independent and on the Today programme) and Sky News. McPherson was also a Patron of Dignity in Dying.

== Personal life ==
Ann married Klim McPherson in May 1968. The couple lived in North Oxford and had 3 children.

McPherson recovered from breast cancer in the late 1990s but was diagnosed with pancreatic cancer in 2007. Ann died on 28 May 2011 aged 65.

Among those paying tribute to McPherson was the actor Hugh Grant, whom she had persuaded to become Patron to The DIPEx Charity. He said "Ann was an amazing woman, doctor, author, campaigner and founder of the inspired healthtalkonline. I am so delighted she nagged me into helping with it and I am so sorry for her family, for medicine and for the country that she has gone".

== Awards and accolades ==
In 2000, McPherson was given a CBE for her work on women's and adolescent health. She received the Medical Journalists' Association's Lifetime Achievement Award in July 2010. In 2011 McPherson received the British Medical Journal's Health Communicator of the Year award. The award was accepted on McPherson's behalf by her husband Klim and Hugh Grant, as Patron on The DIPEx Charity. In Hugh Grant's speech he described McPherson as "part Doctor, part campaigner, part stalker" in reference to her unyielding efforts to secure his support for The DIPEx Charity.

== Publications ==
- Diary of a Teenage Health Freak (1987)
- Women's Health in General Practice (1997)
- Adolescents: the Agony, the Ecstasy, the Answers: A book for Parents (1999)
- Sex: The Facts (2003)
- Drugs: The Facts (2003)
- Bullying: The Facts (2004)
- Relationships: The facts (2004)
- The Truth: a teenager’s survival guide (2007)
