= Patience Collier =

British actress (1910–1987)

- Born: Irene Marjorie Ritscher; 19 August 1910; London, England
- Died: 13 July 1987 (aged 76); London, England
- Occupation: Actress
- Spouse: Henry Oswald Jackson Collier
- Children: Susan Collier; Joe Collier; Sarah Campbell

Patience Collier (born Irene Marjorie Ritscher; 19 August 1910 – 13 July 1987) was a British actress.

== Career ==
Patience Collier began her theatrical career in Manchester.

In 1956 she played Maria in Denis Cannan and Pierre Bost's The Power and the Glory opposite Brian Wilde, Roger Delgado and Paul Scofield at the Phoenix Theatre. The same year, she appeared as a "delightful vignette" opposite John Gielgud in Noël Coward's Nude with Violin, which appeared in Dublin in the September.

From 25 May 1966, she appeared in Sławomir Mrożek's play Tango at the Aldwych Theatre alongside Ursula Mohan, Mike Pratt, Peter Jeffrey and Dudley Sutton under director Trevor Nunn.

On television, she appeared as Katerina Matakis in Who Pays the Ferryman and Emma Mullrine in Sapphire & Steel. She played a retiring schoolteacher, in the 1973 episode, 'The Classroom', in ITV (TV channel)'s 'The Frighteners', with Clive Swift.

In film, Collier appeared in The Third Secret (1964), Decline and Fall... of a Birdwatcher (1968), Baby Love (1969), House of Cards (1969), Perfect Friday (1970), Every Home Should Have One (1970), Fiddler on the Roof (1971), Countess Dracula (1971), Endless Night (1972) and The French Lieutenant's Woman (1981), and appeared in TV series such as The Avengers, in the "Crescent Moon" episode (1961), David Copperfield (1974–75), Edward the Seventh (1975), Love in a Cold Climate (1980), and The Pickwick Papers (1985). She portrayed Elizabeth I several times, including in the 1978 TV series Will Shakespeare.

== Personal life ==
She was married to scientist Henry Oswald Jackson Collier and had three children with him. Her daughters, Susan and Sarah became textiles designers. Her son is Joe Collier, a clinical pharmacologist.

== Filmography ==
Year	Title	Role	Notes
1962	The Girl on the Boat	Miss Millican	
1964	The Third Secret	Mrs Pelton	
1965	The Wild Affair	Woman in Travel Agency	
1969	Baby Love	Mrs Carmichael	
1969	House of Cards	Gabrielle de Villemont	
1968	Decline and Fall... of a Birdwatcher	Flossie Fagan	
1968	Mystery and Imagination	Madame de la Rougierre	episode: "Uncle Silas"
1970	Every Home Should Have One	Mrs Monty Levin	
1970	Perfect Friday	Nanny	
1971	Countess Dracula	Julie	
1971	Fiddler on the Roof	Grandma Tzeitel	
1972	Endless Night	Miss Townsend	
1973	The National Health	The Lady Visitor	
1974	David Copperfield	Betsey Trotwood	
1981	The French Lieutenant's Woman	Mrs Poulteney	
