= The Fall of the House of Usher (1950 film) =

- Opening titles
- Directed by: Ivan Barnett
- Written by: Edgar Allan Poe (story); Dorothy Catt; Kenneth Thompson
- Produced by: Ivan Barnett
- Starring: Gwendoline Watford; Kaye Tendeter; Irving Steen; Vernon Charles
- Cinematography: Ivan Barnett
- Music by: W.L. Trytel
- Production company: GIB Films
- Distributed by: Vigilant Films
- Release date: June 1950 (UK)
- Running time: 70 minutes
- Country: United Kingdom
- Language: English

The Fall of the House of Usher is a 1950 British second feature ('B') horror film directed by Ivan Barnett and starring Gwen Watford in her film debut, Kaye Tendeter and Irving Steen. The screenplay was by Dorothy Catt and Kenneth Thompson, adapted from the 1839 short story of the same title by Edgar Allan Poe.

== Plot ==
The film uses a framing device set in a gentlemen's club where one of the members reads to his friends from a copy of Poe's book.

A century before, a young man visits a bleak-looking mansion in the English countryside where his friend Lord Roderick Usher lives with his sister Lady Madeline. They are both mysteriously ill and he discovers that they are suffering from a curse caused by their father which will lead to them both dying shortly, resulting in the downfall and end of the ancient family of Usher.

== Cast ==
- Gwen Watford as Lady Madeline Usher (credited as Gwendoline Watford)
- Kaye Tendeter as Lord Roderick Usher
- Irving Steen as Jonathan
- Vernon Charles as Dr. Cordwall
- Connie Goodwin as Louise
- Gavin Lee as the butler
- Keith Lorraine as George
- Lucy Pavey as the hag
- Tony Powell-Bristow as Richard
- Robert Woolard as Greville

== Production and release ==
The film was made in Hastings by a low-budget company GIB Films. Ivan Barnett produced the film and also worked as director and cinematographer. The film was made in 1948, but it was not released until 1950. It was issued an 'H' Certificate, a rarity at the time, by the British Board of Film Censors. Despite its limited budget the film proved surprisingly successful on its release as a second feature and even topped the bill in some cinemas. It was reissued in 1955 and again in 1961. It may have been an influence on the subsequent development of Hammer Horror.

== Reception ==
Kine Weekly wrote: "he tale is a classic of its kind, but neither the cast nor the director is fully capable of transferring its superb macabre to the screen. Its dark atmosphere and creepy surface action should, however, chill the spines of the less exacting. Playable horrific for the industrial masses and the sticks."

Variety wrote: "This Edgar Allan Poe chiller has been converted into a sub-standard film. Acting, direction, photography and other technical aspects seem almost amateurish. Commercial chances, even as dualer, are negligible. Except for Edgar Allan Poe, no name values are connected with this effort. Perhaps the trouble is that one man undertook too much. Ivan Barnett is credited with the production, direction and camera.

In British Sound Films: The Studio Years 1928–1959 David Quinlan rated the film as "mediocre", writing: "Disjointed and hard to follow, but at times it is frightening."

== Bibliography ==
- Harper, Sue. Picturing the Past: The Rise and Fall of the British Costume Film. British Film Institute, 1994.
