= School of Medicine and Biomedical Sciences, University of Oxford =

Medical school in Oxford, England

School of Medicine and Biomedical Sciences
- Type: Medical school
- Established: Medical Teaching since c12th century Clinical School established 1936
- Dean: Gavin Screaton
- Director: Clinical Studies: Dr Catherine Swales; Pre-Clinical Studies/Biomedical Sciences: Dr Robert Wilkins
- Students: 952
- Undergraduates: 841
- Postgraduates: 111
- Location: Oxford, United Kingdom; 51.75888°N 1.25100°W
- Qualification gained: BM, BCh (Pre-Clinical Students also receive BA & BMS students receive BA/MBiomedsci)
- Colours: Oxford Blue
- Affiliations: University of Oxford; Oxford University Hospitals
- Website: www.medsci.ox.ac.uk/study

The School of Medicine and Biomedical Sciences is the medical school of the University of Oxford in the city of Oxford, England. It is a component of the Medical Sciences Division, and teaching is carried out in its various constituent departments.

== Overview ==
The School of Medicine and Biomedical Sciences at the University of Oxford is traditional in its teaching and is therefore split into Pre-Clinical and Clinical phases of the course, with Pre-Clinical (Years 1–3) students being based in the University Science Area in Oxford City Centre, and Clinical students (Years 4–6) being based at the John Radcliffe Hospital, in Headington, Oxford.

The medical school was ranked the 1st in the world by the 2019 Times Higher Education rankings of Universities for Pre-Clinical, Clinical and Health Studies (a position it has held for nine consecutive years).

The first female scholar admitted to the school was Christine Lee.

== Teaching ==
The medical school admits 150 students per year onto its 6-year BM BCh course, which is a traditionally structured course consisting of two halves; a three-year pre-clinical component with little patient contact and a high focus on the scientific principles of medical practice, and ends with the award of a Bachelor of Arts degree in Medical Sciences, and a three-year clinical component with a high level of patient exposure that ends with the awarding of the BM BCh (Bachelor of Medicine, Bachelor of Surgery) degree, which provides provisional registration to the General Medical Council, and entry to the Foundation Programme.

There is also an accelerated Graduate Entry Course which leads to the award of BM BCh in 4 years, with approximately 30 in each cohort. This course is designed for those who already hold bachelor's degrees in applied or theoretical sciences. This course has an intensive 1–year component with a mix of pre-clinical and clinical teaching, and then the cohort integrates with existing students in their 4th year for the final three years of the course.

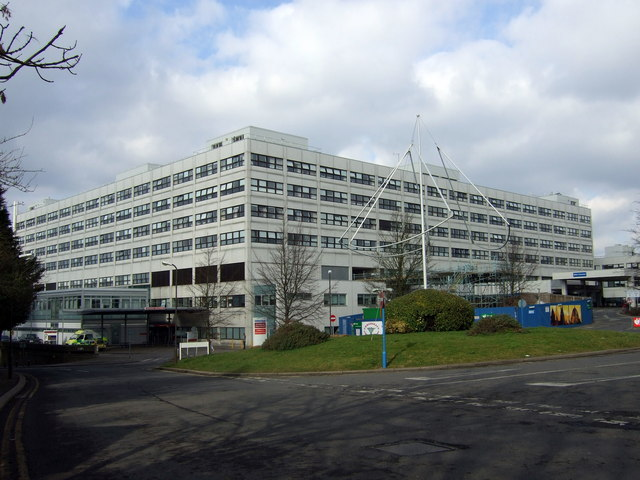
The John Radcliffe Hospital

== Facilities ==
Most pre-clinical teaching occurs at the Medical Sciences Teaching Centre, located within the Oxford University Science Area. Large amounts of tutorial teaching takes places within the colleges of the University of Oxford. Clinical teaching (and the medical school offices) is concentrated at the Academic Centre within the John Radcliffe Hospital (which is a part of the Oxford University Hospitals).

The two main libraries associated with the Medical School are the Radcliffe Science Library (for Pre-Clinical students) and the Bodleian Health Care Libraries (The Cairns Library at the John Radcliffe and the Knowledge Centre at the Churchill Hospital). Prior to its closure in 2007, teaching also occurred at the Radcliffe Infirmary.
