= Girl on the Trapeze =

- The Avengers episode
- Episode no.: Season 1 Episode 6
- Directed by: Don Leaver
- Written by: Dennis Spooner
- Production code: 3370
- Original air date: 11 February 1961

Guest appearances
- Kenneth Warren; Mia Karam; Howard Goorney

Episode chronology
← Previous "Crescent Moon"	Next → "Diamond Cut Diamond"

"Girl on the Trapeze" is the sixth episode of the first series of the 1960s cult British spy-fi television series The Avengers, starring Ian Hendry and Ingrid Hafner, and guest starring Mia Karam, Howard Goorney, and Kenneth J. Warren. It was performed and aired live on ABC on 11 February 1961, and is one of only three series 1 episodes which are known to exist (as of 2022), complete. The episode was directed by Don Leaver, and written by Dennis Spooner.

It is notable as being one of only two Avengers episodes in which the character of John Steed, played by Patrick Macnee (who, at this point in the series' history, was a supporting character to Hendry's David Keel, not the lead), does not appear.

== Plot ==
Dr. Keel rescues a young woman who tries to commit suicide by jumping into the River Thames. The woman is a trapeze artist with a visiting Central European circus. Foreign agents are trying to use her to force her father, a scientist who defected to Britain, to return to his country home.

== Cast ==
- Ian Hendry as Dr. David Keel
- Ingrid Hafner as Carol Wilson
- Mia Karam as Anna Danilov
- Howard Goorney as Supt. Lewis
- Kenneth J. Warren as Zibbo
- Edwin Richfield as Stefan
- Delena Kidd as Vera Korsova
- Ivor Salter as Police Sergeant
- David Grey as Dr. Sterret
- Dorothy Blythe as Box Office Clerk
- Ian Gardiner as Policeman
- Andy Alston as Turek

== Production ==
The episode was broadcast live on ABC on 11 February 1961.
