= Jenny Higham =

First woman to serve as principal of St George's, University of London

Jenny Higham FRCOG, FRCP
- Born: Warrington, England, UK
- Education: University College London
- Occupations: Vice-Chancellor & CEO University of Suffolk

Jenny Higham is Vice-Chancellor and Chief Executive Officer (CEO) of the University of Suffolk having commenced the role in 2024. Previously, she was the first woman to serve as Principal of St George's, University of London, taking up an appointment in November 2015. St George's, University of London obtained university status in June 2022, meaning Higham's position became Vice-Chancellor. She was the first female to be elected Chair of the Medical Schools Council (August 2016). Higham was also an Honorary Consultant at St. Georges NHS Foundation Trust until 2024 and a Visiting Professor at the Imperial College London.

== Education ==
Higham was born in Warrington and also lived in Gloucestershire and Norfolk during her childhood. She undertook her secondary education at Thorpe Grammar School, Norwich. She also studied for a year at Norwich City College.

== Early Career ==
Higham studied for her MBBS at University College London (UCL), graduating in 1985 with Distinction. She received the Atchison Scholarship, which is an annual award presented by UCL to the student who showed the best work and greatest proficiency in the medicine graduating year. She undertook specialist training in Obstetrics and Gynaecology, obtaining her MRCOG in 1992 and FRCOG in 2005. In addition to clinical training, she worked towards a research higher degree, investigating the clinical association and treatment of menorrhagia, awarded by the University of London in 1993. She remained clinically active as a gynaecologist until 2024.

Higham has previously held senior positions at Imperial College London, including Head of Undergraduate Medicine (2006–2009) and Vice Dean for Institutional Affairs and Director of Education for the Faculty of Medicine.

She led Imperial College London's work to establish the Lee Kong Chian School of Medicine in Singapore, a partnership between Nanyang Technological University and Imperial, which opened in 2013. She then served as the school's Senior Vice Dean from 2013 to 2015. In recognition of her work, she was awarded the Nanyang Education University Gold Award, the Imperial College Medal (2014), and honoured as a Fellow of the Teaching Excellence Academy at Nanyang Technological University (2015).

Higham received "Mentor of the Year" at the Women of the Future [WOF] Awards in 2011 and the Imperial College President and Rector's Award for Outstanding Contribution to Teaching Excellence in 2013.

She previously worked at St Mary's (now Imperial College Healthcare Trust), appointed as Senior Lecturer in obstetrics and gynaecology in 1997. Here, she contributed to the amalgamation of the curricula from the three medical schools (St Mary's, Charing Cross and Westminster) that merged to form the new medical school at Imperial College London.

Research interests included using advanced simulation in medical education. Her previous research publications having focused on reproductive medicine.

Higham delivered the Academy of Medical Educators' Annual Calman Lecture 2017 and then accepted an Honorary Fellowship. In July 2018 Jenny Higham was awarded an Honorary Doctorate from Brighton and Sussex Medical School. The previous month she was appointed as a Fellow of the Royal College of Physicians.

Higham has sat on many boards, including the Clinical Academic Staff Advisory Group (2013–2015); the Higher Education North West London Board (2012–2015); the General Medical Council's Education and Training Advisory Board; West Middlesex University Trust (2009–2015) and University of London Institute of Paris (2018-2022).

== Later Career ==
Higham was the first woman to serve as Principal of St George's, University of London, taking up an appointment in November 2015. St George's, University of London obtained university status in June 2022, meaning Higham's position became Vice-Chancellor. She has been involved with the academic medical policy Medical Schools Council and has chaired the council's Education Sub-Committee (2015–16). She was Treasurer until 2016 when she took the position of Chair from 2016-2019. She was a member of the Boards of St Georges University Hospital Foundation Trust, now George's Epsom St Helier (GESH) for 9 years until 2024, and the South London Health Innovation Network.

In July 2021 it was confirmed that Higham sat on the London Higher Board of Trustees as a co-opted member until 2024.

In her role as Vice-Chancellor, Higham successfully led the merger of St George's, University with City, University of London on behalf of St George's until the formal creation of the new City St George's, University of London in August 2024.

In July 2022, Higham was confirmed as a member of the Government's R&D People and Culture Ministerial Coordination Group. Higham is also a council member for the All-Party Parliamentary University Group, sitting until 2024.

In May 2024, Higham was awarded Freedom of the City of London which was unanimously approved by the Court of Common Council.

Following the creation of City St George's, Higham commenced her current role as Vice-Chancellor and CEO of the University of Suffolk at the end of August 2024. Higham was awarded an Honorary Fellowship by City St George's, University of London in July 2026. This award recognised Higham's outstanding leadership and contributions to higher education and the development of City St George's.

== Current External Activities ==
Higham joined the Universities UK (UUK) Board in 2019, joining the Audit and Risk Committee in 2020 and more recently the Remuneration Committee. Higham was elected as the Universities UK Funding Policy Lead for an initial term of three years from 1 August 2021 to 31 July 2024. She was re-elected in May 2024 to serve another term as Financial Sustainability and Regulation Policy Lead.

Higham became a Member of the Board of the Universities & Colleges Employers Association in June 2019 to June 2023 and was then renewed for a further term. Higham is Deputy Chair of the Universities & Colleges Employers Association (UCEA). In April 2024, Higham took up the position of Chair of the Remuneration Committee for the Universities & Colleges Employers Association Clinical Academic Staff Advisory Group for an initial term of office from 1 June 2024 to 31 May 2027.

Higham's term on the UCEA Board and position as Deputy Chair has been further extended until 2028. She continues to Chair the Remuneration Committee and Chair the Clinical Academic Staff Advisory Group (CASAG) Specialist Committees.

She is a supporter of the Quentin Blake Centre for Illustration, which opened in 2026 - initially serving on the Capital Project Sub-Committee 2022-2026 and moving to the Operations and Facilities Committee 2026 onwards

As Vice-Chancellor and CEO of the University of Suffolk, Higham contributes regionally as Deputy Chair of the Ipswich Vision Board and also a Board Member of Ipswich Central and where she has supported the Ipswich City of Culture bid. From 2026, she became Chair of the Wolsey 550.
