= Edgar G. Engleman =

U.S. pathologist and physician-scientist

Edgar G. Engleman (born 1945) is an American pathologist and physician-scientist who researches cancer immunology. He is a professor of pathology and of medicine (immunology and rheumatology) at Stanford University School of Medicine. He is also a co-founder of Vivo Capital, a Healthcare Investment firm.

== Life ==
Engleman earned a B.A., magna cum laude, from Harvard College in 1967. He completed a M.D. from the Columbia University College of Physicians & Surgeons in 1971. He was an intern in medicine at Moffitt Hospital, University of California, San Francisco from 1971 to 1972. This was followed by a residency at the University of California Hospital in San Francisco from 1972 to 1973. Engleman was a research associate in the laboratory of biochemistry under Earl Reece Stadtman at the National Heart, Lung, and Blood Institute from 1973 to 1976. He was a postdoctoral fellow in immunogenetics and rheumatology under Hugh McDevitt at the Stanford University School of Medicine from 1976 to 1978.

After studying immunology as a post-doctoral fellow, in 1978, Engleman became a faculty member in the department of pathology. He was an assistant professor of pathology and medicine. He was promoted to professor with tenure in 1990. The same year, he won an NIH MERIT award.

At Stanford University, Engleman has been researching the immune system and its role in diseases for forty years. Since 1980 he has been the founding director of the Stanford Blood Center, which allowed him to access immune cells (or white blood cells) for his immunological research. He moved into the field of cancer biology. He directs the Engleman Lab, focusing on studying the cellular immunology of cancer. His research was the basis for the first active immunotherapeutic strategy for cancer to be approved by the FDA in 2010.

== Selected works ==
- Engleman, Edgar G., ed. (1980). Genetic Control of the Human Immune Response: Proceedings a Conference Sponsored by the Kroc Foundation, Santa Ynes Valley, California 28 Jan-1 Feb 1980. Vol. 152. Rockefeller University Press.
- Engleman, Edgar G.; Foung, Steven K. H.; Larrick, James W.; Raubitschek, Andrew A., eds. (1985). Human Hybridomas and Monoclonal Antibodies. Boston, MA: Springer US. doi:10.1007/978-1-4684-4949-5. ISBN 978-1-4684-4951-8. S2CID 3005405.
