= Susan Collier =

English textile designer (1938–2011)

- Born: Susan Jane Collier; 12 October 1938; Manchester, England
- Died: 11 May 2011 (aged 72); London, England
- Occupation: Textile designer
- Known for: Floral print dresses
- Relatives: Patience Collier (mother); Sarah Campbell (sister); Joe Collier (brother)

Susan Jane Collier (12 October 1938 – 18 May 2011) was an English textile designer. She began in a freelance capacity and sold sketches to scarf brands Richard Allan and Jacquar. Collier joined Liberty in 1961, and specialised in floral prints dresses. She was helped by her sister Sarah Campbell starting in 1968, and co-founded the independent Collier Campbell Ltd studio in 1979.

== Early life ==
Collier was born on 12 October 1938 in Manchester. She was the daughter of actress Patience Collier and campaigning pharmacologist Henry Oswald Jackson "Harry" Collier. She had two siblings; a sister Sarah and a brother Joe. Collier became interested in poetry because of her father, as well as an interest in natural forms such as wildlife. She had the importance of hard work and creative thought instilled in her from an early age. Both parents painted pictures of flowers which excited Collier, and they brought her drawer-lining paper and powder paints to practise her skill. She was taken on walks by her father which garnered an interest in nature, and taught her to concentrate on butterflies wings. Collier left school with three O Level qualifications at the age of 15 and attended catering college. She did not attend art school and therefore was not formally trained in the field. Collier moved to London when she was 18, and worked part-time as a theatrical dresser.

== Career ==
She started her career as a freelance textile designer in a self-made studio in a spare bedroom in her South London home. She was attracted to the area because of its cultural diversity and class mixture. Collier sold sketches of her work to the scarf brands Richard Allan and Jacqmar. She grew frustrated at another person was using her work under her name, and went to London Prints company Liberty. Collier decided that continue her career, the company would have to purchase two of her designs. They elected to purchase six in 1961 and commissioned further designs. She firstly worked for the Tana Lawn cotton range and specialised in floral prints dresses, and supplied Liberty scarves with designs. Collier began being assisted by her younger sister Sarah Campbell in 1968. That same year she was retained by Liberty. Collier was appointed as Liberty's design and colour consultant on its London Prints’ fabrics and products in 1971, and had responsibility for its apparel, decorative fabrics and accessory ranges. Collier eventually succeeded Bernard Nevill as design consultant.

Collier became determined to supply wholesale quantities required for couturiers ready-to-wear collection, and do a similar action for furnishings. She and Campbell founded the independent Collier Campbell Ltd studio in 1979; the two had made the decision to no longer work for other individuals. Collier worked on the design for the first off-the-peg collection by Yves Saint Laurent, along with Bill Gibb, Cacharel, and Daniel Hechter Paris. The company established relationships with several shopping firms. She left Liberty in 1977 which allowed her to retain copyright of her work. Her value was that good designs should be made available to every person. They were commissioned by Habitat to design their textile lifestyle look in 1974, and was the company's major textile converter by 1980. Collier Campbell won the Duke of Edinburgh's designer prize in 1984 for a decorative fabric collection called "six views", and four years later, they were commissioned by Conran to design the carpets Gatwick Airport's North Terminal.

== Personal life and death ==
She was twice married: firstly to pharmacologist Andrew Herxheimer in 1961 with whom she had two children, and to broadcaster Frank Delany. Both marriages ended in divorce. Collier died in London on 18 May 2011 from cancer.
