= Broome Stages =

1931 novel

- First US edition
- Author: Clemence Dane
- Cover artist: Rex Whistler
- Language: English
- Genre: Historical drama, Theatre-fiction
- Publisher: Heinemann (UK); Doubleday Doran (US)
- Publication date: 1931
- Publication place: United Kingdom
- Media type: Print

Broome Stages is a 1931 historical novel by the British writer Clemence Dane. It charts the fortunes of the Broomes, a theatrical dynasty, over two hundred years from Queen Anne's reign through to the present cinema era. It was one of Dane's most popular works.

The surname Broome echoes the name of the Plantagenets (from the Planta Genista, or common broom plant). The fortunes of the Broome family in the novel echo the fortunes of monarchs of England from William the Conqueror to Richard the Lionheart, although this is only made explicit in the author’s dedication.

== Plot summary ==
Richard Broome (based on Richard II, Duke of Normandy, father of William the Conqueror) is born in 1715 the son of a clergyman and his mistress, a poor widow. He befriends an old witch who before she dies teaches him a spell to be passed from father to daughter to son and on through generations of alternating gender; which makes the spellbinder (including him) irresistibly charming to others.

A visiting theatre company allows Richard to play the part of Oberon and he grows up to be a famous actor, patronised by the nobility. His child bride dies leaving a daughter whose own daughter Hilaret (Adela of France) joins Richard’s household and then his theatrical company. His second wife “a plainish heiress” gives him a son, Robert (Robert I, Duke of Normandy). Hilaret marries the Duke of Bedenham (Baldwin V, Count of Flanders) and has twelve children, including a son, Lionel (Robert I, Count of Flanders), whom she takes abroad in her old age, and a daughter, Lady Lettice (Matilda of Flanders, Queen of England).

Robert Broome also becomes a great actor. He takes over his father’s company and builds a new London theatre, the Gloriana, where he puts on a satirical play, written by himself, which is a hit. Older theatres try to take away his licence but he uses his connections, including the Duke of Bedenham (whose family name is Wybird), to see them off.

Robert’s son William (William the Conqueror), another actor, in turn becomes the company manager, despite resistance from Robert. William marries his cousin Lady Lettice (Matilda of Flanders).

In 1816, William announces that his father’s performance as Shylock in the Merchant of Venice will be his last. His father, furious, gives the performance of his life. When William plays Shylock himself in a later performance, his father Robert watches from a box at the Gloriana, determined to shoot his son if he fails in the role or to shoot himself if he succeeds. William’s performance is a success, and Robert shoots himself behind the box as his son takes the applause.

William and his new wife Lady Lettice survive the scandal by taking the company on tour. They have two sons, Russel (William Rufus, King of England) and Robert, known as Robin (Robert II, Duke of Normandy). William takes his mistress Miss Beverley on tour to America and becomes temporarily estranged from Lady Lettice who is left in England. William ventures back on to the London stage as Othello and is rapturously received. The performance causes a mental breakdown from which Lady Lettice nurses him back to health and they have a third son, Harry (Henry I, King of England).

Lady Lettice’s brother Lionel returns from overseas and her oldest son Russel (William Rufus), without his parents’ consent, starts to act at the Gloriana. William is angry but watches Russel’s début from the stalls. When Lionel waves to him at the end of the performance from a box, William mistakes him for an apparition of his own dead father Robert and has a heart attack, dying on the spot. Lettice blames Russel for his father’s death and refuses to support his acting career, which in turn leads to a falling out with Robin. Robin follows his brother Russel into the theatre and they both go to America. The youngest brother, Harry (Henry I), grows up as the apple of his mother Lettice’s eye and learns the arts of acting and theatrical management in London. Russel becomes the grand old man of the New York stage. In California, Robin marries a scheming actress who breaks his heart.

Harry makes contact with his brother Russel in America and with his brother Robin whom he discovers back in London, gravely ill and living in poverty with his young son, Stephen (King Stephen of England). Robin and Stephen are rescued and looked after by Lady Lettice.

Harry falls in love with Maud (Matilda of Scotland), the granddaughter of an impoverished Irish baronet, who is being brought into society by Lettice’s widowed sister, Lady Rosina. Rosina had in her youth been in love with Maud’s grandfather before making a conventional marriage to a richer man arranged by her mother, Duchess Hilaret. Harry marries Maud, and Lady Rosina, who is over 60, marries her old flame the baronet and retires to Ireland with him.

In the year of the Great Exhibition (1851) Maud engineers a reconciliation between her mother in law, Lady Lettice, and her brother in law, Russel. Lettice, in turn, resolves an unaccustomed quarrel between Maud and Harry. With Maud’s quiet support, the theatrical ventures of her husband, Harry, go from strength to strength. Maud and Harry have a beloved son, William, nicknamed Gilly (William Adelin, Duke of Normandy), and a twin daughter, Donna (Matilda, Holy Roman Empress).

Robin has written a savage autobiographical play with his wife in mind for the starring role which she successfully auditions for under an assumed name in a production put on at the Genista (a Broome theatre) by his brother Harry. Discovering the subterfuge (when Robin’s brother Russel sees her in rehearsal and recognises her), Harry engineers her departure before the opening night, not realising that Robin would have wanted her to play the part, which he wrote for her. The play is a hit nevertheless, with Russel in the leading male role. Robin dies after his long illness. Harry decides to nurture the Broome fortunes for the next generation: in particular, Stephen (son of his beloved brother Robin) and his own children Gilly and Donna.

Maud discovers a shabby music hall on the unfashionable south bank of the River Thames, and Harry buys it for her. It is rebuilt as the third Broome theatre, the New Broom, to go with their West End theatres, the Gloriana and the Genista. Maud dies, and Harry is bereft without her. Gilly is his favourite and he hopes to see him in Parliament. His daughter, Donna, is a strong character and he does not get on with her, but he trains her for the stage.

Harry learns from Donna that Gilly and Stephen are in a Shakespeare play at their boarding school and goes to see it in rehearsal. Gilly persuades his father to teach him the Broome charm or spell, which brings him bad luck, because by rights it should go from male to female, and Harry has failed to pass it on to his daughter Donna. (Richard Broome had taught it to Hilaret who taught it to Lionel who taught it to Lettice who taught it to Harry himself.)

In 1868, aged 16, Donna is taken away from the theatre and given a season in London society by her grandmother, Lettice. Donna is not a social success but agrees to marry a much older man, Sir Joscelyn Pallas (Henry V, Holy Roman Emperor), an Irish connection of her aunt Rosina. Donna is glad to get away from London and her English relations, being half-Irish herself through her mother Maud. The marriage is happy.

Gilly runs up debts and leads a dissolute life which causes a rift with his father Harry. Gilly takes the ocean liner Sylvania to join his uncle Russel on tour in America but it sinks and he dies (echoing William Adelin’s death in the White Ship disaster of 1120). Lettice asks Donna to return to London to support her father, who is devastated by Gilly’s death. She refuses. Her father himself asks her back, to take her brother’s place as his heir. In his letter, he mentions that he recently refused a knighthood: “My mother is the daughter of the late Duke of Bedenham and my father was William Broome, the son of Robert Broome, the son of Richard Broome. I do not care for a city title”. However, Donna maintains her refusal, and stays in Ireland with her elderly husband.

Stephen marries an actress, Madeleine (Matilda I, Countess of Boulogne), and they have a son, called Eustace (Eustace IV, Count of Boulogne).

Harry decides to marry again and have more children. He chooses a 22-year old friend of his daughter Donna called Adelaide Wybird (Adeliza of Louvain). Donna is relieved, feeling this takes the pressure off her to replace Gilly as heir, but Adelaide has a miscarriage, and it becomes clear that there will be no children from her marriage to Harry.

Donna’s husband Sir Joscelyn dies and Donna and her husband’s sisters need money to avoid having to sell up the estate in Ireland. This forces Donna to write to her father in England for help. Instead of writing back by post, Harry sends Stephen to Ireland to bring a letter to her by hand. The letter agrees to fund the estate, install a man to run it, and pay Donna a personal allowance greater than the one she asked for, sufficient to support her and her sisters-in-law for life. But the condition is that she must return to London and take her place in the theatre, failing which she will lose even her existing allowance. With no choice but to accept, Donna reluctantly goes back to London with Stephen, where she starts to act at the New Broom theatre, under Stephen’s management. Her acting is accomplished, but fails to charm the public.

Harry decides to put on King Lear. He casts Stephen as Edmund, Stephen’s wife Madeleine as Cordelia, Donna as Goneril, Russel (visiting from New York) as Kent and a young actor called Geoffrey Angers (Geoffrey of Anjou) as Edgar. Stephen also directs. After rehearsal, he berates Donna for her unbending attitude to audiences and fellow actors. They have a row, followed swiftly by an embrace when she stumbles and he catches her. They fall in love but, when he refuses to leave his wife, their affair ends after a few weeks without being discovered.

Donna starts making herself more popular, and rapidly becomes engaged to the American actor, Angers. The King Lear production opens and is well received. The first night dinner doubles as a wedding feast, but the speech is made by Donna’s uncle Russel, not her father Harry. When, eventually, Harry does speak, he refers to the failure of his own personal performance in the play and appears demented. Afterwards, he tells his mother he will never act again. When Lady Lettice moves towards him to remonstrate, she falls and catches the tablecloth, causing a candlestick to set fire to her clothes. Although Harry tries to extinguish the flames, she dies.

The London theatres are now owned one third by Harry, one third by Stephen (who has inherited Robin’s share) and one third by Russel. Harry learns to distrust Stephen’s business judgment.

Donna has a son seven months into the marriage, called Henry Edmund Broome (not Angers) (Henry II, King of England). Her husband Geoffrey takes them to his home country, America, where Donna acts in her uncle Russel’s company. She insists on playing Mazeppa in a traditional costume, which her husband considers indecent, in a quest to earn as much money as she can for their son Edmund. Angers and Donna separate but remain on good terms and reconcile after five years, dividing Edmund’s upbringing between them. Edmund learns about the running of a theatre, which interests him more than being an actor. At the age of ten, he is taken to his grandfather Harry Broome in London, who adores him. Edmund’s cousin Eustace (Stephen’s son) also adores him.

Donna and Geoffrey take Edmund back to America. But when Harry is ill in London and Donna goes back to him with Edmund, Geoffrey stays in America. Eventually, they are formally divorced.

Donna inherits her father’s share of the theatrical business, which includes some of Russel’s share (bought from him by Harry before he died). Harry directs her to pass it to Edmund when he is old enough. Stephen is left something to add to his father Robin’s share. He finds it difficult that Donna, a woman, is now his business partner, especially since she is a better manager than he is. But they own half each at this point and neither has power to break the deadlock.

Donna and Stephen try and negotiate a future business relationship. The discussion is fraught by their previous sexual relationship. Donna decides to force a sale, confident that, if the branches of the family separate, she and Edmund will do better than Stephen and Eustace (Stephen is giving Eustace a conventional school and university education but Donna is mixing Edmund’s schooling with practical experience of the theatre).

The partnership sells the Genista and the New Broom to Donna outright, but the Gloriana does not sell and is let to outside management. Donna also lets out the Genista to replenish her finances, but she immediately takes over the running of the New Broom herself. Stephen buys a small theatre behind Regent Street for his side of the family but it is Donna who flourishes, putting on Robin’s plays. Stephen, whose father wrote them, sues Donna. Expensive litigation follows, impoverishing both of them.

Lewis Wybird (King Louis VII of France), the bachelor grandson of Lady Lettice’s banker brother, who has inherited some Broome character from his ancestress Hilaret, diversifies his London property portfolio by buying up the Gloriana. Stephen uses his share of the proceeds to take productions on tour, but even outside London he is harried by Donna’s productions, which she deliberately sends out to compete with his. The civil war between them continues up and down the country for years. As Edmund grows up, he and his mother Donna start to gain some advantage.

Edmund and Eustace are on good terms, and Edmund realises that Eustace, destined for Oxford University, will not make his life in the theatre. Edmund also starts talking to his mother’s cousin and rival Stephen. Edmund tells his mother there must be a family reconciliation with Stephen so that they may prosper together instead of fighting each other.

A meeting takes place. At the last moment Stephen says he cannot exclude his own son Eustace by signing an agreement with Donna and Edmund. Although Eustace has not been educated for the theatre, Stephen insists: “I want to work with my son”. Donna then shocks Stephen and Edmund by revealing to Stephen: “There’s your son”. Edmund is incredulous but Stephen realises that Edmund is the product of his affair with Donna - and, therefore, just as much his son as Eustace is. Stephen signs the agreement.

A brilliantly successful partnership follows in which Stephen works actively with his new-found son Edmund. Edmund gets extra capital from old Russel, who has prevaricated over which side of the Broome family to support, by confiding in him that Stephen and he are father and son so there is only one side. Donna tells him off for the indiscretion, but Edmund throws the shame of his illegitimate birth back at her. Donna decides to give up her management of the New Broom to Edmund immediately and retire to her beloved Ireland. But Edmund persuades her to wait until he is married.

Lewis Wybird (King Louis VII of France) becomes engaged to marry a 22 year old heiress, Elinor Dale (Eleanor of Aquitaine), who had played with Edmund as a child. Edmund goes to the wedding festivities in 1894 as Lewis’s cousin, putting on some amateur theatricals as a wedding present. Donna is also invited as a guest. Elinor takes part in Edmund’s amateur theatricals. They fall in love. Lewis is old enough to be her father, and Elinor admits to Edmund that she is not in love with Lewis. Before the ceremony can take place, Edmund elopes with her. Lewis Wybird swears revenge but Donna persuades him he will look better if he is gracious.

Donna goes back to Ireland. Elinor visits here there, and Donna gives her a crash course in acting in order to equip her as Edmund’s wife.

Elinor and Edmund have three sons: Richard (King Richard II, the Lionheart), Henry (Henry the Young King) and Geoffrey, known as Gerry (Geoffrey II, Duke of Brittany). Stephen develops Elinor’s natural talents as an actress by playing opposite her on the London stage.

Stephen dies, enriching both his sons by inheritance. Elinor now plays with her husband Edmund as her leading man. She loves him, but he has affairs with his actresses and eventually she realises this. They start playing in separate productions in separate Broome theatres. Elinor is an independent success professionally but the marriage comes under strain when she discovers that her husband has an illegitimate son, Willie Marshall, at a London day school. When he tries to stop her going to the theatre because his leading lady there (and mistress) objects to a visit from Elinor, she tells him the break is final. They do not divorce but Elinor buys a house for herself in the country. Without her at his side, Edmund’s career as an actor and as a manager starts to falter. He discharges his current mistress from his company, and asks Elinor, whose own career at the other theatre is flourishing, for a reconciliation. She relents, and soon afterwards she gives birth to their fourth and youngest son, John (John, King of England).

Edmund has a tempestuous relationship with his growing sons, particularly Richard. Elinor has a healthier relationship with all of them, but her favourite is John, although his grandmother Donna sees in him troubling traces of the worst character traits of previous generations of the Broomes. Edmund resumes his old habits of sexual infidelity. The four boys are close to each other. Richard becomes a film actor, with a discrete male partner, Kenneth, whom he describes as his private secretary.

== Adaptation ==
It was adapted for radio as an episode of Orson Welles' The Campbell Playhouse series, broadcast in 1940.

In 1966 it was made into an eight-part television series Broome Stages by the BBC featuring Gwen Watford, Richard Pasco and Robin Phillips.

== Bibliography ==
- Frierson, William Coleman. The English Novel in Transition 1885-1940. Cooper Square Publishers, 1965 .
- Hartley, Cathy. A Historical Dictionary of British Women. Routledge, 2013.
- On Broome Stages by Clemence Dane: A Conversation with Kate Macdonald
- Cottis, D. 2022. Clemence Dane's Broome Stages - novel and play. From treading boards to the Book Society: Clemence Dane and her circle in the 1920s-1950s. Senate House, University of London 06 - 07 Oct 2022
