= Don't Forget to Write! =

- Genre: Sitcom
- Created by: Charles Wood
- Starring: George Cole; Gwen Watford; Francis Matthews; Ron Emslie; Claire Walker; Daphne Heard; Renny Lister; James Cossins (series 2)
- Theme music composer: Anthony Isaac
- Country of origin: United Kingdom
- Original language: English
- No. of series: 2
- No. of episodes: 12

Production
- Producer: Jon Waters
- Running time: 12 x 50 minutes
- Production company: BBC

Original release
- Network: BBC2
- Release: 18 April 1977 – 22 February 1979

Don't Forget to Write! is a British television sitcom, broadcast by the BBC from 1977 to 1979.

== Plot ==
The central character is Gordon Maple (George Cole) who was formerly a successful playwright, but is now procrastinating, lacking self-confidence and suffering from writer's block. He is seen at home with his supportive wife Mabel (Gwen Watford), son Wilfred (Ron Emslie) and daughter Kate (Claire Walker). They are frequently visited by neighbour Tom Lawrence (Francis Matthews) who is a confident, suave and successful playwright and cleaner Mrs Field (Daphne Heard).

== Production ==
The sitcom was written by the distinguished playwright and screenwriter Charles Wood. Each of the 12 episodes ran for longer than most sitcoms at 50 minutes and there is no laugh track or live studio audience. The first series of 6 episodes was broadcast on Mondays from 18 April to 23 May 1977 at 9pm, and repeated in 1978, while the second series was shown on Thursdays from 18 January to 22 February 1979 at 10pm and was not repeated. In 2013 a Region 4 DVD was released by BBC Worldwide for the Australian market.

The theme music was performed by The Anthony Isaac Band and features on the LP "Top BBC-TV Themes - Volume 2" issued by BBC Records in 1979.
