= Andrew Stone, Baron Stone of Blackheath =

British politician (born 1942)

The Right Honourable The Lord Stone of Blackheath
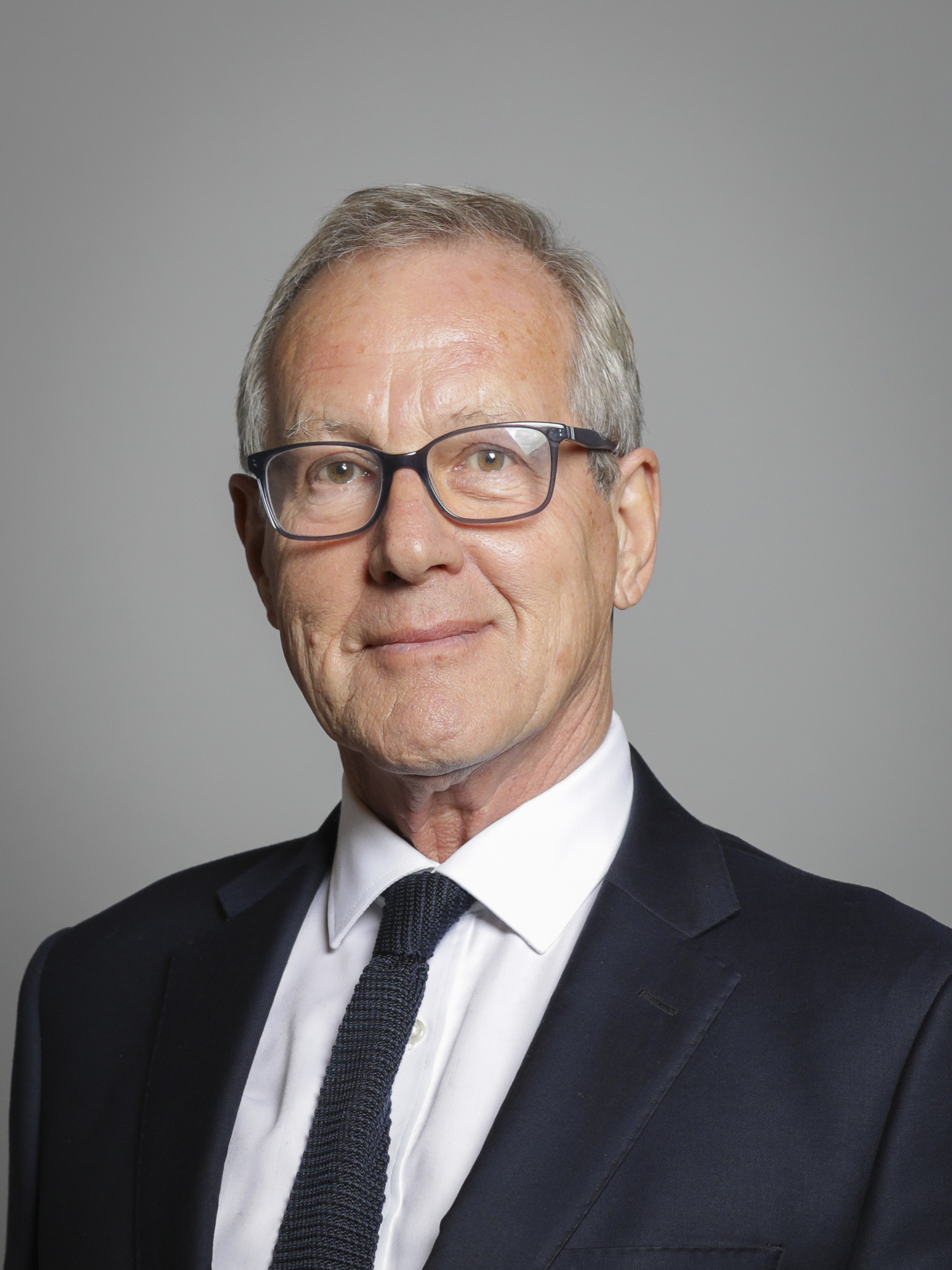
- Stone in 2019

Member of the House of Lords
- Lord Temporal
- Life peerage 29 October 1997 – 5 December 2025

Personal details
- Born: 7 September 1942 (age 84)
- Party: Labour (until 2019)

Andrew Zelig Stone, Baron Stone of Blackheath (born 7 September 1942) is a non-affiliated, and former Labour, member of the House of Lords.

He retired as joint managing director of Marks and Spencer plc in 1999.

He is currently a director of several non-government organisations, a retail company and is involved in several charities. He also chaired the charity DIPEx that helps patients gain information on their condition and their options. He was asked to retire from this charity due to behavioural investigations below.

In October 2019, he was suspended from the Labour peers group.

== Professional career ==
He joined Marks & Spencer as a trainee in 1966 and retired from his position as joint managing director of the company in 1999.

He is a director of N Brown Group plc. He was the non-executive chairman of Deal Group Media plc until 2007, when he resigned from this position. He is an advisory board member of The Next Century Foundation.

He was the chairman of Sindicatum Climate Change Foundation and chairman of The DIPEx Charity, a charitable health organisation. He is a governor of the Weizmann Institute of Science and honorary vice president of The Movement for Reform Judaism.

He is a patron of the Institute for Jewish Policy Research, the Gauchers Association, the New Israel Fund, the Jewish Chernobyl Children, the Orphaids charity, The Forgiveness Project (as of 2004) and LEAD Nepal – Development for the future of Nepalese Youth. He is a trustee of Prism the Gift Fund and formerly a trustee of the Olive Tree Educational Trust (now The Olive Tree Scholarship Programme at City University).

== Political career ==
He was created a life peer as Baron Stone of Blackheath, of Blackheath in the London Borough of Greenwich on 29 October 1997. He has voted strongly for the introduction of a smoking ban and for gay rights. He was a working Labour peer and did not usually rebel against his party. However, he has repeatedly voted against the party on House of Lords reform as well as on the Prevention of Terrorism Bill and the Hunting Bill.

He has listed his political interests as conflict resolution, art and science, health and ecology.

== Suspension, behavioural training and retirement ==
2019 suspension

Stone was suspended from the Labour peers group in October 2019 for making transphobic and harassing statements, then making racist remarks.

The Lords independent commissioner for standards upheld four complaints against Stone, accusing him of sexism, unwanted touching and transphobia.

In one incident, whilst alone with one woman in a stairwell, he told her she was looking beautiful with her hair worn differently from her usual style. On seeing her reaction to his comments, he grabbed her arm to insist that, although it might be thought sexist to say so, she really did look beautiful. He let go of her when someone else came through the door at the bottom of the stairs

Another complainant said Stone came to thank her for some work she had done, repeatedly stroking her arm. The complainant said this made her feel really uncomfortable, angry, anxious and pinned in, because she could not move her chair away from him.

Stone was also alleged to have joked to a young woman that he hoped a document relating to the upskirting bill “would contain photos”.

Two other complaints came after Lord Stone approached a stall about homophobia, biphobia and transphobia. He was with a guest, and loudly asked “Is this where he signs up for the trans operation, he wants to be trans.”

When one of the staff members on the stall complained he patted her arm and told her he was only joking.

2024 suspension and compulsory training

In December 2024, the House of Lords recommended that Lord Stone be suspended for six months after finding that he had bullied parliamentary security staff after he had left his suitcase unattended next to a parliamentary estate entrance.

After being challenged about the suitcase being a security risk, Stone called one employee ‘thick and stupid’ and when told it had to be removed stated ‘I don’t care if they piss on it’.

A full report on Stone’s conduct was published by the House of Lords Conduct Committee on 12 December 2024. He was suspended for six months in January 2026, after a report found that he had continued to exhibit poor behaviour.

2025 Retirement

Despite this training, on 5 December 2025 it was announced that Lord Stone had retired from the House of Lords, after further complaints about his conduct had been received.

2026 Standards Report and expulsion recommendation

On 29 April 2026, House of Lords Conduct Committee published a report into Lord Stone's conduct. The Conduct Committee endorsed the Commissioner’s conclusion that Lord Stone be permanently excluded from the House of Lords had he not already retired.

== Memberships ==
Lord Stone is a member of the International Trade Council. He is a member of Labour Friends of Israel.

== Arms ==
Coat of arms of Andrew Stone, Baron Stone of Blackheath

Crest
A dragon passant Gules gorged with a collar attached thereto a chain reflexed over the back and grasping in the dexter foot a pair of open scissors Or.
Escutcheon
Paly of four Vert and Gules four arms embowed in armour elbows outwards those in base reversed and all conjoined at the shoulder Proper garnished Or those in chief grasping a sword the blades downwards in saltire Argent hilts pommels and quillons Or and those in base each grasping a sword blades upwards in saltire Argent hilts pommels and quillons Or.
Supporters
Upon a compartment composed of stones Proper on the dexter side a ram Sable armed and unguled Or and holding in the mouth a sprig of heather Proper and on the sinister side a ram Sable armed and unguled Or holding in the mouth a sprig of calceolaria Proper.

Orders of precedence in the United Kingdom
Preceded by The Lord Naseby	Gentlemen; Baron Stone of Blackheath	Followed by The Lord Bassam of Brighton
