= Sarah Campbell (designer) =

British textile designer

Sarah Campbell (née Collier) is a textile designer who after studying painting and graphics at Chelsea School of Art, worked with her sister Susan Collier at the Liberty department store in London. Her father was pharmacologist Henry Oswald Jackson Collier and her mother was actress Patience Collier. Her brother is clinical pharmacologist Joe Collier. In 1979, both sisters established their own company 'Collier Campbell', which in 1984 won the Duke of Edinburgh's designer prize. Four years later, they were commissioned by Conran to design the carpets of Gatwick Airport's North Terminal.
