= Christine Lee (academic) =

English medical researcher

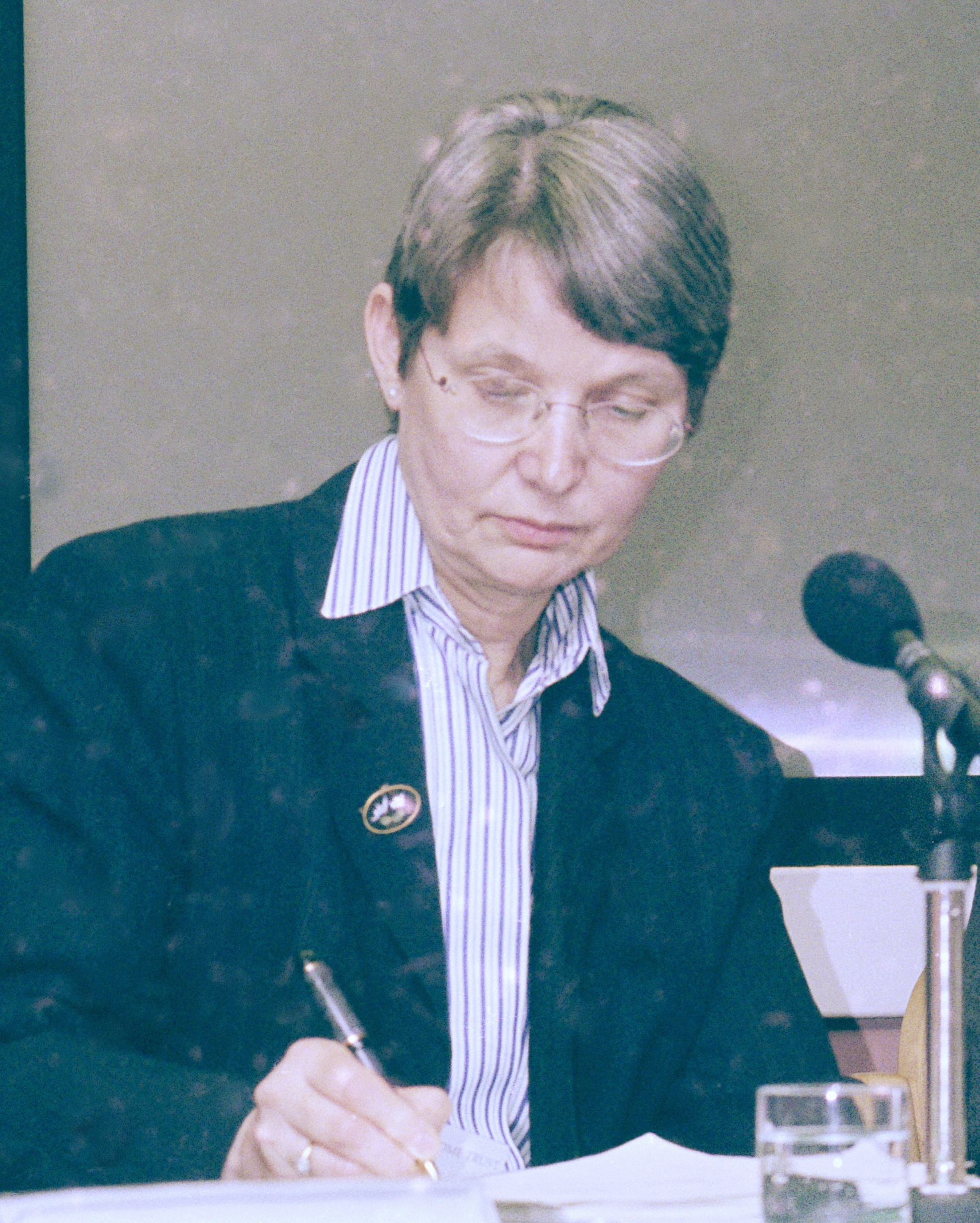
Lee in February 1998

Christine Ann Lee (born 1943) is an English medical researcher. She is Emerita Professor of Haemophilia at the University of London, and co-founding Editor of Haemophilia. She trained in medicine at Somerville College, Oxford, where she was awarded First Class Honours and was the first female scholar of the Oxford University Medical School. She was awarded a Doctorate of Science (Medicine) by the University of London in 1996.

== Life ==
Lee was born in 1943 in Hampton Court. Her father was an electrician, and her mother left school at the age of fourteen. Lee grew up in Richmond, and attended Tiffin Girls' School, where she was head girl. Lee initially enrolled to study chemistry at university, but then switched to medicine during her first year. She trained in medicine at Somerville College, Oxford, where she was awarded First Class Honours and was the first woman scholar of the Oxford University Medical School. She was awarded a Doctorate of Science (Medicine) by the University of London in 1996. Lee is Emerita Professor of Haemophilia at the University of London, and co-founding editor of the journal Haemophilia.

== Evidence to the Infected Blood Inquiry ==
Over two days, 20-21 October 2020, Professor Lee gave evidence in person to the Infected Blood Inquiry. On the second day of her evidence, whilst addressing questions about an Oral History Transcript (THOM0000001), Lee told the inquiry that what she did not "like about the idea of compensation", was that "it suggests liability", but went on to qualify that she believed those who were providing treatment at the time were "doing their best".
