= Catherine Hill =

Catherine Hill (28 August 1893 – 12 August 1983) was a maid and beneficiary who became a well-known eccentric character on the streets and at the railway station of Hamilton in New Zealand.

Hill was born in Brunnerton in New Zealand's West Coast region on 28 August 1893. Her family called her Kitty or Katie. She worked as a live-in maid at a boarding house in Greenwood Street, Frankton, Hamilton, in the 1920s. It appears that she also lived in Palmerston North and Dunedin in the 1930s. She returned to Frankton during World War II, where she lived on an invalid's benefit.

She became a familiar figure on the streets of Frankton and frequented the Hamilton railway station in Frankton. She was known as "Coffee and Bun" for her habit of ordering coffee and a bun at the station. Despite rumours that she was at the station waiting for a fiancé or son who had been killed in a war, a family friend confirmed there was no truth to this.

Hill died in 1983 and was buried in the Hamilton Park Cemetery.

== Further sources ==
- Frankton Oral History Project. Tape recordings. History Department, University of Waikato, Hamilton
- "Obituary". Waikato Times. 27 August 1983. p. 6.
- Dictionary of New Zealand Biography, Catherine Hill
