= Angiotech Pharmaceuticals =

Angiotech Pharmaceuticals Inc
- Company type: Public
- Industry: Pharmaceutical
- Founded: 1992
- Headquarters: Vancouver, British Columbia, Canada
- Key people: K. Thomas Bailey
- Number of employees: 1450
- Website: www.angiotech.com

Angiotech was a pharmaceutical and medical device company in Vancouver, British Columbia, Canada, which as of 2026, is owned by private equity.

== History ==
It was founded in 1992 by William L. Hunter, Lindsay Machan, and Larry Arsenault. It sought to develop innovative technologies and medical products primarily for local diseases and complications associated with medical device implants, surgical interventions and acute injury.

In April 2010, Angiotech acquired Haemacure manufacturing to develop human biological adhesives, hemostats and therapeutic proteins.

In 2017, Angiotech was acquired by a consortium led by the U.S. healthcare investment firm Vivo Capital and China's ZQ Capital.
