= DIPEx Charity =

Dipex is a United Kingdom-based health charity that publishes the websites healthtalk.org, and socialcaretalk.org. Both feature interviews of people sharing their experiences of health and social care.

== History ==
DIPEx was established in 2001 by GP Dr Ann McPherson CBE and clinical pharmacologist Andrew Herxheimer after their own experiences of illness. Ann had been diagnosed with breast cancer and although she knew all the medical information, couldn't find anyone else to talk to about the personal and emotional side of having the disease. This, and Herxheimer's experience of knee replacement surgery, prompted them to come up with the idea of a patient experience website. A small group of people from various backgrounds were asked to join a Steering Group and after many meetings around McPherson's kitchen table, the idea came into being with the help of Lion New Media (part of Lion Television).

The interviews featured on the websites are carried out through in-depth qualitative research. Research is undertaken by many different research institutes.

== Awards and accreditation ==
DIPEx has won six "Commended"s and two "Highly Commended"s from the British Medical Association Patient Information Awards between 2004 and 2009. In 2009 they won "Third Sector Organisation of The Year" from the HealthInvestor Awards. DIPEx has been rated among the top ten online health resources by The Guardian Newspaper in 2004 and one of five health websites included in The Times newspaper's 'Top 50 websites you can't live without' in 2013. healthtalk.org was approved by the (now defunct) Department of Health's Information Standard scheme. In May 2011, McPherson won the British Medical Journal's Health Communicator of the Year Award.

== Supporters ==
Patrons of the charity include Jon Snow and Hugh Grant. Well-known figures have supported the charity including Philip Pullman, Clive Anderson, Thom Yorke, Melvyn Bragg, Dawn French and Michael Palin.
