= Geoffrey T. Franglen =

- Born: 13 May 1925
- Died: 5 October 2004 (aged 79)
- Education: Queen Elizabeth's Grammar School; University of Exeter
- Known for: Photography; Medical School Admissions: Report of a formal investigation into St. George's Hospital Medical School (1988)
- Scientific career
- Fields: Clinical chemistry Contemporary photography
- Workplaces: St George's Hospital, London

Geoffrey Theodore Franglen (13 May 1925 - 5 October 2004) was a British photographer and chemical pathologist at St George's Hospital, London.

== Early life and education ==
Geoffrey T. Franglen was born in 1925 in France. His childhood was spent in Crediton, Devon, where he attended Queen Elizabeth's Grammar School. In 1944 he joined the Royal Naval Reserve as midshipman.

Franglen attended the University of Exeter, where he studied graphic design, lithography and engraving. He later earned a doctorate, became a member of the Royal College of Pathologists and of the Royal Photographic Society.

== Career ==
Franglen was a co-founder and secretary of a group of contemporary photographers, who took part in a touring photography exhibition in the 1960s and early 1970s, called 'Modfot'.

By 1973 he had writtin on a formal statistical method used to determine if research results were genuine or due to chance. He later developed a controversial computer programme at St George's Hospital, that had discriminated against non-Caucasians and female candidates by deliberately reducing their likelihood of being offered an interview. It led to a formal inquiry and report.

== Personal and family ==
Franglen married Venetia, a physiologist at King's College, and after retirement moved to Hereford.

== Death ==
Franglen died on 5 October 2004 in Hereford.

== Selected publications ==
- Franglen, G. T.; McGarry, E.; Spencer, A. G. (July 1953). "Renal function and the excretion of potassium in acute alkalosis". The Journal of Physiology. 121 (1): 35–45. doi:10.1113/jphysiol.1953.sp004928. ISSN 0022-3751. PMC 1366053. PMID 13085297.
- Franglen, G. T.; Martin, N. H. (August 1954). "The interaction of dyes with proteins on paper with special reference to paper electrophoresis". The Biochemical Journal. 57 (4): 626–630. doi:10.1042/bj0570626. ISSN 0264-6021. PMC 1269813. PMID 13198812.
- Franglen, Geoffrey; Gosselin, Cécile (April 1958). "Separation of Metastable Polymers by Starch Gel Electrophoresis". Nature. 181 (4616): 1152–1152. doi:10.1038/1811152a0. ISSN 1476-4687.
- Fraglen, G. (January 1958). "The dye uptake of native and modified serum proteins". Clinica Chimica Acta; International Journal of Clinical Chemistry. 3 (1): 63–67. doi:10.1016/0009-8981(58)90057-3. ISSN 0009-8981.
- Franglen, G. (1 November 1967). "The role of plasma albumin and its relation to its structure". Proceedings of the Royal Society of Medicine. 60 (11 Part 1): 1072–1074. doi:10.1177/003591576706011P105. ISSN 0035-9157. PMC 1902076. PMID 6060690.

== See also ==
- Medical School Admissions: Report of a formal investigation into St. George's Hospital Medical School (1988)
