= Drug and Therapeutics Bulletin =

- Language: English
- Edited by: Gordon Mallarkey

Publication details
- History: 1962-present
- Publisher: BMJ Group
- Frequency: Monthly

Standard abbreviations
- ISO 4: Drug Ther. Bull.

Indexing
- ISSN: 0012-6543 (print); 1755-5248 (web)

Links
- Journal homepage

Drug and Therapeutics Bulletin is a monthly scientific journal with evaluations of, and practical advice on, individual treatments and the overall management of disease. The journal is published by the BMJ Group and as a founder member of The International Society of Drug Bulletins, the journal is also completely independent of the pharmaceutical industry, government and regulatory authorities, advertising and other forms of commercial sponsorship.

== History ==
The first editor was Andrew Herxheimer, followed by Joe Collier, who took on the role in 1992, retiring from it in 2002.
