= International Society of Drug Bulletins =

International health organization

The International Society of Drug Bulletins works to increase the sharing of high quality information on medical treatments and medication between countries. It was started in 1986 and is supported by the World Health Organization.

To be a member publishers must have a certain level of independence from conflicts of interest and publish at least quarterly.

Members include: Australian Prescriber, La revue Prescrire, Drug and Therapeutics Bulletin, Therapeutics Initiative, Worst Pills Best Pills, Arzneiverordnung in der Praxis and Geneesmiddelenbulletin among others.
