= Prescrire =

- Discipline: Medicine, pharmacology
- Language: French

Publication details
- History: 1981–present
- Publisher: Association mieux prescrire (France)
- Frequency: Monthly

Standard abbreviations
- ISO 4: Prescrire

Indexing
- ISSN: 0247-7750
- OCLC no.: 46999191

Links
- Journal homepage

Prescrire also known as La Revue Prescrire is a monthly medical journal in French which addresses developments in diseases, medications, and in medical techniques and technologies. Prescrire contains no advertising, and is internally financed by subscriptions and the sale of various personnel training. In contrast to many traditional medical journals, which review and publish articles submitted by external researchers, Prescrire mainly publishes reviews prepared by its own staff.

It is run by the Association Mieux Prescrire which is a not for profit. It is independent of the pharmaceutical industry. Superlatively, it forbids, rather than merely requiring disclosure of, conflicts of interest, through its "Non Merci..." charter. It is a member of the International Society of Drug Bulletins.

As of 2013 it had 24,700 paying subscribers. It was among the first to warn against the dangers of Mediator. Prescrire also publishes an international edition in English, titled Prescrire International.

== Publication ==
The articles are based on a search of the literature and critical appraisal of the evidence. Each article is peer-reviewed by 20-40 reviewers.

== History ==
The journal was established in 1981 by a group of pharmacists and physicians with a subsidy from the French Ministry of Labour, Employment, and Health.
