= Michael Berridge =

British physiologist and biochemist

Sir Michael Berridge FRS FMedSci FBPhS
- Born: Michael John Berridge; 22 October 1938; Gatooma; Southern Rhodesia
- Died: 13 February 2020 (aged 81)
- Education: University College of Rhodesia and Nyasaland (Bsc); University College (PhD)
- Known for: Cell signaling research Discovery of inositol trisphosphate as second messenger
- Awards: King Faisal International Prize in Science; Louis-Jeantet Prize for Medicine; Knight Bachelor; Canada Gairdner International Award; Albert Lasker Award for Basic Medical Research; Royal Medal; Dr H. P. Heineken Prize for Biochemistry and Biophysics; Shaw Prize in Life Science and Medicine; Wolf Prize in Medicine
- Scientific career
- Fields: Physiology; Biochemistry
- Institutions: University of Virginia; Case Western Reserve University; University of Cambridge; Babraham Institute
- Thesis: The physiology of excretion in the cotton stainer, Dysdercus fasciatus Signoret (Hemiptera, Pyrrhocoridae) (1964)
- Doctoral advisor: Vincent Wigglesworth
- Notable students: Antony Galione

Sir Michael John Berridge FRS FMedSci FBPhS (22 October 1938 – 13 February 2020) was a British physiologist and biochemist. He was known for his work on cell signaling, in particular the discovery that inositol trisphosphate acts as a second messenger, linking events at the plasma membrane with the release of calcium ions (Ca^{2+}) within the cell.

== Early life and education ==
Berridge was born in Gatooma (now Kadoma, Zimbabwe) in Southern Rhodesia (now Zimbabwe). His high school biology teacher convinced him and his parents that he should pursue tertiary education, and he entered the newly founded University of Rhodesia and Nyasaland (now University of Zimbabwe), earning his Bsc in zoology and chemistry in 1960.

He became interested in insect physiology after helping with his physiology professor's research on tsetse flies, and went to the United Kingdom to study with Vincent Wigglesworth, regarded as the father of insect physiology, at the Department of Zoology of the University of Cambridge. Berridge became a member at the Gonville and Caius College, where Wigglesworth was a fellow, and obtained his PhD in 1965.

== Career ==
Initially intending to return to Southern Rhodesia (now Zimbabwe) after his PhD, Berridge's plan was thwarted by the Rhodesian Bush War. He migrated to the United States instead, joining the Department of Biology of the University of Virginia as a postdoctoral fellow. A year later, he moved to the Developmental Biology Center of Case Western Reserve University. He became a research associate under Bodil Schmidt-Nielsen at the Department of Biology of the same university in 1967.

In 1969, John Treherne invited Berridge to return to the University of Cambridge and join the new Unit of Invertebrate Chemistry and Physiology that he was setting up in the Department of Zoology. He first joined as a senior scientific officer, and was promoted to principal scientific officer in 1972. He became a senior principal scientific officer at the Unit of Insect Neurophysiology and Pharmacology, also at the University of Cambridge, in 1978.

In 1990, Berridge joined the Babraham Institute as the Deputy Chief Scientific Officer of the Laboratory of Molecular Signalling, before serving as the Head of Signalling in 1996 until retiring in 2003. After retirement, Berridge was appointed as Babraham's first emeritus Babraham Fellow.

Berridge was a fellow of the Trinity College of the University of Cambridge from 1972 until his death.

Berridge maintained an online textbook on cell signalling, now hosted by Portland Press under the Biochemical Society.

== Research ==
Berridge had been studying cell signaling when he was at Case Western Reserve University, where he received advice from Theodore W. Rall, co-discoverer of the second messenger cyclic AMP with Earl Wilbur Sutherland Jr., who had also worked at Case Western Reserve. Working on the salivary glands of a blow fly species, Berridge showed cyclic AMP produced the same physiological effect as serotonin, dramatically increasing saliva secretion. The idea of second messenger was new at the time, and his finding supported cyclic AMP as a second messenger of serotonin.

He continued studying cyclic AMP after returning to the University of Cambridge, and conducted experiments to study how serotonin and cyclic AMP affected the movement of ions, as ion concentration difference across the salivary gland epithelium controlled the movement of water across the epithelium through osmosis. Berridge measured the difference in electric potential across the epithelium since ions are charged.

Surprisingly, he found that serotonin and cyclic AMP produced opposite effect to ion movement. While the former reduced the transepithelial potential difference closer to zero, the latter caused an even more negative difference. This suggested cyclic AMP caused positively-charged ions to move across the epithelium from the extracellular fluid to the inside of the salivary gland (known as the lumen).

Berridge suspected calcium ions (Ca^{2+}) could explain the distinct electrical but similar physiological effects of serotonin and cyclic AMP. In 1971, Howard Rasmussen, one of the first researchers to recognise the role of Ca^{2+} as a second messenger, was on a sabbatical at Cambridge. He and Rasmussen worked together and found serotonin triggered the release of Ca^{2+} from a storage inside the cell. Later, he confirmed that serotonin activated two distinct receptor system, one through cyclic AMP and the other through Ca^{2+}.

Berridge then wanted to identify the connection between cell surface receptor activation and the release of intracellular Ca^{2+} from storage. He was inspired by a review article by Robert H. Michell in 1975, which proposed receptor activation caused the breakdown of phosphatidylinositol, which in turn opened Ca^{2+} channels on the cell membrane to allowing Ca^{2+} influx into cells. He hypothesised phosphatidylinositol was hydrolysed into a form of inositol phosphate and diglyceride (DAG), and the former was eventually broken down into inositol. He applied lithium ions to blow fly salivary glands to inhibit the conversion of inositol phosphate to inositol.

With help from Rex Malcolm Chaplin Dawson, who was studying inositol at the Babraham Institute near Cambridge, Berridge found that phosphatidylinositol was hydrolysed into IP_{3} and DAG. Later the same year, he confirmed IP_{3} released Ca^{2+} from the intracellular storage, which he identified as the endoplasmic reticulum. This report, together with Yasutomi Nishizuka's discovery that DAG was a second messenger in its own right and could activate protein kinase C, marked the start of the field of calcium signaling.

== Awards and honours ==
- Fellow of the Royal Society (1984)
- King Faisal International Prize in Science (1986)
- Louis-Jeantet Prize for Medicine (1986)
- William Bate Hardy Prize (1987)
- Canada Gairdner International Award (1988)
- Member of the Academia Europaea (1989)
- Baly Medal (1989)
- Albert Lasker Award for Basic Medical Research (1989)
- Member of the European Molecular Biology Organization (1991)
- Honorary foreign member of the Royal Academy of Medicine of Belgium (Académie royale de médecine de Belgique) (1991)
- Royal Medal (1991)
- Ciba-Drew Award for Biomedical Research (now Novartis-Drew Award) (1991)
- Dr H. P. Heineken Prize for Biochemistry and Biophysics (1994)
- Wolf Prize in Medicine (1995)
- Massry Prize (1996)
- Knight Bachelor (1998)
- Honorary Fellow of the Gonville and Caius College, Cambridge (1998)
- Fellow of the Academy of Medical Sciences (1998)
- Ernst Schering Prize (1999)
- International Member of the National Academy of Sciences (1999)
- International Honorary Member of the American Academy of Arts and Sciences (1999)
- Honorary Fellow of the Institute of Biology (now Royal Society of Biology) (2000)
- Honorary Member of the Biochemical Society (2004)
- Shaw Prize in Life Science and Medicine (2005)
- Member of the American Philosophical Society (2007)
- Honorary Fellow of the British Pharmacological Society (2008)

The Sir Michael Berridge Prize at the Babraham Institute was named in his honour and established with his endowment.
