= O. A. Trowell =

English physiologist and radiobiologist

Dr Oswald Arthur Trowell MD FRSE (1909–1967) was a 20th-century English physiologist and radiobiologist. Also an avid amateur naturalist and ornithologist, and accomplished artist, he was affectionately known as Ossie Trowell. In authorship he is O. A. Trowell.

== Life ==
He was born on 19 May 1909. He was educated at King Edward VI School, Birmingham from where he won an Exhibition to study natural sciences at St John's College, Cambridge. He then studied medicine at the University of Birmingham graduating with an MB ChB in 1933. He then returned to St John's College where he was elected a Fellow and appointed Director of Medical Studies. He received his doctorate (MD) in 1943 winning the Raymond Horton-Smith Prize for best thesis.

In 1938 he moved to Edinburgh to lecture in physiology at the University of Edinburgh.

He was elected a Fellow of the Royal Society of Edinburgh in 1944. His proposers were Ivan de Burgh Daly, Philip Eggleton, William Ogilvy Kermack and William Frederick Harvey. He resigned in 1967.

In 1946 he moved to the University of Bristol as Reader in Physiology and in 1948 joined the staff of the Medical Research Council at Harwell in Berkshire. Here he largely studied the effects of radiation on the human body.

He died on 17 November 1967

== Family ==
He was married with two sons, one of whom was also a doctor, the other worked in banking and investment management.

== Publications ==
- Choline and Liver Respiration (1935)
- Watery Vacuolation of the Liver (1946)
- The Sensitivity of Lymphocytes to Ionising Radiation (1952)
- Cells and Tissues in Culture (1964)
