= Babraham Institute =

Life sciences research institution

Coordinates: 52.13310°N 0.20329°E

The Babraham Institute
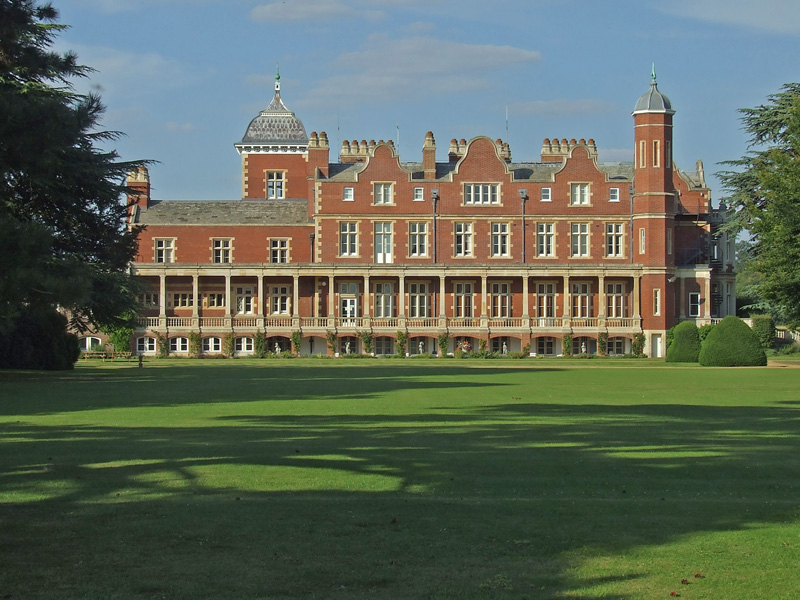
- Formation: 1948
- Location: Babraham Research Campus, Babraham, Cambridgeshire, UK
- Director: Simon Cook
- Key people: Wolf Reik; Martin Turner (scientist); Len Stephens; Phillip Thomas Hawkins
- Affiliations: Biotechnology and Biological Sciences Research Council (BBSRC): UK Research and Innovation (UKRI)
- Staff: ~350
- Website: www.babraham.ac.uk
- Formerly called: Institute of Animal Physiology (IAP); Institute of Animal Physiology and Genetics Research (IAPGR)

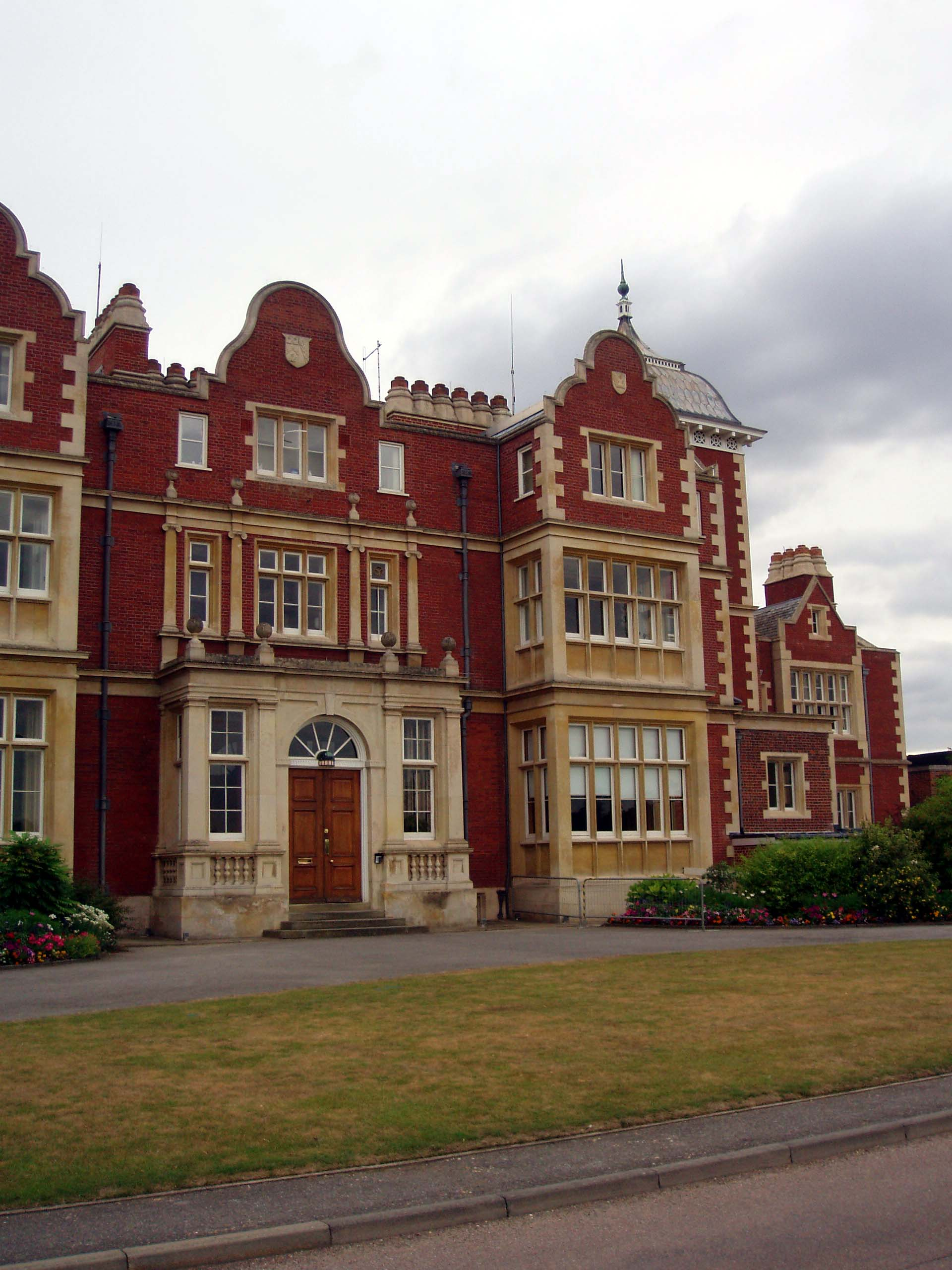
Front of Babraham Hall

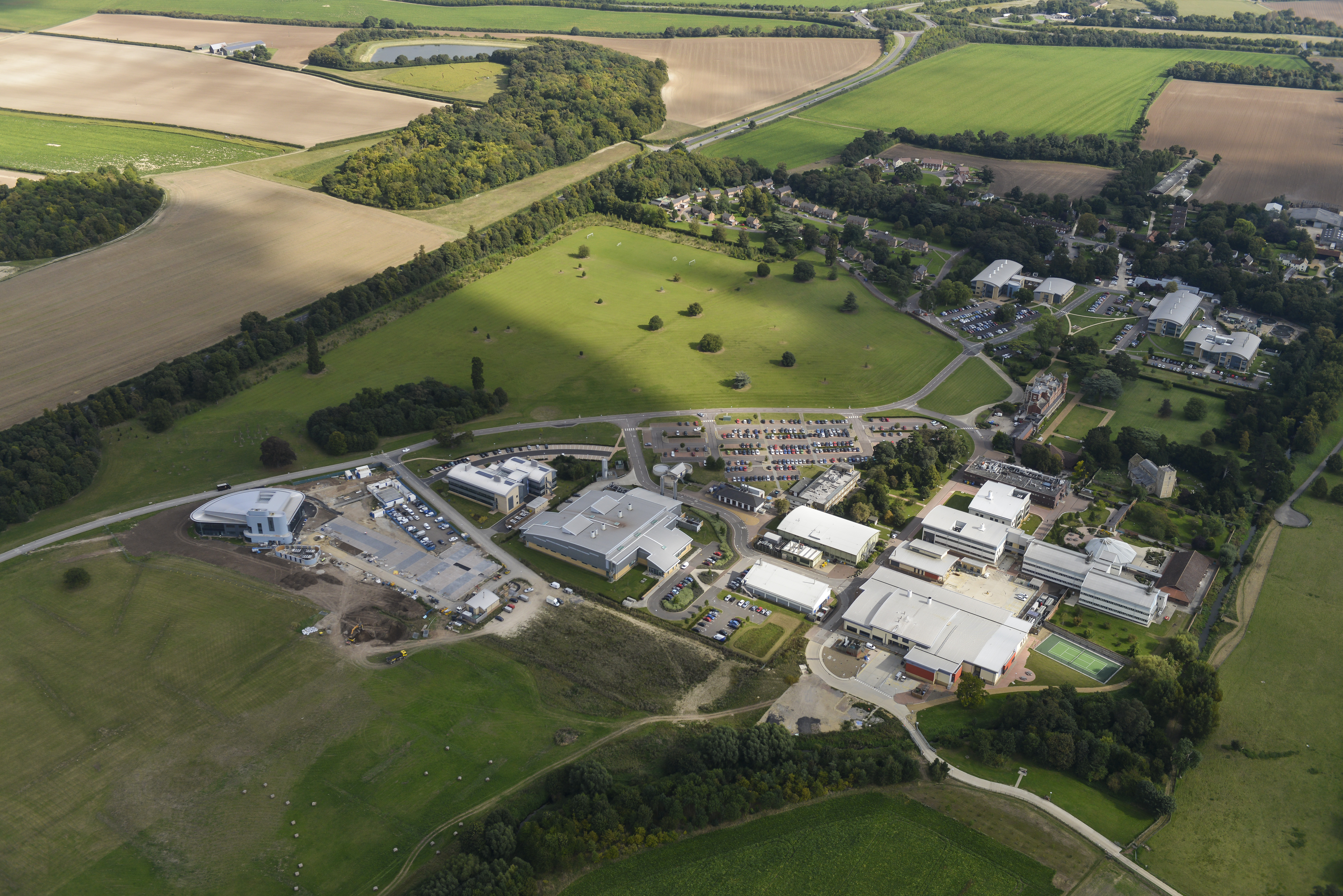
Aerial picture of the Babraham Research Campus in 2014

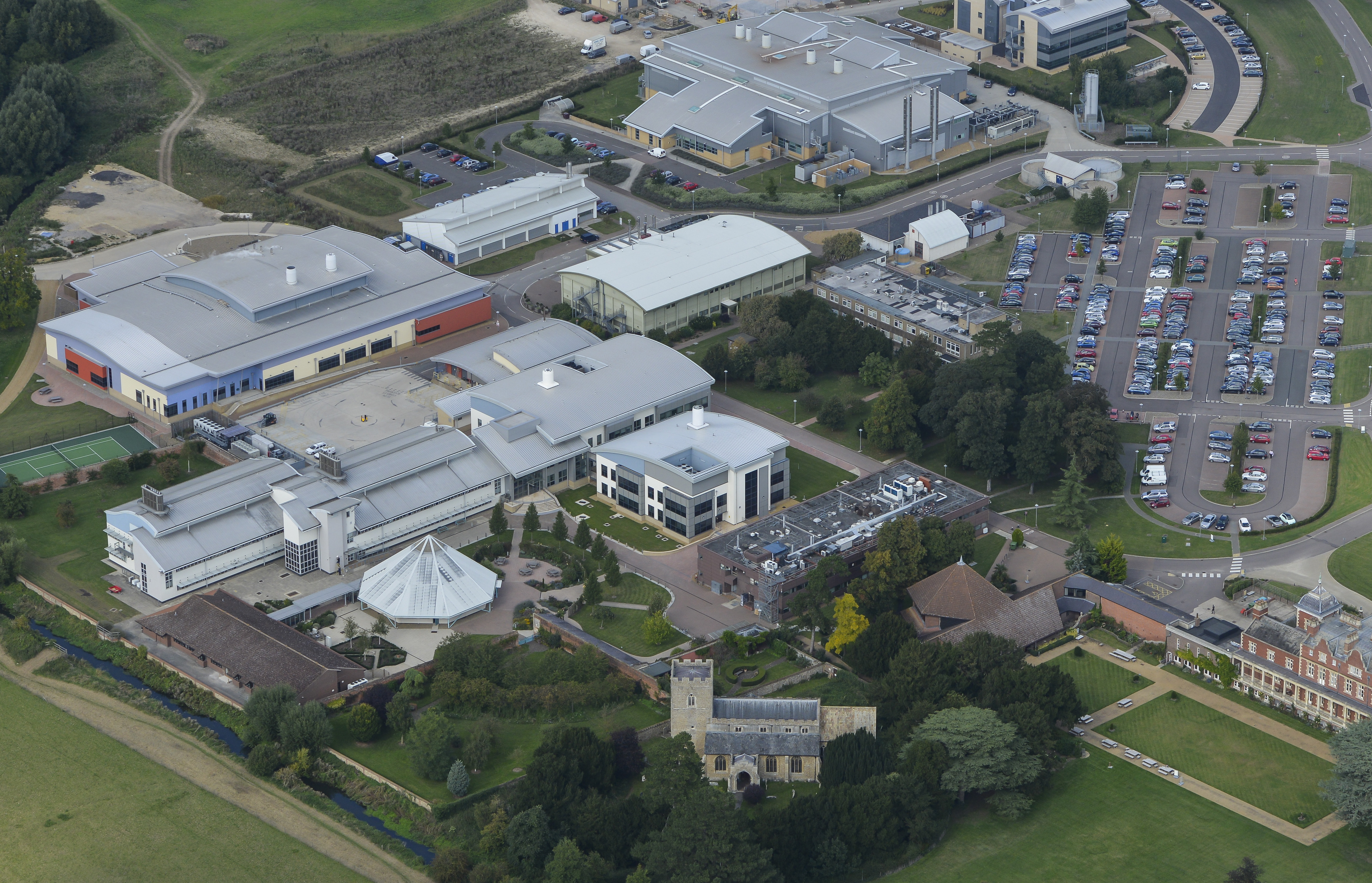
Aerial View of the Babraham institute in 2014

The Babraham Institute is a life sciences research institution focussing on healthy ageing. The Babraham Institute is based on the Babraham Research Campus, partly occupying a former manor house, but also laboratory and science facility buildings on the campus, surrounded by an extensive parkland estate, just south of Cambridge, England. It is an independent and charitable organization which is involved in biomedical research, including healthy aging and molecular biology. The director is Dr Simon Cook who also leads the Institute's signalling research programme.

The Babraham Institute is a member of EU-LIFE, an alliance of leading life sciences research centres in Europe. It is also a partner organisation of the University of Cambridge

== History ==
The institute is located on the historic Babraham Hall Estate (now called the Babraham Research Campus), situated six miles south-east of Cambridge University, near the Gog Magog Hills. It is close to where the ancient Roman Via Devana crossed the prehistoric Icknield Way. The estate includes Babraham Hall, designed in the Jacobean style by Philip Hardwick, which was built between 1832 and 1837. The hall was purchased by the Agricultural Research Council (ARC) in 1948 at the suggestion of Prof Ivan De Burgh Daly, together with 182 hectares of farm and woodland to become the Institute of Animal Physiology, Babraham. Standing adjacent to the grounds of the institute is the active Anglican Church of St Peter, Babraham.

A department of biochemistry was established in 1954 by Sir Rudolph Peters FRS, who had just retired from Oxford University. He invited Rex Dawson to join him the following year.

In 1986, The Institute of Animal Physiology was joined with two Scottish institutes based at Roslin, The Animal Breeding Research Organisation (ABRO) and the Poultry Research Centre, to form The Institute of Animal Physiology and Genetics Research (IAPGR) funded by the Agricultural and Food Research Council (AFRC). In 1993, Roslin and Babraham formed two separate institutes, at which time the Babraham Institute assumed its current name. in 1994, The AFRC was disbanded and The Biotechnology and Biological Sciences Research Council (BBSRC) was formed. All work with direct relevance to agriculture ceased in 1998.

== Research ==
The aim of the research conducted at The Babraham Institute is to study the molecular mechanisms that underlie normal cellular processes and functions, and to understand how these systems are affected by age. The Institute's work also covers how faults or abnormalities in these systems may contribute to disease. The Institute has the status of a postgraduate department within the University of Cambridge and trains PhD students who are registered with the University's Faculty of Biology. The research laboratories of the Institute are structured around three strategic programmes:

- Signalling (headed by Simon Cook): focuses on proteins that play a critical role in controlling communication between and within cells. These proteins make up the signalling pathways that organise how cells and organs develop and react to their environment.
- Immunology (headed by Martin Turner): investigates signal transduction pathways that regulate the survival and activation of lymphocytes.
- Epigenetics (headed by Gavin Kelsey): studies how epigenetic information is introduced into the genome during early development of an organism, which can in part depend on environmental or nutritional factors acting through cell signalling pathways.

Research breakthroughs made at the Babraham Institute include the discovery of liposomes by Alec Bangham, the role of Inositol trisphosphate in the release of calcium from intracellular stores by Michael Berridge, the discovery that genomic imprinting was carried by DNA methylation by Wolf Reik.

Many of its past and current employees were elected fellows of the Royal Society, including (in date order) Drs Sir Rudolph Albert Peters (1935), Ivan de Burgh Daly (1943), Sir John Henry Gaddum (1945), Marthe Vogt (1952), Richard Darwin Keynes (1959), Sir Barry Cross (1975), Rex Malcolm Chaplin Dawson (1981), Sir Robert Brian Heap (1989), M Azim Surani (1990), Robin Francis Irvine (1993), Jonathan Charles Howard (1995), Wolf Reik (2010), Len Stephens (2011), Phil Hawkins (2013).

Babraham Institute Enterprise Ltd (BIE), the wholly owned trading subsidiary of the Babraham Institute promotes knowledge transfer and translation of the Institute’s research discoveries, actively managing and exploiting the Institute’s intellectual property, promoting and negotiating commercial research partnerships and establishing spin-out companies when appropriate.

== Funding ==
The Institute's research programmes are primarily supported by Institute Strategic Programme Grants (ISPGs) awarded by the Biotechnology and Biological Sciences Research Council (BBSRC), part of UK Research and Innovation. Additional grant funding comes from other research councils, such as the MRC, the Wellcome Trust, the European Commission, charitable foundations and medical charities. Some industry funding supports collaborative research projects.

== Directors ==
- 1949-1958 Ivan de Burgh Daly CBE, FRS
- 1958-1965 Sir John Henry Gaddum FRS
- 1965-1972 Richard Darwin Keynes CBE, FRS
- 1973-1989 Sir Barry Albert Cross CBE, FRS
- 1989-1993 Sir Robert Brian Heap CBE, FRS
- 1994-2005 Richard Dyer OBE
- 2005-2007 John Bicknell (acting director)
- 2007–2020 Michael J O Wakelam
- 2020-2021 Wolf Reik FRS (acting and then permanent director)
- 2021- 2022 Simon Cook (interim director)
- 2022- Simon Cook (director)
