= Museum of Bath at Work =

Local history museum in Bath, England

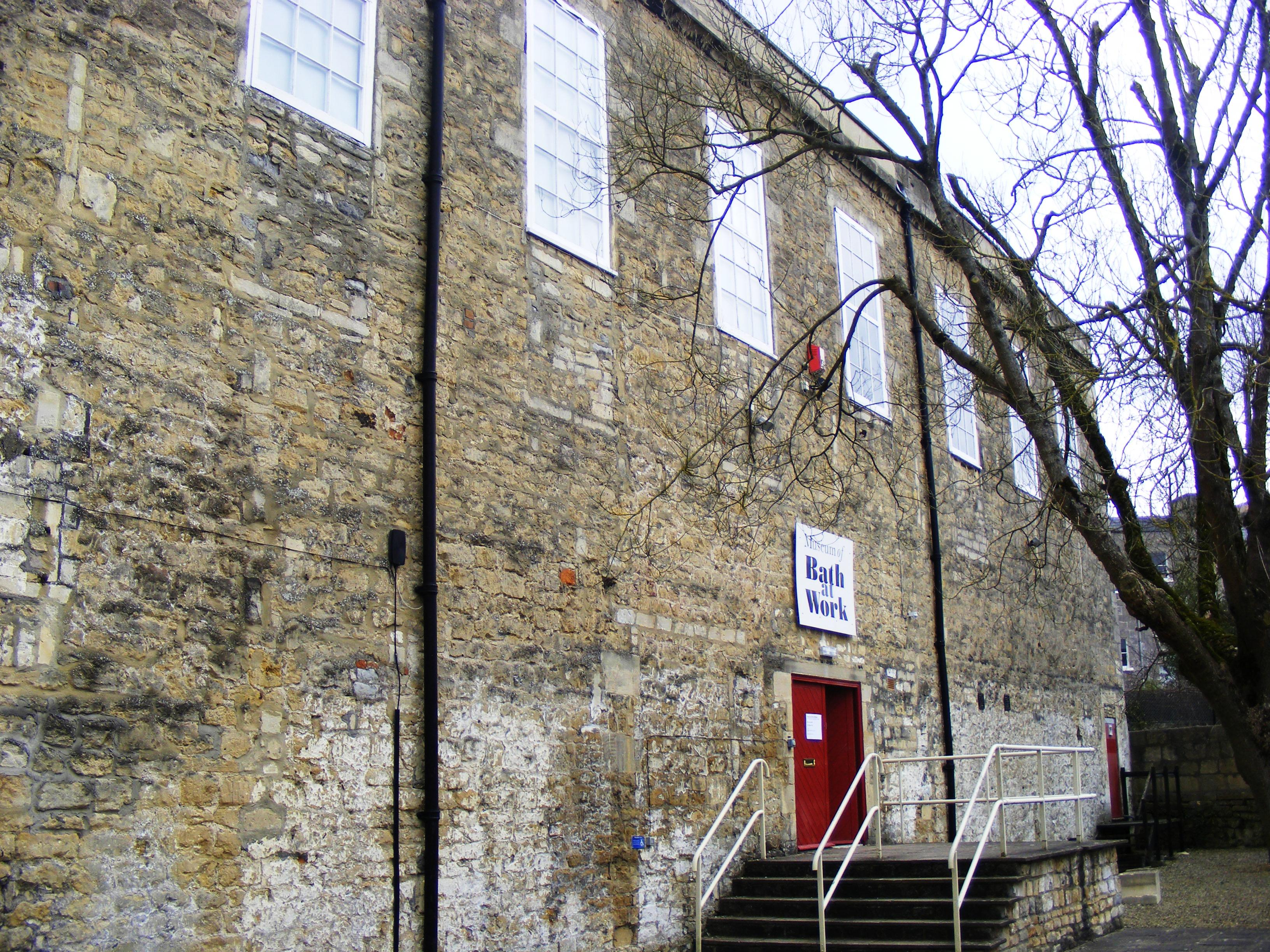

- Location within Somerset and the United Kingdom
- Established: 1978
- Location: Julian Road, Bath, Somerset
- Coordinates: 51.3882°N 2.3625°W
- Director: Stuart Burroughs
- Website: www.bath-at-work.org.uk

The Museum of Bath at Work is a local history museum in Bath, Somerset, England.

The museum was established in 1978 as the Bath Industrial Heritage Trust. Its original collection consisted of a reconstruction of the nineteenth century engineering and mineral water business of Jonathan Burdett Bowler, founded in 1872. When the Bowler firm closed in 1969 its contents were bought by a local businessman, believed to have been Mr Russel Frears, with the express intention of founding a museum. Photographs taken of the original business were used to carefully reconstruct the shop, workshops, offices and bottling plant. Over 10,000 bottles and many thousands of documents were also saved.

Today, the museum seeks to present the commercial development of Bath over a 2000-year period. In addition to the Bowler collection, other reconstructions include a cabinet maker's workshop and a Bath stone quarry face complete with crane and tools. In 1999 a rare 1914 Horstmann car was acquired, and, in 2003, a comprehensive exhibition on Bath's development, 'Bath at Work: 2000 Years of Earning a Living' opened. A local history display in the Hudson Gallery opened in 2007 and features an ever-changing display of photographs. In 2007 the museum acquired a rare Griffin six-stroke gas engine, that had been in storage in Yeovil, Somerset, after having been moved from London in 2001. It was built in 1885 and for some years was in the Birmingham Museum of Science and Technology. It is one of only two known examples, the other being in the Anson Engine Museum.

The museum is housed in the Camden Works building, constructed in 1777 as a court for the indoor game of real tennis.
