= Anglican Diocese of Westminster =

Former diocese of the Church of England 1540–1550

Coordinates: 51.4990°N 0.1281°W

Diocese of Westminster
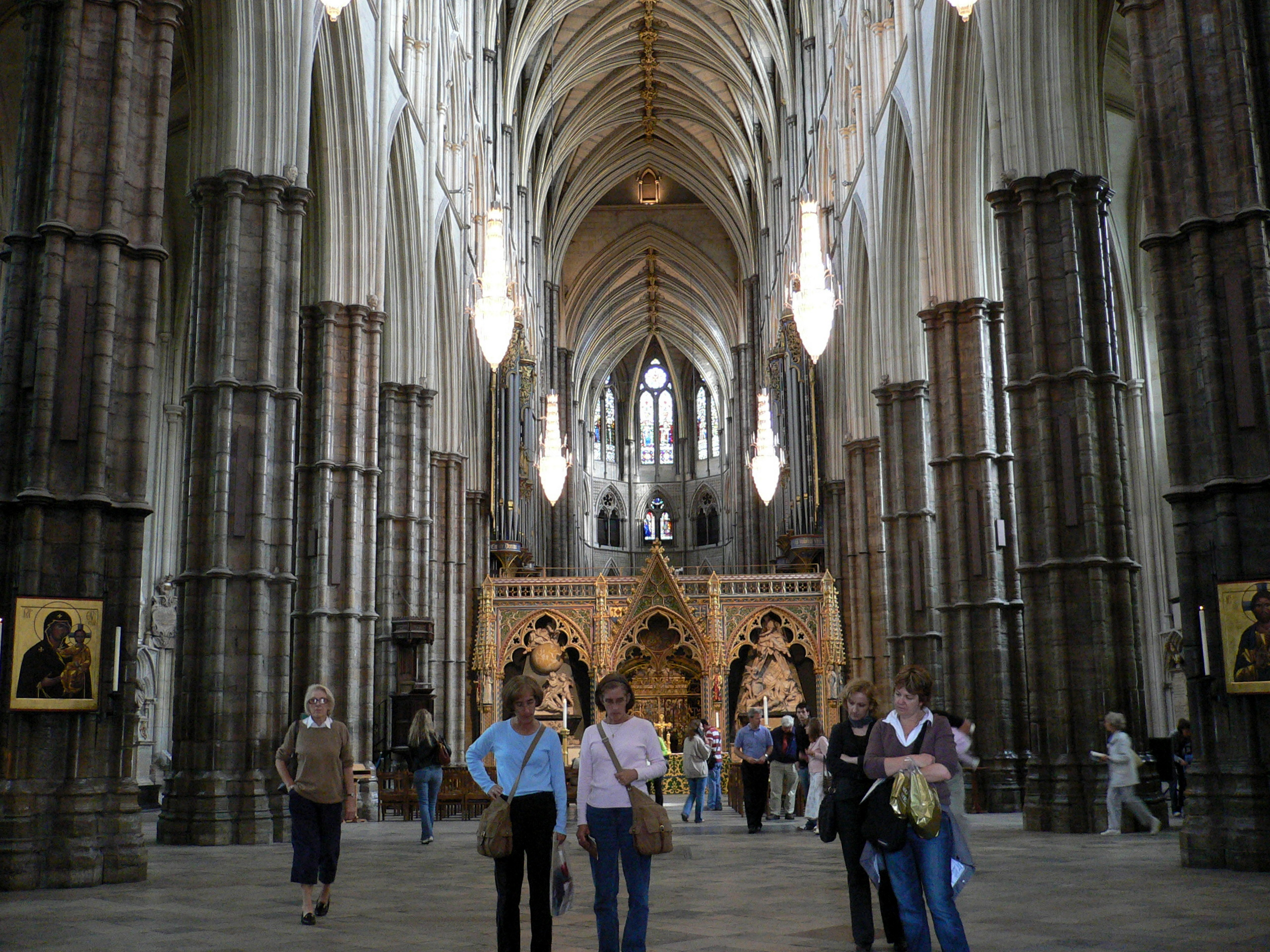
- Westminster Abbey, which served as St Peter's Cathedral of the Diocese of Westminster

Location
- Ecclesiastical province: Canterbury
- Archdeaconries: Middlesex

Information
- Cathedral: Westminster Abbey

The Diocese of Westminster was a short-lived diocese of the Church of England, extant from 1540 to 1550. Westminster Abbey served as its cathedral.

== History ==
The diocese was one of six founded by Henry VIII in 1539–40, with the churches of dissolved abbeys serving as their cathedrals. The others were Bristol, Chester, Gloucester, Oxford and Peterborough.

It was created from part of the Diocese of London, and comprised Westminster (which was raised to the dignity of a city), and the county of Middlesex, with the exception of Fulham. Fulham was excluded as it was the site of Fulham Palace, residence of the Bishop of London.

Henry established the new diocese by letters patent of 17 December 1540, which reconstituted the former monastery of St Peter, Westminster (today generally known simply as "Westminster Abbey") as a cathedral, with a bishop, dean and twelve canons. Thomas Thirlby was appointed as the bishop and William Benson or Boston, who had been abbot of Westminster before the Dissolution, became dean; the Middlesex archdeaconry moved into the jurisdiction of the new diocese and bishop.

In 1550 the diocese of Westminster was reunited with that of London. Thirlby surrendered the diocese on 30 March and was made Bishop of Norwich, while Nicholas Ridley became Bishop of London and Westminster. In 1552 an act of parliament of confirmed the status of Westminster as a "cathedral church and episcopal see to the bishop of London". Westminster Abbey finally lost its cathedral status in 1556, during the reign of Queen Mary, when the chapter was abolished and the monastery restored.

A Catholic Diocese of Westminster was formed in 1850.

== Bishops ==
The ordinary of the diocese throughout its existence was the Bishop of Westminster; the only incumbent was Thomas Thirlby, whose sole seat was at Westminster Abbey. When the diocese was merged back into London diocese, the Bishop of London Ridley was called "Bishop of London and Westminster."
