= John Hullier =

John Hullier or Hulliarde, Huller or Hullyer, (c. 1520 – 16 April 1556) was an English clergyman and a Protestant martyr under Mary I of England.

Hullier was a chorister in the Choir of King's College, Cambridge before attending Eton College and then returning to King's College, Cambridge as an undergraduate. Hullier became vicar of the Church of St Peter in Babraham, Cambridgeshire in 1549 until he was deprived in February 1556. He is remembered in a memorial plaque installed in the church.

For his preaching in King's Lynn Hullier was taken to Thomas Thirlby, Bishop of Ely, who sent him to Cambridge. Hullier was examined on Palm Sunday eve 28 March before a body of divines and lawyers headed by Nicholas Shaxton, at Great St Mary's, Cambridge.

On Maundy Thursday, 16 April 1556 Hullier was burned at the stake on Jesus Green, Cambridge for refusing to renounce the Protestant faith.
