= Wolf Reik =

German molecular biologist

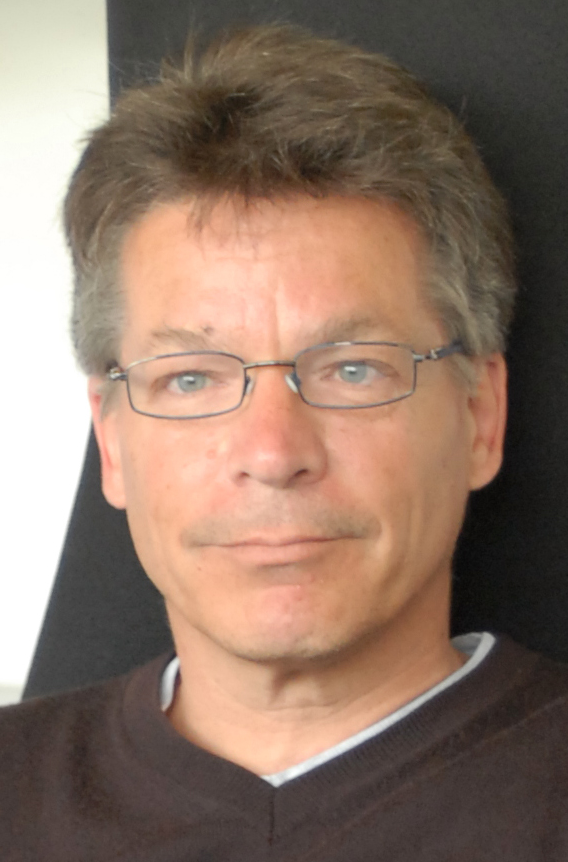
- Wolf Reik
- Awards: EMBO Member; FMedSci; FRS
- Scientific career
- Fields: epigenetics
- Workplaces: Babraham Institute; University of Cambridge, Wellcome Trust Sanger Institute
- Website: www.babraham.ac.uk/our-research/epigenetics/wolf-reik

Wolf Reik FRS is a German-British molecular biologist and an honorary group leader at the Babraham Institute, honorary professor of Epigenetics at the University of Cambridge and associate faculty at the Wellcome Trust Sanger Institute. He was announced as the director of Altos Labs Cambridge Institute when the company launched on 19 January 2022.

== Early life and education ==
Reik is the first child of four of Rosemarie Reik (nee Heiles) and Helmut Gottlieb Reik (https://de.wikipedia.org/wiki/Helmut_Reik) who were both physicists. Reik was born in Aachen on 22nd August 1957, attended primary school in Braunschweig, and secondary school in Freiburg. Reik studied Physics and Medicine at the University of Freiburg and completed his medical degree at the University of Hamburg. He obtained his MD in the lab of Rudolf Jaenisch and did postdoctoral work in the lab of Azim Surani.

== Career and research ==
Wolf Reik studies how additional information can be added to the genome through a range of processes collectively called epigenetics. He discovered some of the key epigenetic mechanisms important for mammalian development, physiology, genome reprogramming, and human diseases. His early work led to the discovery that the molecular mechanism of genomic imprinting is based on DNA methylation. He uncovered non-coding RNA and chromatin looping regulating imprinted genes, which he showed to be involved in fetal nutrition, growth, and disease. He found that the environment influences epigenetic programming in embryos, with changes in gene expression persisting in adults and their offspring.With his collaborators he discovered global epigenetic reprogramming in early embryos and in primordial germ cells10. He found that adult human cells could be substantially rejuvenated by epigenetic reprogramming induced by transient treatment with Yamanaka reprogramming factors11.

=== Awards and honours ===
Wolf Reik has received many awards, including:

- 2011, elected member of the Academia Europaea
- 2010, elected Fellow of the Royal Society
- 2003, elected to EMBO Membership at the European Molecular Biology Organisation
- 2003 Elected Fellow of the Academy of Medical Sciences (FMedSci)
- 1994 awarded the Wellcome Prize in Physiology

== See also ==
- Chronomics
