= Martin Turner (scientist) =

- Education: University College London (BSc); University of London (PhD)
- Scientific career
- Fields: immunology, molecular biology
- Workplaces: Babraham Institute; Cambridge Stem Cell Institute; National Institute for Medical Research; Kennedy Institute of Rheumatology/Sunley Research centre, University of Oxford
- Thesis: Regulation of cytokine gene expression (1990)
- Website: www.babraham.ac.uk/our-research/lymphocyte/martin-turner

Martin Turner is a British molecular biologist and immunologist and Head of the Immunology Programme at the Babraham Institute. His work has helped identify key molecular processes involved in the development of the immune system and its response to pathogens. His work has included research the fundamental mechanisms regulating gene expression by cells of the immune system.

== Career ==
Turner graduated in Biochemistry from University College London and went on to complete a PhD with Professor Sir Marc Feldmann studying the regulation of cytokine gene expression. Subsequently, he joined the MRC National Institute for Medical Research, working with Victor Tybulewicz before joining the Babraham Institute in 1997. Turner became Head of the Lymphocyte Signalling & Development Programme at the Institute in 2005. In 2021, this became the Immunology Programme.

== Research ==
During his PhD, Turner contributed to his fundamental research that led to the identification of TNF as a potential drug target for the treatment of rheumatoid arthritis.

He went on to work on identifying elements of signal transduction pathways that are needed inside cells to promote proper development of lymphocytes. His work has continued to focus in this area and has included identifying roles for phosphoinositide-3-kinase (PI3K) in lymphocyte development and activation. This work has helped to underpin the development of PI3K delta inhibitors in treating human cancers.

Recent work by his group seeks to understand how RNA-processing mechanisms control the development and function of B and T lymphocytes. In particular, Turner is interested in RNA-binding proteins and microRNAs (particularly miR-155 and how these function within signal transduction networks to control cell differentiation and immunity.
