= Phillip Thomas Hawkins =

British scientist

Phill Hawkins
- Scientific career
- Fields: immunology, signal transduction
- Workplaces: Babraham Institute

Phillip (Phill) Thomas Hawkins FRS (born 5 October 1958) is a molecular biologist, senior group leader at the Babraham Institute.

Phill Hawkins has contributed much to the understanding of inositol lipids functions in eukaryotic cells. Together with his long-time collaborator Leonard R Stephens, he established that PtdIns(4,5)P2 is the main substrate of receptor-controlled Type 1 phosphoinositide 3-kinases (PI3Ks), thus identifying PtdIns(3,4,5)P3 as the key output signal produced by this enzyme. They identified and isolated the GPCR-activated Type 1B PI3K (PI3KΥ) and, in a sustained body of work, defined its structure, explained its complex pattern of regulation by GβΥ and Ras, and proved its role in inflammatory events in vivo. They - in parallel with Dario Alessi - identified phosphoinositide-dependent kinase-1 as the PtdIns(3,4,5)P3-activated link between PI3K-1 activation and protein kinase B activation, a key pathway through which PtdIns(3,4,5)P3 formation regulates cell proliferation and survival.

== Life ==
Phill Hawkins received a BSc in Biochemistry from the University of Bristol (1980) and a PhD in Biochemistry (1983) from the University of Birmingham. After a post-doctoral training in S.K. & F. Research Ltd, he joined the Molecular Neurobiology unit of the MRC in Cambridge (UK). He joined the AFRC IAPGR (now Babraham Institute) in 1990 and became a group leader in 2003.

== Awards and recognition ==
Phill Hawkins has received several awards, including:

- 2013, elected Fellow of the Royal Society of London
