= Rex Malcolm Chaplin Dawson =

British biochemist (1924-2021)

Rex Malcolm Chaplin Dawson FRS
- Born: 3 June 1924; Stoke Golding, Leicestershire
- Died: 29 March 2021 (aged 96); Langham, Norfolk
- Education: Hinckley Grammar School
- Alma mater: University College London
- Known for: Work on how phospholipids govern membrane biology
- Spouses: Emily Elizabeth Hodder; June Margaret Buschman (née Pepper)
- Children: Hazel Anne; John Rex
- Awards: FRS
- Scientific career
- Institutions: Cardiff University; University of Oxford; Babraham Institute
- Thesis: (1949)
- Doctoral advisor: Derek Richter

Rex Malcolm Chaplin Dawson FRS (1924–2021) was a British biochemist whose research was primarily dedicated to the study of phospholipids. His career was based at the Babraham Institute, Cambridge, starting in 1955, in the newly formed biochemistry department.

He served as honorary publications secretary for The Biochemical Society (1973–1980), and was elected Fellow of the Royal Society in 1981.

== Biography ==
Rex Malcom Chaplin Dawson was born on 3 June 1924 in Stoke Golding, Leicestershire, the second son of James Dawson, newspaperman, and Ethel Mary (née Chaplin), teacher of music, English and art. When he was 11 the family moved to nearby Hinckley, where Dawson attended the local Grammar School. There, "he gained a sudden early fascination with science" after reading Wonders of Chemistry. He gained a scholarship to University College London (UCL) and was awarded first class honours for his degree in applied and theoretical physics in 1945.

He then moved to Cardiff to join Derek Richter's group at Whitchurch Hospital. His work there on the metabolism of the brain earned him a PhD in 1949. Dawson stayed on at Cardiff, doing further work on the metabolism of phospholipids. He then moved in 1952 to the biochemistry department at Oxford where he continued his investigations, leading to the publication of an important paper.

The head of his department, Sir Rudolph Peters FRS retired in 1954 and went on set up a new department of biochemistry at the Agricultural Research Council Animal Physiology Unit at Babraham. Peters had noted Dawson's talent, and offered him a position in the new organisation in 1955. Dawson moved to Babraham and remained for thirty years.

Dawson was honorary publications secretary for The Biochemical Society from 1973 to 1980. His contributions to the future of the organization were key: "With his fellow officers of the society, Rex played a major role in getting things onto a more secure financial and administrative basis, a legacy that continues to this day in a flourishing society".

== Family ==
Rex Dawson married Emily Elizabeth Hodder in Edmonton, London in the summer of 1946. Their two children, Hazel Anne and John Rex, were born in Bristol in 1947 and Cardiff in 1951 respectively:

- Anne, a physiologist, married David Atherton; their son Joe does research on microtubules at King's College London.
- John Rex (more usually Rex) is an Emeritus Consultant Cardiologist, Barts Health NHS Trust.

Emily Elizabeth Dawson died on 29 September 2005. In 2009, Rex Malcom Chaplin Dawson married June Margaret Buschman (née Pepper), who had lost her husband Petrus in 2004. Rex died on 29 March 2021 in Langham, Norfolk.
