= Brian Heap =

British biologist (born 1935)

Sir Robert Brian Heap CBE FRS (born 27 February 1935) is a British biological scientist.

He was educated at New Mills Grammar School in the Peak District, Derbyshire, and the University of Nottingham (where he earned his BSc and PhD). He has an MA and a ScD from the University of Cambridge and Honorary DScs from Nottingham (1994), York (2001) and St Andrews (2007).

== Career ==
- 1960: University Demonstrator, University of Cambridge
- 1963: Lalor Research Fellow, ARC Institute of Physiology, Babraham Institute, Cambridge
- 1964-95: Staff Member, AFRC Institute of Physiology, Babraham, serving as Head, Dept of Physiology, 1976; Head of Cambridge Research Station, 1986; Director Institute of Animal Physiology and Genetics Research, Cambridge and Edinburgh, 1989–93; Director of Science, BBSRC, Swindon 1991–94 and Director BBSRC Babraham Institute, 1993–94.
- 1994-2001: visiting senior fellow, School of Clinical Medicine, University of Cambridge.

Heap's primary research interest was in reproductive biology and the function of hormones in reproduction. His research into the control of pregnancy, birth and lactation led to important contributions in endocrine physiology and farm animal breeding. He has published on endocrine physiology, biotechnology, sustainable consumption and production, and science advice for policy makers.

He was the Master of St Edmund's College, University of Cambridge, from 1996 until 2004 and has been a Special Professor in Animal Physiology at the University of Nottingham since 1988 until 2016. He was elected a fellow of the Royal Society in 1989, and held the post of Royal Society Vice President and Foreign Secretary from 1996 to 2001. He was Executive Editor of the Philosophical Transactions of the Royal Society, Series B from 2004-2007. He is a founder member of the International Society for Science and Religion and an Associate of the Faraday Institute for Science and Religion.

Brian Heap was President of the Institute of Biology (now Royal Society of Biology) 1996-1998, UK Representative on the European Science Foundation Strasbourg, 1994–97, a member of the Nuffield Council on Bioethics 1996-2001, UK Representative on the NATO Science Committee 1998-2005, member of the Scientific Advisory Panel for Emergency Responses (SAPER) at the Cabinet Office, Chairman of the Cambridge Genetics Knowledge Park and Public Health Genetics, 2002-2010, and President of the European Academies' Science Advisory Council, 2010-2014. He was co-Project Leader of Biosciences for Farming in Africa, 2014–17, and senior adviser of Smart Villages from 2017.

In 1994, he was awarded CBE, and, in 2001, knighted for services to international science.

On 8 October 2007, the Duke of Edinburgh opened three new buildings at St Edmund's College, Cambridge, one of which was named the "Brian Heap Building".
