= Thomas Thirlby =

English bishop

The Right Reverend Thomas Thirlby DD DCn CL
- Bishop of Ely
- Church: Church of England
- Province: Canterbury
- Diocese: Ely
- In office: 1554–1559
- Predecessor: Thomas Goodrich
- Successor: Richard Cox
- Previous posts: Bishop of Norwich 1550–1554; Bishop of Westminster 1540–1550; Archdeacon of Ely 1534–1540

Orders
- Consecration: 19 December 1540 by Edmund Bonner

Personal details
- Born: c. 1506 Cambridge
- Died: 26 August 1570 (aged c. 64) Lambeth Palace
- Buried: St Mary's Church, Lambeth
- Denomination: Roman Catholic
- Parents: John and Joan Thirleby
- Education: Trinity Hall, Cambridge

Thomas Thirlby (or Thirleby; c. 1506–1570), was the first and only bishop of Westminster (1540–50), and afterwards successively bishop of Norwich (1550–54) and bishop of Ely (1554–59). While he acquiesced in the Henrician schism, with its rejection in principle of the Roman papacy, he remained otherwise loyal to the doctrine of the Roman Catholic Church during the English Reformation.

== Life ==
Thomas, was the son of John Thirleby, scrivener and town clerk of Cambridge, and Joan his wife, and was born in the parish of St. Mary the Great, Cambridge, in or about 1506. He received his education at Trinity Hall, Cambridge, graduated bachelor of the civil law in 1521, was elected a fellow of his college, and proceeded doctor of the civil law in 1528, and doctor of the canon law in 1530. It is said that while at the university he, with other learned men who were the favourers of the gospel, though they afterwards relapsed, received an allowance from Queen Anne Boleyn, the Earl of Wiltshire, her father, and Lord Rochford, her brother. In 1532 he was official to the archdeacon of Ely. He appears to have taken a prominent part in the affairs of the university between 1528 and 1534, and is supposed to have held the office of commissary. In 1534 he was appointed provost of the collegiate church of St. Edmund at Salisbury. Archbishop Cranmer and Dr. Butts, physician to the king, were his early patrons. Cranmer "liked his learning and his qualities so well that he became his good lord towards the king's majesty, and commended him to him, to be a man worthy to serve a prince, for such singular qualities as were in him. And indeed the king soon employed him in embassies in France and elsewhere: so that he grew in the king's favour by the means of the archbishop, who had a very extraordinary love for him, and thought nothing too much to give him or to do for him."

In 1533 he was one of the king's chaplains, and in May communicated to Cranmer "the king's commands" relative to the sentence of divorce from Catherine of Aragon. In 1534 he was presented by the king to the archdeaconry of Ely, and he was a member of the convocation which recognised the king's supremacy in ecclesiastical matters. Soon afterwards he was appointed dean of the chapel royal, and in 1536 one of the members of the council of the north. On 29 September 1537 the king granted to him a canonry and prebend in the collegiate church of St. Stephen, in the palace of Westminster, and on the 15th of the following month he was present at the christening of Prince Edward (afterwards Edward VI) at Hampton Court. On 2 May 1538 a royal commission was issued to Stephen Gardiner, Sir Francis Brian, and Thirlby, as ambassadors, to treat with Francis I, king of France, not only for a league of friendship, but for the projected marriage of the Princess Mary to the Duke of Orleans. The three ambassadors were recalled in August 1538. Thirlby was one of the royal commissioners appointed on 1 October 1538 to search for and examine anabaptists. On 23 December 1539 he was presented to the mastership of the hospital of St. Thomas à Becket in Southwark, and on 14 January 1539/40 he surrendered that house, with all its possessions, to the king. At this period he was prebendary of Yeatminster in the cathedral church of Salisbury, and rector of Ribchester, Lancashire. In 1540 he was prolocutor of the convocation of the province of Canterbury, and signed the decree declaring the nullity of the king's marriage with Anne of Cleves. In the same year he was one of the commissioners appointed by the king to deliberate upon sundry points of religion then in controversy, and especially upon the doctrine of the sacraments.

By letters patent dated 17 December 1540 the king erected the abbey of Westminster into an episcopal see, and appointed Thirlby the first and, as it happened, the last bishop of the new Diocese of Westminster. He was consecrated on 29 December in St. Saviour's Chapel in the cathedral church of Westminster. Soon afterwards he was appointed by the convocation to revise the translation of the epistles of St. James, St. John, and St. Jude. In January 1540–1 he interceded with the crown for the grant of the university of the house of Franciscan friars at Cambridge. In 1542 he appears as a member of the privy council, and was also despatched as ambassador to the emperor in Spain. He returned the same year. In April 1543 he took part in the revision of the "Institution of a Christian Man", and on 17 June in that year he was one of those empowered to treat with the Scots ambassador concerning the proposed marriage of Prince Edward with Mary, Queen of Scots. In May 1545 he was despatched on an embassy to the emperor, Charles V. He attended the diet of Bourbourg, and on 16 January 1546–7 he was one of those who signed a treaty of peace at Utrecht. He was not named an executor by Henry VIII and consequently was excluded from Edward VI's privy council. He remained at the court of the emperor till June 1548, taking leave of Charles V at Augsburg on the 11th. Thirlby took part in the important debates in the House of Lords in December 1548 and January 1548–9 on the subject of the sacrament of the altar and the sacrifice of the mass. He declared that "he did never allow the doctrine" laid down in the communion office of the proposed first Book of Common Prayer, stating that he mainly objected to the book as it stood because it abolished the "elevation" and the "adoration". When Somerset expressed to Edward VI some disappointment at Thirlby's attitude, the young king remarked, "I expected nothing else but that he, who had been so long time with the emperor, should smell of the Interim." He voted against the third reading of the act of uniformity on 15 January 1548–9, but enforced its provisions in his diocese after it had been passed. On 12 April 1549 he was in the commission for the suppression of heresy, and on 10 November in that year he was ambassador at Brussels with Sir Philip Hoby and Sir Thomas Cheyne. On 29 March 1550 Thirlby resigned the bishopric of Westminster into the hands of the king, who thereupon dissolved it, and reannexed the county of Middlesex, which had been assigned for its diocese, to the see of London. While bishop of Westminster he is said to have "impoverished the church."

On 1 April, following his resignation of the see of Westminster, he was constituted bishop of Norwich. Bishop Burnet intimates that Thirlby was removed from Westminster to Norwich, as it was thought he could do less mischief in the latter see, "for though he complied as soon as any change was made, yet he secretly opposed everything while it was safe to do." In January 1550–1 he was appointed one of the commissioners to correct and punish all anabaptists, and such as did not duly administer the sacraments according to the Book of Common Prayer; and on 15 April 1551 one of the commissioners to determine a controversy respecting the borders of England and Scotland. On 20 May following he was in a commission to treat for a marriage between the king and Elizabeth, daughter of Henry II of France. He was in 1551 appointed one of the masters of requests, and he was also one of the numerous witnesses on the trial of Gardiner, bishop of Winchester, which took place in that year. In January and March 1551–2 his name was inserted in several commissions appointed to inquire what sums were due to the king or his father for sale of lands; to raise money by the sale of crown lands to the yearly value of 1,000£; and to survey the state of all the courts erected for the custody of the king's lands. In April 1553 he was again appointed ambassador to the Emperor Charles V, at whose court he remained until April 1554. On his return from Germany he brought with him one Remegius, who established a paper mill in this country—perhaps at Fen Ditton, near Cambridge.

At heart a Roman Catholic, Thirlby was soon high in Queen Mary II's favour, and in July 1554 he was translated from Norwich to Ely, the temporalities of the latter see being delivered to him on 15 September. He was one of the prelates who presided at the trials of Bishop Hooper, John Rogers, Rowland Taylor, and others, for heresy; and in February 1554–5 he was appointed, together with Anthony Browne, 1st Viscount Montagu, and Sir Edward Carne, a special ambassador to the pope, to make the queen's obedience, and to obtain a confirmation of all those graces which Cardinal Pole had granted in his name. He returned to London from Rome on 24 August 1555 with a bull confirming the queen's title to Ireland, which document he delivered to the lord treasurer on 10 December. A curious journal of this embassy is printed in Lord Hardwicke's State Papers.

After the death of the lord chancellor, Gardiner, on 12 November 1555, Mary proposed to confer on Thirlby the vacant office, but Philip objected, and Archbishop Heath was appointed. In January 1555–6 Thirlby took a part in the degradation of his old friend Archbishop Cranmer. "He was observed to weep much all the while; he protested to Cranmer that it was the most sorrowful action of his whole life, and acknowledged the great love and friendship that had been between them; and that no earthly consideration but the queen's command could have induced him to come and do what they were then about." On 22 March following he was one of the seven bishops who assisted at the consecration of Cardinal Pole as archbishop of Canterbury. In 1556 he was appointed to receive Osep Napea Gregoriwitch (ru), ambassador from the emperor of Russia. Thirlby appears to have sanctioned the burning of John Hullier for heresy in 1556, but only two others, William Wolsey and Robert Pygot of Wisbech, suffered death in his diocese on account of their religion, and it has been said that "Thirleby was in no way interested therein; but the guilt thereof must be shared between Dr. Fuller, the chancellor, and other commissioners." In April 1558 Thirlby was sent to the north to inquire the cause of the quarrel between the Earls of Northumberland and Westmoreland. He and Dr. Nicholas Wotton were Queen Mary's commissioners to treat with France respecting the restoration of Calais and the conclusion of peace. Queen Elizabeth I sent a new commission to them at Cambray in January 1558–9, and instructed the Earl of Arundel to act in conjunction with them. The commissioners succeeded in concluding peace, and returned home in April 1559. The queen is said to have cast upon Thirlby the entire blame of the eventual loss of Calais. Queen Mary had appointed him one of her executors.

On the assembling of Queen Elizabeth's first parliament Thirlby sent his proxy, he being then absent on his embassy in France. On 17 April 1559 the bill for restoring ecclesiastical jurisdiction to the crown was committed to him and other peers. He opposed this measure on the third reading. He also dissented from the bill for uniformity of common prayer. He refused to take the oath of supremacy, and for this reason he and Archbishop Heath were deposed from their sees on 5 July 1559 at the lord-treasurer's house in Broad Street.

According to Bentham, Thirlby was a considerable benefactor to the see of Ely because by his interest he procured from the crown for himself and his successors the patronage of the prebends in the cathedral; but Dr. Cox, his immediate successor, asserted that although Thirlby received £500 from Bishop Goodrich's executors for dilapidations, he left his houses, bridges, lodes, rivers, causeways, and banks, in great ruin and decay, and spoiled the see of a stock of one thousand marks, which his predecessors had enjoyed since the reign of Edward III. He also alleged that Thirlby never came into his diocese.

After his deprivation Thirlby had his liberty for some time, but in consequence of his persisting in preaching against the Reformation, he was on 3 June 1560 committed to the Tower, and on 25 February 1560–1 he was excommunicated. In September 1563 he was removed from the Tower on account of the plague to Archbishop Parker's house at Beaksbourne. In June 1564 he was transferred to Lambeth Palace, and Parker, who is said to have treated Thirlby with great courtesy and respect, even permitted him to lodge for some time at the house of one Mrs. Blackwell in Blackfriars. He died in Lambeth Palace on 26 August 1570. He was buried on the 28th in the chancel of Lambeth church, under a stone with a brief Latin inscription in brass. In making a grave for the burial of Archbishop Cornwallis in March 1783, the body of Bishop Thirlby was discovered in his coffin, in a great measure undecayed, as was the clothing. The corpse had a cap on its head and a hat under its arm. His portrait is in the print of the delivery of the charter of Bridewell.
