= St Peter's Church, Babraham =

Historic Anglican church in Babraham, Cambridgeshire

Church of St Peter, Babraham
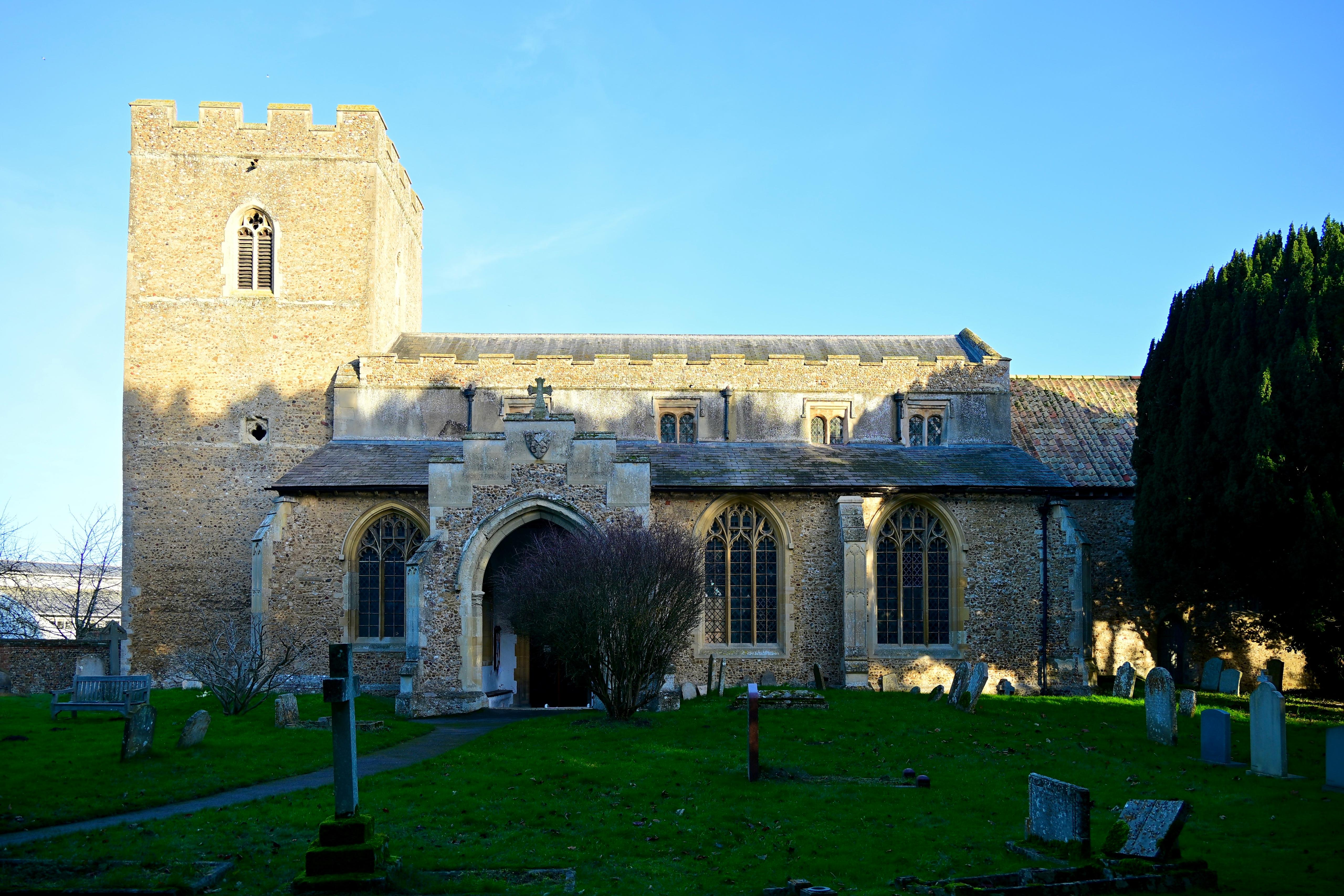
- Church of St Peter, Babraham
- 52.1324248°N 0.2041910°E
- Location: Babraham, Cambridgeshire
- Country: England
- Denomination: Church of England

History
- Status: Parish church
- Dedication: Saint Peter

Architecture
- Functional status: Active
- Heritage designation: Grade I listed
- Designated: 22 November 1967
- Style: Perpendicular Gothic

Specifications
- Materials: Flint rubble with limestone dressings

Administration
- Diocese: Ely
- Archdeaconry: Cambridge
- Deanery: Granta
- Parish: Babraham

St Peter’s Church, Babraham is a Grade I listed Church of England parish church located in the village of Babraham in Cambridgeshire, England. It is dedicated to St Peter.

== History ==
The church stands on the bank of the River Granta within the landscaped grounds of Babraham Hall, which is now part of the Babraham Research Campus. A church has occupied the site since at least the 12th century, when the dedication to St Peter was first recorded, seemingly attested to by the presence of a reused Norman carved capital built into the chancel wall.

The chancel and lower part of the west tower were constructed in the mid-13th century, and new windows and a south doorway were added in the 14th century. The nave, aisles, arcades, clerestory, and south porch, together with the upper stages of the tower, were rebuilt in the 15th century in the Perpendicular Gothic style. The north porch followed in the 16th century.

During the 17th century, the church underwent alteration and repair. New altar rails dated 1665 replaced an earlier set, probably destroyed during the iconoclastic visitation of William Dowsing in 1643. The tower was also strengthened at this time. In 1770–74, Robert Jones carried out a significant restoration: the nave was reroofed and many medieval fittings, including the chancel screen, were removed. Later restorations took place in the late 19th and early 20th centuries.

The building was designated Grade I listed on 22 November 1967.

== Architecture ==
The church is built of flint rubble with limestone dressings and consists of a four-bay nave with north and south aisles, a clerestory, a small chancel, north and south porches, and a square embattled west tower. The chancel and tower base are 13th-century, while the nave, aisles, and south porch date from the 15th century, and the clerestory and north porch from the 16th. The tower has diagonal buttresses and is finished with battlements.

The interior is characterised by lofty 15th-century arcades rising to a tie-beam roof with plastered panels. Most aisle and clerestory windows are clear-glazed, and against the whitewashed walls this maximises the effect of light.

The churchyard contains several memorials to the Adeane family, long associated with Babraham Hall.

== Interior fittings ==
- A 15th-century octagonal font with a contemporaneous wooden cover, also octagonal, shaped as a small Tudor dome with carved foliage rising along its ribs.
- An octagonal pulpit with a tulip-stem base and crude Perpendicular tracery. Originally part of a three-decker arrangement, its accompanying desks now stand opposite the chancel arch.
- A tablet recording the martyrdom of John Hullier, who was the vicar of Babraham from 1549 until his execution at Cambridge in 1556 for refusing to renounce his Protestant faith.
- Baroque monument to Sir Richard and Sir Thomas Benet (c.1667) on east wall of south aisle. Comprising a black marble chest with contrasting white marble life-size standing figures of both men in animated poses, its design is attributed to Jasper Latham.
- A large wooden reredos on the east wall of the chancel dating to around 1700, with columns, gilded capitals, cherubic heads, and inscribed panels detailing the Ten Commandments, Apostles’ Creed, and Lord’s Prayer.
- Wall monument to Judith Benet (c.1713) in south aisle, carved in white marble and decorated with weeping cherubs and a flaming urn.
- Perpendicular east window glazed in 1966 with stained glass designed by John Piper and manufactured by Patrick Reyntiens. The three main lights depict symbols of St Peter: a fishing boat on green, crossed keys on blue, and a cockerel on orange. Smaller lights show further attributes associated with the saint, an inverted cross, chains, a fish, and an anchor.

== Gallery ==
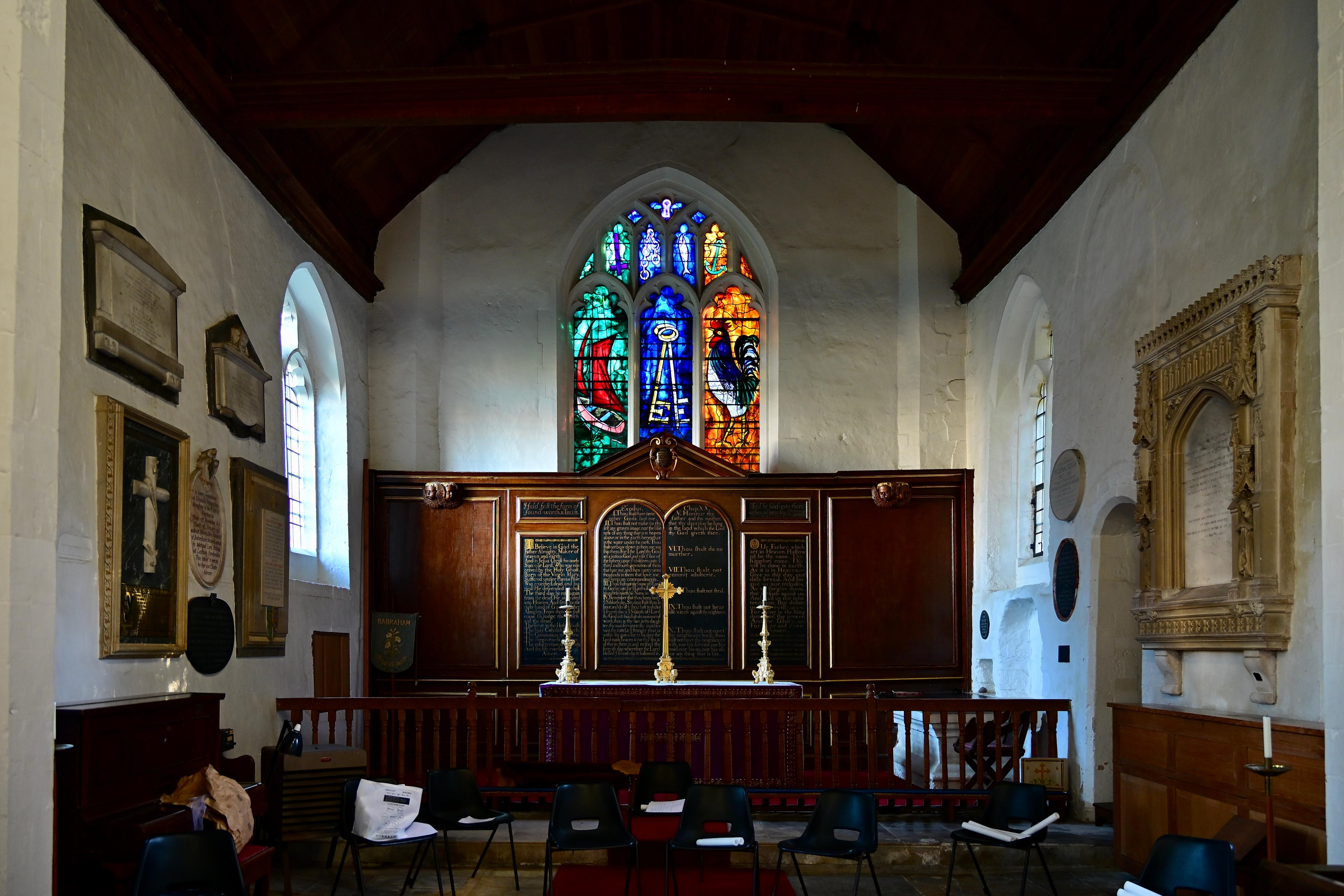
View of Chancel

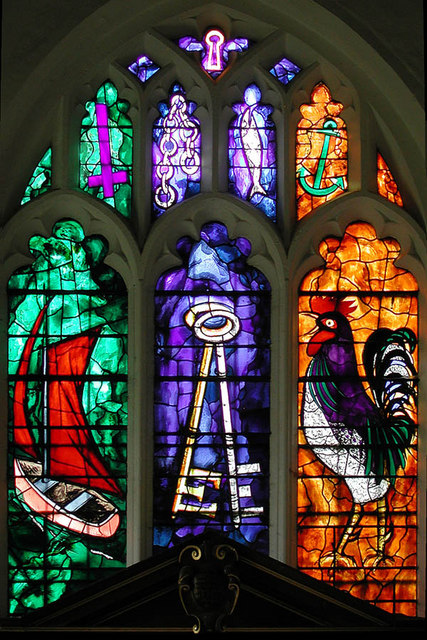
Tree of Life window by John Piper

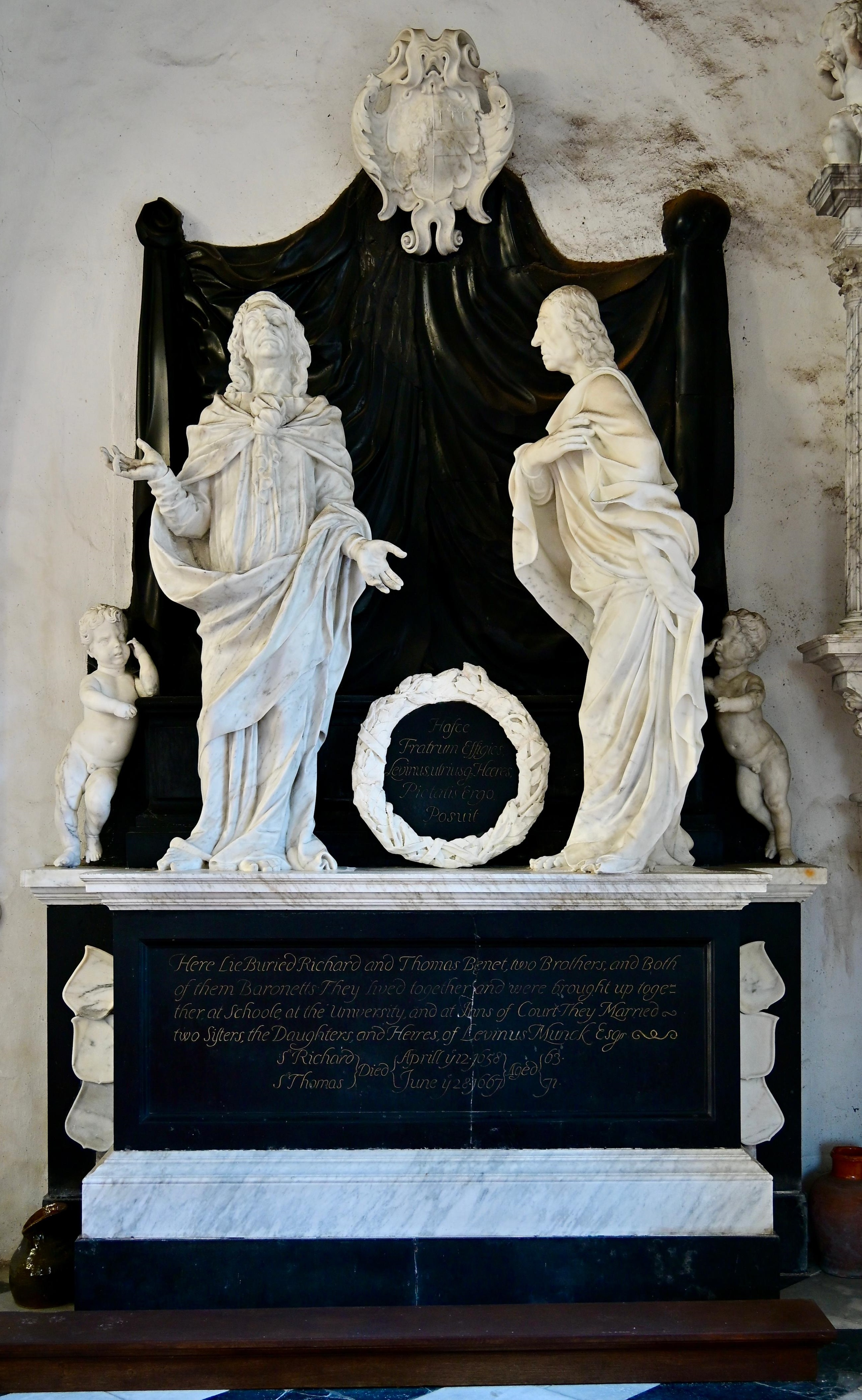
Monument to Sir Richard and Sir Thomas Benet
