= Bath Cabinet Makers =

Bath Cabinet Makers Ltd.
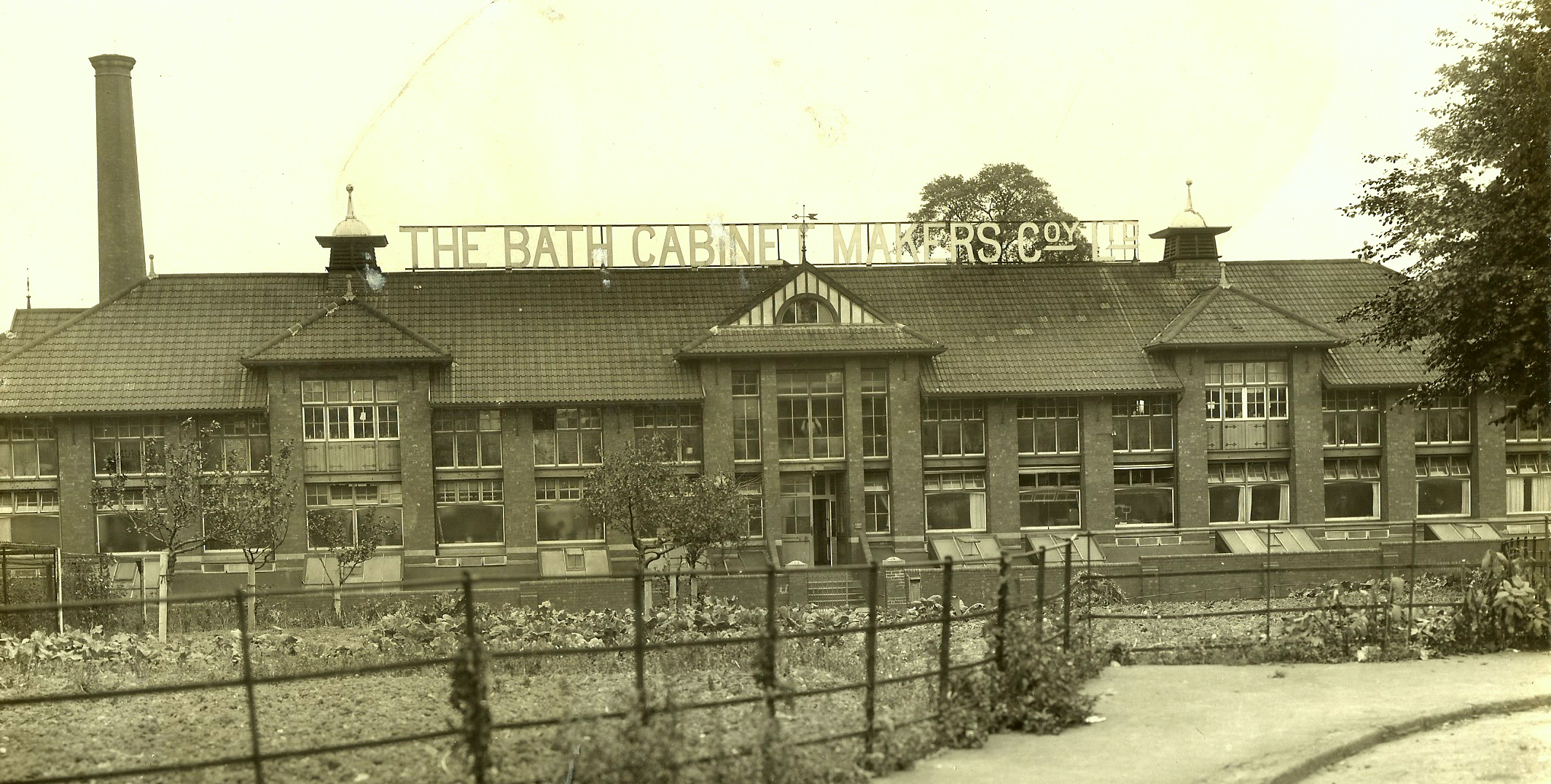
- Bath Cabinet Makers factory in Bellotts Road, Twerton. Built 1895.
- Native name: Bath and West Co-operative Cabinet Makers Ltd
- Type: Privately held company
- Traded as: Bath Cabinet Makers
- Industry: Furniture makers
- Founder: Charles A Richter
- Headquarters: Twerton, Bath, England

Bath Cabinet Makers Ltd. traded for sixty-seven years (1892–1959) in Bath, Somerset, England, with a history of furniture-making. Under management of Charles A Richter (1876–1945) until 1934, its work was regularly illustrated in The Studio and the company soon began to receive international prizes. A variety of styles was produced, from Parisian-inspired versions of 'Adam' to Art Nouveau, Art Deco, Arts and Crafts and streamlined Modern in a huge range of woods, solid and veneer. Important contracts included furniture and fittings for Cunard's luxury liners, the Queen Mary and Queen Elizabeth. A proportion of its output was mass-produced for cheaper markets although the workmanship was always of a high standard.

== History ==
Initially the company was named the Bath Cabinet Makers Guild. It was known as Bath Cabinet Makers when its first factory was built in 1895, on Bellots Road, Twerton, which was one of the largest and best equipped in the country. Bath Timber Supply Ltd and Bath Guild of Handicraft and Design were set up in the 1920s to support Bath Cabinet Makers. George Montague Elwood was responsible for many of the Art Nouveau pieces around 1899–1900, but most of Bath Cabinet Makers' furniture was designed by the Richter brothers, Charles Augustus (1867–1946), Herbert Davis (1874–1955) and their team. Charles Richter became president of the National Federation of Furniture Trades and was appointed to Lord Gorell's Commission on improving the standard of art in industry. In JC Rogers' Modern English Furniture (1930) he is one of forty-two designers listed beside the better-known Barnsleys and Edwin Lutyens.

Bath Cabinet Makers owed its existence to a strike at F and A Norris Brothers' Bath's Albion Cabinet Works in December 1891. The following year, Charles Richter, an employee at Albion, launched the Bath and West Co-operative Cabinet Makers Ltd. The intention was determinedly idealistic; men needed jobs and the city provided enterprise. Shareholders were represented by a committee five members, one of whom was the influential Cedric Chivers from the bookbinding family. Richter was elected general manager the following month, and work began in rented accommodation.

In 1892 the name was contracted to The Bath Cabinet Makers Ltd. The next year, Charles Richter walked out, objecting to the Shareholders' reluctance to expand. Two years later the Society called him back as managing director, with Herbert Davis Richter Head of the Design Department. Herbert Davis Richter's drawings were reproduced in all the relevant leading architectural journals. In 1895 the brothers collaborated with Messrs Silcock and Reay on the design of a distinctive new building. In 1900, the firm won five medals at the Paris World Exhibition.

== Idealism of Charles A Richter ==
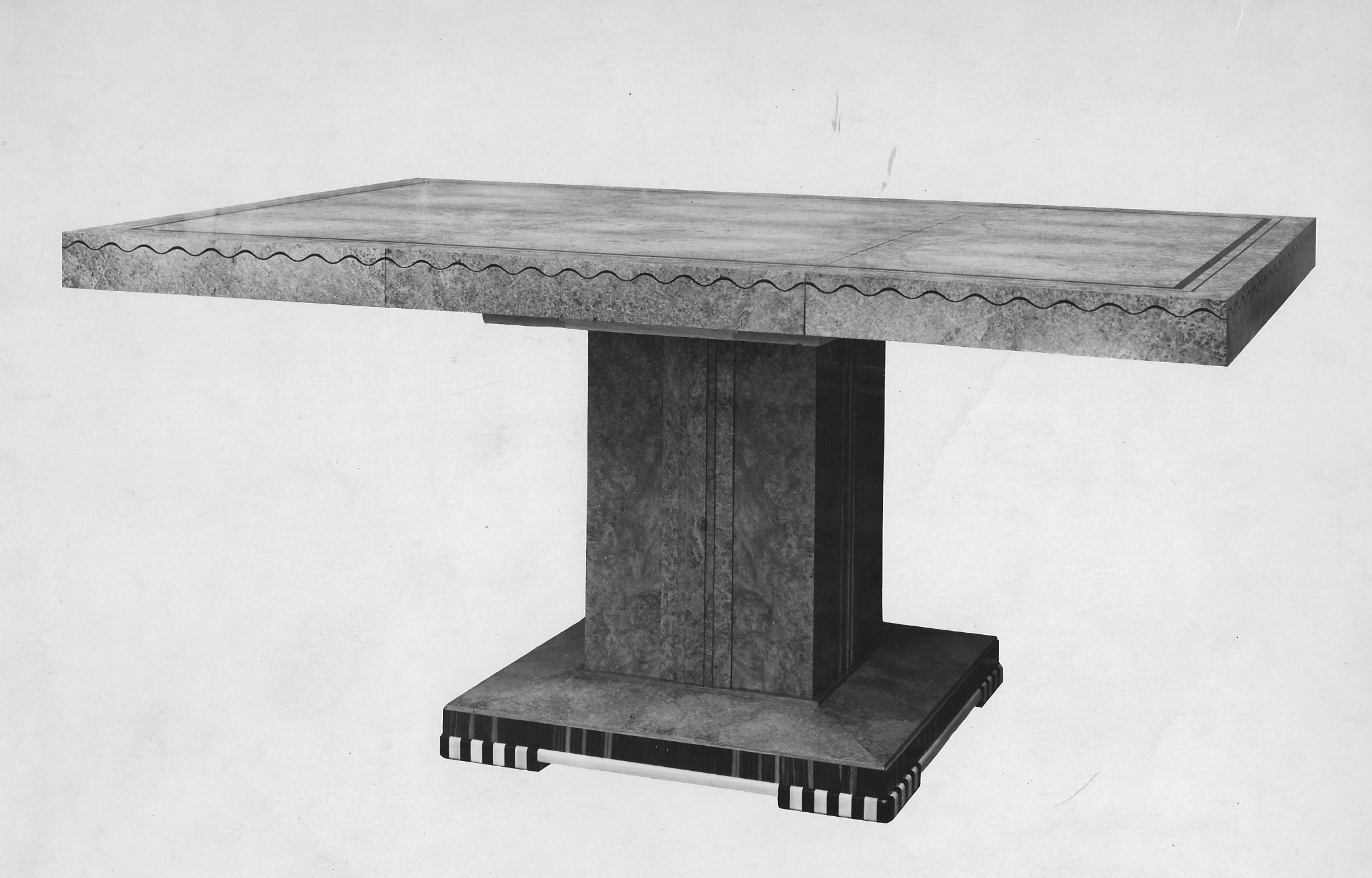
Table in walnut with black insets, designed by CA Richter

William Morris considered that machines were responsible for bad design. As handwork was necessarily time-consuming, his furniture was too expensive for the very people he wanted to supply. In contrast, Charles Richter, a committed socialist and natural progressive, deplored asking men to perform arduous tasks that could easily be accomplished by machine. In Bath Cabinet Makers's early days, he set up an Education Committee and ran games and dramatic clubs. Acquainted with GB Shaw, he asked the playwright down to Bath for a performance of Caesar and Cleopatra.

== Later years ==
Prior to World War I, Bath Cabinet Makers furniture was on constant display in London stores such as Maples and Harrods. While Herbert Davis Richter left Bath Cabinet Makers in 1906 to become a painter, Charles Richter's hope of early retirement were interrupted by the war. The factories were converted to manufacture aircraft parts, to be restored to panelling, joinery and high-class furniture when the war ended. The family interest was extended when Herbert Davis Richter's wife, Gertrude, and Charles Richter's sister, Florence Schottler, launched The Guild of Handicraft and Design to make soft furnishings for large contracts coming in from America, India and Germany. Further recognition was earned at the British Empire Exhibition at Wembley of 1924 and the Paris Exhibition of 1925. CAR's elder son Ian joined the firm in the early 1920s and became managing director in 1934. He produced some fine wood carvings that were used in the setting of BCM furniture, many on the Queen Elizabeth. The 1930s depression affected demand for luxury furniture but Charles Richter managed to keep his firm afloat.

In the early 1920s another factory was purchased on the Lower Bristol Road, by Fielding's Road, with a large the floorspace of 220,000 square feet (20,000 m^{2}), known as the Bath Artcrafts Company. This building also provided space for the Bath Timber Supply Ltd, stocking a large range of wood.

== Post 1945 ==
Its name and the goodwill lasted for more than a century; in 1959 the firm was taken over by Yatton Furniture. Plagiarism had been a continual battle. From the outset Bath Cabinet Makers's prolific output and range of styles led to pirating by other companies. This has led to much of their work being attributed to other firms. Current research into Wylie & Lochhead and Bath Cabinet Makers reveals that prestigious museums throughout the country have believed that Bath Cabinet Makers furniture was made by the Scottish cabinet-making firm.

A new factory was built adjacent to the Lower Bristol Road factory between August 1966 and July 1967, on the other side of Fielding's Road. The factory was to a novel single floor design by Yorke Rosenberg Mardall architects, using a Metro space frame roof structure for the first time in the United Kingdom. In 1968 the building received the Financial Times Industrial Architecture Award and in 1969 a Civic Trust Awards commendation. In the 1970s this factory became a Herman Miller furniture factory. It was grade II listed in 2007, and renovated to become a series of retail units including a Lidl supermarket.

The company became part of the Christie-Tyler furniture group and in 1986 was bought out by Ken Fullalove, one of their directors.

== See also ==
- Museum of Bath at Work
- Bath, Somerset
- Derek Richter, son of CA Richter

== Bibliography ==
- Granville Fell, H (1935). The Art of H Davis Richter. Benfleet, Essex: F. Lewis Ltd. pp. 13–14.
- Festing, Sally (1998). "Charles Richter and Bath Cabinet Makers: The Early Years" (PDF). Bath History. VII: 146–166.
- Payne, Rodney (1981). "Bath Cabinet Makers". The Journal of the Decorative Arts Society. 5 (5): 23–30. JSTOR 41804183.
