= Michael Wakelam =

British scientist (1955–2020)

- Born: 15 July 1955
- Died: 31 March 2020 (aged 64)
- Education: University of Birmingham
- Scientific career
- Fields: biochemistry, lipidomics, signal transduction
- Institutions: University of Konstanz, Imperial College London, University of Glasgow, University of Birmingham, Babraham Institute

Michael John Owen Wakelam (15 July 1955 – 31 March 2020) was a British molecular biologist and director of the Babraham Institute in Cambridge, England.

== Biography ==
Wakelam received a BSc in medical biochemistry (1977) and a PhD in biochemistry (1980) from the University of Birmingham. After post-doctoral training at the University of Konstanz (DE), he joined the Department of Biochemistry of Imperial College London in 1983. In 1985, he joined the Biochemistry department of the University of Glasgow as a Lecturer (1985), Senior Lecturer (1991) and Reader (1992). He became a Professor of molecular pharmacology at the University of Birmingham in 1993. In 2007, he became director of the Babraham Institute in Cambridge.

Wakelam died on 31 March 2020, of a suspected COVID-19 infection during the COVID-19 pandemic in England.
