= Howard Rasmussen =

American physician (1925-2005)

- Born: March 1, 1925 (age 101); Harrisburg, Pennsylvania
- Died: April 20, 2005 (aged 80)

Howard Rasmussen (1925–2005) was an American physician-scientist known for his research on aldosterone and insulin secretion.

== Early life and education ==
Howard Rasmussen was born March 1, 1925, in Harrisburg, Pennsylvania, to Frederick Rasmussen and Faith Elliott. He grew up on a Pennsylvania dairy farm with five brothers. As a young man, he served in the United States military in World War II in Europe, earning a Purple Heart with an oak leaf cluster. At the war's conclusion, Rasmussen attended Gettysburg College, earning a Bachelor of Science in 1948. He then went on to medical school at Harvard University, earning his medical degree in 1952, followed by training in internal medicine at Massachusetts General Hospital. Rasmussen then spent 1955–1956 as a research fellow at University College London, before returning to the US to pursue a PhD – which he was awarded by Rockefeller University in 1959.

== Academic career ==
Following his PhD, Rasmussen stayed for a short time at Rockefeller as an assistant professor, before being hired away by the University of Wisconsin, Madison as an associate professor in 1961. He later moved again to join the faculty of the University of Pennsylvania as the Benjamin Rush Professor and Chair of Biochemistry. In 1976, Rasmussen moved to Yale University where he served as Professor of Medicine and Cell Biology as well as Chief of the Endocrinology and Metabolism section at Yale Medical School. In 1993, Rasmussen moved to the Medical College of Georgia to found and direct the Institute of Molecular Medicine and Genetics. He retired in 2000.

Rasmussen was named a fellow of the American Association for the Advancement of Science in 1985.

== Research ==
Rasmussen's research focused on hormone signaling, particularly parathyroid hormone, aldosterone, and insulin. He was among the first to appreciate the role of calcium as a cellular second messenger.

== Personal life ==
Rasmussen married Jane Spence in 1952, and they remained married until her death in 1999. They had four children. He died on April 20, 2005, in Charlotte, North Carolina following a prolonged illness.
