= Leonard R. Stephens =

Len Stephens
- Education: University of Birmingham
- Scientific career
- Fields: immunology, signal transduction
- Workplaces: Babraham Institute

Leonard (Len) R Stephens FRS (born 18 June 1960) is a molecular biologist, senior group leader and associate director at the Babraham Institute.

Len Stephens has contributed much to the understanding of inositol lipids functions in eukaryotic cells, and in particular in neutrophils. Early highlights were the mapping of new pathways of inositol phosphate synthesis. Together with his long-time collaborator Phillip Thomas Hawkins, he established that PtdIns(4,5)P2 is the main substrate of receptor-controlled Type 1 phosphoinositide 3-kinases (PI3Ks), thus identifying PtdIns(3,4,5)P3 as the key output signal produced by this enzyme. They identified and isolated the GPCR-activated Type 1B PI3K (PI3KΥ) and, in a sustained body of work, defined its structure, explained its complex pattern of regulation by GβΥ and Ras, and proved its role in inflammatory events in vivo. They – in parallel with Dario Alessi – identified phosphoinositide-dependent kinase-1 as the PtdIns(3,4,5)P3-activated link between PI3K-1 activation and protein kinase B activation, a key pathway through which PtdIns(3,4,5)P3 formation regulates cell proliferation and survival. Later, they showed that PtdIns(3,4,5)P3 was responsible for the recruitment of both PKB and PDK1 to the membrane, and therefore the activation of the former by the latter.

== Life ==
Len Stephens received a BSc in Biology (1981) and a PhD in Physiology (1984) from the University of Birmingham. After a post-doctoral training in S.K. & F. Research Ltd, he joined the AFRC IAPGR (now Babraham Institute). He became a staff scientist in the Inositide laboratory in 1992 and took the leadership of the laboratory in 1996. In 2008, he became associate director of the Babraham Institute.

== Awards and recognition ==
Len Stephens has received several awards, including:

- 2011, elected Fellow of the Royal Society of London
- 2009, elected member of the European Molecular Biology Organisation (EMBO)
