= Babraham =

Village in Cambridgeshire, England

Coordinates: 52.12°N 00.20°E

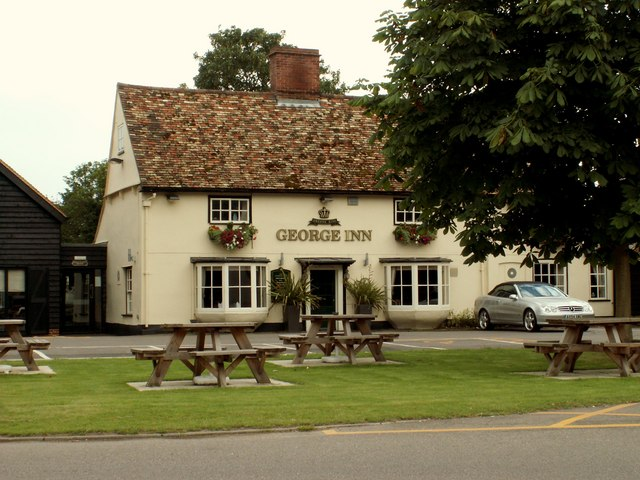
- The George Inn, Babraham

- Location within Cambridgeshire
- Population: 276 (2011 Census)
- OS grid reference: TL5150
- Civil parish: Babraham
- District: South Cambridgeshire
- Shire county: Cambridgeshire
- Region: East
- Country: England
- Sovereign state: United Kingdom
- Post town: CAMBRIDGE
- Postcode district: CB22
- Dialling code: 01223
- Police: Cambridgeshire
- Fire: Cambridgeshire
- Ambulance: East of England

Babraham is a village and civil parish in the South Cambridgeshire district of Cambridgeshire, England, about 6 miles (9.7 km) south-east of Cambridge on the A1307 road.

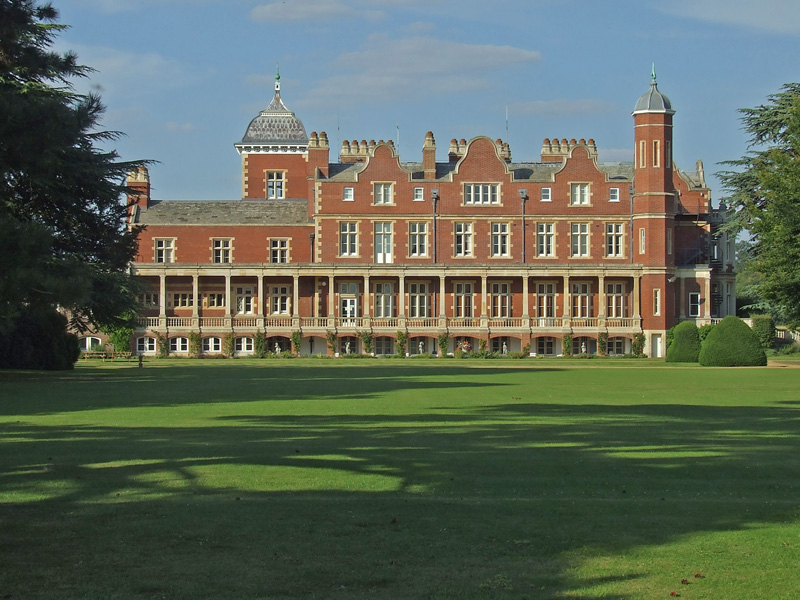
Babraham Hall, now part of the Babraham Institute

Babraham is home to the Babraham Institute which undertakes research into cell and molecular biology.

== History ==
The parish of Babraham covers an area of 2,387 acres (966 ha) and is roughly rectangular in shape. Its straight northern boundary is formed by the ancient Wool Street, separating it from Fulbourn, and its eastern border follows the Icknield Way (now the A11), separating it from Little Abington. The remaining boundaries with Stapleford, Sawston and Pampisford are formed by field boundaries and a small section of the River Granta, on which the village lies.

The course of the River Granta through the parish has been changed on numerous occasions; a watermill was listed as valueless in the 14th century when the river had changed course, and additional water channels have been dug for irrigation as well as to form an ornamental canal alongside Babraham Hall. Severe floods hit Babraham in both 1655 and 1749.

Traces of a Roman villa have been found on its parish boundary with Stapleford. It has also been suggested that the village has moved site, the principal evidence being that the church is 400 metres (440 yd) from the present village. Babraham was comparatively wealthy during medieval times due to its wool trade, with the highest tax returns in its hundred. In the late 16th century the manor was the principal seat of the great Elizabethan merchant and financier Sir Horatio Palavicino. Between 1632 and the 19th century, the manor was owned by the Bennet, and later the Adeane, families, who lived in Babraham Hall. The Hall was built in 1833 by Henry John Adeane.

Listed as Badburgham in the Domesday Book of 1086, the village's name means "homestead or village of a woman called Beaduburh". This version of the name was also used in the 15th century, as the home village of an ostler called Roger Baldok, in a Plea Roll of the Court of Common Pleas.

John Hullier was vicar of the parish of Babraham from 1549 until he was deprived in February 1556. On 16 April 1556 he was burned at the stake on Jesus Green, Cambridge for refusing to renounce the Protestant faith. The antiquary William Cole lived in Babraham as a child when his father was the steward of the owners of Babraham Hall. In the 19th century Babraham was home to Jonas Webb, a noted stock breeder who played a pivotal role in developing the Southdown breed of sheep.

== Church ==
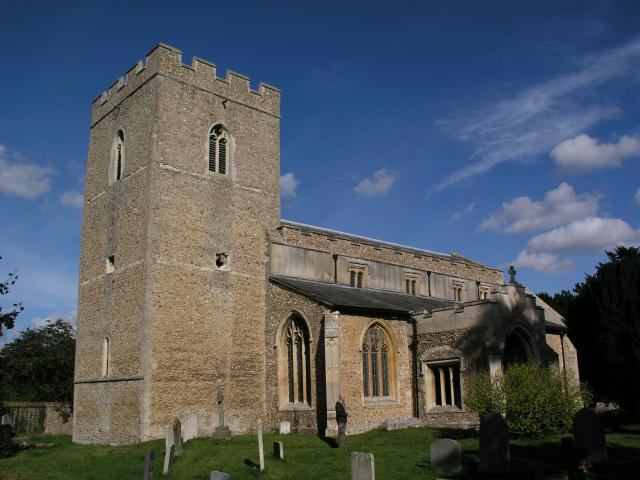
St Peter's Church

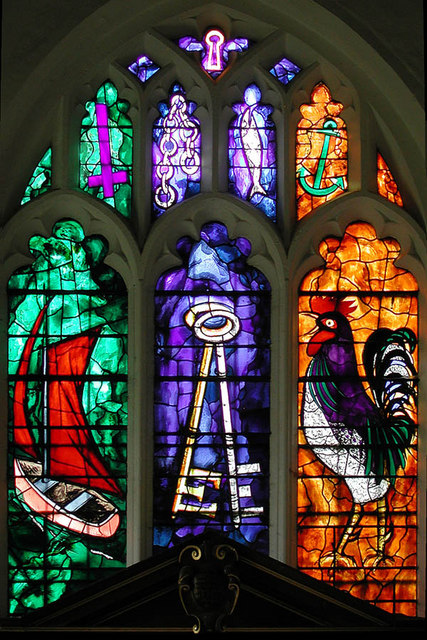
Church East window by John Piper

Babraham is served by the Grade I listed Church of England parish church of St Peter. There was probably a church in the village at the time of the Norman Conquest, though the first official record was in the late 12th century. The present church, dedicated to St Peter since the 12th century, consists of a chancel, an aisled and clerestoried nave with north and south porches, and a west tower. There are two bells in the tower, both from 1614. The smaller weighs 11cwt and is cracked; the larger 13cwt. The window in the east chancel is by John Piper.

The chancel and lower part of the tower date from the 13th century though there is evidence of an earlier building. The nave was completely rebuilt in the 15th century.

== Village life ==
The village contains a primary school called Babraham Primary School, which opened in 1959. It also retains one public house, The George, which was already open as an inn in 1488 but rebuilt in around 1600. There have been inns listed in the village from the 13th century, presumably on the Icknield Way at Bourn Bridge. Other former inns include The Angel, listed in 1490, The Swan, open in the 16th century, and The Chequer and The Griffin, all four of which were still open in 1600. Three ale-house licences were awarded to the village in 1682.

Babraham village cricket team won the Cambridgeshire Cricket Association Senior League in 2008.

== Babraham in literature ==
F. L. Lucas's novel Doctor Dido (Cassell, London, 1938) is set in Babraham and its environs in the period 1792–1812. With much local and antiquarian detail, it tells the story of Samuel Plampin, Doctor of Divinity at Cambridge and vicar of St Peter's Babraham, who brings to the vicarage as his housekeeper a young Frenchwoman he finds in Cambridge, a destitute refugee from the Terror.

Rupert Brooke's poem The Old Vicarage, Grantchester, includes the line "Strong men have cried like babes, bydam, To hear what happened at Babraham."

Evelyn Barnard's children's book The Brothers Are Walking is set in Babraham.
