= Medical College of Georgia Institute of Molecular Medicine and Genetics =

The Medical College of Georgia Institute of Molecular Medicine and Genetics (IMMAG) is a biomedical research facility located in Augusta, Georgia.

== Mission ==
The mission of IMMAG is to promote excellence in basic and translational biomedical research and promote a philosophy of open doors interdisciplinary collaboration.

== History ==
The Institute of Molecular Medicine and Genetics was founded in 1993, as part of MCG's 10 year master plan.

== Facilities ==
Facilities to support research activities have been an important feature of IMMAG from the outset. Key funding to purchase equipment located in research core facilities was obtained through the GRA, whose primary mission is to help universities in Georgia build and modernize research infrastructure through capital investments in new equipment. Several IMMAG faculty hold appointments as core faculty directors to ensure that MCG investigators have access to state-of-the-art technologies essential for biomedical research in the modern world. Core facilities administered through IMMAG include:

- Cell imaging: fluorescence, confocal, and multiphoton microscopy
- Transgenic Mouse & Embryonic Stem Cell
- Transgenic Zebrafish
- Flow Cytometry
- Laser Capture Microdissection
- Electron Microscopy & Histology
- Proteomics & Mass Spectrometry

== Funding ==
Funding for IMMAG comes from sources such as the National Institute of Health, the United States Department of Energy, the United States Department of Defense, the Department of Veteran Affairs, and the National Aeronautics & Space Administration.
