= Derek Richter =

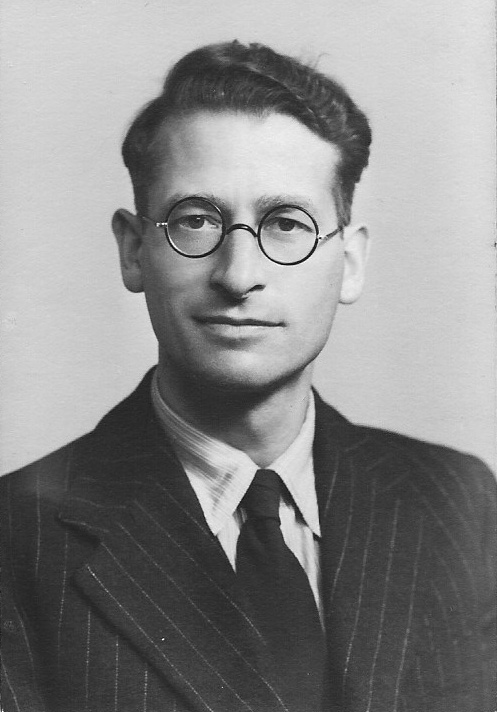
- Born: 14 January 1907; Bath, Somerset, England
- Died: 15 December 1995 (aged 88)
- Occupations: Psychiatrist, chemist, neuropsychiatrist

Derek Richter (14 January 1907 – 15 December 1995), English neuroscientist, was one of the founding fathers of the science of brain chemistry. Identifying monoamine oxidase and demonstrating its function in the brain early in his career, he became a prime mover in his field. In 1968 he was involved in the foundation of the British Brain Research Organization (BRA). Before this he helped to establish the Mental Health Research Fund, later renamed The Mental Health Foundation,(1949). He also established the Journal of Neurochemistry (1956), of which he was one of the chief editors from 1956 to 1969. He was involved in the foundation of the International Brain Research Organization (IBRO) (1960), of which he became secretary-general, and the International Society for Neurochemistry (ISN) (1967). After leading a research unit at Whitchurch Psychiatric Hospital (1947–1960), he became director of the Medical Research Council Neuropsychiatric Research Unit in Carshalton (1960–1971). Throughout his life he promoted international collaboration in research.

== Biography ==
Richter was born in Bath, Somerset, the third child of Charles A Richter, co-founder of the family firm, Bath Cabinet Makers. From Oundle School he won a scholarship to Magdalen College, Oxford, where he gained a first-class honour's degree in chemistry. At the Ludwig-Maximilians-Universität München, he worked under Nobel Prize-winning Heinrich Wieland. In 1931, he gained a PhD (magna cum laude) for the autoxidation of aldehydes.

He then moved to Sir Frederick Gowland Hopkins Biochemical Laboratory at Cambridge alongside Nobel laureates Ernst Chain, Richard Synge, Frederick Sanger, Hans Krebs and Archer Martin. This was a defining period, working with Hermann Blaschko on monoamines that have a great physiological interest.

A year before the outbreak of World War II, he took a post at the Maudsley Hospital to work on amphetamines. Married to Beryl Ailsa Griffiths, with whom he had three children, he set up a wartime research laboratory for treating shell-shock in the Mill Hill Emergency Hospital. Despite taxing commitments, he simultaneously qualified in medicine at St Bartholomew's Hospital.

In 1947, Richter received a Rockefeller Foundation grant to set up a laboratory in the Whitchurch Psychiatric Hospital, Cardiff. Four years later, with one of the first Geiger counters to measure radioisotopes in the country, he and RMC Dawson had isolated nuclei from the cells of the cerebral cortex and demonstrated changes in brain metabolism with changes in brain function. With Linford Rees, he carried out early work on biochemical changes concerning epilepsy and electroconvulsive therapy (ECT) and collaborated with W. Grey-Walter in EEG studies. With Miki Gaitonde, he worked on the metabolic activity of proteins of the brain.

At Carshalton, Richter gathered a multidisciplinary international group of scientists with a global approach to their research. He became involved with the World Health Organization, and Amnesty International. In retirement, he was elected a fellow of the Royal College of Psychiatrists, and wrote a series of humanitarian books. Typically, his last book was intended for foreign visitors.

Concern for the childless women prompted him, through medical colleague Bertold Wiesner to become one of the first sperm donors at Mary Barton (Wiesner's wife)'s insemination clinic in London. Some of these children have been identified by DNA markers. Between April 1945 and 1951 he made weekly contributions at a time when AID was strictly anonymous and very controversial. It was a precursor to modern developments in reproductive technology such as IVF, that are leading to changes in the structure of families.

He continued to write and edit enlightened books, gardened passionately and joined his second wife, Molly Bullock, in establishing South Lodge, a refuge in Epsom for discharged mental patients.

== Notable works ==
- Green DE, Richter D (1937) "Adrenaline and adrenochrome". Biochem J 31:596–616
- Richter D (1937) "Adrenaline and amine oxidase". Biochem J 31-2022-2028
- Richter D, Crossland J (1949) "Variation in the acetylcholine content of the brain with physiological state". Am. J Physiol 150:247–255
- Dawson RMC, Richter D (1950) "Effect of stimulation on the phosphate esters of the brain". Am. J Physiol 160:203–211
- Richter D, Hullin RP (1951) "Isolated nuclei from cells of the cerebral cortex". Biochem J 48: 406–410
- Gaitonde MK, Richter D (1956) "The metabolic activity of proteins of the brain". Proc R Soc B 145:83–99
- Richter D ed. (1950) Perspectives in Neuropsychiatry, HK Lewis & Co., London.
- Richter D, Reiss M, Elkes J, Hapoold FC, Weil-Malherbe H, Harris GW (1953) "Ignorances in biochemistry, endocrinology and pharmacology", in Tanner JM ed. Prospects in Psychiatric Research. Blackwell Scientific Publishers, Oxford pp. 109–155
- Gaitonde MK, Richter D (1956) "The metabolic activity of proteins of the brain", Proc Roy Soc B, 145:83–99
- Richter D ed. (1957) Schizophrenia: Somatic Aspects. Pergamon Press, London Balazs R, Richter D (1960).
- Balázs R; Richter D. (1960) "Observations on the mechanism of the aerobic control of Glycolysis in Brain Mitochondrial Fraction". Biochem J 74:30pp
- Richter D ed. Aspects of Learning and Memory (1966), Wm Heinemann Medical Books
- Balázs, R; Machiyama, Y; Hammond, GJ; Julian, T; Richter, D. (1970) "The operation of gamma-aminobutyrate bypath of the tricarboxylic acid cycle in brain tissue in vitro". Biochem J 116(3):445-61
- Richter D ed. The Challenge of Violence (1972), Ardua Press, Tadworth, Surrey.
- Richter D ed. Women Scientists: The Road to Liberation (1982), Macmillan, ISBN 0-333-32468-4
- Richter D ed. Research in Mental Illness (1984), WM Heinemann Medical Books, ISBN 0-433-27601-0
- Richter D, Life in Research (1989), Stuart Phillips Publications., Kingswood, Surrey, ISBN 1-869808-01-0
- Richter D, English Usage Guide (1992), The Book Guild Lewes, ISBN 0-86332-738-9
