= Ivan De Burgh Daly =

British experimental physiologist and animal physiologist (1893–1974)

Ivan de Burgh Daly CBE FRS FRSE
- Born: 14 April 1893; Leamington Spa, Warwickshire
- Died: 8 February 1974 (aged 80); Aylesbury, Buckinghamshire
- Spouse: Beatrice Mary Leetham (m. 1920)
- Children: Michael de Burgh Daly; Peter Daly
- Parents: James Thomas Daly RN; Amy Pritchard

Academic background
- Education: Beech Lane Preparatory School, Leamington Spa; Rossall School; University of Cambridge (MA MB ChB)

Academic work
- Institutions: University College, London; University of Cardiff; Mason College, Birmingham; University of Edinburgh; University of Cambridge
- Military career
- Allegiance: United Kingdom
- Branch: Royal Air Force
- Service years: 1914–1918
- Rank: Flight Lt; Captain
- Units: Royal Naval Air Service; RAF Medical Branch

Ivan de Burgh Daly CBE FRS FRSE (14 April 1893 – 8 February 1974) was a British experimental physiologist and animal physiologist who had a specialist knowledge of ECG use and was awarded a Beit Fellowship in this field in 1920. Together with Shellshear, he was the first in England to use thermionic valves in any biological context. In 1948, he was instrumental in the foundation of the Babraham Institute at the University of Cambridge. He was a leading authority on pulmonary and bronchial systems.

== Life ==
He was born on 14 April 1893 at Pyrmont, Brinswood Avenue in Leamington Spa, Warwickshire the son of Amy (née Pritchard), daughter of Reverend Charles Pritchard of Withington, and James Thomas Daly RN (1853–1928). The family claimed descent from the Irish noble family of Clanricarde and therefore assumed the additional name of de Burgh. He was educated at Beech Lane Preparatory School in Leamington and then Rossall School (1906–1911). He attended the University of Cambridge studying medicine, graduating with an MA in 1914 and an MB and ChB in 1918.

His studies were interrupted by the First World War. He served in the Royal Naval Air Service firstly as a Flight Lieutenant (pilot) flying 392 flights and being wounded in France. He thereafter served as a captain in the RAF Medical Branch. From November 1918 until August 1919 he served on the demobilisation board, assessing injuries in relation to potential war pensions. On return to civilian life he took up a post as Assistant Lecturer in Physiology at University College, London. In 1923 he moved to the University of Cardiff as a Senior Lecturer in Experimental Physiology. In 1927 he took up a professorship in Physiology at Mason College in Birmingham. In 1933 he continued in the same role for the University of Edinburgh (a far more prestigious location in his field), replacing Sir Edward Albert Sharpey-Schafer. This period was far longer but this time was interrupted by the Second World War during which he was seconded to direct medical research at the Armoured Fighting Vehicles Training School, forming part of the Gunnery School at Lulworth Camp in southern England. He returned to the University of Edinburgh briefly after the war then in 1947 became Director of the Institute of Animal Physiology at the University of Cambridge, holding the role until his retirement in 1958. During this period he was instrumental in the creation of the Babraham Institute.

He was elected a Fellow of the Royal Society of Edinburgh (FRSE) in 1934 during his period in Edinburgh. His proposers were Sir Edward Albert Sharpey-Schafer, James Hartley Ashworth, Alfred Joseph Clark and James Couper Brash. He was elected a Fellow of the Royal Society of London (FRS) in 1943. In 1955 he served as president of the British Thoracic Society. He was awarded a Commander of the Order of the British Empire (CBE) in 1959.

He died at home, Long Crendon in Aylesbury on 8 February 1974.

== Family ==
He married Beatrice Mary (Molly) Leetham in 1920.

Their eldest son is Professor Michael de Burgh Daly of the University of London. Their younger son Peter Daly was a Flight Lieutenant in the Royal Air Force and was killed in a helicopter accident in 1959.

== Other Positions of Note ==
- Agricultural Research Council 1943–1947
- Honorary Fellow of the Medical Society of Budapest
- Member of the Biochemical Society
- Lyon Lecturer in Minneapolis in 1951
- Bertram Louis Abrahams Lecturer 1956
- Bayliss-Starling Memorial Lecturer 1967
