= List of benzodiazepines =

The tables below contain a sample list of benzodiazepines and benzodiazepine analogs that are commonly prescribed, with their basic pharmacological characteristics, such as half-life and equivalent doses to other benzodiazepines, also listed, along with their trade names and primary uses. The elimination half-life is how long it takes for half of the drug to be eliminated by the body. "Time to peak" refers to when maximum levels of the drug in the blood occur after a given dose. Benzodiazepines generally share the same pharmacological properties, such as anxiolytic, sedative, hypnotic, skeletal muscle relaxant, amnesic, and anticonvulsant effects. Variation in potency of certain effects may exist amongst individual benzodiazepines. Some benzodiazepines produce active metabolites. Active metabolites are produced when a person's body metabolizes the drug into compounds that share a similar pharmacological profile to the parent compound and thus are relevant when calculating how long the pharmacological effects of a drug will last. Long-acting benzodiazepines with long-acting active metabolites, such as diazepam and chlordiazepoxide, are often prescribed for benzodiazepine or alcohol withdrawal as well as for anxiety if constant dose levels are required throughout the day. Shorter-acting benzodiazepines are often preferred for insomnia due to their lesser hangover effect.

It is fairly important to note that elimination half-life of diazepam and chlordiazepoxide, as well as other long half-life benzodiazepines, is twice as long in the elderly compared to younger individuals. Due to increased sensitivity and potentially dangerous adverse events among elderly patients, it is recommended to avoid prescribing them as specified by the 2015 American Geriatrics Society Beers Criteria. Individuals with an impaired liver also metabolize benzodiazepines more slowly. Thus, the approximate equivalent of doses below may need to be adjusted accordingly in individuals on short acting benzodiazepines who metabolize long-acting benzodiazepines more slowly and vice versa. The changes are most notable with long acting benzodiazepines as these are prone to significant accumulation in such individuals and can lead to withdrawal symptoms. For example, the equivalent dose of diazepam in an elderly individual on lorazepam may be half of what would be expected in a younger individual. Equivalent doses of benzodiazepines differ as much as 20 fold.

== Pharmacokinetic properties of various benzodiazepines ==
Equivalency data in the table below is taken from the Ashton "Benzodiazepine Equivalence Table".

Drug Name	Common Trade Names (Note: Not all trade names are listed.)	Year Approved (US FDA)	Typical Oral Dosage Formulations (mg)	Approx. Equivalent Oral Dose to 10 mg Diazepam (Note: An alternative table published by the state of South Australia uses equivalent approximate oral dosages to 5 mg diazepam.) (mg)	Peak Onset of Action (hours)	Elimination Half-life of Active Metabolite (hours)	Primary Therapeutic Use
Adinazolam	Deracyn	Research chemical			1–2	3	anxiolytic, antidepressant
Alprazolam	Alprox, Farmapram, Frontin, Helex, Kalma, Ksalol, Misar, Neurol, Onax, Restyl, Solanax, Tafil, Trankimazin, Xanax, Xanor	1981	0.25, 0.5, 1, 2	0.5	1–3	11-13 [10–20]	anxiolytic, antidepressant
Bentazepam (Note: Technically this is a thienodiazepine, but produces very similar effects as benzodiazepines.)	Thiadipona		25		1–3	2–4	anxiolytic
Bretazenil						2.5	anxiolytic, anticonvulsant
Bromazepam	Bromam, Lectopam, Lexatin, Lexaurin, Lexilium, Lexotan, Lexotanil	1981	1.5, 3, 6	6	1–5	20–40	anxiolytic, hypnotic, muscle relaxant
Bromazolam		Research chemical	2 , 4	2			anxiolytic
Brotizolam (Note: Technically this is a thienotriazolodiazepine, but produces very similar effects as benzodiazepines.)	Dormex, Lendormin, Noctilan, Sintonal,		0.25	0.5	0.5–2	4–5	hypnotic
Camazepam	Albego, Limpidon			40	1–3	6–11	anxiolytic
Chlordiazepoxide	Elenium, Librium, Risolid	1960	5, 10, 25	25	1.5–6	36–200	anxiolytic
Cinazepam	Levana		0.5, 1, 2		2–4	60	hypnotic, anxiolytic
Cinolazepam	Gerodorm		40		0.5–2	9	hypnotic
Clobazam	Frisium, Onfi, Urbanol	2011	5, 10, 20	20	1–5	8–60	anxiolytic, anticonvulsant
Clonazepam	Iktorivil, Klonopin, Paxam, Rivatril, Rivotril	1975	0.5, 1, 2	0.5-1	1–5	19.5–50	anticonvulsant, anxiolytic
Clonazolam		Research chemical	0.25, 0.5	0.2	0.5-1	3-4	hypnotic, anticonvulsant
Clorazepate	Tranxene, Tranxilium	1972	3.75, 5, 7.5	15	Variable	32–152	anxiolytic, anticonvulsant
Clotiazepam	Clozan, Rize, Veratran		5, 10	10	1–3	4	anxiolytic
Cloxazolam	Cloxam, Olcadil, Sepazon		1, 2, 4	1.5	2–5	55–77	anxiolytic, anticonvulsant
Delorazepam	Dadumir		0.5, 1, 2	1-1.5	1–2	79	anxiolytic, amnesic
Deschloroetizolam		Research chemical	1, 2	4			anxiolytic
Diazepam	Antenex, Apaurin, Apozepam, Apzepam, Diazepan, Hexalid, Normabel, Pax, Relanium, Stedon, Stesolid, Tranquirit, Valaxona, Valium, Vival	1963	2, 5, 10	10	1–1.5	32–205	anxiolytic, anticonvulsant, muscle relaxant, amnesic
Diclazepam		Research chemical	1, 2	2	1.5–3	42	anxiolytic, muscle relaxant
Estazolam	ProSom, Nuctalon	1990	1, 2	2	3–5	10–24	hypnotic, anxiolytic
Ethylbromazolam		Research chemical		4 (approx. half as potent as bromazolam)			anxiolytic
Ethyl carfluzepate		Not approved		2	1–5	11–24	hypnotic
Etizolam	Depas, Etilaam, Etizest, Pasaden	Often sold as a research chemical, but is approved for human use in many countries. Controlled substance in some US states, Canada, Germany, Austria, and others.	1	2	1–3	5-7	anxiolytic, muscle relaxant, anticonvulsant
Ethyl loflazepate	Meilax, Ronlax, Victan			2	2.5–3	73–119	anxiolytic
Flualprazolam		Research chemical	0.5, 1	0.25	1-2	12-22	anxiolytic, hypnotic
Flubromazepam	Templex	Research chemical	4, 8, 12	4	1.5–8	100–220	anxiolytic, hypnotic, amnesic, muscle relaxant, anticonvulsant
Flubromazolam	Remnon	Research chemical	0.25, 0.5	0.075	0.5-5	10-20	hypnotic
Fluclotizolam		Research chemical		0.25-0.5			anxiolytic
Flunitrazepam	Flunipam, Fluscand, Hipnosedon, Hypnodorm, Rohydorm, Rohypnol, Ronal, Vulbegal	1972	1, 2	1.5	0.5–3	18–200	hypnotic
Flunitrazolam		Research chemical	0.25, 0.5	0.1	0.5-1	5-13	hypnotic
Flurazepam	Dalmadorm, Dalmane, Fluzepam	1970	30	20-25	1–1.5	40–250	hypnotic
Flutazolam	Coreminal		4	10	1-3	47-100	hypnotic
Flutemazepam		Research chemical		1	0.5-5	8-20	hypnotic, anxiolytic, anticonvulsant, muscle relaxant
Flutoprazepam	Restas	1984	1, 2	2.5	0.5–9	87	hypnotic, anticonvulsant, muscle relaxant
Halazepam	Alapryl, Paxipam	1981	20, 40	40	3–6	15-35 [30-100]	anxiolytic
Ketazolam	Anxon, Sedotime	1980	15, 30, 45	20	2.5–6	30-100 [36-200]	anxiolytic
Loprazolam	Dormonoct, Havlane	1983	1, 2	1.5	2–5	6–20	hypnotic
Lorazepam	Ativan, Lorabenz, Lorafen, Lorenin, Lorsilan, Orfidal, Tavor, Temesta	1977	0.5, 1, 2, 2.5	1	2–4	10–20	amnesiac, anxiolytic, anticonvulsant, hypnotic, muscle relaxant
Lormetazepam	Loramet, Noctamid, Pronoctan	1984	1, 2	1.5	0.5–2	10-12	hypnotic, anxiolytic
Meclonazepam		Research chemical	6				anxiolytic
Medazepam	Ansilan, Mezapam, Nobrium, Raporan, Rudotel		10	10	4-8	36–200	anxiolytic
Metizolam		Research chemical	1, 2, 4	2–4		12	anxiolytic
Mexazolam	Melex, Sedoxil		0.5, 1		1–2		anxiolytic
Midazolam	Dormicum, Dormonid, Flormidal, Hypnovel, Versed	1985	7.5, 15	10 (oral) 4 (IV)	0.5–1	1.8-6	hypnotic, anticonvulsant
Nifoxipam		Research chemical	0.5, 1, 2				hypnotic
Nimetazepam	Erimin, Lavol	1984	5	2.5-5	0.5–3	14–30	hypnotic
Nitemazepam		Research chemical		2	0.5-5	10-27	hypnotic, anticonvulsant
Nitrazepam	Alodorm, Dumolid, Mogadon, Nitrazadon, Pacisyn	1965	5, 10	5	0.5–7	17–48	hypnotic, anticonvulsant
Nitrazolam		Research chemical	0.5, 1				hypnotic
Nordazepam	Madar, Stilny		5, 7.5, 15	10-15		30–150	anxiolytic
Norflurazepam		Research chemical		5		47-100	hypnotic
Oxazepam	Alepam, Medopam, Murelax, Noripam, Ox-Pam, Opamox, Oxabenz, Oxapax, Oxascand, Purata, Serax, Serenid, Serepax, Seresta, Sobril	1965	10, 15, 30, 50	30	3–4	4–11	anxiolytic
Phenazepam	Phenazepam, Phenzitat	Research chemical			1.5–4	60	anxiolytic, anticonvulsant
Pinazepam	Domar, Duna		5, 10			40–100	anxiolytic
Prazepam	Centrax, Demetrin, Lysanxia, Prazene	1976	10, 20, 30	15-20	2–6	36–200	anxiolytic
Premazepam		Not approved		15	2–6	10–13	anxiolytic
Pyrazolam		Research chemical	0.25, 0.5, 1		1–1.5	16–18	anxiolytic, amnesic
Quazepam	Doral, Quiedorm	1985	15	20	1–5	39–120	hypnotic
Rilmazafone	Rhythmy					11	hypnotic
Temazepam	Euhypnos, Normison, Restoril, Temaze, Tenox	1981	10, 20	15-20	0.5–3	4–11	hypnotic, anxiolytic, muscle relaxant
Tetrazepam	Clinoxam, Epsipam, Musaril, Myolastan		50		1–3	3–26	muscle relaxant, anxiolytic
Triazolam	Halcion, Notison, Rilamir, Somese	1980	0.125, 0.25	0.5	0.5–2	2	hypnotic
Drug Name	Common Trade Names	Year Approved	Typical Dosages of Oral Tablets (mg)	Approx. Equivalent Oral Dose to 10 mg Diazepam (mg)	Peak onset of action (hours)	Elimination Half-life of Active Metabolite (hours)	Primary Therapeutic Use

=== Atypical benzodiazepine receptor ligands ===
Drug Name	Common Trade Names	Year approved (US FDA)	Elimination Half-life of Active Metabolite (hours)	Primary Therapeutic Use
DMCM				anxiogenic, convulsant
Flumazenil (Note: Flumazenil is an imidazobenzodiazepine derivative, and in layman's terms, it is a benzodiazepine overdose antidote that is given intravenously in Intensive Care Units (ICUs) to reverse the effects of benzodiazepine overdoses, as well for overdoses of the non-benzodiazepine "Z-drugs" such as zolpidem. Flumazenil is contraindicated for benzodiazepine-tolerant patients in overdose cases. In such cases, the benefits are far outweighed by the risks, which include potential and severe seizures. The method by which flumazenil acts to prevent non-benzodiazepine tolerant overdose from causing potential harm is via preventing the benzodiazepines and Z-drugs from binding to the GABA_{A} receptors via competitive inhibition which the flumazenil creates. Clinical observation notating the patient's oxygen levels, respiratory, heart and blood pressure rates are used, as they are much safer than the potential seizure effects from flumazenil. Supportive care to mediate any problems resulting from abnormal rates of the pulmonary, respiratory, and cardiovascular systems is typically the only treatment that is required in benzodiazepine-only overdoses. In most cases, activated charcoal/carbon is often used to prevent benzodiazepines from being absorbed by the gastrointestinal tract, and the use of stomach-pumping/gastric lavage is no longer commonly used nor suggested by some toxicologists. Even in cases where other central nervous system (CNS) depressants (such as in combined benzodiazepine and tricyclic antidepressant/TCA overdoses) are detected and/or suspected, endotrachial intubation for the airway path and supportive oxygen are typically implemented and are much safer than flumazenil.)	Anexate, Lanexat, Mazicon, Romazicon		1	antidote
Eszopiclone^{§}	Lunesta	2004	6	hypnotic
Zaleplon^{§}	Sonata, Starnoc	1999	1	hypnotic
Zolpidem^{§}	Ambien, Nytamel, Sanval, Stilnoct, Stilnox, Sublinox (Canada), Xolnox, Zoldem, Zolnod	1992	2.6	hypnotic
Zopiclone^{§}	Imovane, Rhovane, Ximovan; Zileze; Zimoclone; Zimovane; Zopitan; Zorclone, Zopiklone	2004	4–6	hypnotic

=== Controversy ===
In 2015 the UK's House of Commons attempted to get a two to four week limit mandate for prescribing benzodiazepines to replace the two to four week benzodiazepine prescribing guidelines, which are merely recommended.

== Binding data and structure-activity relationship ==
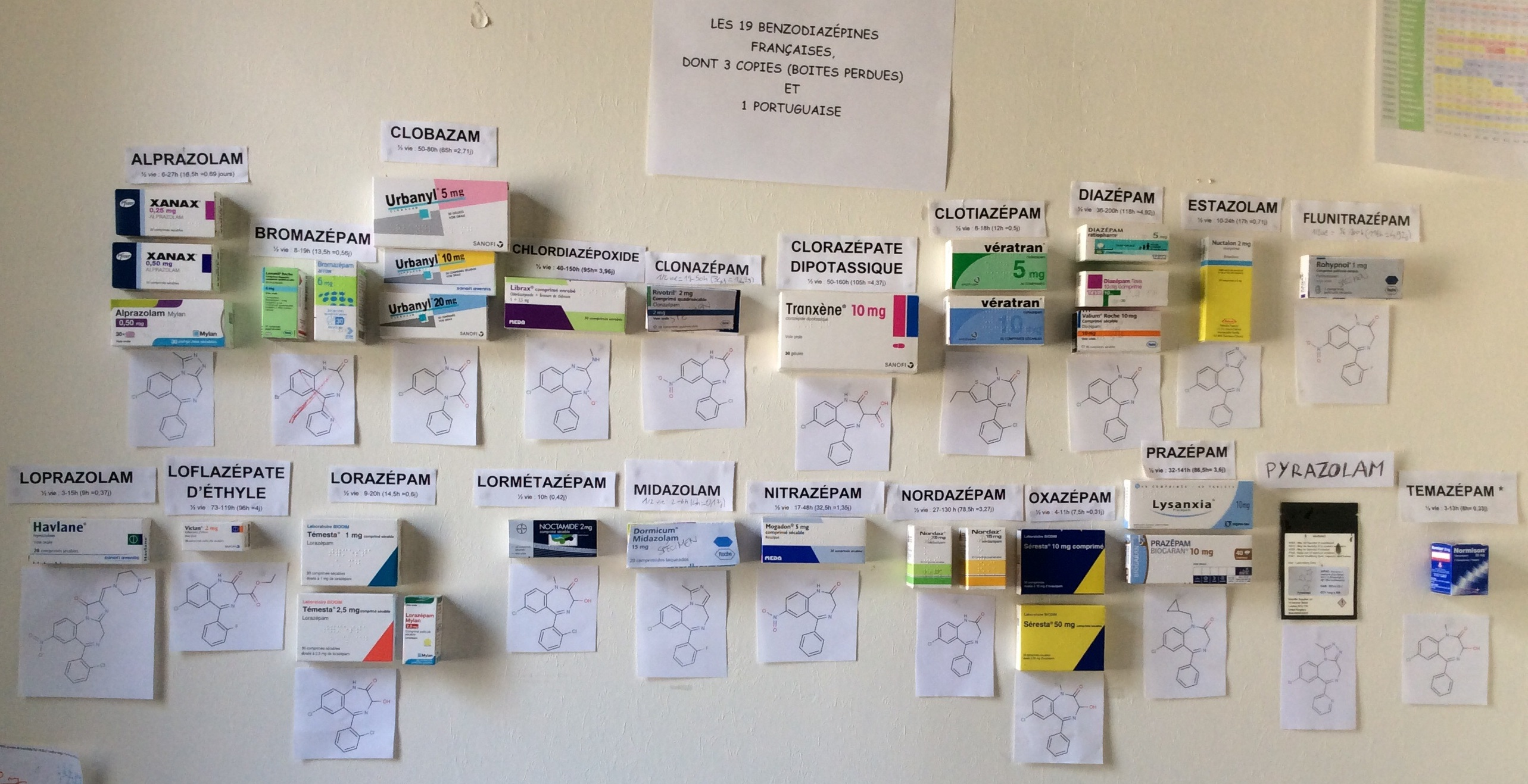
A variety of Benzodiazepines along with their molecular structure.

A large number of benzodiazepine derivatives have been synthesised and their structure-activity relationships explored in detail. This chart contains binding data for benzodiazepines and related drugs investigated by Roche up to the late 1990s (though in some cases the compounds were originally synthesised by other companies such as Takeda or Upjohn). Other benzodiazepines are also listed for comparison purposes, but it does not however include binding data for;

- Benzodiazepines developed in the former Soviet Union (e.g. phenazepam, gidazepam etc.)
- Benzodiazepines predominantly used only in Japan (e.g. nimetazepam, flutoprazepam etc.)
- 4,5-cyclised benzodiazepines (e.g. ketazolam, cloxazolam etc.), and other compounds not researched by Roche
- Benzodiazepines developed more recently (e.g. remimazolam, QH-ii-066, Ro48-6791 etc.)
- "Designer" benzodiazepines for which in vitro binding data are unavailable (e.g. flubromazolam, pyrazolam etc.)

While binding or activity data are available for most of these compounds also, the assay conditions vary between sources, meaning that in many cases the values are not suitable for a direct comparison. Many older sources used animal measures of activity (i.e. sedation or anticonvulsant activity) but did not measure in vitro binding to benzodiazepine receptors. See for instance Table 2 vs Table 11 in the Chem Rev paper, Table 2 lists in vitro pIC_{50} values matching those below, while Table 11 has pEC_{50} values derived from in vivo assays in mice, which show the same activity trends but cannot be compared directly, and includes data for compounds such as diclazepam and flubromazepam which are not available in the main data set.

Also note;

- IC_{50} / pIC_{50} values represent binding affinity only and do not reflect efficacy or pharmacokinetics, and some compounds listed are GABA_{A} antagonists rather than agonists (e.g. flumazenil).
- Low IC_{50} or high pIC_{50} values indicate tighter binding (pIC_{50} of 8.0 = IC_{50} of 10nM, pIC_{50} of 9.0 = IC_{50} of 1nM, etc.)
- These are non subtype selective IC_{50} values averaged across all GABA_{A} receptor subtypes, so subtype selective compounds with strong binding at one subtype but weak at others will appear unusually weak due to averaging of binding values (see e.g. CL-218,872)
- ^{†} indicates a predicted value from in silico modelling.
- Finally, note that the benzodiazepine core is a privileged scaffold, which has been used to derive drugs with diverse activity that is not limited to the GABA_{A} modulatory action of the classical benzodiazepines, such as devazepide and tifluadom, however these have not been included in the list below. 2,3-benzodiazepines such as tofisopam are also not listed, as these act primarily as AMPA receptor modulators, and are inactive at GABA_{A} receptors.

== Table ==
Table of benzodiazepines

Chemical structure	Code	pIC_{50} / IC_{50}	Chemical name	PubChem	CAS number
	Ro05-3061	7.3979 / 40nM	7-fluoro-5-phenyl-1H-benzo[e] [1,4]diazepin-2(3H)-one	75849	2648-00-2
	Ro05-4865	7.7696 / 17nM	7-fluoro-5-phenyl-1-methyl-1H-benzo[e] [1,4]diazepin-2(3H)-one	44366179	
	Ro05-6820	8.1308 / 7.4nM	7-fluoro-5-(2-fluorophenyl)-1H-benzo[e] [1,4]diazepin-2(3H)-one	44366116	
	Ro05-6822	8.2924 / 5.1nM	7-fluoro-5-(2-fluorophenyl)-1-methyl-1H-benzo[e] [1,4]diazepin-2(3H)-one	23275675	2024-34-2
	Iso-flubromazepam		7-fluoro-5-(2-bromophenyl)-1H-benzo[e] [1,4]diazepin-2(3H)-one	15292433	153873-96-2
	Nordazepam	8.0269 / 9.4nM	7-chloro-5-phenyl-1H-benzo[e] [1,4]diazepin-2(3H)-one	2997	1088-11-5
	Diazepam	8.0915 / 8.1nM	7-chloro-5-phenyl-1-methyl-1H-benzo[e] [1,4]diazepin-2(3H)-one	3016	439-14-5
	Norflurazepam (Ro05-3367)	8.699	7-chloro-5-(2-fluorophenyl)-1H-benzo[e] [1,4]diazepin-2(3H)-one	4540	2886-65-9
	Fludiazepam		7-chloro-5-(2-fluorophenyl)-1-methyl-1H-benzo[e] [1,4]diazepin-2(3H)-one	3369	3900-31-0
	Ro07-3953	8.7959 / 1.6nM	7-chloro-5-(2,6-difluorophenyl)-1H-benzo[e] [1,4]diazepin-2(3H)-one	23275763	
	Difludiazepam (Ro07-4065)	8.3872 / 4.1nM	7-chloro-5-(2,6-difluorophenyl)-1-methyl-1H-benzo[e] [1,4]diazepin-2(3H)-one	44366236	39080-67-6
	Delorazepam	8.7447 / 1.8nM	7-chloro-5-(2-chlorophenyl)-1H-benzo[e] [1,4]diazepin-2(3H)-one	17925	2894-67-9
	Diclazepam (Ro05-3448)	7.8 ^{†}	7-chloro-5-(2-chlorophenyl)-1-methyl-1H-benzo[e] [1,4]diazepin-2(3H)-one	76168	2894-68-0
	Ro05-4864	TSPO ligand	7-chloro-5-(4-chlorophenyl)-1-methyl-1H-benzo[e] [1,4]diazepin-2(3H)-one	1688	14439-61-3
	2′-Bromodiazepam	EC_{50} 3.67nM	7-chloro-5-(2-bromophenyl)-1-methyl-1H-benzo[e] [1,4]diazepin-2(3H)-one	12388862	
	2′-Bromonordazepam	EC_{50} 0.862nM	7-chloro-5-(2-bromophenyl)-1H-benzo[e] [1,4]diazepin-2(3H)-one	760868	63574-83-4
	Ro07-5193	8.5229	7-chloro-5-(2-chloro-6-fluorophenyl)-1H-benzo[e] [1,4]diazepin-2(3H)-one	44366219	
	Ro22-3294	8.1549	7-chloro-5-(2,6-dichlorophenyl)-1H-benzo[e] [1,4]diazepin-2(3H)-one	12790028	
	Ro07-5220	8.2596	7-chloro-5-(2,6-dichlorophenyl)-1-methyl-1H-benzo[e] [1,4]diazepin-2(3H)-one	9975396	30144-88-8
	Desalkylgidazepam	7.8 ^{†}	7-bromo-5-phenyl-1H-benzo[e] [1,4]diazepin-2(3H)-one	76167	2894-61-3
	QH-II-063		7-bromo-5-phenyl-1-methyl-1H-benzo[e] [1,4]diazepin-2(3H)-one	627432	28611-28-1
	Phenazepam	8.4 ^{†}	7-bromo-5-(2-chlorophenyl)-1H-benzo[e] [1,4]diazepin-2(3H)-one	40113	51753-57-2
	Flubromazepam (JYI-42)	7.6 ^{†}	7-bromo-5-(2-fluorophenyl)-1H-benzo[e] [1,4]diazepin-2(3H)-one	12947024	2647-50-9
	Flubrometazepam		7-bromo-5-(2-fluorophenyl)-1-methyl-1H-benzo[e] [1,4]diazepin-2(3H)-one	135809	86890-79-1
	SH-I-048A		(3S)-7-bromo-5-(2-fluorophenyl)-3-methyl-1H-benzo[e] [1,4]diazepin-2(3H)-one	49850464	872874-11-8
	Dibromazepam		7-bromo-5-(2-bromophenyl)-1H-benzo[e] [1,4]diazepin-2(3H)-one	633833	65247-10-1
	Gidazepam	6.4 ^{†}	2-(7-bromo-2-oxo-5-phenyl-2,3-dihydro-1H-benzo[e] [1,4]diazepin-1-yl)acetohydrazide	121919	129186-29-4
	Ro13-3780	8.6198	7-bromo-5-(2,6-difluorophenyl)-1-methyl-1H-benzo[e] [1,4]diazepin-2(3H)-one	9975396	103380-73-0
	Ro07-9749		7-iodo-5-(2-fluorophenyl)-1H-benzo[e] [1,4]diazepin-2(3H)-one	3082318	30843-56-2
	Ro07-9957	8.5376	7-iodo-5-(2-fluorophenyl)-1-methyl-1H-benzo[e] [1,4]diazepin-2(3H)-one	118749	
	Ro05-2904	7.8861 / 13nM	7-trifluoromethyl-5-phenyl-1H-benzo[e] [1,4]diazepin-2(3H)-one	16795	2285-16-7
	Ro14-3074	8.2757 / 5.3nM	7-azido-5-(2-fluorophenyl)-1H-benzo[e] [1,4]diazepin-2(3H)-one		
	Nitrazepam	8.0 / 10nM	7-nitro-5-phenyl-1H-benzo[e] [1,4]diazepin-2(3H)-one	4506	146-22-5
	Nimetazepam		7-nitro-5-phenyl-1-methyl-1H-benzo[e] [1,4]diazepin-2(3H)-one	4496	2011-67-8
	Ro05-4435	8.829 / 1.5nM	7-nitro-5-(2-fluorophenyl)-1H-benzo[e] [1,4]diazepin-2(3H)-one	520217	2558-30-7
	Flunitrazepam	8.4202 / 3.8nM	7-nitro-5-(2-fluorophenyl)-1-methyl-1H-benzo[e] [1,4]diazepin-2(3H)-one	3380	1622-62-4
	Clonazepam	8.7447 / 1.8nM	7-nitro-5-(2-chlorophenyl)-1H-benzo[e] [1,4]diazepin-2(3H)-one	2802	1622-61-3
	N-Methylclonazepam(Ro05-4082)	8.6576	7-nitro-5-(2-chlorophenyl)-1-methyl-1H-benzo[e] [1,4]diazepin-2(3H)-one	528222	5527-71-9
	Ro05-3590	8.4559 / 3.5nM	7-nitro-5-[2-(trifluoromethyl)phenyl]-1H-benzo[e] [1,4]diazepin-2(3H)-one	15024	1427-45-8
	QH-146		7-nitro-5-(2-nitrophenyl)-1-methyl-1H-benzo[e] [1,4]diazepin-2(3H)-one	44383992	
	Ro20-7736	7.0177 / 96nM	7-hydroxyamino-5-(2-fluorophenyl)-1-methyl-1H-benzo[e] [1,4]diazepin-2(3H)-one		
	Ro05-3072	6.4134 / 386nM	7-amino-5-phenyl-1H-benzo[e] [1,4]diazepin-2(3H)-one	78641	4928-02-3
	Ro05-4318	6.3372 / 460nM	7-amino-5-phenyl-1-methyl-1H-benzo[e] [1,4]diazepin-2(3H)-one	23275339	4959-16-4
	Ro20-1815	7.1871 / 65nM	7-amino-5-(2-fluorophenyl)-1-methyl-1H-benzo[e] [1,4]diazepin-2(3H)-one	92294	34084-50-9
	Ro05-4619	7.1249 / 75nM	7-amino-5-(2-chlorophenyl)-1H-benzo[e] [1,4]diazepin-2(3H)-one	188298	4959-17-5
	Ro05-3308	IC_{50} >1000nM	N-(2-oxo-5-phenyl-2,3-dihydro-1H-benzo[e] [1,4]diazepin-7-yl)acetamide		
	Ro12-6377	7.1249 / 455nM	1-(5-(2-fluorophenyl)-1-methyl-2-oxo-2,5-dihydro-1H-benzo[e] [1,4]diazepin-7-yl)-3-methylurea		
	Ro05-9090	IC_{50} >1000nM	7-(aminomethyl)-1-methyl-5-phenyl-1H-benzo[e] [1,4]diazepin-2(3H)-one		
	Ro05-3343	IC_{50} >1000nM	N,N-dimethyl-2-oxo-5-phenyl-2,3-dihydro-1H-benzo[e] [1,4]diazepine-7-sulfonamide	214460	12037-79-5
	Ro05-4528	6.4202 / 380nM	7-cyano-5-phenyl-1-methyl-1H-benzo[e] [1,4]diazepin-2(3H)-one		
	Ro20-2541	7.5229 / 30nM	7-cyano-5-(2-fluorophenyl)-1-methyl-1H-benzo[e] [1,4]diazepin-2(3H)-one		
	Ro20-2533	7.4437 / 36nM	7-ethyl-5-phenyl-1H-benzo[e] [1,4]diazepin-2(3H)-one	10264786	
	Ro20-5747	7.6198 / 24nM	7-vinyl-5-phenyl-1H-benzo[e] [1,4]diazepin-2(3H)-one	44366036	
	QH-ii-066	7.4 ^{†}	7-ethynyl-5-phenyl-1-methyl-1H-benzo[e] [1,4]diazepin-2(3H)-one	9838431	183239-39-6
	OMB-18		7-ethynyl-5-(2-fluorophenyl)-1-methyl-1H-benzo[e] [1,4]diazepin-2(3H)-one	89276170	
	XLI-352		7-ethynyl-5-(2-chlorophenyl)-1-methyl-1H-benzo[e] [1,4]diazepin-2(3H)-one	21065236	
	Ro20-5397	7.3665 / 43nM	7-formyl-5-phenyl-1H-benzo[e] [1,4]diazepin-2(3H)-one		
	Ro20-3053	7.7447 / 18nM	7-acetyl-5-phenyl-1H-benzo[e] [1,4]diazepin-2(3H)-one	21828109	
	Ro05-2921	6.4559 / 350nM	5-phenyl-1H-benzo[e] [1,4]diazepin-2(3H)-one	76175	2898-08-0
	Ro05-3663	IC_{50} >1000nM	5-methyl-1H-benzo[e] [1,4]diazepin-2(3H)-one	5080	70656-87-0
	Ro05-4336	7.6778 / 21nM	5-(2-fluorophenyl)-1H-benzo[e] [1,4]diazepin-2(3H)-one	13292074	
	Ro07-4419	7.7212 / 19nM	5-(2,6-difluorophenyl)-1H-benzo[e] [1,4]diazepin-2(3H)-one	44366255	
	Ro05-4520	7.8539 / 14nM	5-(2-fluorophenyl)-1-methyl-1H-benzo[e] [1,4]diazepin-2(3H)-one	193319	844-11-1
	Ro05-4608	8.4202	5-(2-chlorophenyl)-1-methyl-1H-benzo[e] [1,4]diazepin-2(3H)-one	10469149	
	Ro05-3546	6.4949 / 320nM	6-chloro-5-phenyl-1H-benzo[e] [1,4]diazepin-2(3H)-one	14590445	
	Ro13-0699	6.8239 / 150nM	6-chloro-5-(2-fluorophenyl)-1-methyl-1H-benzo[e] [1,4]diazepin-2(3H)-one	44377764	
	Ro07-6198	7.5528 / 28nM	8-chloro-5-(2,6-difluorophenyl)-1H-benzo[e] [1,4]diazepin-2(3H)-one	23275762	
	Ro20-8895	7.7212 / 19nM	8-methyl-5-(2-fluorophenyl)-1H-benzo[e] [1,4]diazepin-2(3H)-one	44366169	
	Ro13-0593	7.1427 / 72nM	9-chloro-5-(2-fluorophenyl)-1-methyl-1H-benzo[e] [1,4]diazepin-2(3H)-one		
	Ro13-0882	IC_{50} 300nM	6,8-dichloro-5-(2-fluorophenyl)-1-methyl-1H-benzo[e] [1,4]diazepin-2(3H)-one		
	Ro22-6762	7.3979 / 40nM	7,8-dichloro-5-phenyl-1-methyl-1H-benzo[e] [1,4]diazepin-2(3H)-one	44366089	
	Ro20-8065	8.4437 / 3.6nM	7,8-dichloro-5-(2-fluorophenyl)-1H-benzo[e] [1,4]diazepin-2(3H)-one	10358803	88695-06-1
	Ro20-8552	7.8539 / 14nM	7-methyl-8-chloro-5-(2-fluorophenyl)-1H-benzo[e] [1,4]diazepin-2(3H)-one	44366138	
	Ro05-2750	7.4318 / 37nM	6,8-dichloro-5-phenyl-1H-benzo[e] [1,4]diazepin-2(3H)-one		
	Ro14-2312	IC_{50} >1000nM	6-amino-8-chloro-5-(2-fluorophenyl)-1-methyl-1H-benzo[e] [1,4]diazepin-2(3H)-one		
	Ro07-3609	7.284			
	Ro11-8125	7.4318 / 37nM	5-(2-chlorophenyl)-1H-thieno[2,3-e] [1,4]diazepin-2(3H)-one		
	Ro08-6739	IC_{50} 70nM	7-chloro-5-phenyl-1H-thieno[2,3-e] [1,4]diazepin-2(3H)-one		
	Ro09-9212	8.4089 / 3.9nM	7-chloro-5-(2-chlorophenyl)-1H-thieno[2,3-e] [1,4]diazepin-2(3H)-one	135721042	
	Ro10-2643	IC_{50} 9.4nM	7-chloro-5-(2-chlorophenyl)-1H-thieno[3,2-e] [1,4]diazepin-2(3H)-one		
	Clotiazepam		7-ethyl-5-(2-chlorophenyl)-1-methyl-1H-thieno[2,3-e] [1,4]diazepin-2(3H)-one	2811	33671-46-4
	Bentazepam	8.5 ^{†}	5-phenyl-3,5a,6,7,8,9-hexahydro-2H-[1]benzothieno[2,3-e] [1,4]diazepin-2(3H)-one	34592	29462-18-8
	Lopirazepam		7-chloro-5-(2-chlorophenyl)-3-hydroxy-1,3-dihydro-2H-pyrido[3,2-e] [1,4]diazepin-2-one	68672	42863-81-0
	Premazepam	6.7696 / 170nM	6,7-dimethyl-5-phenyl-3,7-dihydropyrrolo[3,4-e] [1,4]diazepin-2(1H)-one	72104	57435-86-6
	Ripazepam		1-ethyl-3-methyl-8-phenyl-4,6-dihydropyrazolo[4,3-e] [1,4]diazepin-5(1H)-one	33474	26308-28-1
	Zolazepam		1,3,8-trimethyl-4-(2-fluorophenyl)-6,8-dihydropyrazolo[3,4-e] [1,4]diazepin-7(1H)-one	35775	31352-82-6
	Zomebazam	8.1 ^{†}	1,3,8-trimethyl-4-phenyl-6,8-dihydropyrazolo[4,3-b] [1,4]diazepine-5,7(1H,4H)-dione	132677	78466-70-3
	Ro17-2221	6.585 / 260nM	1-(2-aminoethyl)-5-phenyl-1H-benzo[e] [1,4]diazepin-2(3H)-one		
	Ro07-5096	IC_{50} >1000nM	2-(7-chloro-5-(2-fluorophenyl)-2-oxo-2,3-dihydro-1H-benzo[e] [1,4]diazepin-1-yl)acetic acid		
	Ro08-3026	7.2007	7-((2-aminoethoxy)methyl)-5-(2-chlorophenyl)-1H-benzo[e][1,4]diazepin-2(3H)-one		
	Halazepam	7.0362 / 92nM	7-chloro-5-phenyl-1-(2,2,2-trifluoroethyl)-1H-benzo[e] [1,4]diazepin-2(3H)-one	31640	23092-17-3
	Quazepam		7-chloro-5-(2-fluorophenyl)-1-(2,2,2-trifluoroethyl)-1H-benzo[e] [1,4]diazepin-2(3H)-thione	4999	36735-22-5
	Fletazepam		7-chloro-5-(2-fluorophenyl)-1-(2,2,2-trifluoroethyl)-1H-benzo[e] [1,4]diazepine	36834	34482-99-0
	Pinazepam	7.0339 / 92.5nM	7-chloro-5-phenyl-1-(prop-2-yn-1-yl)-1H-benzo[e] [1,4]diazepin-2(3H)-one	40391	52463-83-9
	Prazepam	IC_{50} 110nM	7-chloro-5-phenyl-1-cyclopropylmethyl-1H-benzo[e] [1,4]diazepin-2(3H)-one	4890	2955-38-6
	Flutoprazepam	6.6 ^{†}	7-chloro-5-(2-fluorophenyl)-1-cyclopropylmethyl-1H-benzo[e] [1,4]diazepin-2(3H)-one	3400	25967-29-7
	Cloniprazepam	7.8 ^{†}	7-nitro-5-(2-chlorophenyl)-1-cyclopropylmethyl-1H-benzo[e] [1,4]diazepin-2(3H)-one		
	Ro20-1310	6.2076 / 620nM	7-chloro-5-phenyl-1-(t-butyl)-1H-benzo[e] [1,4]diazepin-2(3H)-one		
	Fosazepam		7-chloro-5-phenyl-1-(dimethylphosphorylmethyl)-1H-benzo[e] [1,4]diazepin-2(3H)-one	37114	35322-07-7
	Iclazepam		7-chloro-5-phenyl-1-[2-(cyclopropylmethoxy)ethyl]-1H-benzo[e] [1,4]diazepin-2(3H)-one	68777	57916-70-8
	Tolufazepam		7-chloro-5-(2-chlorophenyl)-1-[2-(4-methylphenyl)sulfonylethyl]-1H-benzo[e] [1,4]diazepin-2(3H)-one	65647	86273-92-9
	Elfazepam	6.9 ^{†}	7-chloro-5-(2-fluorophenyl)-1-(2-ethylsulfonylethyl)-1H-benzo[e] [1,4]diazepin-2(3H)-one	65445	52042-01-0
	Reclazepam		2-[7-chloro-5-(2-chlorophenyl)-2,3-dihydro-1H-1,4-benzodiazepin-1-yl]-1,3-oxazol-4(5H)-one	3052777	76053-16-2
	Ro07-1986	8.0809 / 8.3nM	1-(2-aminoethyl)-7-chloro-5-(2-fluorophenyl)-1H-benzo[e] [1,4]diazepin-2(3H)-one		
	Flurazepam	7.8297	7-chloro-1-[2-(diethylamino)ethyl]-5-(2-fluorophenyl)-1,3-dihydro-2H-1,4-benzodiazepin-2-one	3393	17617-23-1
	Ro07-2750	7.6108 / 24.5nM	7-chloro-5-(2-fluorophenyl)-1-(2-hydroxyethyl)-1H-benzo[e] [1,4]diazepin-2(3H)-one		
	Motrazepam	IC_{50} 430nM	1-(methoxymethyl)-7-nitro-5-phenyl-1H-benzo[e] [1,4]diazepin-2(3H)-one	65764	29442-58-8
	Ro08-9013	7.3716			
	Proflazepam	6.8539 / 140nM	7-chloro-1-(2,3-dihydroxypropyl)-5-(2-fluorophenyl)-1H-benzo[e] [1,4]diazepin-2(3H)-one	3050433	52829-30-8
	Ro22-4683	6.5229 / 300nM	7-nitro-5-(2-fluorophenyl)-1-(t-butyl)-1H-benzo[e] [1,4]diazepin-2(3H)-one		
	Ro15-8852	6.1391 / 726nM	5-(2-chlorophenyl)-4-methyl-7-nitro-4,5-dihydro-1H-benzo[e] [1,4]diazepin-2(3H)-one		
	Chlordiazepoxide	6.4535 / 352nM	7-chloro-2-methylamino-5-phenyl-3H-benzo[e] [1,4]diazepine-4-oxide	2712	58-25-3
	Cyprazepam		7-chloro-N-(cyclopropylmethyl)-4-hydroxy-5-phenyl-3H-benzo[e] [1,4]diazepin-2-imine	27452	15687-07-7
	Uldazepam	7.6 ^{†}	7-chloro-5-(2-chlorophenyl)-N-prop-2-enoxy-3H-benzo[e] [1,4]diazepin-2-amine	34274	28546-58-9
	Demoxepam	6.5086 / 310nM	7-chloro-1,3-dihydro-5-phenyl-2H-benzo[e] [1,4]diazepin-2-one-4-oxide	13756	963-39-3
	Medazepam	IC_{50} 870nM	7-chloro-5-phenyl-1-methyl-1H-benzo[e] [1,4]diazepine	4041	2898-12-6
	Tuclazepam	7.7 ^{†}	7-chloro-5-(2-chlorophenyl)-2-(hydroxymethyl)-1-methyl-2,3-dihydro-1H-benzo[e] [1,4]diazepine	3050405	51037-88-8
	Metaclazepam		7-bromo-5-(2-chlorophenyl)-2-(methoxymethyl)-1-methyl-2,3-dihydro-1H-benzo[e] [1,4]diazepine	71272	84031-17-4
	Sulazepam	7.7 ^{†}	7-chloro-5-phenyl-1-methyl-1H-benzo[e] [1,4]diazepin-2(3H)-thione	17931	2898-13-7
	Tetrazepam	7.4685 / 34nM	7-chloro-5-(cyclohexen-1-yl)-1-methyl-1H-benzo[e] [1,4]diazepin-2(3H)-one	25215	10379-14-3
	Nortetrazepam	IC_{50} 34nM	7-chloro-5-(cyclohexen-1-yl)-1H-benzo[e] [1,4]diazepin-2(3H)-one	166581	10379-11-0
	Menitrazepam		7-nitro-5-(cyclohexen-1-yl)-1-methyl-1H-benzo[e] [1,4]diazepin-2(3H)-one	189875	28781-64-8
	Ro05-3328	7.0605 / 87nM	7-chloro-5-cyclohexyl-1H-benzo[e] [1,4]diazepin-2(3H)-one		
	Clazolam	8.1 ^{†}	2-chloro-5-methyl-5,9,10,14b-tetrahydroisoquino[2,1-d] [1,4]benzodiazepin-6(7H)-one	24107	7492-29-7
	Bromazepam	7.7447 / 18nM	7-bromo-5-(pyridin-2-yl)-1H-benzo[e] [1,4]diazepin-2(3H)-one	2441	1812-30-2
	Methylbromazepam		7-bromo-5-(pyridin-2-yl)-1-methyl-1H-benzo[e] [1,4]diazepin-2(3H)-one	630183	1812-33-5
	Pyridazino-diazepam		7-chloro-5-(pyridazin-3-yl)-1-methyl-1H-benzo[e] [1,4]diazepin-2(3H)-one		
	Ro5-3335		7-Chloro-1,3-dihydro-5-(1H-pyrrol-2-yl)-2H-1,4-benzodiazepin-2-one	64983	
	SCHEMBL9684958		7-chloro-5-(1H-pyrazol-5-yl)-1H-benzo[e] [1,4]diazepin-2(3H)-one	21738192	
	Compound 6a	9.5 ^{†}	7-chloro-5-(3,5-dimethyl-4H-1,2,4-triazol-4-yl)-1,3-dihydro-2H-1,4-benzodiazepin-2-one		
	JC-184		7-bromo-5-(2-thienyl)-1H-benzo[e] [1,4]diazepin-2(3H)-one	21065240	
	BDBM50083903		7-chloro-5-(2-furanyl)-1-methyl-1H-benzo[e] [1,4]diazepin-2(3H)-one	10423506	
	Ro05-5605	6.5376			
	Ro11-3129	8.1871	(+)-2-amino-N-[2-(2-chlorobenzoyl)-4-nitrophenyl]propanamide	21413751	65607-70-7
	Ro03-7355	6.3768			
	Ro11-4878	8.4559 / 3.5nM	7-chloro-5-(2-fluorophenyl)-3-methyl-1H-benzo[e] [1,4]diazepin-2(3H)-one		
	Meclonazepam	8.9208 / 1.2nM	(3S)-7-nitro-5-(2-chlorophenyl)-3-methyl-1H-benzo[e] [1,4]diazepin-2(3H)-one	3033985	58662-84-3
	Ro11-6896	8.1549 / 7nM	7-nitro-5-(2-fluorophenyl)-1,3-dimethyl-1H-benzo[e] [1,4]diazepin-2(3H)-one		
	Ro06-7263	7.3098 / 49nM	1,7-dichloro-5-phenyl-3-methyl-1H-benzo[e] [1,4]diazepin-2(3H)-one		
	Oxazepam	7.7447 / 18nM	7-chloro-3-hydroxy-5-phenyl-1H-benzo[e] [1,4]diazepin-2(3H)-one	4616	604-75-1
	Temazepam	7.7959 / 16nM	7-chloro-3-hydroxy-5-phenyl-1-methyl-1H-benzo[e] [1,4]diazepin-2(3H)-one	5391	846-50-4
	Lorazepam	8.4559 / 3.5nM	7-chloro-3-hydroxy-5-(2-chlorophenyl)-1H-benzo[e] [1,4]diazepin-2(3H)-one	3958	846-49-1
	Lormetazepam		7-chloro-3-hydroxy-5-(2-chlorophenyl)-1-methyl-1H-benzo[e] [1,4]diazepin-2(3H)-one	13314	848-75-9
	Flutemazepam	8.1 ^{†}	7-chloro-3-hydroxy-5-(2-fluorophenyl)-1-methyl-1H-benzo[e] [1,4]diazepin-2(3H)-one	40344	52391-89-6
	Cinolazepam		7-chloro-3-hydroxy-5-(2-fluorophenyl)-1-(2-cyanoethyl)-1H-benzo[e] [1,4]diazepin-2(3H)-one	3033621	75696-02-5
	Doxefazepam		7-chloro-3-hydroxy-5-(2-fluorophenyl)-1-(2-hydroxyethyl)-1H-benzo[e] [1,4]diazepin-2(3H)-one	38668	40762-15-0
	Nifoxipam	8.5 ^{†}	7-nitro-3-hydroxy-5-(2-fluorophenyl)-1H-benzo[e] [1,4]diazepin-2(3H)-one	3058221	74723-10-7
	Nitemazepam		7-nitro-3-hydroxy-5-phenyl-1-methyl-1H-benzo[e] [1,4]diazepin-2(3H)-one	12362353	40762-03-6
	3-Hydroxyphenazepam	8.7 ^{†}	7-bromo-3-hydroxy-5-(2-chlorophenyl)-1H-benzo[e] [1,4]diazepin-2(3H)-one	125820	70030-11-4
	Cinazepam		7-bromo-3-succinyloxy-5-(2-chlorophenyl)-1H-benzo[e] [1,4]diazepin-2(3H)-one	629281	172986-25-3
	Pivoxazepam		7-chloro-3-pivalyloxy-5-phenyl-1H-benzo[e] [1,4]diazepin-2(3H)-one	68722	55299-10-0
	Camazepam	6.0458	7-chloro-1-methyl-2-oxo-5-phenyl-2,3-dihydro-1H-benzo[e] [1,4]diazepin-3-yl N,N-dimethylcarbamate	37367	36104-80-0
	Clorazepate	IC_{50} 59nM	7-chloro-2-oxo-5-phenyl-1H-benzo[e] [1,4]diazepine-3-carboxylic acid	2809	23887-31-2
	Nitrazepate		7-nitro-2-oxo-5-phenyl-1H-benzo[e] [1,4]diazepine-3-carboxylic acid	21740	5571-84-6
	Ethyl carfluzepate	8.0 ^{†}	ethyl 7-chloro-5-(2-fluorophenyl)-1-(methylcarbamoyl)-2-oxo-3H-benzo[e] [1,4]diazepine-3-carboxylate	68856	65400-85-3
	Ethyl dirazepate	7.5 ^{†}	ethyl 7-chloro-5-(2-chlorophenyl)-2-oxo-3H-benzo[e] [1,4]diazepine-3-carboxylate	208941	23980-14-5
	Ethyl loflazepate		ethyl 7-chloro-5-(2-fluorophenyl)-2-oxo-3H-benzo[e] [1,4]diazepine-3-carboxylate	3299	29177-84-2
	Carburazepam	7.9 ^{†}	7-chloro-1-methyl-2-oxo-5-phenyl-1,2,3,5-tetrahydro-4H-benzo[e] [1,4]diazepine-4-carboxamide	68787	59009-93-7
	Ro20-7078	8.2757 / 5.3nM	3,7-dichloro-5-(2-fluorophenyl)-1H-benzo[e] [1,4]diazepin-2(3H)-one		
	Clobazam	6.8861 / 130nM	7-chloro-1-methyl-5-phenyl-1H-1,5-benzodiazepine-2,4(3H,5H)-dione	2789	22316-47-8
	Desmethylclobazam	6.6778 / 210nM	7-chloro-5-phenyl-1H-1,5-benzodiazepine-2,4(3H,5H)-dione		
	Triflubazam	8.4 ^{†}	7-trifluoromethyl-1-methyl-5-phenyl-1H-1,5-benzodiazepine-2,4(3H,5H)-dione	2789	22316-47-8
	Lofendazam		7-chloro-5-phenyl-1,3,4,5-tetrahydro-4H-1,5-benzodiazepin-4-one	71709	29176-29-2
	Arfendazam	8.3 ^{†}	ethyl 7-chloro-4-oxo-5-phenyl-2,3-dihydro-1,5-benzodiazepine-1-carboxylate	65803	37669-57-1
	CP-1414S	7.9 ^{†}	8-nitro-1-phenyl-4-amino-3H-1,5-benzodiazepin-2-one	37594	36975-99-2
	Compound 6i	8.6 ^{†}	9-chloro-11-phenyl-6,11-dihydro-5H-pyrimido[4,5-b][1,5]benzodiazepin-5-one		
	Oxazolam		10-chloro-2-methyl-11b-phenyl-2,3,7,11b-tetrahydrobenzo[f]oxazolo[3,2-d] [1,4]diazepin-6(5H)-one	62779	24143-17-7
	Cloxazolam		10-chloro-11b-(2-chlorophenyl)-2,3,5,7-tetrahydro-[1,3]oxazolo[3,2-d] [1,4]benzodiazepin-6(5H)-one	2816	24166-13-0
	Mexazolam		10-chloro-11b-(2-chlorophenyl)-3-methyl-2,3,7,11b-tetrahydro[1,3]oxazolo[3,2-d] [1,4]benzodiazepin-6(5H)-one	4177	31868-18-5
	Flutazolam		10-chloro-11b-(2-fluorophenyl)-7-(2-hydroxyethyl)-3,5-dihydro-2H-[1,3]oxazolo[3,2-d] [1,4]benzodiazepin-6(5H)-one	3398	27060-91-9
	Haloxazolam		10-bromo-11b-(2-fluorophenyl)-2,3,5,7-tetrahydro-[1,3]oxazolo[3,2-d] [1,4]benzodiazepin-6(5H)-one	3563	59128-97-1
	Ketazolam		11-chloro-8,12b-dihydro-2,8-dimethyl-12b-phenyl-4H-[1,3]oxazino[3,2-d] [1,4]benzodiazepine-4,7(6H)-dione	33746	27223-35-4
	U-35005	8.3665 / 4.3nM	6-(2-chlorophenyl)-1-methyl-4H-benzo[f] [1,2,4]triazolo[4,3-a] [1,4]diazepine	21680194	
	4'-Chlorodeschloroalprazolam		6-(4-chlorophenyl)-1-methyl-4H-[1,2,4]triazolo[4,3-a][1,4]benzodiazepine	142641556	92262-72-1
	Estazolam	8.0706 / 8.5nM	8-chloro-6-phenyl-4H-benzo[f] [1,2,4]triazolo[4,3-a] [1,4]diazepine	3261	29975-16-4
	Alprazolam	7.699 / 20nM	8-chloro-6-phenyl-1-methyl-4H-benzo[f] [1,2,4]triazolo[4,3-a] [1,4]diazepine	2118	28981-97-7
	Triazolam	8.3979 / 4nM	8-chloro-6-(2-chlorophenyl)-1-methyl-4H-benzo[f] [1,2,4]triazolo[4,3-a] [1,4]diazepine	5556	28911-01-5
	alpha-Hydroxytriazolam	8.3768 / 4.2nM	8-chloro-6-(2-chlorophenyl)-1-hydroxymethyl-4H-benzo[f] [1,2,4]triazolo[4,3-a] [1,4]diazepine	1963	37115-45-0
	Flualprazolam	8.3 ^{†}	8-chloro-6-(2-fluorophenyl)-1-methyl-4H-benzo[f] [1,2,4]triazolo[4,3-a] [1,4]diazepine	10359044	28910-91-0
	Ethylflualprazolam		8-chloro-6-(2-fluorophenyl)-1-ethyl-4H-benzo[f] [1,2,4]triazolo[4,3-a] [1,4]diazepine		
	Cyclopropylflualprazolam		8-chloro-6-(2-fluorophenyl)-1-(cyclopropyl)-4H-benzo[f] [1,2,4]triazolo[4,3-a] [1,4]diazepine		
	Iso-flualprazolam		8-fluoro-6-(2-chlorophenyl)-1-methyl-4H-benzo[f] [1,2,4]triazolo[4,3-a] [1,4]diazepine		
	Desmethyltriazolam	8.3 ^{†}	8-chloro-6-(2-chlorophenyl)-4H-benzo[f] [1,2,4]triazolo[4,3-a] [1,4]diazepine	826660	42292-42-2
	Nitrazolam	8.5 ^{†}	8-nitro-6-phenyl-1-methyl-4H-benzo[f] [1,2,4]triazolo[4,3-a] [1,4]diazepine	20317278	28910-99-8
	Desmethylnitrazolam	8.8 ^{†}	8-nitro-6-phenyl-4H-benzo[f] [1,2,4]triazolo[4,3-a] [1,4]diazepine	20317280	30858-58-3
	Clonazolam	9.5 ^{†}	8-nitro-6-(2-chlorophenyl)-1-methyl-4H-benzo[f] [1,2,4]triazolo[4,3-a] [1,4]diazepine	12317881	33887-02-4
	Flunitrazolam	8.8 ^{†}	8-nitro-6-(2-fluorophenyl)-1-methyl-4H-benzo[f] [1,2,4]triazolo[4,3-a] [1,4]diazepine	137700379	2243815-18-9
	Flubromazolam (JYI-73)	8.8 ^{†}	8-bromo-6-(2-fluorophenyl)-1-methyl-4H-benzo[f] [1,2,4]triazolo[4,3-a] [1,4]diazepine	21930924	612526-40-6
	Fluiodomazolam (BDBM50011621)		8-iodo-6-(2-fluorophenyl)-1-methyl-4H-benzo[f] [1,2,4]triazolo[4,3-a] [1,4]diazepine	14851835	
	Triflumazolam (SCHEMBL7327294)		8-trifluoromethyl-6-phenyl-1-methyl-4H-benzo[f] [1,2,4]triazolo[4,3-a] [1,4]diazepine	19010444	28910-98-7
	JYI-70		8-ethynyl-6-(2-fluorophenyl)-1-methyl-4H-benzo[f] [1,2,4]triazolo[4,3-a] [1,4]diazepine	14851900	
	XLI-296		8-ethynyl-6-(2-chlorophenyl)-1-methyl-4H-benzo[f] [1,2,4]triazolo[4,3-a] [1,4]diazepine	14851901	
	Clobromazolam (DM-II-90)	8.2 ^{†}	8-bromo-6-(2-chlorophenyl)-1-methyl-4H-benzo[f] [1,2,4]triazolo[4,3-a] [1,4]diazepine	1032830	87213-50-1
	Bromazolam (XLI-268)	8.5 ^{†}	8-bromo-6-phenyl-1-methyl-4H-benzo[f] [1,2,4]triazolo[4,3-a] [1,4]diazepine	12562546	71368-80-4
	Ethylbromazolam		8-bromo-6-phenyl-1-ethyl-4H-benzo[f] [1,2,4]triazolo[4,3-a] [1,4]diazepine		105470-75-5
	Pyrazolam (SH-I-04)	8.1 ^{†}	8-bromo-6-(pyridin-2-yl)-1-methyl-4H-benzo[f] [1,2,4]triazolo[4,3-a] [1,4]diazepine	12562545	39243-02-2
	Pyclazolam	8.2 ^{†}	8-chloro-6-(pyridin-2-yl)-1-methyl-4H-benzo[f] [1,2,4]triazolo[4,3-a] [1,4]diazepine	20368150	
	Pynazolam	9.4 ^{†}	8-nitro-6-(pyridin-2-yl)-1-methyl-4H-benzo[f] [1,2,4]triazolo[4,3-a] [1,4]diazepine	20368157	2034366-97-5
	Pyeazolam (SH-TRI-108)	7.9 ^{†}	8-ethynyl-6-(pyridin-2-yl)-1-methyl-4H-benzo[f] [1,2,4]triazolo[4,3-a] [1,4]diazepine	71811108	1349115-59-8
	Adinazolam	6.8697 / 135nM	8-chloro-6-phenyl-1-(N,N-dimethylaminomethyl)-4H-benzo[f] [1,2,4]triazolo[4,3-a] [1,4]diazepine	37632	37115-32-5
	U-42352		8-chloro-6-phenyl-1-(N-methylaminomethyl)-4H-benzo[f] [1,2,4]triazolo[4,3-a] [1,4]diazepine	119094	37115-33-6
	Fluadinazolam	7.1 ^{†}	8-chloro-6-(2-fluorophenyl)-1-(N,N-dimethylaminomethyl)-4H-benzo[f] [1,2,4]triazolo[4,3-a] [1,4]diazepine	21537253	37391-59-6
	U-43465 F	7.9431	8-chloro-1-[2-(dimethylamino) ethyl]-6-phenyl-4H-s-triazolo[4,3-a][1,4]benzodiazepine	134388	83983-74-8
	Ro11-5073	8.4815 / 3.3nM	(4S)-8-chloro-6-(2-fluorophenyl)-1,4-dimethyl-4H-benzo[f] [1,2,4]triazolo[4,3-a] [1,4]diazepine	101637147	
	Ro11-6679	8.3979 / 4nM	8-nitro-6-(2-fluorophenyl)-1,4-dimethyl-4H-benzo[f] [1,2,4]triazolo[4,3-a] [1,4]diazepine		
	Ro17-4582	8.4559 / 3.5nM	4-(2-chlorophenyl)-9-methyl-6H-thieno[3,2-f] [1,2,4]triazolo[4,3-a] [1,4]diazepine		
	Etizolam	8.5086 / 3.1nM	2-ethyl-4-(2-chlorophenyl)-9-methyl-6H-thieno[3,2-f] [1,2,4]triazolo[4,3-a] [1,4]diazepine	3307	40054-69-1
	Deschloroetizolam	8.5 ^{†}	2-ethyl-4-phenyl-9-methyl-6H-thieno[3,2-f] [1,2,4]triazolo[4,3-a] [1,4]diazepine	827322	40054-73-7
	Desmethyletizolam		2-ethyl-4-(2-chlorophenyl)-6H-thieno[3,2-f] [1,2,4]triazolo[4,3-a] [1,4]diazepine	12434325	40054-68-0
	Fluetizolam	8.8 ^{†}	2-ethyl-4-(2-fluorophenyl)-9-methyl-6H-thieno[3,2-f] [1,2,4]triazolo[4,3-a] [1,4]diazepine	12434320	40054-88-4
	Fluiprotizolam		2-(propan-2-yl)-4-(2-fluorophenyl)-9-methyl-6H-thieno[3,2-f] [1,2,4]triazolo[4,3-a] [1,4]diazepine		
	Flucyprotizolam		2-cyclopropyl-4-(2-fluorophenyl)-9-methyl-6H-thieno[3,2-f] [1,2,4]triazolo[4,3-a] [1,4]diazepine		
	Nitizolam		2-nitro-4-(2-chlorophenyl)-9-methyl-6H-thieno[3,2-f] [1,2,4]triazolo[4,3-a] [1,4]diazepine	70600959	
	Iprotizolam		2-isopropyl-4-(2-chlorophenyl)-9-methyl-6H-thieno[3,2-f] [1,2,4]triazolo[4,3-a] [1,4]diazepine	67727941	
	Clotizolam (Ro11-1465)	8.8539 / 1.4nM	2-chloro-4-(2-chlorophenyl)-9-methyl-4H-thieno[3,2-f] [1,2,4]triazolo[4,3-a] [1,4]diazepine	3041455	54123-06-7
	Deschloroclotizolam		2-chloro-4-phenyl-9-methyl-4H-thieno[3,2-f] [1,2,4]triazolo[4,3-a] [1,4]diazepine	157010678	1629324-97-5
	Fluclotizolam	9.1 ^{†}	2-chloro-4-(2-fluorophenyl)-9-methyl-4H-thieno[3,2-f] [1,2,4]triazolo[4,3-a] [1,4]diazepine	21317700	54123-15-8
	Difluclotizolam		2-chloro-4-(2,6-difluorophenyl)-9-methyl-4H-thieno[3,2-f] [1,2,4]triazolo[4,3-a] [1,4]diazepine	21317683	
	Brotizolam	8.9208	2-bromo-4-(2-chlorophenyl)-9-methyl-6H-thieno[3,2-f] [1,2,4]triazolo[4,3-a] [1,4]diazepine	2451	57801-81-7
	Flubrotizolam (LS-152,574)	9.6 ^{†}	2-bromo-4-(2-fluorophenyl)-9-methyl-6H-thieno[3,2-f] [1,2,4]triazolo[4,3-a] [1,4]diazepine	3044878	57801-95-3
	Ro14-1636	8.8239	2-iodo-4-(2-chlorophenyl)-9-methyl-6H-thieno[3,2-f] [1,2,4]triazolo[4,3-a] [1,4]diazepine	14851924	
	Ciclotizolam	8.0 ^{†}	2-bromo-4-(2-chlorophenyl)-9-cyclohexyl-6H-thieno[3,2-f] [1,2,4]triazolo[4,3-a] [1,4]diazepine	71949	58765-21-2
	Ro11-7800	8.5376 / 2.9nM	(2-chloro-4-(2-chlorophenyl)-6H-thieno[3,2-f] [1,2,4]triazolo[4,3-a] [1,4]diazepin-9-yl)methanamine		
	Zapizolam	8.8 ^{†}	8-chloro-6-(2-chlorophenyl)-4H-pyrido[2,3-f] [1,2,4]triazolo[4,3-a] [1,4]diazepine	68832	64098-32-4
	Rilmazolam (LS-188,599)	7.3 ^{†}	8-chloro-6-(2-chlorophenyl)-N,N-dimethyl-4H-1,2,4-triazolo[1,5-a] [1,4]benzodiazepine-2-carboxamide	148494	50330-59-1
	Midazolam	8.3188 / 4.8nM	8-chloro-6-(2-fluorophenyl)-1-methyl-4H-imidazo[1,5-a] [1,4]benzodiazepine	4192	59467-70-8
	alpha-Hydroxymidazolam	8.3468 / 4.5nM	8-chloro-6-(2-fluorophenyl)-1-hydroxymethyl-4H-imidazo[1,5-a] [1,4]benzodiazepine	107917	59468-90-5
	Ro22-0284		8-chloro-6-(2-fluorophenyl)-1-hydroxymethyl-4-hydroxy-4H-imidazo[1,5-a] [1,4]benzodiazepine	10316307	64740-68-7
	Climazolam	8.1 ^{†}	8-chloro-6-(2-chlorophenyl)-1-methyl-4H-imidazo[1,5-a] [1,4]benzodiazepine	68790	59467-77-5
	Remimazolam	8.3 ^{†}	methyl 3-[(4S)-8-bromo-1-methyl-6-(pyridin-2-yl)-4H-imidazo[1,2-a] [1,4]benzodiazepin-4-yl]propanoate	9824461	308242-62-8
	Ro15-8670	7.8239 / 15nM	ethyl 8-chloro-6-phenyl-4H-benzo[f]imidazo[1,5-a] [1,4]diazepine-3-carboxylate	14907889	
	JYI-32		ethyl 8-bromo-6-(2-fluorophenyl)-4H-benzo[f]imidazo[1,5-a] [1,4]diazepine-3-carboxylate	21930922	
	JY-XHE-057		ethyl 8-ethynyl-6-(2-fluorophenyl)-4H-benzo[f]imidazo[1,5-a] [1,4]diazepine-3-carboxylate	21065283	
	Ro16-0529	7.8539 / 14nM	tert-butyl 7-chloro-6-phenyl-4H-benzo[f]imidazo[1,5-a] [1,4]diazepine-3-carboxylate		
	Ro21-5205	8.1308 / 7.4nM	methyl 8-chloro-6-(2-fluorophenyl)-4H-benzo[f]imidazo[1,5-a] [1,4]diazepine-3-carboxylate	12801973	
	SH-053-R-CH3-2'F	7.9 ^{†}	ethyl (4R)-8-ethynyl-6-(2-fluorophenyl)-4-methyl-4H-benzo[f]imidazo[1,5-a] [1,4]diazepine-3-carboxylate	11574585	872874-14-1
	HZ-166		ethyl 8-ethynyl-6-(pyridin-2-yl)-4H-benzo[f]imidazo[1,5-a] [1,4]diazepine-3-carboxylate	10309028	612527-56-7
	MP-III-022	9.1 ^{†}	(4R)-8-ethynyl-6-(2-fluorophenyl)-N,4-dimethyl-4H-benzo[f]imidazo[1,5-a] [1,4]diazepine-3-carboxamide	130439777	
	GL-II-73		(4R)-8-ethynyl-6-(2-fluorophenyl)-N,N,4-trimethyl-4H-benzo[f]imidazo[1,5-a] [1,4]diazepine-3-carboxamide	130439778	
	YT-III-31		8-ethynyl-6-phenyl-N-methyl-4H-benzo[f]imidazo[1,5-a] [1,4]diazepine-3-carboxamide	49848318	
	Ro22-1892	7.9208 / 12nM	8-chloro-6-(2-fluorophenyl)-3-(isopropoxycarbonyl)-4H-benzo[f]imidazo[1,5-a] [1,4]diazepine 5-oxide		
	Ro22-0992	7.8861 / 13nM	8-chloro-6-(2-chlorophenyl)-4H-benzo[f]imidazo[1,5-a] [1,4]diazepine-3-carboxylic acid		
	Ro21-8137	8.4559 / 3.5nM	8-chloro-6-(2-fluorophenyl)-4H-benzo[f]imidazo[1,5-a] [1,4]diazepine-3-carboxamide		
	Ro21-8384	8.4202	8-chloro-6-(2-chlorophenyl)-4H-benzo[f]imidazo[1,5-a] [1,4]diazepine-3-carboxamide	162997	63176-94-3
	Imidazenil	8.8 ^{†}	8-fluoro-6-(2-bromophenyl)-4H-benzo[f]imidazo[1,5-a] [1,4]diazepine-3-carboxamide	119194	151271-08-8
	Ro23-0364		6-(2-chlorophenyl)-4H-benzo[f]imidazo[1,5-a] [1,4]diazepine-3-carboxamide	194998	113066-25-4
	Ro21-8482	7.585 / 26nM	8-chloro-6-(2-chlorophenyl)-1-[(dimethylamino)methyl]-4H-benzo[f]imidazo[1,5-a] [1,4]diazepine-3-carboxamide		
	Loprazolam	8.2007	(2Z)-6-(2-chlorophenyl)-2-[(4-methyl-1-piperazinyl)methylene]-8-nitro-2,4-dihydro-1H-imidazo[1,2-a] [1,4]benzodiazepin-1-one	3033860	61197-73-7
	Fluloprazolam	8.0 ^{†}	(2Z)-6-(2-fluorophenyl)-2-[(4-methyl-1-piperazinyl)methylene]-8-nitro-2,4-dihydro-1H-imidazo[1,2-a] [1,4]benzodiazepin-1-one	12371485	
	PS-I-35		(2Z)-6-phenyl-2-[(4-methyl-1-piperazinyl)methylene]-8-bromo-2,4-dihydro-1H-imidazo[1,2-a] [1,4]benzodiazepin-1-one	72660859	
	Ro14-1359	7.1549 / 70nM	7-chloro-5-(2-fluorophenyl)-1H-benzo[b]azepin-2(3H)-one		
	Ro15-8867	7.6021 / 25nM	7-nitro-5-(2-chlorophenyl)-1H-benzo[b]azepin-2(3H)-one		
	Ro14-7187	6.3872 / 410nM	1-methyl-6-phenyl-4H-benzo[f] [1,2,4]triazolo[4,3-a]azepine	85687871	
	Ro13-9868	7.3768 / 42nM	8-chloro-1-methyl-6-phenyl-4H-benzo[f] [1,2,4]triazolo[4,3-a]azepine		
	Ro14-5921	7.7212 / 19nM	8-chloro-6-(2-fluorophenyl)-4H-benzo[f] [1,2,4]triazolo[4,3-a]azepine	20449965	
	Ro14-0304	8.1871 / 6.5nM	8-chloro-6-(2-fluorophenyl)-1-methyl-4H-benzo[f] [1,2,4]triazolo[4,3-a]azepine	20449964	
	Ro14-2652	8.2518 / 5.6nM	(8-chloro-6-(2-fluorophenyl)-4H-benzo[f] [1,2,4]triazolo[4,3-a]azepin-1-yl)methanamine		
	Ro15-9270	8.301 / 5nM	6-(2-chlorophenyl)-1-methyl-8-nitro-4H-benzo[f] [1,2,4]triazolo[4,3-a]azepine	20450010	
	Ro14-0609	7.6126 / 24.4nM	8-chloro-6-(2-fluorophenyl)-5,6-dihydro-4H-benzo[f] [1,2,4]triazolo[4,3-a]azepine		
	Ro15-2201	8.8239 / 1.5nM	methyl 6-phenyl-4H-benzo[f]imidazo[1,5-a]azepine-3-carboxylate		
	Ro15-0791	8.6021 / 2.5nM	ethyl 6-phenyl-4H-benzo[f]imidazo[1,5-a]azepine-3-carboxylate		
	Ro15-2200	8.3768 / 4.2nM	ethyl 6-(2-fluorophenyl)-4H-benzo[f]imidazo[1,5-a]azepine-3-carboxylate		
	Ro14-3929	7.7959 / 16nM	ethyl 8-chloro-6-(2-fluorophenyl)-4H-benzo[f]imidazo[1,5-a]azepine-3-carboxylate		
	Ro14-3930	7.8239 / 15nM	8-chloro-6-(2-fluorophenyl)-4H-benzo[f]imidazo[1,5-a]azepine-3-carboxamide		
	Ro14-5568	6.6383 / 230nM	8-chloro-6-(2-fluorophenyl)-4H-benzo[f]imidazo[1,5-a]azepine		
	Ro22-1274	7.1249 / 75nM	8-chloro-1-(2-fluorophenyl)-3H-benzo[c]azepine	13271760	89376-31-8
	Ro22-1251	7.9586 / 11nM	9-chloro-2-methyl-7-phenyl-5H-benzo[c]pyrimido[4,5-e]azepine		
	Ro22-1366	8.3979 / 4nM	9-chloro-7-(2-fluorophenyl)-2-methyl-5H-benzo[c]pyrimido[4,5-e]azepine		
	Ro22-2038	8.5528 / 2.8nM	9-chloro-7-(2-fluorophenyl)-5H-benzo[c]pyrimido[4,5-e]azepin-2-amine		
	Ro22-3245	8.5528 / 2.8nM	9-chloro-7-(2-chlorophenyl)-5H-benzo[c]pyrimido[4,5-e]azepine		
	Ro22-3148	6.3768 / 420nM	6-phenyl-2,4-dihydrobenzo[c] [1,2,3]triazolo[4,5-e]azepine		
	Ro22-3147	8.284 / 5.2nM	6-(2-chlorophenyl)-2,4-dihydrobenzo[c] [1,2,3]triazolo[4,5-e]azepine		
	Ro22-0780	7.9586 / 11nM	8-chloro-6-phenyl-2,4-dihydrobenzo[c] [1,2,3]triazolo[4,5-e]azepine		
	Ro22-2466	8.7212 / 1.9nM	8-chloro-6-(2-fluorophenyl)-2,4-dihydrobenzo[c] [1,2,3]triazolo[4,5-e]azepine		
	Ro22-2468	8.6021			
	Ro22-8515		8-chloro-6-(2-chlorophenyl)-1,4-dihydropyrrolo[3,4-d] [2]benzazepin-3(2H)-one	145981	
	Ro14-5974	8.1938 / 6.4nM	(S)-ethyl 9-oxo-11,12,13,13a-tetrahydro-9H-benzo[e]imidazo[5,1-c]pyrrolo[1,2-a] [1,4]diazepine-1-carboxylate	10041121	88552-32-3
	Ro15-4941	8.7696 / 1.7nM	(S)-ethyl 8-chloro-9-oxo-11,12,13,13a-tetrahydro-9H-benzo[e]imidazo[5,1-c]pyrrolo[1,2-a] [1,4]diazepine-1-carboxylate		
	Ro14-5975	7.2076 / 62nM	(S)-ethyl 7-chloro-9-oxo-11,12,13,13a-tetrahydro-9H-benzo[e]imidazo[5,1-c]pyrrolo[1,2-a] [1,4]diazepine-1-carboxylate		
	Ro16-3607	7.3372 / 46nM	(S)-tert-butyl 8-methoxy-9-oxo-11,12,13,13a-tetrahydro-9H-benzo[e]imidazo[5,1-c]pyrrolo[1,2-a] [1,4]diazepine-1-carboxylate		
	Ro16-6624	8 / 10nM	(S)-tert-butyl 8-ethyl-9-oxo-11,12,13,13a-tetrahydro-9H-benzo[e]imidazo[5,1-c]pyrrolo[1,2-a] [1,4]diazepine-1-carboxylate		
	Ro16-3774	8.4949 / 3.2nM	(S)-tert-butyl 8-methyl-9-oxo-11,12,13,13a-tetrahydro-9H-benzo[e]imidazo[5,1-c]pyrrolo[1,2-a] [1,4]diazepine-1-carboxylate		
	Ro16-0071	8.4949 / 3.2nM	(S)-tert-butyl 9-oxo-11,12,13,13a-tetrahydro-9H-benzo[e]imidazo[5,1-c]pyrrolo[1,2-a] [1,4]diazepine-1-carboxylate		
	Ro16-5824	8.4685 / 3.4nM	(S)-tert-butyl 8-(methylthio)-9-oxo-11,12,13,13a-tetrahydro-9H-benzo[e]imidazo[5,1-c]pyrrolo[1,2-a] [1,4]diazepine-1-carboxylate		
	Ro16-8912	8.2076 / 6.2nM	(S)-tert-butyl 8-fluoro-9-oxo-11,12,13,13a-tetrahydro-9H-benzo[e]imidazo[5,1-c]pyrrolo[1,2-a] [1,4]diazepine-1-carboxylate		
	Ro16-4261	8.1135 / 7.7nM	(S)-tert-butyl 7-fluoro-9-oxo-11,12,13,13a-tetrahydro-9H-benzo[e]imidazo[5,1-c]pyrrolo[1,2-a] [1,4]diazepine-1-carboxylate		
	Ro16-0075	8.6021			
	Ro16-6127	8.5086 / 3.1nM	(S)-tert-butyl 8-chloro-7-fluoro-9-oxo-11,12,13,13a-tetrahydro-9H-benzo[e]imidazo[5,1-c]pyrrolo[1,2-a] [1,4]diazepine-1-carboxylate		
	Ro16-3058	7.0458			
	Bretazenil	8.6576	(S)-tert-butyl 8-bromo-9-oxo-11,12,13,13a-tetrahydro-9H-imidazo[1,5-a]pyrrolo[2,1-c] [1,4]benzodiazepine-1-carboxylate	107926	84379-13-5
	EVT-201		7-chloro-3-(5-[(dimethylamino)methyl]-1,2,4-oxadiazol-3-yl)-5-methyl-4,5-dihydro-6H-imidazo[1,5-a] [1,4]benzodiazepin-6-one	9885841	308239-86-3
	FG-8205		7-chloro-5-methyl-3-(5-propan-2-yl-1,2,4-oxadiazol-3-yl)-4H-imidazo[1,5-a] [1,4]benzodiazepin-6-one	129710	122384-14-9
	L-655,708		ethyl (13aS)-7-methoxy-9-oxo-11,12,13,13a-tetrahydro-9H-imidazo[1,5-a]pyrrolo[2,1-c] [1,4]benzodiazepine-1-carboxylate	5311203	130477-52-0
	PWZ-029		8-chloro-3-(methoxymethyl)-5-methyl-4H-imidazo[1,5-a] [1,4]benzodiazepin-6-one	9971547	
	Ro48-6791		8-fluoro-5-methyl-3-(5-[(dipropylamino)methyl]-1,2,4-oxadiazol-3-yl)-4H-imidazo[1,5-a] [1,4]benzodiazepin-6-one	9953485	172407-17-9
	Ro48-8684		8-fluoro-5-methyl-3-(5-[(dipropylamino)methyl]-1,3-oxazol-2-yl)-4H-imidazo[1,5-a] [1,4]benzodiazepin-6-one	9866317	
	Ro4882224		3,10-dichloro-9H-benzo[f]imidazo[1,5-a] [1,2,4]triazolo[1,5-d] [1,4]diazepine	11673720	
	Ro4938581		3-bromo-10-(difluoromethyl)-9H-benzo[f]imidazo[1,5-a] [1,2,4]triazolo[1,5-d] [1,4]diazepine	11624499	883093-10-5
	Ro16-6605	8.6778			
	Ro16-6048	8.4815 / 3.3nM	(S)-tert-butyl 9-oxo-8-(trifluoromethyl)-11,12,13,13a-tetrahydro-9H-benzo[e]imidazo[5,1-c]pyrrolo[1,2-a] [1,4]diazepine-1-carboxylate		
	Ro16-6950	8.5528 / 2.8nM	(S)-tert-butyl 8-nitro-9-oxo-11,12,13,13a-tetrahydro-9H-benzo[e]imidazo[5,1-c]pyrrolo[1,2-a] [1,4]diazepine-1-carboxylate		
	Ro16-4019	8.8539 / 1.4nM	(S)-propyl 8-chloro-9-oxo-11,12,13,13a-tetrahydro-9H-benzo[e]imidazo[5,1-c]pyrrolo[1,2-a] [1,4]diazepine-1-carboxylate		
	Ro16-3031	8.6021 / 2.5nM	(S)-isopropyl 8-chloro-9-oxo-11,12,13,13a-tetrahydro-9H-benzo[e]imidazo[5,1-c]pyrrolo[1,2-a] [1,4]diazepine-1-carboxylate		
	Ro16-9906	8.7696 / 1.7nM	(S)-allyl 8-chloro-9-oxo-11,12,13,13a-tetrahydro-9H-benzo[e]imidazo[5,1-c]pyrrolo[1,2-a] [1,4]diazepine-1-carboxylate		
	Ro16-7081	8.585			
	Ro16-7082	8.2007 / 6.3nM	(S)-isobutyl 8-chloro-9-oxo-11,12,13,13a-tetrahydro-9H-benzo[e]imidazo[5,1-c]pyrrolo[1,2-a] [1,4]diazepine-1-carboxylate		
	Ro16-7083	8.5376 / 2.9nM	(13aS)-sec-butyl 8-chloro-9-oxo-11,12,13,13a-tetrahydro-9H-benzo[e]imidazo[5,1-c]pyrrolo[1,2-a] [1,4]diazepine-1-carboxylate		
	Ro16-9918	8.6383 / 2.3nM	(S)-cyclopropylmethyl 8-chloro-9-oxo-11,12,13,13a-tetrahydro-9H-benzo[e]imidazo[5,1-c]pyrrolo[1,2-a] [1,4]diazepine-1-carboxylate		
	Ro16-4020	8.585			
	Ro16-6654	8.3979 / 4nM	(S)-cyclohexyl 8-chloro-9-oxo-11,12,13,13a-tetrahydro-9H-benzo[e]imidazo[5,1-c]pyrrolo[1,2-a] [1,4]diazepine-1-carboxylate		
	Ro17-3206	8.4685			
	Ro17-3207	8.284			
	Ro16-4021	8.8239			
	Ro17-1302	8.2757 / 5.3nM	(S)-phenyl 8-chloro-9-oxo-11,12,13,13a-tetrahydro-9H-benzo[e]imidazo[5,1-c]pyrrolo[1,2-a] [1,4]diazepine-1-carboxylate		
	Ro15-2427	IC_{50} >1000nM	5-methyl-6-oxo-5,6-dihydro-4H-benzo[f]imidazo[1,5-a] [1,4]diazepine-3-carboxamide		
	Ro14-7437	8.5229 / 3nM	ethyl 5-methyl-6-oxo-4H-imidazo[1,5-a] [1,4]benzodiazepine-3-carboxylate	127597	83210-63-3
	Sarmazenil (Ro15-3505)	8.5686 / 2.7nM	ethyl 7-chloro-5-methyl-6-oxo-5,6-dihydro-4H-benzo[f]imidazo[1,5-a] [1,4]diazepine-3-carboxylate	71231	78771-13-8
	Ro15-1310	8.1675 / 6.8nM	ethyl 8-chloro-5-methyl-6-oxo-5,6-dihydro-4H-benzo[f]imidazo[1,5-a] [1,4]diazepine-3-carboxylate	114888	78756-33-9
	Ro15-1746	IC_{50} >1000nM	ethyl 9-chloro-5-methyl-6-oxo-5,6-dihydro-4H-benzo[f]imidazo[1,5-a] [1,4]diazepine-3-carboxylate		
	Ro15-3237	IC_{50} >1000nM	ethyl 10-chloro-5-methyl-6-oxo-5,6-dihydro-4H-benzo[f]imidazo[1,5-a] [1,4]diazepine-3-carboxylate		
	Ro15-5623	8.699			
	Flumazenil	8.6021	ethyl 8-fluoro-5-methyl-6-oxo-5,6-dihydro-4H-benzo[f]imidazo[1,5-a] [1,4]diazepine-3-carboxylate	3373	78755-81-4
	Ro15-4513		ethyl 8-azido-5-methyl-6-oxo-5,6-dihydro-4H-benzo[f]imidazo[1,5-a] [1,4]diazepine-3-carboxylate	5081	91917-65-6
	RY-031		ethyl 8-ethyl-5-methyl-6-oxo-5,6-dihydro-4H-benzo[f]imidazo[1,5-a] [1,4]diazepine-3-carboxylate	10245056	
	TG-4-29		ethyl 8-vinyl-5-methyl-6-oxo-5,6-dihydro-4H-benzo[f]imidazo[1,5-a] [1,4]diazepine-3-carboxylate	10591116	
	RY-080		ethyl 8-ethynyl-5-methyl-6-oxo-5,6-dihydro-4H-benzo[f]imidazo[1,5-a] [1,4]diazepine-3-carboxylate	5311418	
	YT-II-76		ethyl 8-cyclopropyl-5-methyl-6-oxo-5,6-dihydro-4H-benzo[f]imidazo[1,5-a] [1,4]diazepine-3-carboxylate	46214569	
	SVO-8-14		ethyl 8-allyl-5-methyl-6-oxo-5,6-dihydro-4H-benzo[f]imidazo[1,5-a] [1,4]diazepine-3-carboxylate	15316982	
	SVO-8-30		ethyl 8-(furan-2-yl)-5-methyl-6-oxo-5,6-dihydro-4H-benzo[f]imidazo[1,5-a] [1,4]diazepine-3-carboxylate	15316986	
	SVO-8-67		ethyl 8-phenyl-5-methyl-6-oxo-5,6-dihydro-4H-benzo[f]imidazo[1,5-a] [1,4]diazepine-3-carboxylate	15316984	
	TG-4-39		ethyl 8-(thiophen-2-yl)-5-methyl-6-oxo-5,6-dihydro-4H-benzo[f]imidazo[1,5-a] [1,4]diazepine-3-carboxylate	15316985	
	CD-214		cyclopropyl 8-chloro-5-methyl-6-oxo-5,6-dihydro-4H-benzo[f]imidazo[1,5-a] [1,4]diazepine-3-carboxylate	101652266	
	DM-139		t-butyl 8-(pyrrolidin-1-yl)-5-methyl-6-oxo-5,6-dihydro-4H-benzo[f]imidazo[1,5-a] [1,4]diazepine-3-carboxylate	10547937	
	DM-146		t-butyl 8-(piperidin-1-yl)-5-methyl-6-oxo-5,6-dihydro-4H-benzo[f]imidazo[1,5-a] [1,4]diazepine-3-carboxylate	10834569	
	DM-173		t-butyl 8-(dimethylamino)-5-methyl-6-oxo-5,6-dihydro-4H-benzo[f]imidazo[1,5-a] [1,4]diazepine-3-carboxylate	10808192	
	DM-215		t-butyl 8-methoxy-5-methyl-6-oxo-5,6-dihydro-4H-benzo[f]imidazo[1,5-a] [1,4]diazepine-3-carboxylate	10807310	
	Ro19-4603		t-butyl 5,6-dihydro-5-methyl-6-oxo-4H-imidazo[1,5-a]thieno[2,3-f][1,4]diazepine-3-carboxylate	127382	99632-94-7
	Iomazenil		ethyl 7-iodo-5-methyl-6-oxo-5,6-dihydro-4H-benzo[f]imidazo[1,5-a] [1,4]diazepine-3-carboxylate	10251042	127985-21-1
	Ro17-9741	8.6198 / 2.4nM	(S)-methyl 8-chloro-9-oxo-9,11,12,12a-tetrahydroazeto[1,2-a]benzo[e]imidazo[5,1-c] [1,4]diazepine-1-carboxylate		
	Ro16-0858	8.8861	ethyl 8-chloro-9-oxo-12,12a-dihydro-9H,11H-azeto[1,2-a]benzo[e]imidazo[5,1-c] [1,4]diazepine-1-carboxylate		
	Ro16-0153	8.2757	tert-butyl 8-chloro-9-oxo-12,12a-dihydro-9H,11H-azeto[2,1-c]benzo[e]imidazo[1,5-a] [1,4]diazepine-1-carboxylate		
	Ro17-1812	8.8861	(S)-cyclopropylmethyl 8-chloro-9-oxo-9,11,12,12a-tetrahydroazeto[1,2-a]benzo[e]imidazo[5,1-c] [1,4]diazepine-1-carboxylate	146197	90450-01-4
	Ro17-3211	8.62			
	Ro17-3401	9.0458			
	Ro17-3620	8.2924			
	Ro16-9351	8.4318			
	Ro16-9905	8.9208			
	Ro17-1338	9			
	Zopiclone	7.5086	6-(5-chloropyridin-2-yl)-7-oxo-6,7-dihydro-5H-pyrrolo[3,4-b]pyrazin-5-yl 4-methylpiperazine-1-carboxylate	5735	43200-80-2
	Suriclone	8.6778	[6-(7-chloro- 1,8-naphthyridin-2-yl)- 5-oxo- 3,7-dihydro- 2H-[1,4]dithiino[2,3-c]pyrrol- 7-yl]4-methylpiperazine- 1-carboxylate	40903	53813-83-5
	CL-218,872	6.9208	3-methyl-6-[3-(trifluoromethyl)phenyl]-[1,2,4]triazolo[3,4-f]pyridazine	107950	66548-69-4
	GBLD-345	9	2-(4-aminophenyl)-3-methoxy-N-[(3-methoxyphenyl)methyl]imidazo[2,1-f]pyridazin-6-amine	4602899	122479-08-7

== See also ==
- Benzodiazepine
- Benzodiazepine dependence
- Benzodiazepine withdrawal syndrome
- Nonbenzodiazepine
- List of etomidate analogues
- List of methaqualone analogues
