= C16H17N3O3 =

The molecular formula C_{16}H_{17}N_{3}O_{3} (molar mass: 299.325 g/mol, exact mass: 299.1270 u) may refer to:

- Menitrazepam
