= Meclonazepam =

Chemical compound

Clinical data
- ATC code: none

Legal status
- Legal status: CA: Schedule IV; DE: NpSG (Industrial and scientific use only); UK: Under Psychoactive Substances Act

Identifiers
- IUPAC name: (3S)-5-(2-chlorophenyl)-3-methyl-7-nitro-1,3-dihydro-1,4-benzodiazepin-2-one
- CAS Number: 58662-84-3
- PubChem CID: 3033985
- ChemSpider: 2298544
- UNII: RN43209SMA
- ChEMBL: ChEMBL351821
- CompTox Dashboard (EPA): DTXSID10207366

Chemical and physical data
- Formula: C_{16}H_{12}ClN_{3}O_{3}
- Molar mass: 329.74 g·mol^{−1}
- 3D model (JSmol): Interactive image
- SMILES: O=N(C1=CC2=C(NC([C@H](C)N=C2C3=CC=CC=C3)=O)C=C1)=O
- InChI: InChI=1S/C16H12ClN3O3/c1-9-16(21)19-14-7-6-10(20(22)23)8-12(14)15(18-9)11-4-2-3-5-13(11)17/h2-9H,1H3,(H,19,21)/t9-/m0/s1; Key:LMUVYJCAFWGNSY-VIFPVBQESA-N

Meclonazepam ((S)-3-methylclonazepam) is a benzodiazepine derivative similar in structure to clonazepam. It was first discovered by a team at Hoffmann-La Roche in the 1970s. It has sedative and anxiolytic actions like those of other benzodiazepines, and also has anti-parasitic effects against the parasitic worm Schistosoma mansoni. It is a structural isomer of N-methylclonazepam.

Meclonazepam was never used as a medicine and has instead appeared online as a designer drug.

== Pharmacology ==
Its sedative and anxiolytic abilities are attributed to the same mechanism used by other benzodiazepine drugs: modulation of the GABA_{A} receptor in the brain. This psychoactive activity makes it useful for recreational use. The sedating side effect would also make it unsuitable for routine use as an antiparasitical.

Schistosomal parasites do not have an ortholog of the GABA_{A} receptor. Instead, meclonazepam seems to cause a rapid calcium influx, leading to muscle contraction and tegument damage. In 2023, meclonazepam is shown to activate a calcium-permeable schistosome TRP (transient receptor potential), making this TRP a very likely candidate for its parasite receptor.

Some work has been done to produce two meclonazepam derivatives that show less sedation and more anti-parasite activity in mice. They seem to do this by crossing the blood-brain barrier less readily.

== Legal issues ==
=== United Kingdom ===
In the UK, meclonazepam has been classified as a Class C drug by the May 2017 amendment to The Misuse of Drugs Act 1971 along with several other designer benzodiazepine drugs.

== See also ==
- 3-Hydroxyphenazepam
- Desmethylflunitrazepam
- Nifoxipam
- Oxazepam
- Phenazepam
- SH-I-048A
