= Flutemazepam =

Chemical compound

Legal status
- Legal status: CA: Schedule IV; DE: NpSG (Industrial and scientific use only); UK: Under Psychoactive Substances Act

Identifiers
- IUPAC name: 7-chloro-5-(2-fluorophenyl)-3-hydroxy-1-methyl-3H-1,4-benzodiazepin-2-one
- CAS Number: 52391-89-6
- PubChem CID: 40344
- ChemSpider: 36859
- UNII: J8U5694BCW
- ChEMBL: ChEMBL291770
- CompTox Dashboard (EPA): DTXSID10866255
- ECHA InfoCard: 100.052.612

Chemical and physical data
- Formula: C_{16}H_{12}ClFN_{2}O_{2}
- Molar mass: 318.73 g·mol^{−1}
- 3D model (JSmol): Interactive image
- SMILES: FC1=CC=CC=C1C2=NC(C(N(C)C3=C2C=C(C=C3)Cl)=O)O
- InChI: InChI=1S/C16H12ClFN2O2/c1-20-13-7-6-9(17)8-11(13)14(19-15(21)16(20)22)10-4-2-3-5-12(10)18/h2-8,15,21H,1H3; Key:RMFYWNFETXNTIQ-UHFFFAOYSA-N

Flutemazepam was initially first synthesized in 1965, but was not further described until a team at Stabilimenti Chimici Farmaceutici Riuniti SpA in the mid-1970s. It is a short-acting (9–25 hr elimination half-life) fluorinated analogue of temazepam that has powerful hypnotic, sedative, amnesiac, anxiolytic, anticonvulsant and skeletal muscle relaxant properties. Flutemazepam has been shown to have similar pharmacological properties to temazepam, but with more powerful sedative-hypnotic and anxiolytic properties. It has been found to be effective for the treatment of the most severe states of anxiety, panic attacks and insomnia. Furthermore, it is potent with 1 mg of flutemazepam being equivalent to 10 mg of diazepam. Flutemazepam is highly effective for acute psychotic states, especially stimulant psychosis, violent behaviour, and aggression.

It was first synthesized and described in 1965 by Leo Sternbach. In a test which compared a series of 3-fluorobenzodiazepine compounds in 1976, one of which was the 3-hydroxy benzodiazepine, flutemazepam. There were nine compounds tested (all nine were 3-fluorobenzodiazepines) including, a well known compound known as N-Desalkyl-3-hydroxyflurazepam, or also called norflurazepam ). Flutemazepam was the most potent: 20x more potent than temazepam, 10x more potent than diazepam and nitrazepam, and roughly equipotent to a related 3-hydroxy benzodiazepine, lorazepam. Equipotent to another fluorinated analogue (of nitrazepam), flunitrazepam. Via oral administration, 1 mg flutemazepam is equivalent to 10 mg diazepam. Of the nine compounds, flutemazepam was the most rapid-acting compound of the series via oral administration, with noticeable sedative-hypnotic effects beginning 10-15 minutes post-ingestion. At equipotent doses, it was the most active and effective anxiolytic, myorelaxant, tranquilizer, sedative-hypnotic, and anti-convulsive agent at doses as low as 0.5–1 mg range. It had motor-impairing, amnesic, ataxia, and loss of balance as side effects (1–5%), the highest in the series.

== See also ==
- Benzodiazepine
- Nitemazepam – 7-nitro analogue of temazepam
- Temazepam
