= Nifoxipam =

Benzodiazepine designer drug

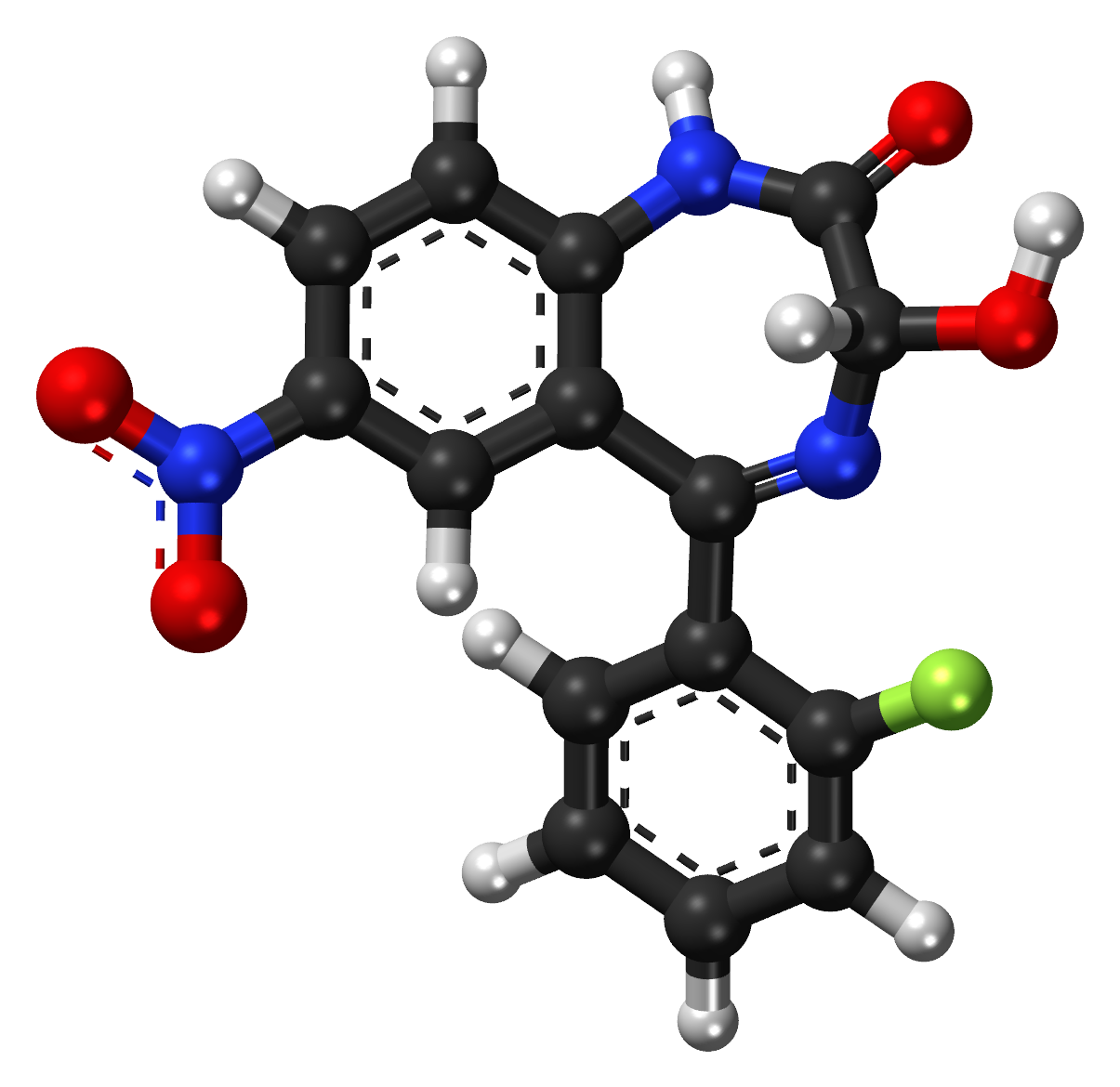

Legal status
- Legal status: AU: Unscheduled; BR: Class B1 (Psychoactive drugs); CA: Schedule IV; DE: NpSG (Industrial and scientific use only); UK: Under Psychoactive Substances Act; US: Unscheduled; UN: Unscheduled; In general legal for medical and research uses.

Identifiers
- IUPAC name: 5-(2-fluorophenyl)-3-hydroxy-7-nitro-2,3-dihydro-1H-1,4-benzodiazepin-2-one
- CAS Number: 74723-10-7
- PubChem CID: 3058221
- ChemSpider: 2319383
- UNII: 9O6C9M3CH6
- CompTox Dashboard (EPA): DTXSID80996250
- ECHA InfoCard: 100.440.630

Chemical and physical data
- Formula: C_{15}H_{10}FN_{3}O_{4}
- Molar mass: 315.260 g·mol^{−1}
- 3D model (JSmol): Interactive image
- SMILES: O=C1C(O)N=C(C2=CC=CC=C2F)C3=CC([N+]([O-])=O)=CC=C3N1
- InChI: InChI=1S/C15H10FN3O4/c16-11-4-2-1-3-9(11)13-10-7-8(19(22)23)5-6-12(10)17-14(20)15(21)18-13/h1-7,15,21H,(H,17,20); Key:UHFIFTRHLBAWGY-UHFFFAOYSA-N

Nifoxipam (3-hydroxydesmethylflunitrazepam, DP 370) is a benzodiazepine that is a minor metabolite of flunitrazepam and has been sold online as a designer drug.

Nifoxipam produces strong tranquillising and sleep-prolonging effects and has much lower toxicity compared to lormetazepam and flunitrazepam in mice.

== See also ==
- List of benzodiazepine designer drugs
- Nitrazolam
- Nitemazepam
- Phenazepam
