= Proflazepam =

Chemical compound

Identifiers
- IUPAC name: 7-chloro-1-(2,3-dihydroxypropyl)-5-(2-fluorophenyl)-3H-1,4-benzodiazepin-2-one
- CAS Number: 52829-30-8
- PubChem CID: 3050433
- ChemSpider: 2312495
- UNII: 545MN0F125
- CompTox Dashboard (EPA): DTXSID00866284

Chemical and physical data
- Formula: C_{18}H_{16}ClFN_{2}O_{3}
- Molar mass: 362.79 g·mol^{−1}
- 3D model (JSmol): Interactive image
- SMILES: C1C(=O)N(C2=C(C=C(C=C2)Cl)C(=N1)C3=CC=CC=C3F)CC(CO)O
- InChI: InChI=1S/C18H16ClFN2O3/c19-11-5-6-16-14(7-11)18(13-3-1-2-4-15(13)20)21-8-17(25)22(16)9-12(24)10-23/h1-7,12,23-24H,8-10H2; Key:RCDQRWWSKKYAJG-UHFFFAOYSA-N

Proflazepam (Ro10-3580) is a drug which is a benzodiazepine derivative.

== See also ==
- List of benzodiazepines
