= Pivoxazepam =

Chemical compound

Identifiers
- IUPAC name: (RS)-7-Chloro-2-oxo-5-phenyl-2,3-dihydro-1H-1,4-benzodiazepin-3-yl pivalate
- CAS Number: 55299-10-0
- PubChem CID: 68722
- ChemSpider: 61972
- UNII: F4ER8Z6Q3U
- ChEMBL: ChEMBL357440
- CompTox Dashboard (EPA): DTXSID10866477

Chemical and physical data
- Formula: C_{20}H_{19}ClN_{2}O_{3}
- Molar mass: 370.83 g·mol^{−1}
- 3D model (JSmol): Interactive image
- Chirality: Racemic mixture
- SMILES: Clc3cc\1c(NC(=O)C(OC(=O)C(C)(C)C)/N=C/1c2ccccc2)cc3
- InChI: InChI=1S/C20H19ClN2O3/c1-20(2,3)19(25)26-18-17(24)22-15-10-9-13(21)11-14(15)16(23-18)12-7-5-4-6-8-12/h4-11,18H,1-3H3,(H,22,24); Key:FTJLKTBLZOULCL-UHFFFAOYSA-N

Pivoxazepam is a drug which is a benzodiazepine derivative. It is the pivalate (2,2-dimethylpropanoate) ester of oxazepam. It has sedative and anxiolytic actions like those of other benzodiazepines. Compared to its parent drug, oxazepam, pivoxazepam is more rapidly absorbed and slightly more sedative.

== See also ==
- Benzodiazepine
- List of benzodiazepines
