= Sulazepam =

Chemical compound

Clinical data
- ATC code: none

Legal status
- Legal status: CA: Schedule IV

Identifiers
- IUPAC name: 7-Chloro-1-methyl-5-phenyl-1,3-dihydro- 2H-1,4-benzodiazepine-2-thione
- CAS Number: 2898-13-7
- PubChem CID: 17931
- ChemSpider: 16935
- UNII: NZ779Q5S0W
- KEGG: D05942
- CompTox Dashboard (EPA): DTXSID1046267

Chemical and physical data
- Formula: C_{16}H_{13}ClN_{2}S
- Molar mass: 300.80 g·mol^{−1}
- 3D model (JSmol): Interactive image
- SMILES: ClC1=CC=C(N(C)C(CN=C2C3=CC=CC=C3)=S)C2=C1
- InChI: InChI=1S/C16H13ClN2S/c1-19-14-8-7-12(17)9-13(14)16(18-10-15(19)20)11-5-3-2-4-6-11/h2-9H,10H2,1H3; Key:MWGWTOPCKLQYEU-UHFFFAOYSA-N

Sulazepam is a benzodiazepine derivative. It is the thioamide derivative of diazepam. It is metabolised into diazepam, desmethyldiazepam and oxydiazepam. It has sedative, muscle relaxant, hypnotic, anticonvulsant and anxiolytic properties like those of other benzodiazepines. It was never marketed.

== Synthesis ==
Sulazepam synthesis: U.S. patent 3,141,890

Treatment of diazepam with phosphorus pentasulfide produces the corresponding thionamide, sulazepam.

== See also ==
- Uldazepam
