= Bentazepam =

Chemical compound

Clinical data
- Trade names: Tiadipona (ES)
- AHFS/Drugs.com: International Drug Names
- Routes of administration: Oral (tablets)
- ATC code: N05BA24 (WHO)

Legal status
- Legal status: US: Unscheduled

Pharmacokinetic data
- Metabolism: Hepatic
- Elimination half-life: 2–4 hours
- Excretion: Renal

Identifiers
- IUPAC name: 5-phenyl-3,4,6,7,8,9-hexahydro-[1]benzothiolo[2,3-e][1,4]diazepin-2-one
- CAS Number: 29462-18-8
- PubChem CID: 34592
- ChemSpider: 11248641
- UNII: 66JKK43S1Z
- KEGG: D03083
- ChEMBL: ChEMBL1521495
- CompTox Dashboard (EPA): DTXSID40897431
- ECHA InfoCard: 100.123.659

Chemical and physical data
- Formula: C_{17}H_{16}N_{2}OS
- Molar mass: 296.39 g·mol^{−1}
- 3D model (JSmol): Interactive image
- SMILES: O=C1CN=C(C2=CC=CC=C2)C3=C(N1)SC4=C3CCCC4
- InChI: InChI=1S/C17H16N2OS/c20-14-10-18-16(11-6-2-1-3-7-11)15-12-8-4-5-9-13(12)21-17(15)19-14/h1-3,6-7H,4-5,8-10H2,(H,19,20); Key:AIZFEOPQVZBNGH-UHFFFAOYSA-N

Bentazepam (also known as Thiadipone, Tiadipona) is a thienodiazepine which is a benzodiazepine analog.

It possesses anxiolytic, anticonvulsant, sedative and skeletal muscle relaxant properties. Peak plasma rates are achieved in around 2,5 hours after oral administration. The elimination half-life is between approximately 2–4 hours. Bentazepam is effective as an anxiolytic.

A severe benzodiazepine overdose with bentazepam may result in coma and respiratory failure. Adverse effects include dry mouth, somnolence, asthenia, dyspepsia, constipation, nausea and drug-induced lymphocytic colitis has been associated with bentazepam. Severe liver damage and hepatitis has also been associated with bentazepam. Whilst liver failure from bentazepam is considered to be rare, liver function monitoring has been recommended for all patients taking bentazepam.

== See also ==
- List of benzodiazepines
