= Ro48-8684 =

Chemical compound

Identifiers
- IUPAC name: 3-(5-dipropylaminomethyloxazol-2-yl)-8-fluoro-5-methyl-5,6-dihydro-4H-imidazo[1,5-a][1,4]benzodiazepin-6-one
- CAS Number: 179634-04-9
- PubChem CID: 9866317
- ChemSpider: 8042008
- CompTox Dashboard (EPA): DTXSID101029266

Chemical and physical data
- Formula: C_{22}H_{26}FN_{5}O_{2}
- Molar mass: 411.481 g·mol^{−1}
- 3D model (JSmol): Interactive image
- SMILES: CCCN(CC1=CN=C(C2=C(CN(C(C3=C4C=CC(F)=C3)=O)C)N4C=N2)O1)CCC
- InChI: InChI=1S/C22H26FN5O2/c1-4-8-27(9-5-2)12-16-11-24-21(30-16)20-19-13-26(3)22(29)17-10-15(23)6-7-18(17)28(19)14-25-20/h6-7,10-11,14H,4-5,8-9,12-13H2,1-3H3; Key:YKKLHEHNUYCLQQ-UHFFFAOYSA-N

Ro48-8684 is a water-soluble benzodiazepine derivative developed by Hoffman-LaRoche in the 1990s, which was designed along with Ro48-6791 as an improved replacement for midazolam, but ultimately proved to have little advantages over the parent drug and has not been introduced into clinical practice.

== See also ==
- Benzodiazepine
