= Fluloprazolam =

Benzodiazepine research chemical

Clinical data
- Other names: Fluoprazolam, Floprazolam

Identifiers
- IUPAC name: (2Z)-6-(2-Fluorophenyl)-2-[(4-methylpiperazin-1-yl)methylidene]-8-nitro-4H-imidazo[1,2-a][1,4]benzodiazepin-1-one
- CAS Number: 63146-74-7
- PubChem CID: 12371485
- ChemSpider: 34243184
- ChEMBL: ChEMBL3249357

Chemical and physical data
- Formula: C_{23}H_{21}FN_{6}O_{3}
- Molar mass: 448.458 g·mol^{−1}
- 3D model (JSmol): Interactive image
- Melting point: 303–306 °C (577–583 °F)
- SMILES: CN1CCN(CC1)/C=C\2/C(=O)N3C(=N2)CN=C(C4=C3C=CC(=C4)[N+](=O)[O-])C5=CC=CC=C5F
- InChI: InChI=InChI=1S/C23H21FN6O3/c1-27-8-10-28(11-9-27)14-19-23(31)29-20-7-6-15(30(32)33)12-17(20)22(25-13-21(29)26-19)16-4-2-3-5-18(16)24/h2-7,12,14H,8-11,13H2,1H3/b19-14-; Key:JYMHWJZLSYFHJD-RGEXLXHISA-N

Fluloprazolam (also known as fluoprazolam) is a benzodiazepine derivative which has been sold online as a designer drug. It is an analog of loprazolam with the chlorine atom on the phenyl group being replaced by a fluorine atom.

== History ==
Fluloprazolam was first described in 1977 by Ager et al.

== Pharmacology ==
Fluloprazolam is expected to have similar pharmacological properties as loprazolam. Its general level of activity has been described as "very high" alongside that of loprazolam. (Note: As compared to their parent compounds, which have no halogen on the phenyl group, and have a chlorine atom instead of a nitro group on the benzene ring; IUPAC name (2Z)-6-phenyl-2-[(4-methylpiperazin-1-yl)methylidene]-8-chloro-4H-imidazo[1,2-a][1,4]benzodiazepin-1-one.) However, fluloprazolam’s dosing range and potency relative to other benzodiazepines has not been described in scientific literature.

Other pharmacological data on fluloprazolam is extremely limited. Little is known about its exact receptor targets, metabolism, and potential toxicity.

== See also ==
- Flualprazolam
- Loprazolam
- List of benzodiazepines
