= Iclazepam =

Chemical compound

Identifiers
- IUPAC name: 7-chloro-1-[2-(cyclopropylmethoxy)ethyl]-5-phenyl-3H-1,4-benzodiazepin-2-one
- CAS Number: 57916-70-8
- PubChem CID: 68777
- ChemSpider: 62020
- UNII: FL061Q6NMC
- ChEMBL: ChEMBL2104257
- CompTox Dashboard (EPA): DTXSID20206628

Chemical and physical data
- Formula: C_{21}H_{21}ClN_{2}O_{2}
- Molar mass: 368.86 g·mol^{−1}
- 3D model (JSmol): Interactive image
- SMILES: ClC1=CC2=C(C=C1)N(CCOCC3CC3)C(CN=C2C4=CC=CC=C4)=O
- InChI: InChI=1S/C21H21ClN2O2/c22-17-8-9-19-18(12-17)21(16-4-2-1-3-5-16)23-13-20(25)24(19)10-11-26-14-15-6-7-15/h1-5,8-9,12,15H,6-7,10-11,13-14H2; Key:PLRHQQPBNXIHAZ-UHFFFAOYSA-N

Iclazepam (Clazepam) is a drug which is a benzodiazepine derivative. It has sedative and anxiolytic effects similar to those produced by other benzodiazepine derivatives, and is around the same potency as chlordiazepoxide.

Iclazepam is a derivative of nordazepam substituted with a cyclopropylmethoxyethyl group on the N^{1} nitrogen. Once in the body, iclazepam is quickly metabolised to nordazepam and its N-(2-hydroxyethyl) derivative, which are thought to be mainly responsible for its effects.

== See also ==
- List of benzodiazepines
