= C17H13N5O2 =

The molecular formula C_{17}H_{13}N_{5}O_{2} (molar mass: 319.317 g/mol, exact mass: 319.1069 u) may refer to:

- Nitrazolam
- SB-334867
