= Tuclazepam =

Chemical compound

Identifiers
- IUPAC name: [2-chloro-5-(2-chlorophenyl)-1-methyl-3H-1,4-benzodiazepin-2-yl]methanol
- CAS Number: 51037-88-8
- PubChem CID: 3050405
- ChemSpider: 9899200
- UNII: 343211YULR
- ChEMBL: ChEMBL2104451
- CompTox Dashboard (EPA): DTXSID40965326 DTXSID90866177, DTXSID40965326

Chemical and physical data
- Formula: C_{17}H_{16}Cl_{2}N_{2}O
- Molar mass: 335.23 g·mol^{−1}
- 3D model (JSmol): Interactive image
- Chirality: Racemic mixture
- SMILES: CN2c1ccc(Cl)cc1C(=NCC2CO)c3ccccc3Cl
- InChI: InChI=1S/C17H16Cl2N2O/c1-21-12(10-22)9-20-17(13-4-2-3-5-15(13)19)14-8-11(18)6-7-16(14)21/h2-8,12,22H,9-10H2,1H3; Key:OOESZOOEEZGPST-UHFFFAOYSA-N

Tuclazepam is a drug which is a benzodiazepine derivative.

== See also ==
- Benzodiazepine
