= Ethyl dirazepate =

Chemical compound

Identifiers
- IUPAC name: ethyl 7-chloro-5-(2-chlorophenyl)-2-oxo-1,3-dihydro-1,4-benzodiazepine-3-carboxylate
- CAS Number: 23980-14-5
- PubChem CID: 208941
- ChemSpider: 181035
- UNII: 74FAA305EW
- ChEMBL: ChEMBL2106231
- CompTox Dashboard (EPA): DTXSID10865127

Chemical and physical data
- Formula: C_{18}H_{14}Cl_{2}N_{2}O_{3}
- Molar mass: 377.22 g·mol^{−1}
- 3D model (JSmol): Interactive image
- SMILES: CCOC(=O)C1C(=O)NC2=C(C=C(C=C2)Cl)C(=N1)C3=CC=CC=C3Cl
- InChI: InChI=1S/C18H14Cl2N2O3/c1-2-25-18(24)16-17(23)21-14-8-7-10(19)9-12(14)15(22-16)11-5-3-4-6-13(11)20/h3-9,16H,2H2,1H3,(H,21,23); Key:XFVPZJMXRNBHLQ-UHFFFAOYSA-N

Ethyl dirazepate is a drug which is a benzodiazepine derivative which was developed by Sanofi Winthrop. It has anxiolytic and hypnotic and possibly other characteristic benzodiazepine properties.

== See also ==
- Benzodiazepine
