= FG-8205 =

Chemical compound

Identifiers
- IUPAC name: 7-chloro-5-methyl-3-(5-propan-2-yl-1,2,4-oxadiazol-3-yl)-4H-imidazo[1,5-a][1,4]benzodiazepin-6-one
- CAS Number: 122384-14-9
- PubChem CID: 129710
- ChemSpider: 114837
- UNII: 7V0I080855
- ChEMBL: ChEMBL307202
- CompTox Dashboard (EPA): DTXSID40153589

Chemical and physical data
- Formula: C_{17}H_{16}ClN_{5}O_{2}
- Molar mass: 357.80 g·mol^{−1}
- 3D model (JSmol): Interactive image
- SMILES: Clc4cccc3n2cnc(c1nc(on1)C(C)C)c2CN(C(=O)c34)C
- InChI: InChI=1S/C17H16ClN5O2/c1-9(2)16-20-15(21-25-16)14-12-7-22(3)17(24)13-10(18)5-4-6-11(13)23(12)8-19-14/h4-6,8-9H,7H2,1-3H3; Key:SEWXZWMBVGJJPG-UHFFFAOYSA-N

FG-8205 (L-663,581) is an imidazobenzodiazepine derivative related to bretazenil, which acts as a partial agonist at GABA_{A} receptors, with slight selectivity for the α_{1}-containing subtype. In animal tests it has anxiolytic and anticonvulsant effects but with little sedation or ataxia produced.

== See also ==
- Benzodiazepine
