= CL-218,872 =

Chemical compound

Identifiers
- IUPAC name: 3-methyl-6-[3-(trifluoromethyl)phenyl]-[1,2,4]triazolo[3,4-f]pyridazine
- CAS Number: 66548-69-4
- PubChem CID: 107950
- ChemSpider: 97072
- UNII: O7GR5XL5B5
- ChEMBL: ChEMBL13662
- CompTox Dashboard (EPA): DTXSID80216728
- ECHA InfoCard: 100.164.099

Chemical and physical data
- Formula: C_{13}H_{9}F_{3}N_{4}
- Molar mass: 278.238 g·mol^{−1}
- InChI: InChI=1S/C13H9F3N4/c1-8-17-18-12-6-5-11(19-20(8)12)9-3-2-4-10(7-9)13(14,15)16/h2-7H,1H3; Key:GUOQUXNJZHGPQF-UHFFFAOYSA-N

CL-218,872 is a sedative and hypnotic drug used in scientific research. It has similar effects to sedative-hypnotic benzodiazepine drugs such as triazolam, but is structurally distinct and so is classed as a nonbenzodiazepine hypnotic.

CL-218,872 is a GABA_{A} partial agonist which is selective for the α1 subtype. It has a range of effects including sedative, hypnotic, anxiolytic, anticonvulsant and amnestic actions, however the most prominent actions are sedation and amnesia, and CL-218,872 produces effects very similar to those of the hypnotic imidazopyridine derivative zolpidem in animal studies.
