= Premazepam =

Chemical compound

Pharmacokinetic data
- Metabolism: Hepatic
- Elimination half-life: 10–13 hours
- Excretion: Renal

Identifiers
- IUPAC name: 6,7-Dimethyl-5-phenyl-1,3-dihydropyrrolo[3,4-e][1,4]diazepin-2-one
- CAS Number: 57435-86-6
- PubChem CID: 72104
- ChemSpider: 65088
- UNII: OI7443PDLB
- ChEMBL: ChEMBL2104741
- CompTox Dashboard (EPA): DTXSID60206026

Chemical and physical data
- Formula: C_{15}H_{15}N_{3}O
- Molar mass: 253.305 g·mol^{−1}
- 3D model (JSmol): Interactive image
- SMILES: Cc1c2c(cn1C)NC(=O)CN=C2c3ccccc3
- InChI: InChI=1S/C15H15N3O/c1-10-14-12(9-18(10)2)17-13(19)8-16-15(14)11-6-4-3-5-7-11/h3-7,9H,8H2,1-2H3,(H,17,19); Key:CNWSHOJSFGGNLC-UHFFFAOYSA-N

Premazepam is a drug in the pyrrolodiazepine class. It is a partial agonist of benzodiazepine receptors and was shown in 1984 to possess both anxiolytic and sedative properties in humans but was never marketed.

== Properties ==
The initial doses of premazepam given to human test subjects demonstrated similar psychological test results to those produced by diazepam. It was also demonstrated that initial dosing with premazepam produces similar sedative effects as compared with diazepam, although psychomotor impairments are greater with premazepam than with diazepam after initial dosing. However, with repeated dosing for more than one day premazepam causes less sedation and less psychomotor impairment than diazepam. Premazepam possesses sedative and anxiolytic properties. Premazepam produces more slow wave and less fast wave EEG changes than diazepam. Tests have shown that 7.5 mg of premazepam is approximately equivalent to 5 mg of diazepam.

== Pharmacology ==
Premazepam is a pyrrolodiazepine and acts as a partial agonist at benzodiazepine receptors. The mean time taken to reach peak plasma levels is 2 hours and the mean half life of premazepam in humans is 11.5 hours. About 90% of the drug is excreted in unchanged form. Of the remaining 10% of the drug none of the metabolites showed any pharmacological activity. Thus premazepam produces no active metabolites in humans.

== See also ==
- Benzodiazepine
- Benzodiazepine dependence
- Benzodiazepine withdrawal syndrome
- Long-term effects of benzodiazepines
