= Nitrazepate =

Chemical compound

Clinical data
- Other names: CB 4335 (potassium salt)

Identifiers
- IUPAC name: (RS)-7-nitro-2-oxo-5-phenyl-2,3-dihydro-1H-1,4-benzodiazepine-3-carboxylic acid
- CAS Number: 5571-84-6
- PubChem CID: 21741
- ChemSpider: 20436
- UNII: 3D69H48U8Q
- CompTox Dashboard (EPA): DTXSID80971082

Chemical and physical data
- Formula: C_{16}H_{11}N_{3}O_{5}
- Molar mass: 325.280 g·mol^{−1}
- 3D model (JSmol): Interactive image
- Chirality: Racemic mixture
- SMILES: [O-][N+](C1=CC2=C(C=C1)NC(C(C(O)=O)N=C2C3=CC=CC=C3)=O)=O
- InChI: InChI=1S/C16H11N3O5/c20-15-14(16(21)22)18-13(9-4-2-1-3-5-9)11-8-10(19(23)24)6-7-12(11)17-15/h1-8,14H,(H,17,20)(H,21,22); Key:JPEUYYKTUFRADV-UHFFFAOYSA-N

Nitrazepate (Lorzem) is a drug which is a benzodiazepine derivative and has anxiolytic properties. It is normally produced as its potassium salt, potassium nitrazepate.

== See also ==
- Benzodiazepine
