= Elfazepam =

Chemical compound

Clinical data
- ATC code: none

Identifiers
- IUPAC name: 7-Chloro-1-(2-ethylsulfonylethyl)-5-(2-fluorophenyl)-3H-1,4-benzodiazepin-2-one
- CAS Number: 52042-01-0
- PubChem CID: 65445
- ChemSpider: 58907
- UNII: RM53R5R2BL
- CompTox Dashboard (EPA): DTXSID00200008

Chemical and physical data
- Formula: C_{19}H_{18}ClFN_{2}O_{3}S
- Molar mass: 408.87 g·mol^{−1}
- 3D model (JSmol): Interactive image
- SMILES: O=S(CC)(CCN1C(CN=C(C2=CC=CC=C2F)C3=C1C=CC(Cl)=C3)=O)=O
- InChI: InChI=1S/C19H18ClFN2O3S/c1-2-27(25,26)10-9-23-17-8-7-13(20)11-15(17)19(22-12-18(23)24)14-5-3-4-6-16(14)21/h3-8,11H,2,9-10,12H2,1H3; Key:BSPSXMXQKZZNFP-UHFFFAOYSA-N

Elfazepam is a drug which is a benzodiazepine derivative. Presumably it has sedative and anxiolytic actions like those of other benzodiazepines.

It has been found to possess orexigenic properties in animals. The mechanism for increasing feed intake is not clear and has been subject of investigation. It has also been found that elfazepam suppresses gastric acid secretion.
