= Clazolam =

Chemical compound

Clinical data
- ATC code: None

Identifiers
- IUPAC name: 2-chloro-5-methyl-5,9,10,14b-tetrahydroisoquino[2,1-d][1,4]benzodiazepin-6(7H)-one
- CAS Number: 7492-29-7 10171-69-4 (HCl)
- PubChem CID: 24107
- ChemSpider: 22534
- UNII: YJ53T77095
- KEGG: D03531
- ChEMBL: ChEMBL1723823
- CompTox Dashboard (EPA): DTXSID50274072

Chemical and physical data
- Formula: C_{18}H_{17}ClN_{2}O
- Molar mass: 312.80 g·mol^{−1}
- 3D model (JSmol): Interactive image
- SMILES: Clc2ccc1N(C(=O)CN4C(c1c2)c3c(cccc3)CC4)C

Clazolam (SAH-1123), also referred to as isoquinazepon, is a drug which is a fused benzodiazepine and tetrahydroisoquinoline derivative. It was developed in the 1960s but was never marketed. It possesses anxiolytic effects and is also claimed to have antidepressant properties.

== See also ==
- Benzodiazepine
- Tetrahydroisoquinoline
