= Reclazepam =

Drug

Clinical data
- ATC code: none

Identifiers
- IUPAC name: 2-[7-chloro-5-(2-chlorophenyl)-2,3-dihydro-1,4-benzodiazepin-1-yl]-1,3-oxazol-4-one
- CAS Number: 76053-16-2
- PubChem CID: 3052777
- ChemSpider: 2314554
- UNII: YJL42911RA
- KEGG: D05710
- CompTox Dashboard (EPA): DTXSID50226955

Chemical and physical data
- Formula: C_{18}H_{13}Cl_{2}N_{3}O_{2}
- Molar mass: 374.22 g·mol^{−1}
- 3D model (JSmol): Interactive image
- SMILES: Clc1ccccc1/C4=N/CCN(C\2=N\C(=O)CO/2)c3ccc(Cl)cc34
- InChI: InChI=1S/C18H13Cl2N3O2/c19-11-5-6-15-13(9-11)17(12-3-1-2-4-14(12)20)21-7-8-23(15)18-22-16(24)10-25-18/h1-6,9H,7-8,10H2; Key:MQGIGGJUPITZSE-UHFFFAOYSA-N

Reclazepam is a drug which is a benzodiazepine derivative. It has sedative and anxiolytic effects similar to those produced by other benzodiazepine derivatives, and has a short duration of action.

== See also ==
- Benzodiazepine
