= Ethyl carfluzepate =

Chemical compound

Identifiers
- IUPAC name: Ethyl 7-chloro-5-(2-fluorophenyl)-1-(methylcarbamoyl)-2-oxo-3H-1,4-benzodiazepine-3-carboxylate
- CAS Number: 65400-85-3
- PubChem CID: 68856
- ChemSpider: 62089
- UNII: 36M73UIK01
- CompTox Dashboard (EPA): DTXSID50867140

Chemical and physical data
- Formula: C_{20}H_{17}ClFN_{3}O_{4}
- Molar mass: 417.82 g·mol^{−1}
- 3D model (JSmol): Interactive image
- SMILES: CCOC(=O)C1C(=O)N(C2=C(C=C(C=C2)Cl)C(=N1)C3=CC=CC=C3F)C(=O)NC
- InChI: InChI=1S/C20H17ClFN3O4/c1-3-29-19(27)17-18(26)25(20(28)23-2)15-9-8-11(21)10-13(15)16(24-17)12-6-4-5-7-14(12)22/h4-10,17H,3H2,1-2H3,(H,23,28); Key:PUJLIQLPZOZCOP-UHFFFAOYSA-N

Ethyl carfluzepate is a drug which is a benzodiazepine derivative. It is similar to ethyl loflazepate in chemical structure, the other difference being an absence of methylcarbamoyl group. Its properties are mainly sedative and hypnotic.
