= Desmethylflunitrazepam =

Chemical compound

Legal status
- Legal status: CA: Schedule IV; DE: NpSG (Industrial and scientific use only); UK: Under Psychoactive Substances Act

Identifiers
- IUPAC name: 5-(2-Fluorophenyl)-7-nitro-1,3-dihydro-1,4-benzodiazepin-2-one
- CAS Number: 2558-30-7
- PubChem CID: 520217
- ChemSpider: 453770
- UNII: 055XLQ0YQ6
- ChEMBL: ChEMBL87369
- CompTox Dashboard (EPA): DTXSID30180268
- ECHA InfoCard: 100.018.072

Chemical and physical data
- Formula: C_{15}H_{10}FN_{3}O_{3}
- Molar mass: 299.261 g·mol^{−1}
- 3D model (JSmol): Interactive image
- SMILES: FC1=C(C=CC=C1)C2=NCC(NC3=C2C=C(C=C3)[N+](=O)[O-])=O
- InChI: InChI=1S/C15H10FN3O3/c16-12-4-2-1-3-10(12)15-11-7-9(19(21)22)5-6-13(11)18-14(20)8-17-15/h1-7H,8H2,(H,18,20); Key:KNGIGRDYBQPXKQ-UHFFFAOYSA-N

Desmethylflunitrazepam (also known as norflunitrazepam, Ro05-4435 and fonazepam) is a benzodiazepine that is a metabolite of flunitrazepam and has been sold online as a designer drug. It has an IC_{50} value of 1.499 nM for the GABA_{A} receptor.

== See also ==
- Nitrazolam
- Phenazepam
- List of benzodiazepine designer drugs
