= Mexazolam =

Benzodiazepine

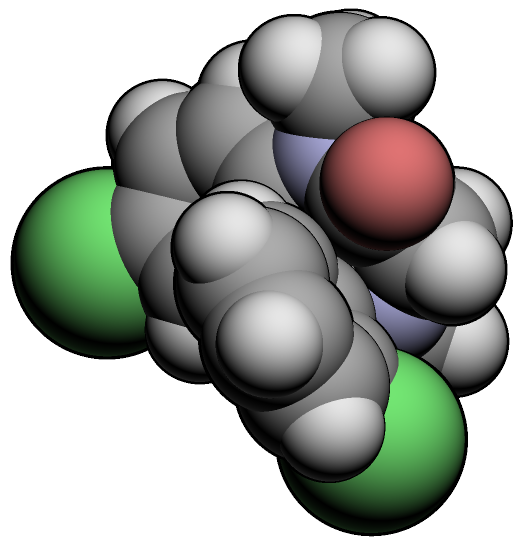

Clinical data
- Trade names: Melex, Sedoxil
- Other names: 13-chloro- 2-(2-chlorophenyl)- 5-methyl- 3-oxa- 6,9-diazatricyclo[8.4.0.0^{2,6}] tetradeca- 1(10),11,13-trien- 8-one
- AHFS/Drugs.com: International Drug Names
- Routes of administration: Oral
- ATC code: N05BA25 (WHO)

Pharmacokinetic data
- Metabolism: Liver (CYP3A4)
- Excretion: Kidney

Identifiers
- IUPAC name: 10-chloro-11b-(2-chlorophenyl)-3-methyl-2,3,5,7-tetrahydro-[1,3]oxazolo[3,2-d][1,4]benzodiazepin-6-one
- CAS Number: 31868-18-5
- PubChem CID: 4177
- ChemSpider: 4033
- UNII: S5969B6237
- KEGG: D01316
- CompTox Dashboard (EPA): DTXSID9057715

Chemical and physical data
- Formula: C_{18}H_{16}Cl_{2}N_{2}O_{2}
- Molar mass: 363.24 g·mol^{−1}
- 3D model (JSmol): Interactive image
- SMILES: Clc1ccccc1C42OCC(N2CC(=O)Nc3c4cc(Cl)cc3)C
- InChI: InChI=1S/C18H16Cl2N2O2/c1-11-10-24-18(13-4-2-3-5-15(13)20)14-8-12(19)6-7-16(14)21-17(23)9-22(11)18/h2-8,11H,9-10H2,1H3,(H,21,23); Key:ANUCDXCTICZJRH-UHFFFAOYSA-N

Mexazolam (marketed under the trade names Melex and Sedoxil) is a drug which is a benzodiazepine derivative. Mexazolam has been trialed for anxiety and was found to be effective in alleviating anxiety at one week follow-up. Mexazolam is metabolised via the CYP3A4 pathway. HMG-CoA reductase inhibitors including simvastatin, simvastatin acid, lovastatin, fluvastatin, atorvastatin and cerivastatin inhibit the metabolism of mexazolam, but not the HMG-CoA reductase inhibitor pravastatin. Its principal active metabolites are chlorodesmethyldiazepam (also known as chloronordiazepam or delorazepam, trade name Dadumir) and chloroxazepam (also known as lorazepam, trade name Ativan). Researchers have found a dose of 1.67 mg mexazolam equals 5 mg diazepam. Clinical studies suggest that 3 mg of mexazolam has a comparable effect to 1.5 mg of alprazolam.

== Pharmacokinetics ==
Mexazolam is a long-acting benzodiazepine that undergoes extensive hepatic metabolism. In humans, the parent drug is primarily oxidized by cytochrome P450 3A isoforms, yielding two active benzodiazepine metabolites: chloronordiazepam and chloroxazepam. Mexazolam follows biphasic elimination profile: the initial distribution phase has a half-life of approximately 1.4 hours, reflecting rapid tissue uptake and first-pass metabolism, following by a terminal phase with a half-life of about 76 hours. The long duration of the terminal phase driven by high plasma protein binding (over 90 percent) and gradual release from peripheral compartments. The active metabolites further extend duration of action of the drug. The elimination half-lives of the active metabolites is 130–200 h, which supports once-daily dosing but also calls for caution regarding accumulation and residual sedative effects during prolonged therapy.

== Mechanism of action ==
Mexazolam's primary target is GABA_{A} receptor, benzodiazepine site, via the active metabolite chloronordiazepam. Mexazolam potentiates GABA currents at α2/α3 (anxiolytic) subunit‑containing receptors. The drug has minimal effect on α1 (sedative) amplitude; as such, mexazolam has lower sedative load compared to classical benzodiazepines such as chlordiazepoxide.

== See also ==
- Benzodiazepine
- Delorazepam
- Lorazepam
