= Zapizolam =

Chemical compound

Clinical data
- ATC code: none

Identifiers
- IUPAC name: 8-Chloro-6-(2-chlorophenyl)-4H-pyrido[2,3-f][1,2,4]triazolo[4,3-a][1,4]diazepine
- CAS Number: 64098-32-4
- PubChem CID: 68832
- ChemSpider: 62065
- UNII: MFF90009B9
- CompTox Dashboard (EPA): DTXSID10214292
- ECHA InfoCard: 100.058.774

Chemical and physical data
- Formula: C_{15}H_{9}Cl_{2}N_{5}
- Molar mass: 330.17 g·mol^{−1}
- 3D model (JSmol): Interactive image
- SMILES: Clc4ccccc4C/3=N/Cc1nncn1c2c\3nc(Cl)cc2
- InChI: InChI=1S/C15H9Cl2N5/c16-10-4-2-1-3-9(10)14-15-11(5-6-12(17)20-15)22-8-19-21-13(22)7-18-14/h1-6,8H,7H2; Key:FOWABKOXWTZAKY-UHFFFAOYSA-N

Zapizolam is a pyridodiazepine drug, which is a benzodiazepine analog of pyridotriazolodiazepine group. It has sedative and anxiolytic effects similar to those produced by benzodiazepine derivatives, and has been sold illicitly as a designer drug.
