= Motrazepam =

Chemical compound

Identifiers
- IUPAC name: 1-(methoxymethyl)-7-nitro-5-phenyl-3H-1,4-benzodiazepin-2-one
- CAS Number: 29442-58-8
- PubChem CID: 65764
- ChemSpider: 59186
- UNII: 36YG4ZMR69
- CompTox Dashboard (EPA): DTXSID40183649

Chemical and physical data
- Formula: C_{17}H_{15}N_{3}O_{4}
- Molar mass: 325.324 g·mol^{−1}
- 3D model (JSmol): Interactive image
- SMILES: O=C1CN=C(C2=C(N1COC)C=CC(N(=O)=O)=C2)C3=CC=CC=C3
- InChI: InChI=1S/C17H15N3O4/c1-24-11-19-15-8-7-13(20(22)23)9-14(15)17(18-10-16(19)21)12-5-3-2-4-6-12/h2-9H,10-11H2,1H3; Key:CWCAUFWLFIUQHP-UHFFFAOYSA-N

Motrazepam (Ro06-9098) is a drug which is a benzodiazepine derivative.
