= Lopirazepam =

Chemical compound

Clinical data
- Pregnancy category: D
- Routes of administration: Oral
- ATC code: none

Legal status
- Legal status: US: Schedule IV

Identifiers
- IUPAC name: (RS)-7-Chloro-5-(2-chlorophenyl)-3-hydroxy-1,3-dihydro-2H-pyrido[3,2-e][1,4]diazepin-2-one
- CAS Number: 42863-81-0
- PubChem CID: 68672
- ChemSpider: 61926
- UNII: 8PDI6DY6GV
- CompTox Dashboard (EPA): DTXSID20866105
- ECHA InfoCard: 100.050.868

Chemical and physical data
- Formula: C_{14}H_{9}Cl_{2}N_{3}O_{2}
- Molar mass: 322.15 g·mol^{−1}
- 3D model (JSmol): Interactive image
- Chirality: Racemic mixture
- SMILES: ClC1=CC=CC=C1C2=NC(C(NC3=C2N=C(Cl)C=C3)=O)O

Lopirazepam (INN) is a short-acting benzodiazepine analog of the pyridodiazepine type (specifically, the pyridodiazepine analog of lorazepam) with anxiolytic and hypnotic properties. It has never been marketed.

== See also ==
- Benzodiazepine
