= Remimazolam =

Benzodiazepine sedative

Clinical data
- Trade names: Byfavo
- Other names: CNS-7056
- AHFS/Drugs.com: Monograph
- License data: US DailyMed: Remimazolam
- Routes of administration: Intravenous
- ATC code: N05CD14 (WHO)

Legal status
- Legal status: CA: Schedule IV; DE: Anlage III (Special prescription form required); UK: Under Psychoactive Substances Act; US: Schedule IV; EU: Rx-only; SE: Förteckning IV In general: ℞ (Prescription only)

Pharmacokinetic data
- Elimination half-life: 45–70 minutes

Identifiers
- IUPAC name: methyl 3-[(4S)-8-bromo-1-methyl-6-(pyridin-2-yl)-4H-imidazo[1,2-a][1,4]benzodiazepin-4-yl]propanoate
- CAS Number: 308242-62-8
- PubChem CID: 9867812
- DrugBank: DB12404
- ChemSpider: 8043503
- UNII: 7V4A8U16MB
- KEGG: D11788; as salt: D10194
- ChEMBL: ChEMBL4297526
- CompTox Dashboard (EPA): DTXSID20953024

Chemical and physical data
- Formula: C_{21}H_{19}BrN_{4}O_{2}
- Molar mass: 439.313 g·mol^{−1}
- 3D model (JSmol): Interactive image
- SMILES: COC(=O)CC[C@@H]1N=C(c2ccccn2)c2cc(Br)ccc2-n2c(C)cnc21
- InChI: InChI=1S/C21H19BrN4O2/c1-13-12-24-21-17(7-9-19(27)28-2)25-20(16-5-3-4-10-23-16)15-11-14(22)6-8-18(15)26(13)21/h3-6,8,10-12,17H,7,9H2,1-2H3/t17-/m0/s1; Key:CYHWMBVXXDIZNZ-KRWDZBQOSA-N

Remimazolam (CNS7056), sold under the brand name Byfavo, is a medication for the induction and maintenance of procedural sedation in adults for invasive diagnostic or surgical procedures lasting 30 minutes or less. It is a benzodiazepine drug, developed by PAION AG in collaboration with several regional licensees as an alternative to the short-acting imidazobenzodiazepine midazolam, for use in the induction of anesthesia and conscious sedation for minor invasive procedures.

Remimazolam was found to have both a more rapid onset and a shorter duration than midazolam, and human clinical trials showed a faster recovery time and predictable, consistent pharmacokinetics, suggesting some advantages over existing drugs for these applications.

The most common side effects for procedural sedation include low blood pressure, high blood pressure, diastolic hypertension, systolic hypertension, low blood oxygen level, and diastolic hypotension.

Remimazolam was approved for medical use in the United States in July 2020, and in the European Union in March 2021.

== Medical uses ==
Remimazolam is indicated for the induction and maintenance of procedural sedation in adults (lasting 30 minutes or less in the US).

Remimazolam is an ester-linked derivative of Pyrazolam and is rapidly broken down into an inactive metabolite (CNS7054) by tissue esterases, a mechanism shared with the ultra-short acting opioid remifentanil. When administered intravenously, remimazolam has a rapid onset of 1-2 minutes and a consistently short context-sensitive half-time, even after prolonged infusions. Unlike midazolam, remimazolam does not significantly accumulate and has no known active metabolites.

Remimazolam was approved for medical use in the United States in July 2020.

The U.S. Food and Drug Administration (FDA) approved remimazolam based on evidence from three clinical trials (Trial 1/NCT02290873, Trial 2/NCT02296892 and Trial 3/NCT02532647) in adults undergoing short procedures. Trials were conducted at 32 sites in the United States.

Trials 1 and 3 were conducted in participants undergoing colonoscopy and Trial 2 was conducted in participants undergoing bronchoscopy procedures.

In the trials, participants were randomly divided in three groups: one group received remimazolam, one group received placebo and one group received midazolam (similar, but approved drug). In the first two groups, neither participants nor investigators knew which medications were given and participants could also receive midazolam as a rescue drug when needed for sedation. In the third group, all participants received midazolam only Additionally, in all three trials participants received a medication for pain control

Trials 1 and 2 compared participants who received remimazolam to participants in the other two groups, measuring the success of sedation with the set of pre-determined criteria. Data from Trial 3 were used primarily to assess the side effects of remimazolam when multiple dosing is used.

== Society and culture ==
=== Legal status ===
On 28 January 2021, the Committee for Medicinal Products for Human Use (CHMP) of the European Medicines Agency (EMA) adopted a positive opinion, recommending the granting of a marketing authorization for the medicinal product Byfavo, intended for procedural sedation. The applicant for this medicinal product is PAION Netherlands B.V. Remimazolam (Byfavo) was approved for medical use in the European Union in March 2021.

== Research ==
Phase I and Ib dose-finding studies for procedural sedation found patients recovering faster from remimazolam than midazolam. Phase II trials comparing remimazolam to the standard anesthesia protocols for cardiac surgery and colonoscopy were presented at major conferences in October 2014.

A Phase IIa trial comparing remimazolam to midazolam for upper endoscopy was published in December 2014, finding a similar safety profile. Remimazolam was originally synthesized in the late 1990s at Glaxo Wellcome in their labs in Research Triangle Park, North Carolina.
