= Cinolazepam =

Hypnotic medication

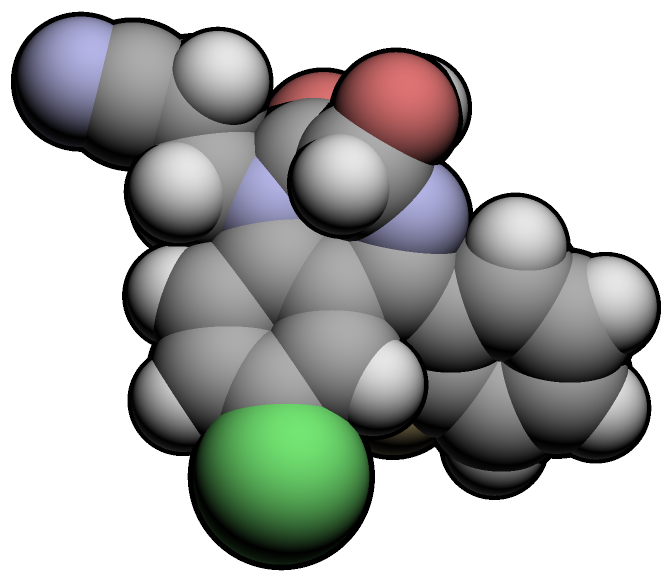

Clinical data
- Trade names: Gerodorm 40mg
- AHFS/Drugs.com: cinolazepam
- Dependence liability: High
- Addiction liability: Medium
- Routes of administration: Oral
- ATC code: N05CD13 (WHO)

Legal status
- Legal status: US: Unscheduled; EU: Prescription drug

Pharmacokinetic data
- Bioavailability: 90–100%
- Metabolism: Hepatic
- Onset of action: 30 minutes to 1 hour
- Elimination half-life: 9 hours
- Duration of action: 9 hours
- Excretion: Renal

Identifiers
- IUPAC name: (RS)-3-[9-Chloro-6-(2-fluorophenyl)-4-hydroxy-3-oxo-2,5-diazabicyclo[5.4.0]undeca-5,8,10,12-tetraen-2-yl]propanenitrile
- CAS Number: 75696-02-5
- PubChem CID: 3033621
- DrugBank: DB01594
- ChemSpider: 2298251
- UNII: 68P0556B0U
- KEGG: D07328
- ChEBI: CHEBI:59514
- ChEMBL: ChEMBL2104926
- CompTox Dashboard (EPA): DTXSID30868372

Chemical and physical data
- Formula: C_{18}H_{13}ClFN_{3}O_{2}
- Molar mass: 357.77 g·mol^{−1}
- 3D model (JSmol): Interactive image
- Chirality: Racemic mixture
- SMILES: FC1=CC=CC=C1C2=NC(C(N(CCC#N)C3=C2C=C(C=C3)Cl)=O)O
- InChI: InChI=1S/C18H13ClFN3O2/c19-11-6-7-15-13(10-11)16(12-4-1-2-5-14(12)20)22-17(24)18(25)23(15)9-3-8-21/h1-2,4-7,10,17,24H,3,9H2; Key:XAXMYHMKTCNRRZ-UHFFFAOYSA-N

Cinolazepam (marketed under the brand name Gerodorm) is a drug which is a benzodiazepine derivative. It possesses anxiolytic, anticonvulsant, sedative and skeletal muscle relaxant properties. Due to its strong sedative properties, it is primarily used as a hypnotic.

It was patented in 1978 and came into medical use in 1992. Cinolazepam is mainly used in Romania and Slovakia; it not approved for sale in the United States or Canada.
