= Menitrazepam =

Chemical compound

Identifiers
- IUPAC name: 5-(cyclohexen-1-yl)-1-methyl-7-nitro-3H-1,4-benzodiazepin-2-one
- CAS Number: 28781-64-8
- PubChem CID: 189875
- ChemSpider: 164902
- UNII: 1243654WZK
- CompTox Dashboard (EPA): DTXSID60182957

Chemical and physical data
- Formula: C_{16}H_{17}N_{3}O_{3}
- Molar mass: 299.330 g·mol^{−1}
- 3D model (JSmol): Interactive image
- SMILES: O=N(C1=CC=C2C(C(C3=CCCCC3)=NCC(N2C)=O)=C1)=O
- InChI: InChI=1S/C16H17N3O3/c1-18-14-8-7-12(19(21)22)9-13(14)16(17-10-15(18)20)11-5-3-2-4-6-11/h5,7-9H,2-4,6,10H2,1H3; Key:CMFUDRPCXZQTOM-UHFFFAOYSA-N

Menitrazepam is a drug which is a benzodiazepine derivative. It is similar in structure to tetrazepam and nimetazepam, with the 7-chloro group of tetrazepam replaced by nitro. It is a hypnotic agent used in the treatment of insomnia, and therefore has strong sedative, anticonvulsant, muscle relaxant, and anxiolytic actions like those of other hypnotic benzodiazepines. Menitrazepam is a good oral hypnotic agent, however, delay in the time for peak plasma levels to reach their maximum brings into question the benefit of menitrazepam for the treatment of insomnia when compared to other hypnotics. Typically, the sleep inducing properties of hypnotics occur within 0.5 hours. In some cases, as with temazepam and nitrazepam, strong hypnotic effects can be felt 15 to 20 minutes after oral ingestion.

== See also ==
- Tetrazepam
