= Uldazepam =

Chemical compound

Clinical data
- Other names: 7-chloro-5-(2-chlorophenyl)-N-prop-2-enoxy-3H-1,4-benzodiazepin-2-amine
- ATC code: none

Identifiers
- IUPAC name: (2Z)-7-Chloro-5-(2-chlorophenyl)-1,3-dihydro-2H-1,4-benzodiazepin-2-one O-allyloxime
- CAS Number: 28546-58-9
- PubChem CID: 34274
- ChemSpider: 31577
- UNII: VAE9C0350C
- KEGG: D06263
- CompTox Dashboard (EPA): DTXSID70182766

Chemical and physical data
- Formula: C_{18}H_{15}Cl_{2}N_{3}O
- Molar mass: 360.24 g·mol^{−1}
- 3D model (JSmol): Interactive image
- SMILES: Clc3ccccc3C/2=N/CC(=N/c1c\2cc(Cl)cc1)\NOC\C=C
- InChI: InChI=1S/C18H15Cl2N3O/c1-2-9-24-23-17-11-21-18(13-5-3-4-6-15(13)20)14-10-12(19)7-8-16(14)22-17/h2-8,10H,1,9,11H2,(H,22,23); Key:DTMPGSXFUXZBDK-UHFFFAOYSA-N

Uldazepam is a drug which is a benzodiazepine derivative. It has sedative and anxiolytic effects similar to those of other benzodiazepines.

== Synthesis ==
Thio thionamide is even more prone to amidine formation than the lactam itself.

Uldazepam synthesis: J. B. Hester, Jr., (1970); Chem. Abstr., 73: 99,001t (1970).

Reaction of thionamide (2) with O-allyl-hydroxylamine gave the oximino (3) uldazepam.

== See also ==
- Benzodiazepine
