= Ro48-6791 =

Chemical compound

Identifiers
- IUPAC name: 3-{5-[(dipropylamino)methyl]-1,2,4-oxadiazol-3-yl}-8-fluoro-5-methyl-4,5-dihydro- 6H-imidazo[1,5-a][1,4]benzodiazepin- 6-one
- CAS Number: 172407-17-9
- PubChem CID: 9953485
- ChemSpider: 8129095
- UNII: NKE9773PBB
- CompTox Dashboard (EPA): DTXSID10938143

Chemical and physical data
- Formula: C_{21}H_{25}FN_{6}O_{2}
- Molar mass: 412.469 g·mol^{−1}
- 3D model (JSmol): Interactive image
- SMILES: Fc4cc3c(n2cnc(c1nc(on1)CN(CCC)CCC)c2CN(C3=O)C)cc4
- InChI: InChI=1S/C21H25FN6O2/c1-4-8-27(9-5-2)12-18-24-20(25-30-18)19-17-11-26(3)21(29)15-10-14(22)6-7-16(15)28(17)13-23-19/h6-7,10,13H,4-5,8-9,11-12H2,1-3H3; Key:NOQIYRGMEFBZTI-UHFFFAOYSA-N

Ro48-6791 is a drug, an imidazobenzodiazepine derivative developed by Hoffman-LaRoche in the 1990s.

Ro48-6791 was developed as an alternative to the short-acting imidazobenzodiazepine midazolam, for use in induction of anaesthesia and conscious sedation for minor invasive procedures. Ro48-6791 has properties similar to those of midazolam, being water-soluble, with a fast onset and short duration of action. It is 4-6x more potent than midazolam, and slightly shorter acting, and produces similar side effects such as sedation and amnesia.

It was tested up to Phase II human trials, but while it produced less respiratory depression than propofol, it had a longer recovery time and was deemed not to have any significant advantages over the older drug. Similarly when Ro48-6791 was compared to midazolam, it had similar efficacy, higher potency and a shorter recovery time, but produced less of a synergistic effect on opioid-induced analgesia and produced more severe side effects such as dizziness after the procedure. Consequently, it was dropped from clinical development, although it is still used in scientific research.

== See also ==
- Benzodiazepine
