= Nitemazepam =

Benzodiazepine designer drug

Legal status
- Legal status: CA: Schedule IV; DE: NpSG (Industrial and scientific use only); UK: Under Psychoactive Substances Act

Identifiers
- IUPAC name: 7-nitro-3-hydroxy-5-phenyl-1-methyl-1H-benzo[e][1,4]diazepin-2(3H)-one
- CAS Number: 40762-03-6
- PubChem CID: 12362353
- ChemSpider: 64854354
- UNII: DFJ6M9363O

Chemical and physical data
- Formula: C_{16}H_{13}N_{3}O_{4}
- Molar mass: 311.297 g·mol^{−1}
- 3D model (JSmol): Interactive image
- SMILES: O=[N+](O)c1ccc2c(c1)C(=NC(O)C(=O)N2C)c3ccccc3
- InChI: InChI=1S/C16H13N3O4/c1-18-13-8-7-11(19(22)23)9-12(13)14(17-15(20)16(18)21)10-5-3-2-4-6-10/h2-9,15,20H,1H3; Key:QRWVNMAJJIQCEG-UHFFFAOYSA-N

Nitemazepam (or 3-hydroxynimetazepam) is a benzodiazepine derivative which was first synthesised in the 1970s but was never marketed. It is the 7-nitro instead of 7-chloro analogue of temazepam, and also the 3-hydroxy derivative of nimetazepam, and an active metabolite. It has in more recent years been sold as a designer drug, first being definitively identified in Europe in 2017. It is metabolized to 7-aminonitemazepam, nimetazepam, 3-hydroxynitemazepam, temazepam, and nimetazepam glucuronide.
