= Triflubazam =

Chemical compound

Identifiers
- IUPAC name: 1-methyl-5-phenyl-7-(trifluoromethyl)-1H-1,5-benzodiazepine-2,4(3H,5H)-dione
- CAS Number: 22365-40-8
- PubChem CID: 31157
- ChemSpider: 28907
- UNII: 80D8H0388T
- KEGG: D06231
- ChEMBL: ChEMBL2107285
- CompTox Dashboard (EPA): DTXSID40176899

Chemical and physical data
- Formula: C_{17}H_{13}F_{3}N_{2}O_{2}
- Molar mass: 334.298 g·mol^{−1}
- 3D model (JSmol): Interactive image
- SMILES: FC(F)(C1=CC(N(C2=CC=CC=C2)C(CC(N3C)=O)=O)=C3C=C1)F
- InChI: InChI=1S/C17H13F3N2O2/c1-21-13-8-7-11(17(18,19)20)9-14(13)22(16(24)10-15(21)23)12-5-3-2-4-6-12/h2-9H,10H2,1H3; Key:DMNPCIKBNDKNTO-UHFFFAOYSA-N

Triflubazam is a drug which is a 1,5-benzodiazepine derivative, related to clobazam. It has sedative and anxiolytic effects, with a long half-life and duration of action.

== See also ==
- Benzodiazepine
- Clobazam
- CP-1414S
- Triflunordazepam
