= Triflunordazepam =

Chemical compound

Clinical data
- ATC code: none

Legal status
- Legal status: CA: Schedule IV; DE: NpSG (Industrial and scientific use only); UK: Under Psychoactive Substances Act

Identifiers
- IUPAC name: 5-phenyl-7-(trifluoromethyl)-1,3-dihydro-1,4-benzodiazepin-2-one
- CAS Number: 2285-16-7
- PubChem CID: 16795
- ChemSpider: 15920
- UNII: 8CS486VL3D
- CompTox Dashboard (EPA): DTXSID70177394

Chemical and physical data
- Formula: C_{16}H_{11}F_{3}N_{2}O
- Molar mass: 304.272 g·mol^{−1}
- 3D model (JSmol): Interactive image
- SMILES: C1C(=O)NC2=C(C=C(C=C2)C(F)(F)F)C(=N1)C3=CC=CC=C3
- InChI: InChI=1S/C16H11F3N2O/c17-16(18,19)11-6-7-13-12(8-11)15(20-9-14(22)21-13)10-4-2-1-3-5-10/h1-8H,9H2,(H,21,22); Key:UUBMOUNXQFMBQF-UHFFFAOYSA-N

Triflunordazepam (also known as Ro5-2904) is a drug which is a benzodiazepine derivative with high GABA_{A} receptor affinity, and has anticonvulsant effects.

== See also ==
- Nordazepam
- Triflubazam
