= Lofendazam =

Chemical compound

Clinical data
- ATC code: none

Identifiers
- IUPAC name: 8-chloro-1-phenyl-1,3,4,5-tetrahydro- 2H-1,5-benzodiazepin- 2-one
- CAS Number: 29176-29-2
- PubChem CID: 71709
- ChemSpider: 64759
- UNII: V7O53S50SN
- CompTox Dashboard (EPA): DTXSID30183436
- ECHA InfoCard: 100.044.975

Chemical and physical data
- Formula: C_{15}H_{13}ClN_{2}O
- Molar mass: 272.73 g·mol^{−1}
- 3D model (JSmol): Interactive image
- SMILES: Clc3ccc1c(N(C(=O)CCN1)c2ccccc2)c3
- InChI: InChI=1S/C15H13ClN2O/c16-11-6-7-13-14(10-11)18(15(19)8-9-17-13)12-4-2-1-3-5-12/h1-7,10,17H,8-9H2; Key:IUJQOUHDFKALCY-UHFFFAOYSA-N

Lofendazam is an organic molecule which is a benzodiazepine derivative. Lofendazam is a 1,5-benzodiazepine, with the nitrogen atoms located at positions 1 and 5 of the diazepine ring; therefore, lofendazam is most closely related to other 1,5-benzodiazepines such as clobazam.

Lofendazam as a human pharmaceutical has sedative and anxiolytic effects similar to those produced by other benzodiazepine derivatives. It is an active metabolite of another benzodiazepine, arfendazam.

== See also ==
- Benzodiazepine
- Arfendazam
- Clobazam
