= Arfendazam =

Chemical compound

Clinical data
- ATC code: none

Identifiers
- IUPAC name: Ethyl 7-chloro-4-oxo-5-phenyl-2,3-dihydro-1,5-benzodiazepine-1-carboxylate
- CAS Number: 37669-57-1
- PubChem CID: 65803
- ChemSpider: 59219
- UNII: P37G7BTX8V
- ChEMBL: ChEMBL2104444
- CompTox Dashboard (EPA): DTXSID20191085
- ECHA InfoCard: 100.048.694

Chemical and physical data
- Formula: C_{18}H_{17}ClN_{2}O_{3}
- Molar mass: 344.80 g·mol^{−1}
- 3D model (JSmol): Interactive image
- SMILES: ClC1=CC2=C(C=C1)N(CCC(N2C3=CC=CC=C3)=O)C(OCC)=O
- InChI: InChI=1S/C18H17ClN2O3/c1-2-24-18(23)20-11-10-17(22)21(14-6-4-3-5-7-14)16-12-13(19)8-9-15(16)20/h3-9,12H,2,10-11H2,1H3; Key:NXJWVCHVPUCWJS-UHFFFAOYSA-N

Arfendazam (INN) is a drug which is a benzodiazepine derivative. Arfendazam is a 1,5-benzodiazepine, with the nitrogen atoms located at positions 1 and 5 of the diazepine ring, and so is most closely related to other 1,5-benzodiazepines such as clobazam.

Arfendazam has sedative and anxiolytic effects similar to those produced by other benzodiazepine derivatives, but is a partial agonist at GABA_{A} receptors, so the sedative effects are relatively mild and it produces muscle relaxant effects only at very high doses.

Arfendazam produces an active metabolite lofendazam, which is thought to be responsible for part of its effects.

== See also ==
- Benzodiazepine
