= C16H13ClN2O2 =

The molecular formula C_{16}H_{13}ClN_{2}O_{2} (molar mass: 300.74 g/mol, exact mass: 300.0666 u) may refer to:

- Clobazam
- Temazepam
