= Climazolam =

Anesthetic drug

Clinical data
- Trade names: Climasol
- AHFS/Drugs.com: International Drug Names
- ATCvet code: QN05CD90 (WHO)

Legal status
- Legal status: CA: Schedule IV

Identifiers
- IUPAC name: 8-Chloro-6-(2-chlorophenyl)-1-methyl-4H-imidazo[1,5-a][1,4]benzodiazepine
- CAS Number: 59467-77-5
- PubChem CID: 68790
- ChemSpider: 62030
- UNII: O9KZB9HG1Y
- KEGG: D07714
- ChEMBL: ChEMBL2104070
- CompTox Dashboard (EPA): DTXSID30208173

Chemical and physical data
- Formula: C_{18}H_{13}Cl_{2}N_{3}
- Molar mass: 342.22 g·mol^{−1}
- 3D model (JSmol): Interactive image
- SMILES: ClC1=CC=CC=C1C2=NCC3=CN=C(C)N3C4=C2C=C(C=C4)Cl

Climazolam (Ro21-3982) was introduced under licence as a veterinary medicine by the Swiss Pharmaceutical company Gräub under the tradename Climasol. Climazolam is a benzodiazepine, specifically an imidazobenzodiazepine derivative developed by Hoffman-LaRoche. It is similar in structure to midazolam and diclazepam and is used in veterinary medicine for anesthetizing animals.
