= CP-1414S =

Chemical compound

Clinical data
- ATC code: none

Identifiers
- IUPAC name: 1-phenyl-4-amino-8-nitro-3H-1,5-benzodiazepin-2-one
- CAS Number: 36985-40-7
- PubChem CID: 37594
- ChemSpider: 34483
- UNII: PX48L7VRQ2
- CompTox Dashboard (EPA): DTXSID50958148

Chemical and physical data
- Formula: C_{15}H_{12}N_{4}O_{3}
- Molar mass: 296.286 g·mol^{−1}
- InChI: InChI=1S/C15H12N4O3/c16-14-9-15(20)18(10-4-2-1-3-5-10)13-8-11(19(21)22)6-7-12(13)17-14/h1-8H,9H2,(H2,16,17); Key:MBSVPZTUXNRICW-UHFFFAOYSA-N

CP-1414S is an experimental drug first made by a team in Germany. It is a benzodiazepine derivative. CP-1414S is a 1,5-benzodiazepine, with the nitrogen atoms located at positions 1 and 5 of the diazepine ring, and so is most closely related to clobazam.

CP-1414S has primarily anxiolytic and anticonvulsant effects.

This compound's potency is roughly equal to that of clobazam, but with more pronounced sedation.

== See also ==
- Benzodiazepine
