= Clobazam =

Benzodiazepine medication

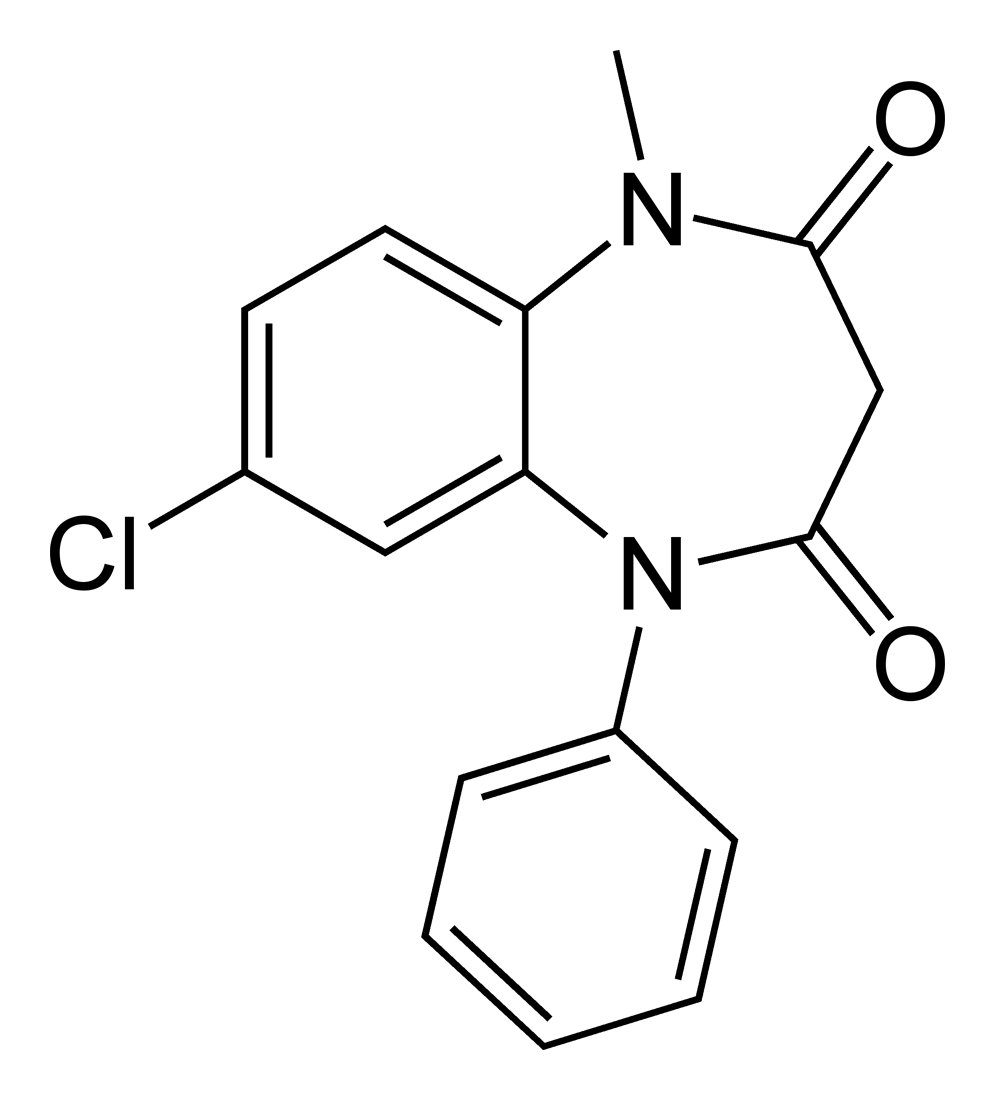

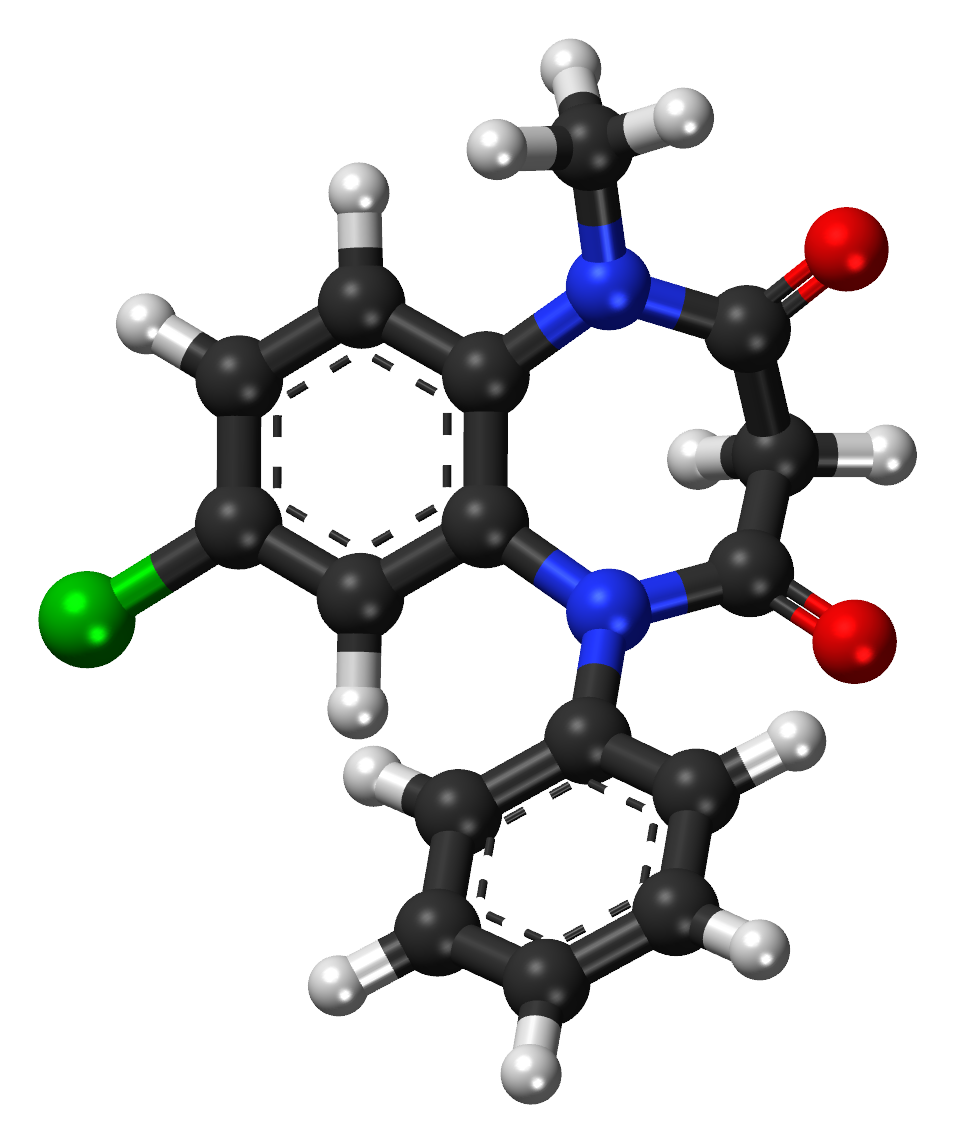

Clinical data
- Trade names: Frisium, Onfi, others
- Other names: Clobazepam
- AHFS/Drugs.com: Monograph
- MedlinePlus: a612008
- License data: US DailyMed: Clobazam
- Pregnancy category: AU: C
- Dependence liability: High
- Addiction liability: High
- Routes of administration: By mouth, sublingual
- Drug class: Benzodiazepine, Anticonvulsant
- ATC code: N05BA09 (WHO)

Legal status
- Legal status: AU: S4 (Prescription only); BR: Class B1 (Psychoactive drugs); CA: Schedule IV; DE: Prescription only (Anlage III for higher doses); NZ: Class C; UK: Class C; US: Schedule IV; UN: Psychotropic Schedule IV; SE: Förteckning IV In general: ℞ (Prescription only)

Pharmacokinetic data
- Bioavailability: Rapidly and extensively absorbed; 87%–95% (oral)
- Protein binding: 80–90%
- Metabolism: Liver
- Metabolites: • N-desmethylclobazam (Norclobazam, 4-oxo-Lofendazam); • N-desmethylclobazam-3',4'-dihydrodiol; • 9-Hydroxy-N-desmethylclobazam; • 4'-Hydroxy-N-desmethylclobazam; • 4'-Hydroxyclobazam
- Onset of action: 0.5–4 hours
- Elimination half-life: • Clobazam: 36–42 hours • N-desmethylclobazam: 71–82 hours
- Excretion: Kidney (82%); Feces (11%)

Identifiers
- IUPAC name: 7-chloro-1-methyl-5-phenyl-1,5-benzodiazepine-2,4-dione
- CAS Number: 22316-47-8
- PubChem CID: 2789
- IUPHAR/BPS: 7149
- DrugBank: DB00349
- ChemSpider: 2687
- UNII: 2MRO291B4U
- KEGG: D01253
- ChEBI: CHEBI:31413
- ChEMBL: ChEMBL70418
- CompTox Dashboard (EPA): DTXSID2046759
- ECHA InfoCard: 100.040.810

Chemical and physical data
- Formula: C_{16}H_{13}ClN_{2}O_{2}
- Molar mass: 300.74 g·mol^{−1}
- 3D model (JSmol): Interactive image
- SMILES: ClC1=CC(N(C2=CC=CC=C2)C(CC(N3C)=O)=O)=C3C=C1
- InChI: InChI=1S/C16H13ClN2O2/c1-18-13-8-7-11(17)9-14(13)19(16(21)10-15(18)20)12-5-3-2-4-6-12/h2-9H,10H2,1H3; Key:CXOXHMZGEKVPMT-UHFFFAOYSA-N

Clobazam, sold under the brand names Frisium and Onfi, among others, is a long-acting benzodiazepine medication primarily used as an anxiolytic and anticonvulsant. Clobazam is a 1,5-benzodiazepine with unique pharmacological characteristics that was patented in 1968. Clobazam was first synthesized in 1966 and first published in 1969. It was approved in Australia in 1970 and France in 1974 for short-term anxiety management. Clobazam is solely approved for use in the United States as a treatment for Lennox–Gastaut syndrome, but the drug is available in other countries as an anti-anxiety agent for the short-term treatment of persistent and debilitating forms of anxiety. It has shown a distinct profile and addictive potential compared to the more common benzodiazepines. Clobazam is the only 1,5‑benzodiazepine that has been marketed for clinical use, making it the sole representative of this structural class of benzodiazepines.

The drug has been approved by Health Canada as an add-on therapy for generalized tonic–clonic, myoclonic, and focal impaired awareness seizures.

In 2011, Lundbeck markets the drug in the United States as Onfi, an adjunctive therapy for seizures associated with Lennox–Gastaut syndrome in patients who are at least two years old.

== Medical uses ==
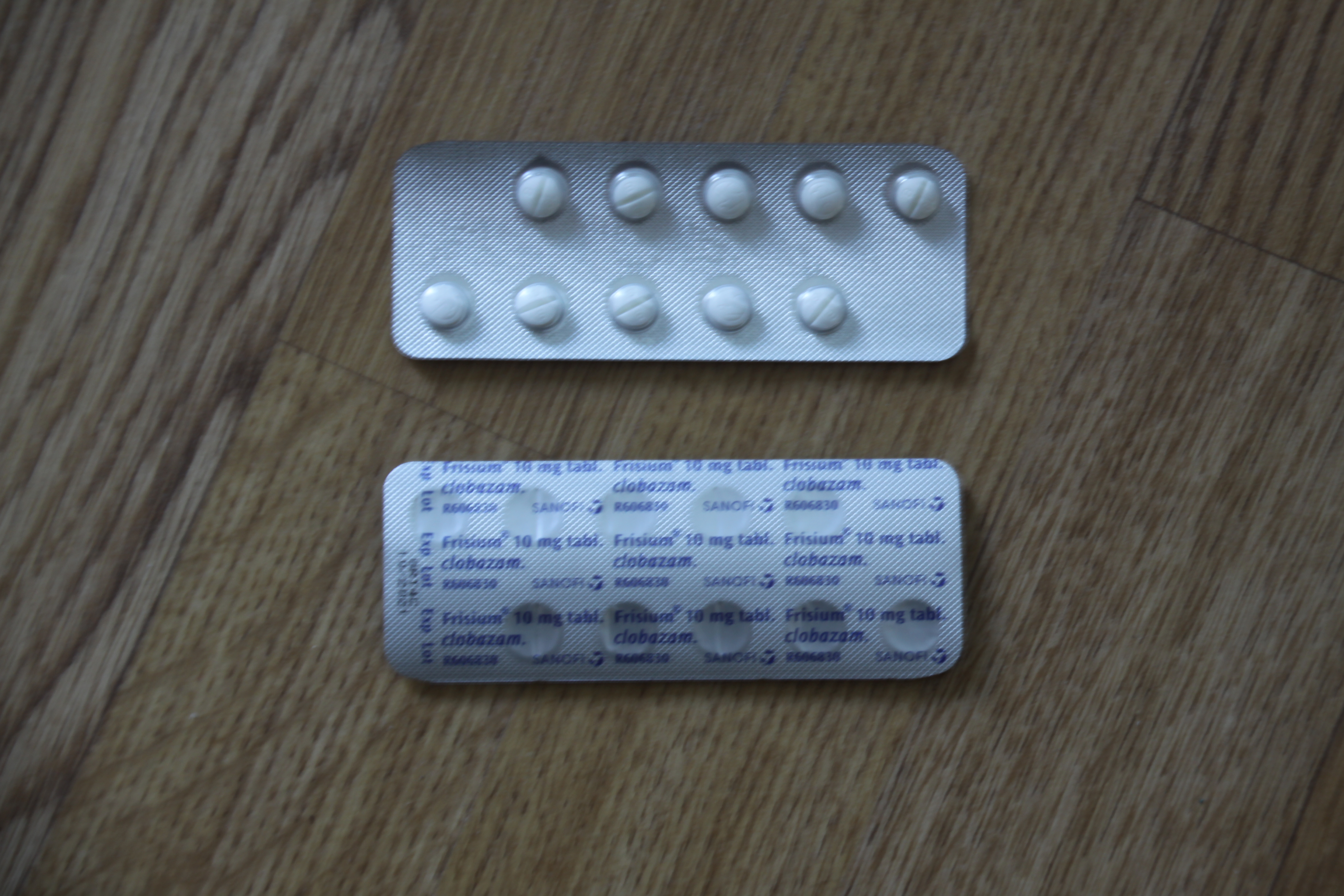
Frisium (clobazam) 10 mg tablet blister pack

Clobazam is primarily used for adjunctive therapy in severe and disabling forms of anxiety and epilepsy.

=== Epilepsy ===
As an adjunctive therapy in epilepsy, it is used in patients who have not responded to first-line drugs and in children who are refractory to first-line drugs. It is unclear if there are any benefits to clobazam over other seizure medications for children. It is not recommended for use in children between the ages of six months and three years, unless there is a compelling need.

Clobazam is approved in Canada (Frisium) for add-on use in tonic–clonic, complex partial, and myoclonic seizures. Clobazam is approved for adjunctive therapy in complex partial seizures, certain types of status epilepticus, specifically the myoclonic, myoclonic-absent, simple partial, complex partial, and tonic varieties, and non-status absence seizures.

In the United States, clobazam (Onfi) was not marketed until October 2011 and was only approved for use in combination with other medications to control epilepsy in people aged two years of age and older who have Lennox–Gastaut syndrome.

=== Anxiety ===
In the United Kingdom, in addition to epilepsy and severe anxiety, clobazam (Frisium) is approved as a short-term (2–4 weeks) adjunctive agent in schizophrenia and other psychotic disorders to manage anxiety or agitation. It is also approved for short-term (2–4 weeks) relief of acute anxiety in patients who have not responded to other drugs, with or without insomnia, and without uncontrolled clinical depression.

== Side effects ==
In September 2020, the US Food and Drug Administration (FDA) required the boxed warning be updated for all benzodiazepine medicines to describe the risks of abuse, misuse, addiction, physical dependence, and withdrawal reactions consistently across all the medicines in the class.

=== Common ===
Common side effects include sedation, drooling, constipation, headaches, trembling hands, digestive problems, low blood pressure, dry mouth, nausea, addiction, physical and psychological dependence.

=== Warnings and precautions ===
In December 2013, the FDA added warnings to the label for clobazam, that it can cause serious skin reactions, Stevens–Johnson syndrome, and toxic epidermal necrolysis, especially in the first eight weeks of treatment.

=== Dependence and withdrawal ===
In humans, tolerance to the anticonvulsant effects of clobazam may occur and withdrawal seizures may occur during abrupt or over-rapid withdrawal.

Clobazam as with other benzodiazepine drugs can lead to physical dependence, addiction, and what is known as benzodiazepine withdrawal syndrome. Withdrawal from clobazam or other benzodiazepines after regular use often leads to withdrawal symptoms which are similar to those seen during alcohol and barbiturate withdrawal. The higher the dosage and the longer the drug is taken, the greater the risk of experiencing unpleasant withdrawal symptoms. Benzodiazepine treatment should only be discontinued via a slow and gradual dose reduction regimen.

=== Overdose ===
Overdose and intoxication with benzodiazepines, including clobazam, may lead to CNS depression, associated with drowsiness, confusion, and lethargy, possibly progressing to ataxia, respiratory depression, hypotension, and coma or death. The risk of a fatal outcome is increased in cases of combined poisoning with other CNS depressants, including alcohol.

== Pharmacology ==
Structure of N-desmethylclobazam (Norclobazam, 4-oxo-Lofendazam)

Clobazam is predominantly a positive allosteric modulator at the GABA_{A} receptor to increase GABAergic transmission, particularly chloride conductance in neurons and with some speculated additional activity at sodium channels and voltage-sensitive calcium channels. Clobazam binds at a distinct binding site associated with a Cl^{−} ionophore at the GABA_{A} receptor, increasing the duration of time for which the Cl^{−} ionophore is open. The post-synaptic inhibitory effect of GABA in the thalamus is prolonged as a result.

The exact mechanism of action for clobazam, a 1,5-benzodiazepine, which has anxiolytic and anticonvulsant effects similar to those produced by other benzodiazepine derivatives. Clobazam is a potent benzodiazepine receptor partial agonist at the GABA_{A} receptor and the effects are related to binding to one or more specific GABA receptor subunits, increasing GABA-mediated inhibition. Clobazam is thought to involve the potentiation of GABAergic neurotransmission resulting from binding at the benzodiazepine site of the GABA_{A} receptor. Like other 1,5-benzodiazepines (for example, arfendazam, lofendazam, triflubazam, and CP-1414S), clobazam and the active metabolite N-desmethylclobazam have less affinity for the α_{1} subunit (sedative effects) of the GABA_{A} receptor compared to the 1,4-benzodiazepines. They have a higher affinity for the α_{2} subunit (anxiolytic effects) and γ_{2} subunit of the GABA_{A} receptor, which is essential for the anxiolytic and anticonvulsant effects of clobazam. It is generally considered less sedating and causes less tolerance than traditional 1,4-benzodiazepines, partially because it binds less to subunits that cause sedation.

N-desmethylclobazam, is the active metabolite of the benzodiazepine, clobazam. It works by enhancing GABA-activated chloride influx at GABA_{A} receptor, creating a hyperpolarizing, inhibitory postsynaptic potential. The primary active metabolite N-desmethylclobazam, circulates at higher levels than the parent drug at therapeutic dosages. Plasma concentrations of N-desmethylclobazam are approximately 3–5 times higher than those of clobazam. The primary active metabolite of clobazam, is crucial for its prolonged anti-anxiety and anti-epileptic effects, acting similarly on GABA_{A} receptors but with potentially greater importance in long-term therapy, especially for epilepsy, and is largely responsible for the drug's overall clinical action. It was also reported that these effects were inhibited by the GABA antagonist flumazenil, and that clobazam acts more efficiently in GABA-deficient brain tissue.

=== Metabolism ===
Clobazam has five major metabolites: N-desmethylclobazam, 4'-Hydroxy-N-desmethylclobazam, the former of which is activeN-desmethylclobazam-3',4'-dihydrodiol and 4'-Hydroxyclobazam The demethylation is facilitated by CYP2C19, CYP3A4, and CYP2B6 and the 4'-Hydroxyclobazam by CYP2C18 and CYP2C19. N-desmethylclobazam is further metabolized and cleared through hydroxylation by the enzyme CYP2C19. 9-Hydroxy-N-desmethylclobazam is one of the hydroxylated products of this process. While the parent drug clobazam is highly active, its primary metabolite, N-desmethylclobazam, is also pharmacologically active and possesses a significantly longer half-life (compared to clobazam's 36–42 hours). 9-Hydroxy-N-desmethylclobazam functions mostly as a pathway toward drug clearance.

The half-life is approximately 36 to 42 hours for clobazam and 71 to 82 hours for N-desmethylclobazam.

== Chemistry ==
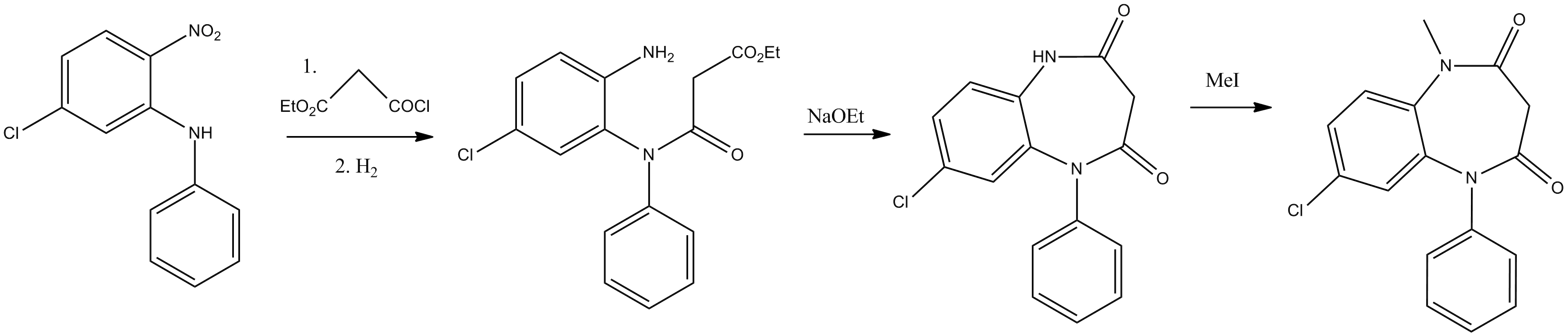
Synthesis of clobazam

Clobazam is a 1,5-benzodiazepine, meaning that its diazepine ring has nitrogen atoms at the 1 and 5 positions (instead of the usual 1 and 4).

== History ==
Clobazam was discovered at the Maestretti Research Laboratories in Milan in the year 1969. Maestretti was acquired by Roussel Uclaf which became part of Sanofi.

== Society and culture ==
=== Legal status ===
Internationally, clobazam is a federally controlled Schedule IV Psychotropic Substance with potential for abuse, addiction, and severe withdrawal if stopped abruptly.

=== Brand names ===
Name	Available forms	Available strengths	Countries
Onfi	Tablets, oral suspension	Tablet: 10 mg, 20 mg Oral suspension: 2.5 mg/mL	United States
Sympazan	Sublingual films	5 mg, 10 mg, 20 mg	United States
Frisium	Tablets	5 mg, 10 mg, 20 mg	Australia, Italy, Canada, New Zealand, United Kingdom
Urbanol	Capsules, tablets	Capsule: 5 mg Tablet: 10 mg	South Africa
Urbanyl	Tablets	5 mg, 10 mg, 20 mg	Belgium, France
Mystan	Tablets	5 mg, 10 mg, 20 mg	Japan
Clobium	Tablets, oral suspension	Tablet: 5 mg, 10 mg Oral suspension: 5 mg/mL	India
Epaclob	Oral suspension	5 mg/mL, 10 mg/mL	France, Germany, Ireland
Silocalm	Oral suspension	5 mg/mL, 10 mg/mL	Denmark, Iceland, Spain

== See also ==
- List of benzodiazepines
- Benzodiazepine dependence
- Benzodiazepine withdrawal syndrome
- Long-term effects of benzodiazepines
- Lofendazam (1,5-benzodiazepine derivative and partial benzodiazepine receptor agonist)
- Arfendazam (1,5-benzodiazepine derivative and partial benzodiazepine receptor agonist)
- Triflubazam (1,5-benzodiazepine derivative and partial benzodiazepine receptor agonist)
- CP-1414S (1,5-benzodiazepine derivative and partial benzodiazepine receptor agonist)
- Premazepam (pyrrolodiazepine derivative and partial benzodiazepine receptor agonist)
- Nordazepam (1,4-benzodiazepine derivative and partial benzodiazepine receptor agonist)
