= GABRA6 =

Protein-coding gene in humans

Identifiers
- Aliases: GABRA6, gamma-aminobutyric acid type A receptor alpha6 subunit, gamma-aminobutyric acid type A receptor subunit alpha6
- External IDs: OMIM: 137143; MGI: 95618; GeneCards: GABRA6

Gene location (Human)
Chr.	Chromosome 5 (human)
Band	5q34	Start	161,547,063 bp
Band	5q34	End	161,702,593 bp

Gene location (Mouse)
Chr.	Chromosome 11 (mouse)
Band	11 A5|11 25.03 cM	Start	42,306,437 bp
Band	11 A5|11 25.03 cM	End	42,321,072 bp
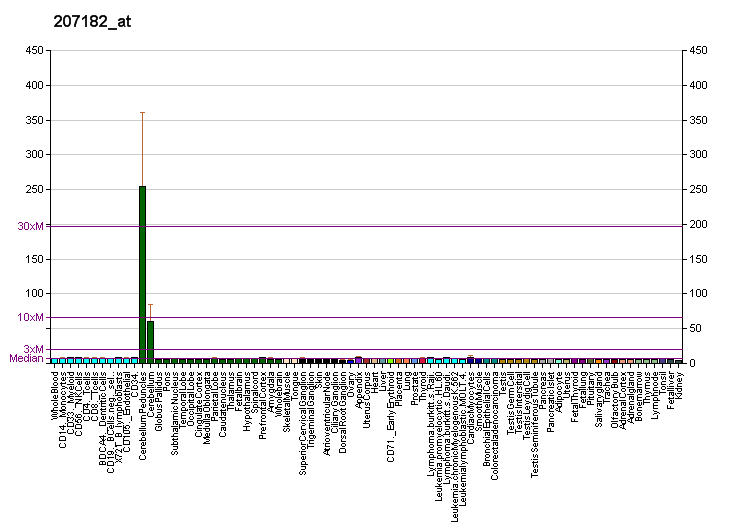
RNA expression pattern
Bgee	Human / Mouse (ortholog); Top expressed in: cerebellar vermis; cerebellar hemisphere; right hemisphere of cerebellum; paraflocculus of cerebellum; pons; testicle; prefrontal cortex; right frontal lobe; Brodmann area 9; cingulate gyrus / Top expressed in: lobe of cerebellum; cerebellar vermis; deep cerebellar nuclei; Epithelium of choroid plexus; vestibular membrane of cochlear duct; choroid plexus of fourth ventricle; inferior colliculi; muscle of thigh; medulla oblongata; cochlea; More reference expression data
BioGPS	More reference expression data
Gene ontology
Molecular function	GABA-A receptor activity; ion channel activity; benzodiazepine receptor activity; chloride channel activity; extracellular ligand-gated ion channel activity; transmembrane signaling receptor activity; inhibitory extracellular ligand-gated ion channel activity; GABA-gated chloride ion channel activity; transmitter-gated ion channel activity involved in regulation of postsynaptic membrane potential
Cellular component	integral component of membrane; GABA-A receptor complex; postsynaptic membrane; membrane; plasma membrane; synapse; integral component of plasma membrane; chloride channel complex; cell junction; dendrite membrane; neuron projection; postsynapse; cerebellar Golgi cell to granule cell synapse
Biological process	gamma-aminobutyric acid signaling pathway; chloride transmembrane transport; ion transport; chloride transport; signal transduction; ion transmembrane transport; chemical synaptic transmission; regulation of membrane potential; nervous system process; synaptic transmission, GABAergic; regulation of postsynaptic membrane potential
Sources:Amigo / QuickGO
Orthologs
Databases	NCBI: entry; OMA: entry
Species	Human	Mouse
Entrez	2559	14399
Ensembl	ENSG00000145863	ENSMUSG00000020428
UniProt	Q16445	P16305
RefSeq (mRNA)	NM_000811	NM_001099641; NM_008068; NM_001359049
RefSeq (protein)	NP_000802	NP_001093111; NP_032094; NP_001345978
Location (UCSC)	Chr 5: 161.55 – 161.7 Mb	Chr 11: 42.31 – 42.32 Mb
PubMed search
- Wikidata
View/Edit Human	View/Edit Mouse

Gamma-aminobutyric acid receptor subunit alpha-6 is a protein that in humans is encoded by the GABRA6 gene.

GABA is the major inhibitory neurotransmitter in the mammalian brain where it acts at GABA-A receptors, which are ligand-gated chloride channels. Chloride conductance of these channels can be modulated by agents such as benzodiazepines that bind to the GABA-A receptor. At least 16 distinct subunits of GABA-A receptors have been identified.

One study found a genetic variant in the gene to be associated with the personality trait neuroticism.

== See also ==
- GABA_{A} receptor
