= Clotizolam =

Chemical compound

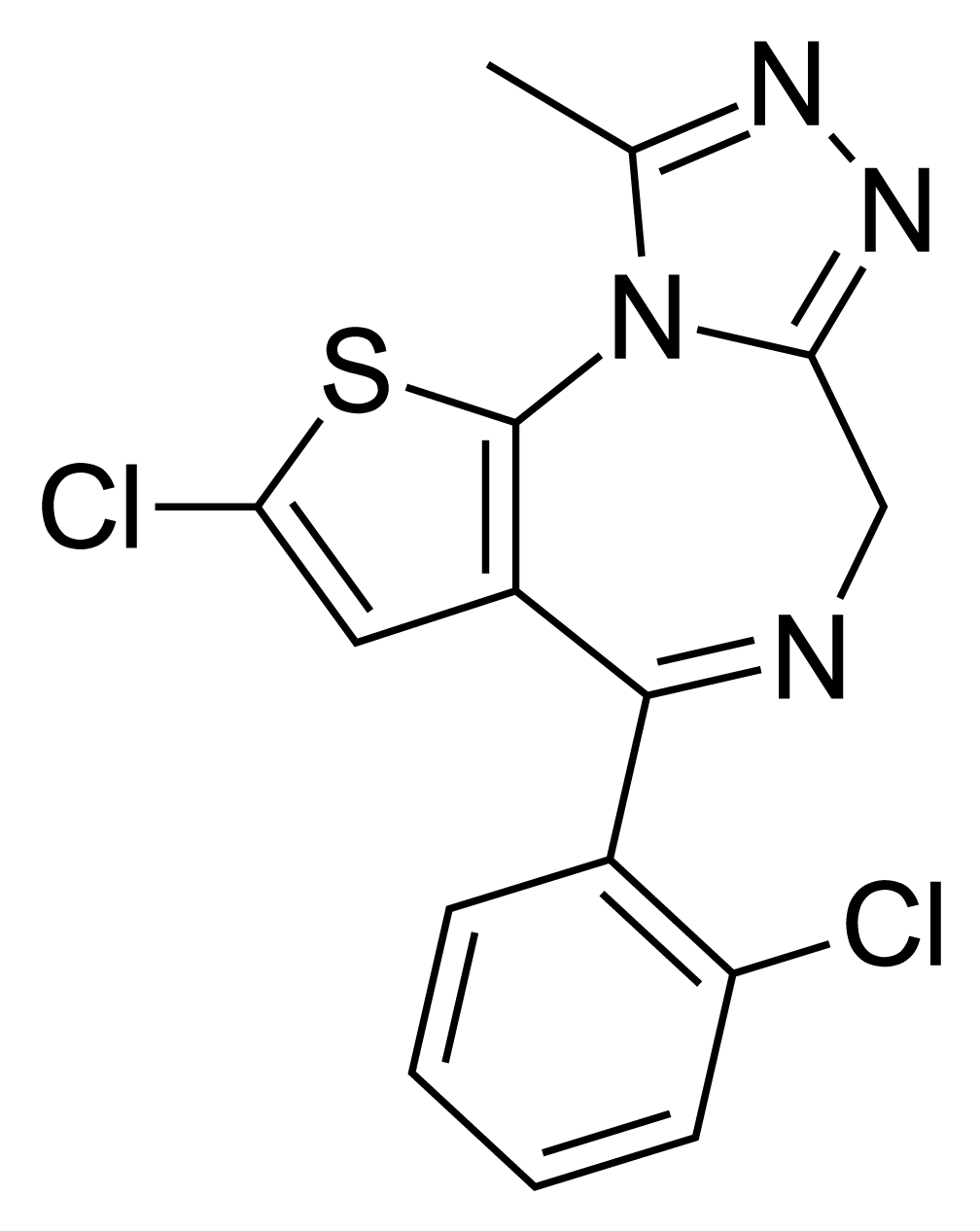

Legal status
- Legal status: CA: Schedule IV; DE: NpSG (Industrial and scientific use only); UK: Under Psychoactive Substances Act

Identifiers
- IUPAC name: 2-Chloro-4-(2-chlorophenyl)-9-methyl-6H-thieno[3,2-f][1,2,4]triazolo[4,3-a][1,4]diazepine
- CAS Number: 54123-06-7
- PubChem CID: 3041455
- ChemSpider: 2304724
- CompTox Dashboard (EPA): DTXSID50202471

Chemical and physical data
- Formula: C_{15}H_{10}Cl_{2}N_{4}S
- Molar mass: 349.23 g·mol^{−1}
- 3D model (JSmol): Interactive image
- Melting point: 205 °C (401 °F)
- SMILES: CC1=NN=C2N1C3=C(C=C(S3)Cl)C(=NC2)C4=CC=CC=C4Cl
- InChI: InChI=1S/C15H10Cl2N4S/c1-8-19-20-13-7-18-14(9-4-2-3-5-11(9)16)10-6-12(17)22-15(10)21(8)13/h2-6H,7H2,1H3; Key:CHGXYVPOFYZWRH-UHFFFAOYSA-N

Clotizolam (Ro11-1465) is a thienotriazolodiazepine derivative first invented in the 1970s, which in more recent years has been sold as a designer drug. As with other related thienotriazolodiazepines, it produces sedative, anxiolytic, anticonvulsant and muscle relaxant effects, and also acts as an inhibitor of platelet-activating factor (PAF).

== See also ==
- Brotizolam
- Etizolam
- Flubrotizolam
- Fluclotizolam
- Deschloroclotizolam
- Ro09-9212
- Triazolam
