= C5H6N2 =

The molecular formula C_{5}H_{6}N_{2} may refer to:

- Aminopyridines
  - 2-Aminopyridine
  - 3-Aminopyridine
  - 4-Aminopyridine
- Diazepines
  - 1,2-Diazepine
  - 1,3-Diazepine
  - 1,4-Diazepine
- Glutaronitrile
- Imidazole-4-acetaldehyde
- 1-Vinylimidazole
