= Α-Hydroxyetizolam =

Chemical compound

α-Hydroxyetizolam

Clinical data
- Other names: α-Hydroxyetizolam
- Dependence liability: Moderate
- Routes of administration: Oral, sublingual, rectal

Pharmacokinetic data
- Metabolism: Hepatic
- Elimination half-life: 8.2 hours
- Excretion: Kidney

Identifiers
- IUPAC name: 1-[7-(2-chlorophenyl)-13-methyl-3-thia-1,8,11,12-tetrazatricyclo[8.3.0.02,6]trideca-2(6),4,7,10,12-pentaen-4-yl]ethanol
- CAS Number: 64546-10-7
- PubChem CID: 15135972
- ChemSpider: 14539798
- UNII: AYC2I7NE1D
- CompTox Dashboard (EPA): DTXSID30983170

Chemical and physical data
- Formula: C_{17}H_{15}ClN_{4}OS
- Molar mass: 358.84 g·mol^{−1}
- 3D model (JSmol): Interactive image
- SMILES: CC1=NN=C2N1C3=C(C=C(S3)C(C)O)C(=NC2)C4=CC=CC=C4Cl
- InChI: InChI=1S/C17H15ClN4OS/c1-9(23)14-7-12-16(11-5-3-4-6-13(11)18)19-8-15-21-20-10(2)22(15)17(12)24-14/h3-7,9,23H,8H2,1-2H3; Key:YRJXUAYHZCDGDO-UHFFFAOYSA-N

α-Hydroxyetizolam is the pharmacologically active metabolite of etizolam. α-Hydroxyetizolam has a half-life of approximately 8.2 hours.

Etizolam's other non-pharmacologically active metabolite in humans is 8-hydroxyetizolam.

== See also ==
- Etizolam
- Alprazolam
- Brotizolam
- Clotiazepam
- Deschloroetizolam
- Metizolam
- Benzodiazepine dependence
- Benzodiazepine withdrawal syndrome
- Long-term effects of benzodiazepines
