= Ro09-9212 =

Designer drug with sedative and anti-anxiety effects

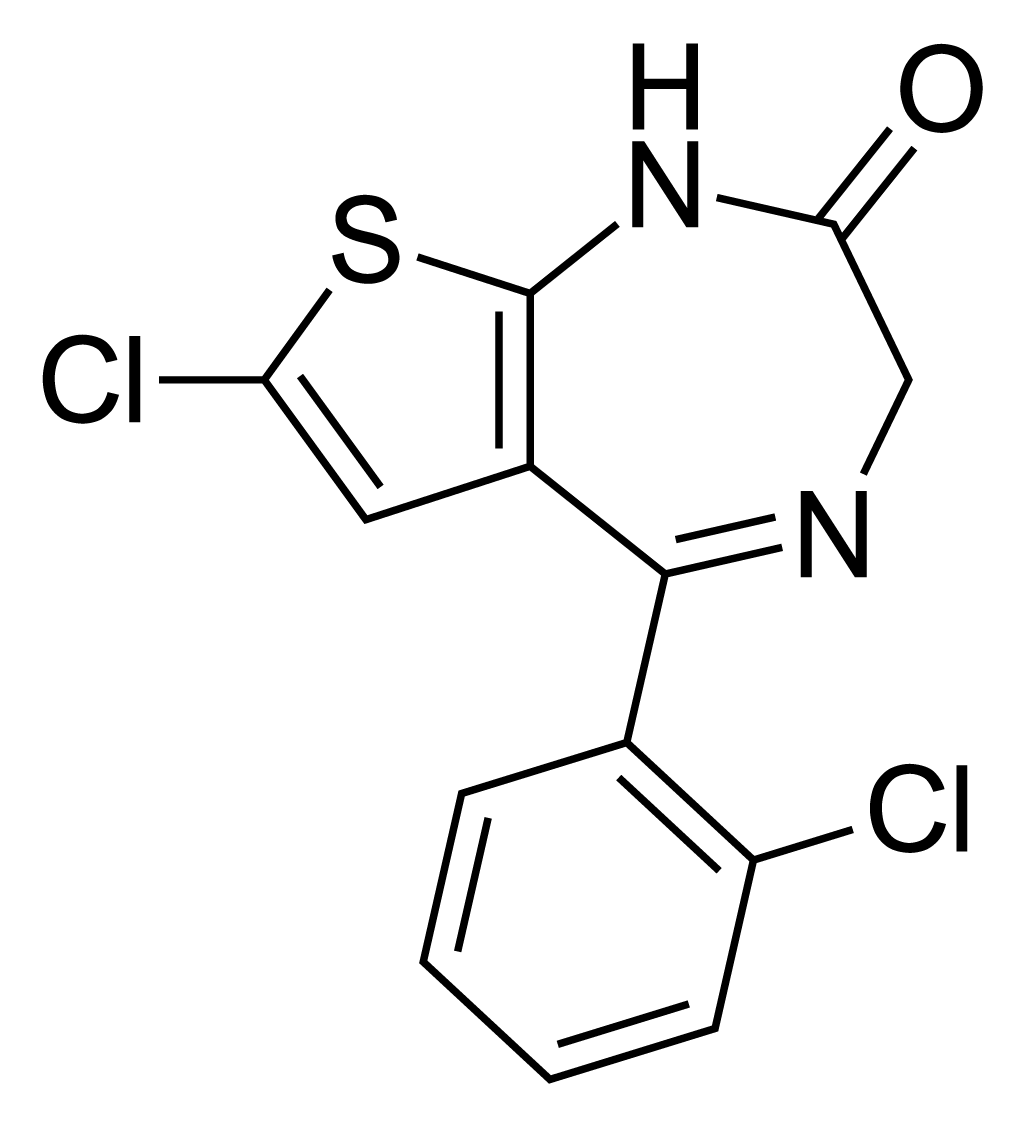

Identifiers
- IUPAC name: 7-chloro-5-(2-chlorophenyl)-1,3-dihydrothieno[2,3-e][1,4]diazepin-2-one
- CAS Number: 36811-59-3
- PubChem CID: 135721042
- ChemSpider: 15052752
- CompTox Dashboard (EPA): DTXSID801337052

Chemical and physical data
- Formula: C_{13}H_{8}Cl_{2}N_{2}OS
- Molar mass: 311.18 g·mol^{−1}
- 3D model (JSmol): Interactive image
- SMILES: C1C(=O)NC2=C(C=C(S2)Cl)C(=N1)C3=CC=CC=C3Cl
- InChI: InChI=1S/C13H8Cl2N2OS/c14-9-4-2-1-3-7(9)12-8-5-10(15)19-13(8)17-11(18)6-16-12/h1-5H,6H2,(H,17,18); Key:QBZXYZQVZOKZRX-UHFFFAOYSA-N

Ro09-9212 is a thienodiazepine derivative with sedative and anxiolytic effects, which has been sold as a designer drug.

== See also ==
- Clotiazepam
- Clotizolam
- Diclazepam
- Etizolam
- Flubrotizolam
- Fluclotizolam
- Fluetizolam
- Ro07-4065
- Ro20-8552
