= Platelet-activating factor receptor =

Protein found in humans

PTAFR

Identifiers
- Aliases: PTAFR, PAFR, platelet activating factor receptor
- External IDs: OMIM: 173393; MGI: 106066; GeneCards: PTAFR
Available structures
PDB	Ortholog search: PDBe RCSB
PDB	List of PDB id codes 2B0X

Gene location (Human)
Chr.	Chromosome 1 (human)
Band	1p35.3	Start	28,147,166 bp
Band	1p35.3	End	28,193,936 bp

Gene location (Mouse)
Chr.	Chromosome 4 (mouse)
Band	4 D2.3|4 65.56 cM	Start	132,291,378 bp
Band	4 D2.3|4 65.56 cM	End	132,309,994 bp
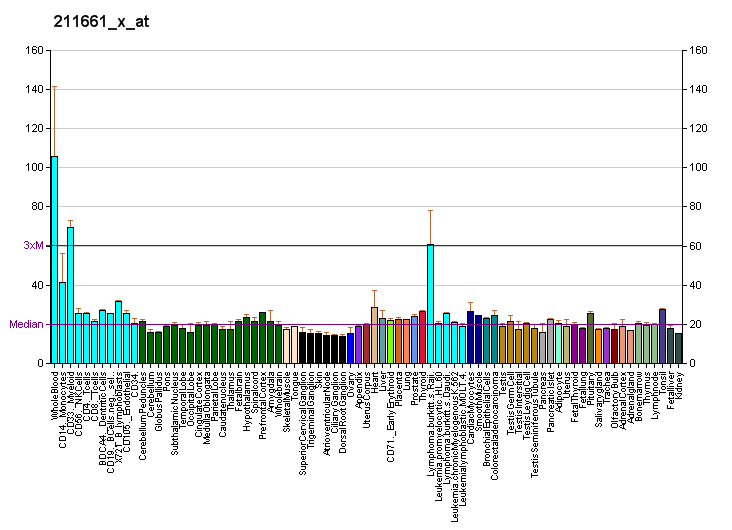

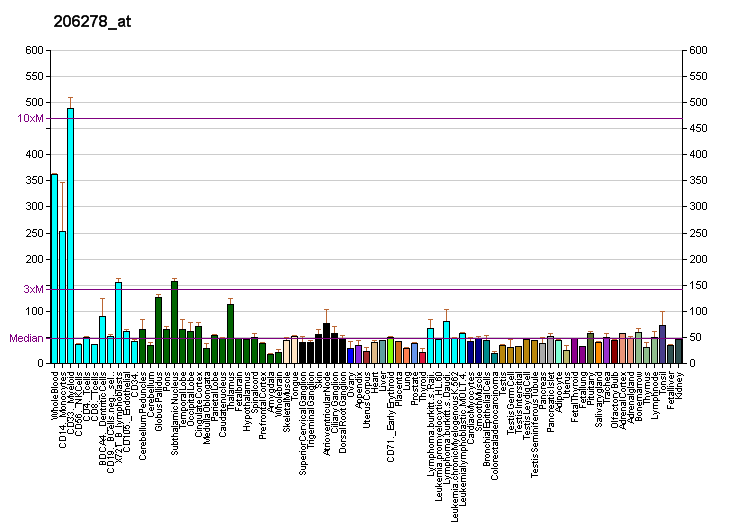
RNA expression pattern
Bgee	Human / Mouse (ortholog); Top expressed in: monocyte; blood; granulocyte; bone marrow; vena cava; nasal epithelium; pericardium; cecum; body of tongue; bone marrow cell / Top expressed in: granulocyte; bone marrow; white adipose tissue; jejunum; esophagus; ileum; spleen; zone of skin; urinary bladder; muscle of thigh; More reference expression data
BioGPS	More reference expression data
Gene ontology
Molecular function	G protein-coupled receptor activity; G protein-coupled purinergic nucleotide receptor activity; lipopolysaccharide binding; signal transducer activity; mitogen-activated protein kinase binding; platelet activating factor receptor activity; phospholipid binding; lipopolysaccharide immune receptor activity; protein binding
Cellular component	integral component of membrane; membrane; integral component of plasma membrane; plasma membrane; secretory granule membrane; tertiary granule membrane
Biological process	G protein-coupled receptor signaling pathway; positive regulation of leukocyte tethering or rolling; inositol trisphosphate biosynthetic process; positive regulation of voltage-gated chloride channel activity; positive regulation of phospholipase C activity; negative regulation of blood pressure; interferon-gamma-mediated signaling pathway; positive regulation of inositol phosphate biosynthetic process; regulation of transcription by RNA polymerase II; positive regulation of transcytosis; cytokine production; response to 2-O-acetyl-1-O-hexadecyl-sn-glycero-3-phosphocholine; response to symbiotic bacterium; transcytosis; positive regulation of translation; cellular response to gravity; response to dexamethasone; positive regulation of cellular extravasation; positive regulation of maternal process involved in parturition; chemotaxis; cellular response to 2-O-acetyl-1-O-hexadecyl-sn-glycero-3-phosphocholine; positive regulation of sensory perception of pain; response to lipopolysaccharide; cellular response to fatty acid; response to organophosphorus; birth; positive regulation of vasoconstriction; immune response; positive regulation of gastro-intestinal system smooth muscle contraction; positive regulation of tumor necrosis factor production; inflammatory response; positive regulation of smooth muscle contraction; positive regulation of neutrophil degranulation; positive regulation of leukocyte cell-cell adhesion; phosphatidylinositol-mediated signaling; lipopolysaccharide-mediated signaling pathway; cellular response to cAMP; signal transduction; positive regulation of smooth muscle cell proliferation; G protein-coupled purinergic nucleotide receptor signaling pathway; neutrophil degranulation; cytokine-mediated signaling pathway
Sources:Amigo / QuickGO
Orthologs
Databases	NCBI: entry; OMA: entry
Species	Human	Mouse
Entrez	5724	19204
Ensembl	ENSG00000169403	ENSMUSG00000056529
UniProt	P25105	Q62035
RefSeq (mRNA)	NM_001164723; NM_000952; NM_001164721; NM_001164722	NM_001081211
RefSeq (protein)	NP_000943; NP_001158193; NP_001158194; NP_001158195	NP_001074680
Location (UCSC)	Chr 1: 28.15 – 28.19 Mb	Chr 4: 132.29 – 132.31 Mb
PubMed search
- Wikidata
View/Edit Human	View/Edit Mouse

The platelet-activating factor receptor (PAF-R) is a G-protein coupled receptor which binds platelet-activating factor. It is encoded in the human by the PTAFR gene.

The PAF receptor shows structural characteristics of the rhodopsin (MIM 180380) gene family and binds platelet-activating factor (PAF). PAF is a phospholipid (1-0-alkyl-2-acetyl-sn-glycero-3-phosphorylcholine) that has been implicated as a mediator in diverse pathologic processes, such as allergy, asthma, septic shock, arterial thrombosis, and inflammatory processes.[supplied by OMIM] Its pathogenetic role in chronic kidney failure has also been reported recently.

== Ligands ==
Agonists

- Platelet activating factor

Antagonists

- Apafant (WEB-2086)
- Israpafant (Y-24180)
- Lexipafant
- Rupatadine
