= Fluetizolam =

Chemical compound

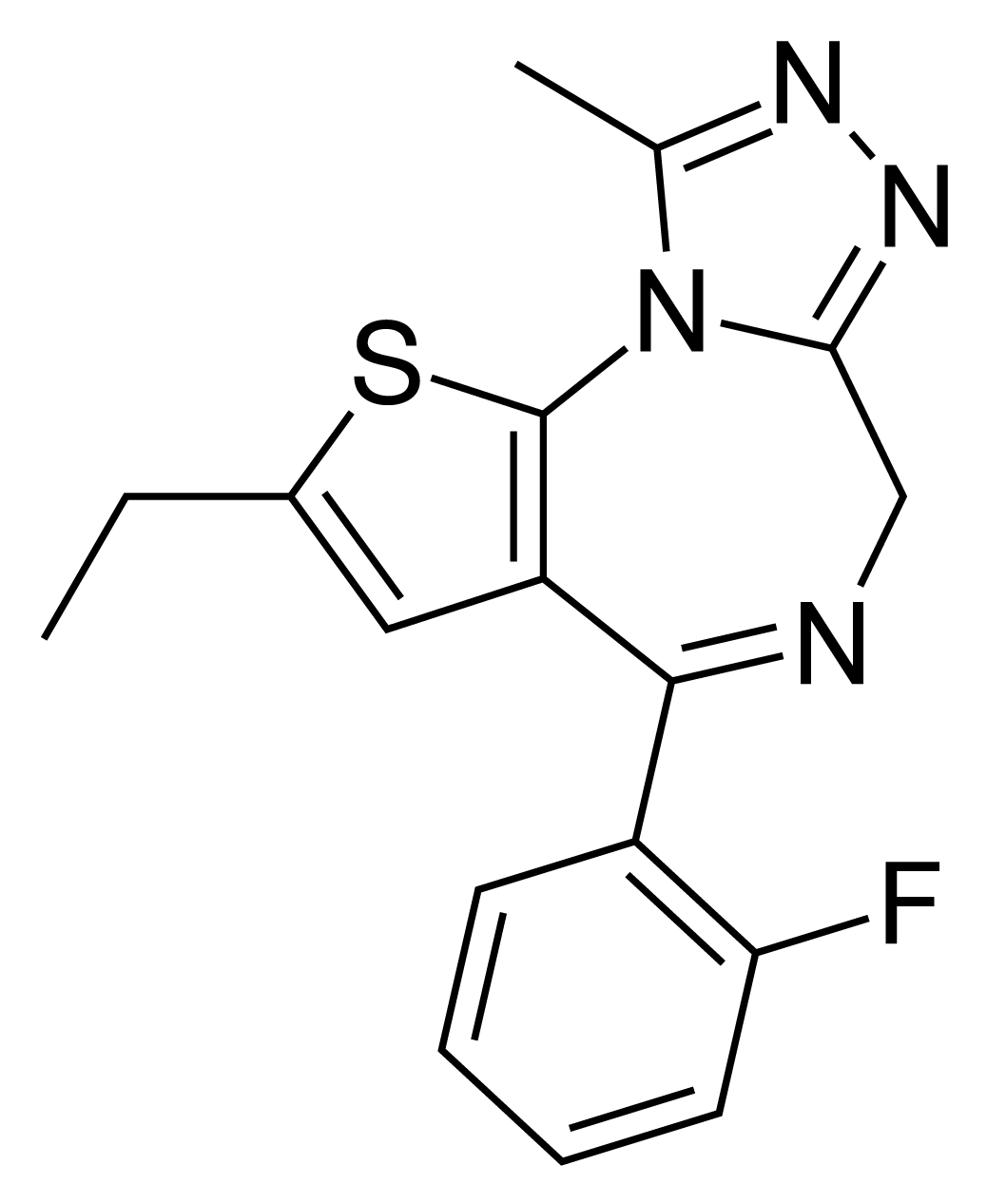

Clinical data
- Other names: 2-Ethyl-4-(2-fluorophenyl)-9-methyl-6H-thieno[3,2-f][1,2,4]triazolo[4,3-a][1,4]diazepine

Legal status
- Legal status: DE: NpSG (Industrial and scientific use only); UK: Under Psychoactive Substances Act

Identifiers
- IUPAC name: 4-ethyl-7-(2-fluorophenyl)-13-methyl-3-thia-1,8,11,12-tetrazatricyclo[8.3.0.0^{2,6}]trideca-2(6),4,7,10,12-pentaene
- CAS Number: 40054-88-4
- PubChem CID: 12434320
- ChemSpider: 114951959
- CompTox Dashboard (EPA): DTXSID101337063

Chemical and physical data
- Formula: C_{17}H_{15}FN_{4}S
- Molar mass: 326.39 g·mol^{−1}
- 3D model (JSmol): Interactive image
- SMILES: CCC1=CC2=C(S1)N3C(=NN=C3CN=C2C4=CC=CC=C4F)C
- InChI: InChI=1S/C17H15FN4S/c1-3-11-8-13-16(12-6-4-5-7-14(12)18)19-9-15-21-20-10(2)22(15)17(13)23-11/h4-8H,3,9H2,1-2H3; Key:BCKPHENWWQCRCG-UHFFFAOYSA-N

Fluetizolam (2-ethyl-4-(2-fluorophenyl)-9-methyl-6H-thieno[3,2-f][1,2,4]triazolo[4,3-a][1,4]diazepine) is a thienotriazolodiazepine derivative with potent sedative and anxiolytic effects, which has been sold as a designer drug.

== See also ==
- Brotizolam
- Clotiazepam
- Flualprazolam
- Flubrotizolam
- Fluclotizolam
- Etizolam
- Ro09-9212
