= Ro 19-4603 =

Benzodiazepine antagonist

Names
- IUPAC name tert-Butyl 8-methyl-7-oxo-5-thia-1,8,12-triazatricyclo[8.3.0.0^{2,6}]trideca-2(6),3,10,12-tetraene-11-carboxylate

Identifiers
CAS Number	99632-94-7
3D model (JSmol)	Interactive image
ChEBI	CHEBI:34952
ChEMBL	ChEMBL269366
ChemSpider	113034
IUPHAR/BPS	4297
KEGG	C13716
PubChem CID	127382
CompTox Dashboard (EPA)	DTXSID90244173
- InChI: InChI=1S/C15H17N3O3S/c1-15(2,3)21-14(20)11-10-7-17(4)13(19)12-9(5-6-22-12)18(10)8-16-11/h5-6,8H,7H2,1-4H3 Key: ZIGMMUKDYCABPW-UHFFFAOYSA-N
- SMILES: CC(C)(C)OC(=O)C1=C2CN(C(=O)C3=C(N2C=N1)C=CS3)C

Properties
Chemical formula	C_{15}H_{17}N_{3}O_{3}S
Molar mass	319.38 g·mol^{−1}
- Except where otherwise noted, data are given for materials in their standard state (at 25 °C [77 °F], 100 kPa). Infobox references

Ro 19-4603 is an inverse agonist of the benzodiazepine binding site. It has effects antagonistic to those of benzodiazepines.

== Chemistry ==
Despite acting at the benzodiazepine site, it does not possess the benzodiazepine structure. It is an imidazothienodiazepine: a thiophene ring, an imidazole ring, and a diazepine ring fused together.

== Effects and pharmacodynamics ==
Ro 19-4603 is an inverse agonist at the benzodiazepine binding site. Due to this, it has effects similar to other benzodiazepine inverse agonists, notably: anxiogenesis and convulsions.

In animal studies, administration of this compound was able to decrease voluntary alcohol consumption. This was observed in rats selected for high alcohol preference. In addition to decreasing its consumption, Ro 19-4603 is able to antagonize the intoxicating effects of alcohol.
