= Ciclotizolam =

Chemical compound

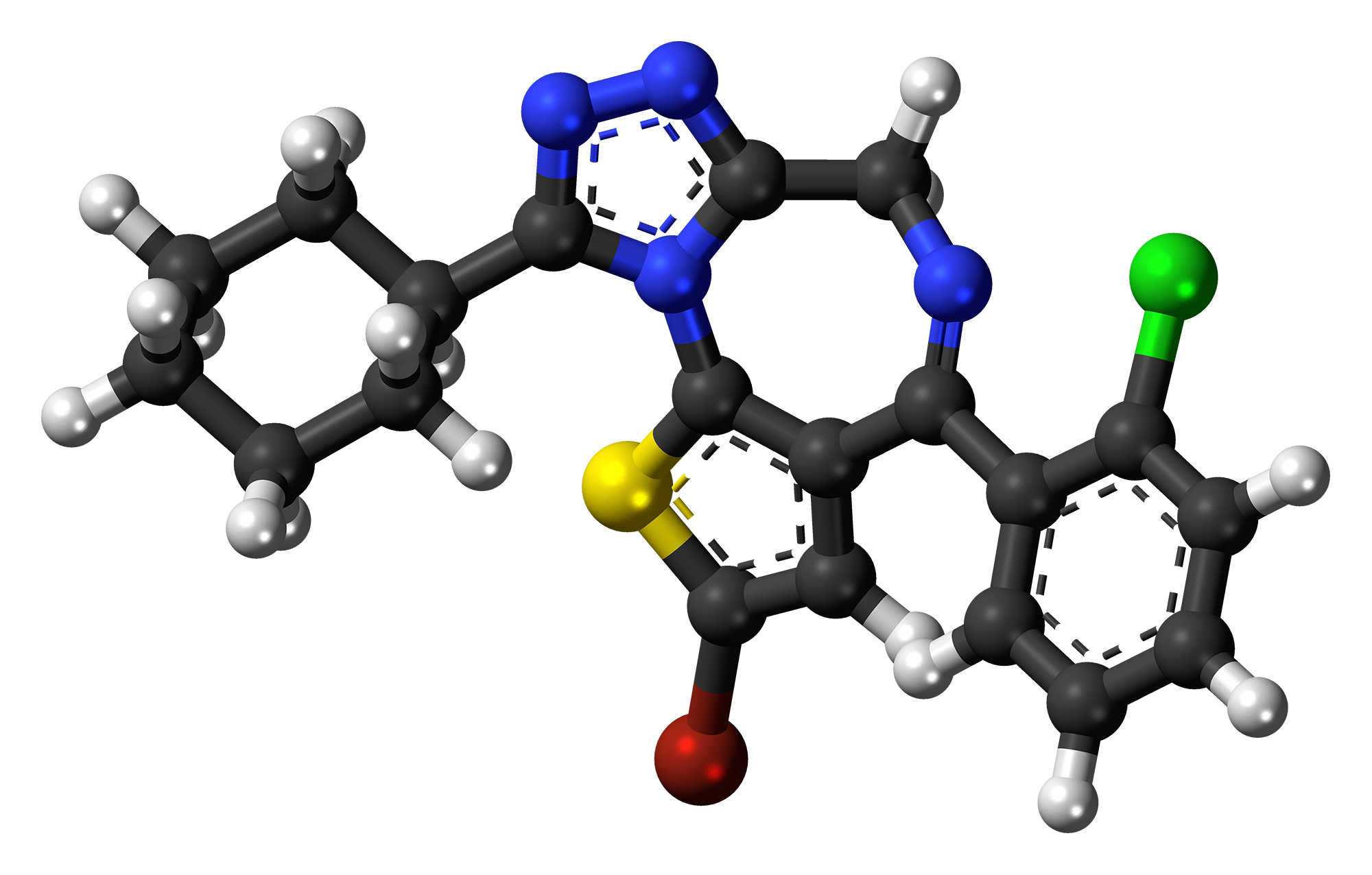

Clinical data
- ATC code: none

Legal status
- Legal status: CA: Schedule IV

Identifiers
- IUPAC name: 8-bromo-6-(o-chlorophenyl)-1-cyclohexyl-4H-5-triazolo(3,4-c)thieno(2,4-e)-1,4-diazepine
- CAS Number: 58765-21-2
- PubChem CID: 71949
- ChemSpider: 64956
- UNII: JK517QTN4Q
- ChEMBL: ChEMBL2105986
- CompTox Dashboard (EPA): DTXSID40866708

Chemical and physical data
- Formula: C_{20}H_{18}BrClN_{4}S
- Molar mass: 461.81 g·mol^{−1}
- 3D model (JSmol): Interactive image
- SMILES: Clc5ccccc5C/2=N/Cc1nnc(n1c3sc(Br)cc\23)C4CCCCC4
- InChI: InChI=1S/C20H18BrClN4S/c21-16-10-14-18(13-8-4-5-9-15(13)22)23-11-17-24-25-19(26(17)20(14)27-16)12-6-2-1-3-7-12/h4-5,8-10,12H,1-3,6-7,11H2; Key:ZOSHXIXUCKESEG-UHFFFAOYSA-N

Ciclotizolam (WE-973) is a drug which is a thienotriazolodiazepine derivative. It is a partial agonist for the benzodiazepine site of the GABA_{A} receptor, with similar binding affinity to related compounds like brotizolam, but a low efficacy.

== See also ==
- Benzodiazepine
