= Deschloroetizolam =

Chemical compound

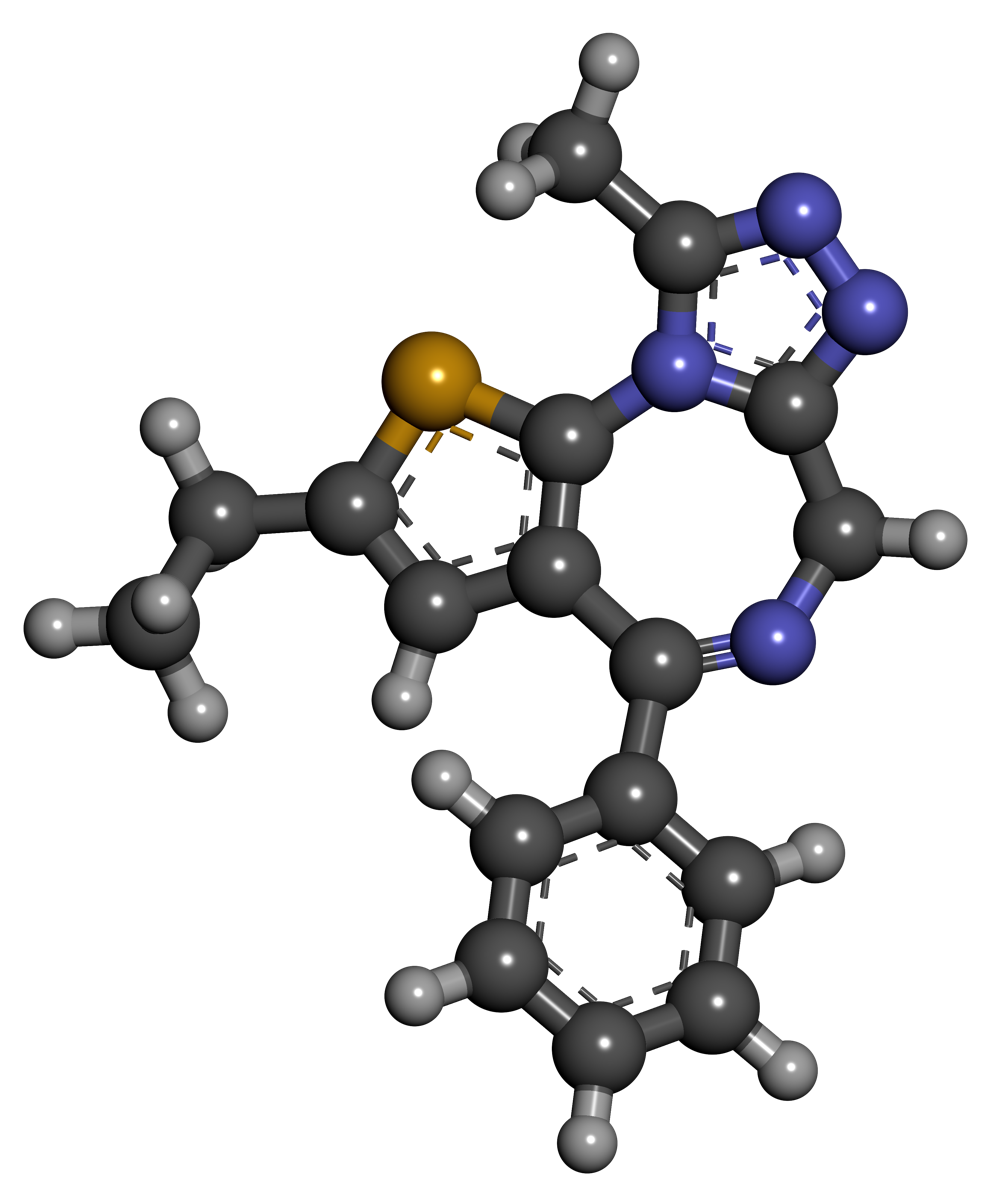

Clinical data
- Dependence liability: Moderate
- Routes of administration: Oral, sublingual, rectal

Legal status
- Legal status: DE: NpSG (Industrial and scientific use only); UK: Class C; Illegal in Sweden

Identifiers
- IUPAC name: 4-phenyl-2-ethyl-9-methyl-6H-thieno[3,2-f][1,2,4]triazolo[4,3-a][1,4]diazepine
- CAS Number: 40054-73-7
- PubChem CID: 827322
- ChemSpider: 722596
- UNII: 69HF7J354D
- CompTox Dashboard (EPA): DTXSID901032639

Chemical and physical data
- Formula: C_{17}H_{16}N_{4}S
- Molar mass: 308.40 g·mol^{−1}
- 3D model (JSmol): Interactive image
- SMILES: CCC1=CC2=C(S1)N3C(=NN=C3CN=C2C4=CC=CC=C4)C
- InChI: InChI=1S/C17H16N4S/c1-3-13-9-14-16(12-7-5-4-6-8-12)18-10-15-20-19-11(2)21(15)17(14)22-13/h4-9H,3,10H2,1-2H3; Key:JIOBORXCOGMHSV-UHFFFAOYSA-N

Deschloroetizolam (also known as Etizolam-2) is a thienotriazolodiazepine that is the dechlorinated analog of the closely related etizolam. The compound has been sold as a designer drug.

== Legal status ==
Deschloroetizolam is classified and controlled as a hazardous substance in Sweden as of on October 15, 2015.

Deschloroetizolam was made schedule I at the state level in Alabama on July 15, 2024.

== See also ==
- Adinazolam
- Clonazolam
- Deschloroclotizolam
- Diclazepam
- Etizolam
- Flubromazepam
- Flubromazolam
- Fluetizolam
- Meclonazepam
- Metizolam
- Nifoxipam
- Pyrazolam
