= Fluclotizolam =

Chemical compound

Legal status
- Legal status: CA: Schedule IV; DE: NpSG (Industrial and scientific use only); UK: Under Psychoactive Substances Act

Identifiers
- IUPAC name: 2-chloro-4-(2-fluorophenyl)-9-methyl-4H-thieno[3,2-f][1,2,4]triazolo[4,3-a][1,4]diazepine
- CAS Number: 54123-15-8
- PubChem CID: 21317700
- ChemSpider: 15332007
- UNII: 4Z9Y7GEG8Z
- CompTox Dashboard (EPA): DTXSID601336484

Chemical and physical data
- Formula: C_{15}H_{10}ClFN_{4}S
- Molar mass: 332.78 g·mol^{−1}
- 3D model (JSmol): Interactive image
- SMILES: Fc4ccccc4C2=NCc1nnc(C)n1c3sc(Cl)cc23
- InChI: InChI=1S/C15H10ClFN4S/c1-8-19-20-13-7-18-14(9-4-2-3-5-11(9)17)10-6-12(16)22-15(10)21(8)13/h2-6H,7H2,1H3; Key:ZDYRCUZZLRLMHG-UHFFFAOYSA-N

Fluclotizolam is a thienotriazolodiazepine derivative which was first synthesised in 1979, but was never marketed. It has subsequently been sold as a designer drug, first being definitively identified in 2017.

== See also ==
- Brotizolam
- Clotizolam
- Deschloroclotizolam
- Etizolam
- Flualprazolam
- Fluadinazolam
- Flubrotizolam
- Fluetizolam
- Ro09-9212
