= Thienotriazolodiazepine =

Chemical compound

Core structure of thienotriazolodiazepines

A thienotriazolodiazepine is a heterocyclic compound containing a diazepine ring fused to thiophene and triazole rings. Thienotriazolodiazepine forms the central core of several pharmaceutical drugs including:

- α-Hydroxyetizolam
- Brotizolam
- Ciclotizolam
- Clotizolam
- Deschloroclotizolam
- Deschloroetizolam
- Etizolam
- Flubrotizolam
- Fluclotizolam
- Fluetizolam
- Metizolam

Thienotriazolodiazepines interact with the benzodiazepine receptor site, they typically have similar effects as 1,4-benzodiazepines (such as diazepam) and triazolobenzodiazepines (such as alprazolam).

Thienotriazolodiazepines that are not GABA_{A} receptor positive allosteric modulators include:

- Apafant
- Israpafant
- JQ1
