= Israpafant =

Chemical compound

Legal status
- Legal status: US: Investigational New Drug

Identifiers
- IUPAC name: (6R)-4-(2-Chlorophenyl)-2-[2-(4-isobutylphenyl)ethyl]-6,9-dimethyl-6H-thieno[3,2-f][1,2,4]triazolo[4,3-a][1,4]diazepine
- CAS Number: 117279-73-9
- PubChem CID: 636426
- ChemSpider: 552203
- UNII: O3MCV749SW
- CompTox Dashboard (EPA): DTXSID001102657

Chemical and physical data
- Formula: C_{28}H_{29}ClN_{4}S
- Molar mass: 489.08 g·mol^{−1}
- 3D model (JSmol): Interactive image
- SMILES: C[C@@H]1C2=NN=C(N2C3=C(C=C(S3)CCC4=CC=C(C=C4)CC(C)C)C(=N1)C5=CC=CC=C5Cl)C
- InChI: InChI=1S/C28H29ClN4S/c1-17(2)15-21-11-9-20(10-12-21)13-14-22-16-24-26(23-7-5-6-8-25(23)29)30-18(3)27-32-31-19(4)33(27)28(24)34-22/h5-12,16-18H,13-15H2,1-4H3/t18-/m1/s1; Key:RMSWMRJVUJSDGN-GOSISDBHSA-N

Israpafant (Y-24180) is a drug which acts as a selective antagonist for the platelet-activating factor receptor, and was originally developed for the treatment of asthma. Its chemical structure is a thienotriazolodiazepine, closely related to the sedative benzodiazepine derivative etizolam. However israpafant binds far more tightly to the platelet-activating factor receptor, with an IC_{50} of 0.84nM for inhibiting PAF-induced human platelet aggregation (compared to etizolam's IC_{50} of 998nM at this target), while it binds only weakly to benzodiazepine receptors, with a Ki of 3680nM. Israpafant has been found to inhibit the activation of eosinophil cells, and consequently delays the development of immune responses. It has also been shown to have anti-nephrotoxic properties, and to mobilize calcium transport.

== See also ==
- JQ1
