= 1,4-Diazepine =

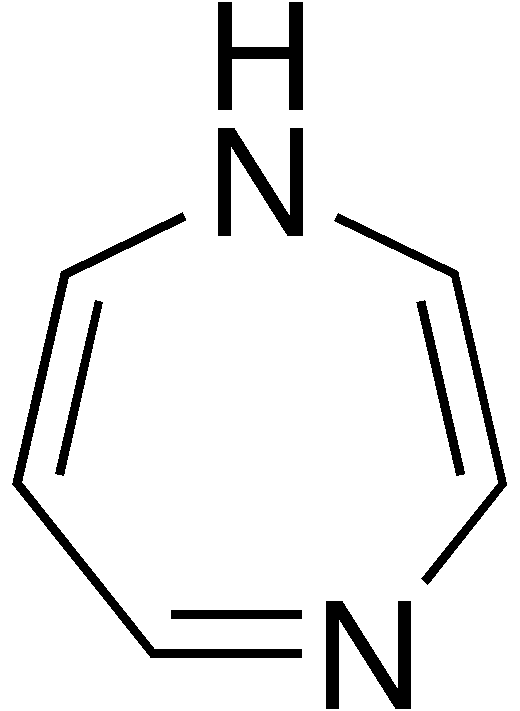

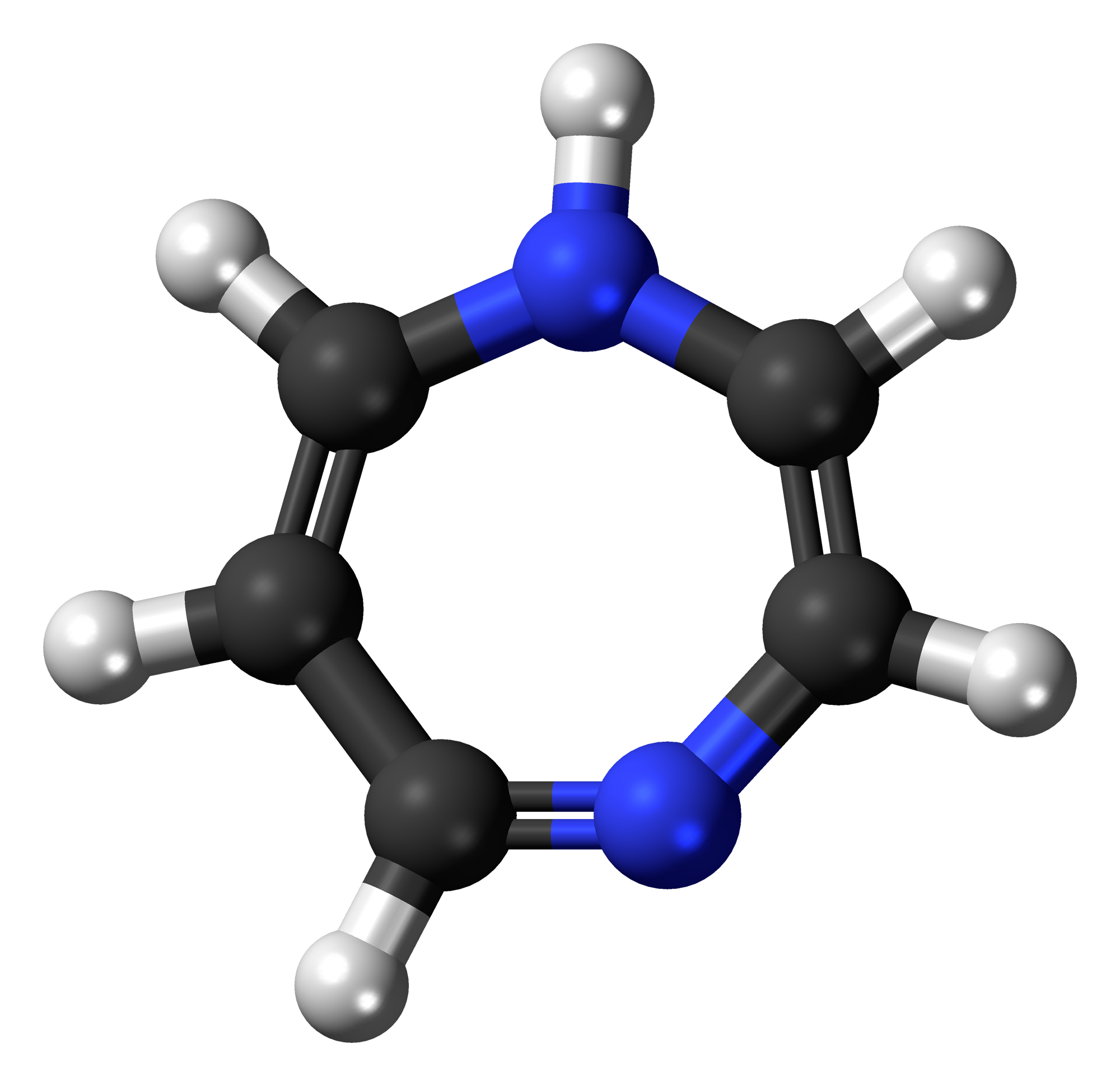

Names
- IUPAC names Tautomer with N-H bond: 1H-1,4-diazepine (the structure shown above); Tautomer without N-H bond: 2H-1,4-diazepine

Identifiers
CAS Number	334-23-6; 292-04-6
3D model (JSmol)	Interactive image; Interactive image
ChemSpider	10629939
PubChem CID	12312963; 21940662
UNII	UG2PHR6ZJX
CompTox Dashboard (EPA)	DTXSID60487414
- InChI: InChI=1S/C5H6N2/c1-2-6-4-5-7-3-1/h1-4H,5H2 Key: JTDPQPJEFUAAGO-UHFFFAOYSA-N; InChI=1/C5H6N2/c1-2-6-4-5-7-3-1/h1-4H,5H2 Key: JTDPQPJEFUAAGO-UHFFFAOYAC
- SMILES: C1C=NC=CC=N1; C1=C\C=N/C\C=N1

Properties
Chemical formula	C_{5}H_{6}N_{2}
Molar mass	94.11454
- Except where otherwise noted, data are given for materials in their standard state (at 25 °C [77 °F], 100 kPa). verify (what is ?) Infobox references

1,4-Diazepine is a diazepine which has been synthesised using a variety of methods. It is a core element in the structure of benzodiazepines and thienodiazepines.
