= Apafant =

Chemical compound

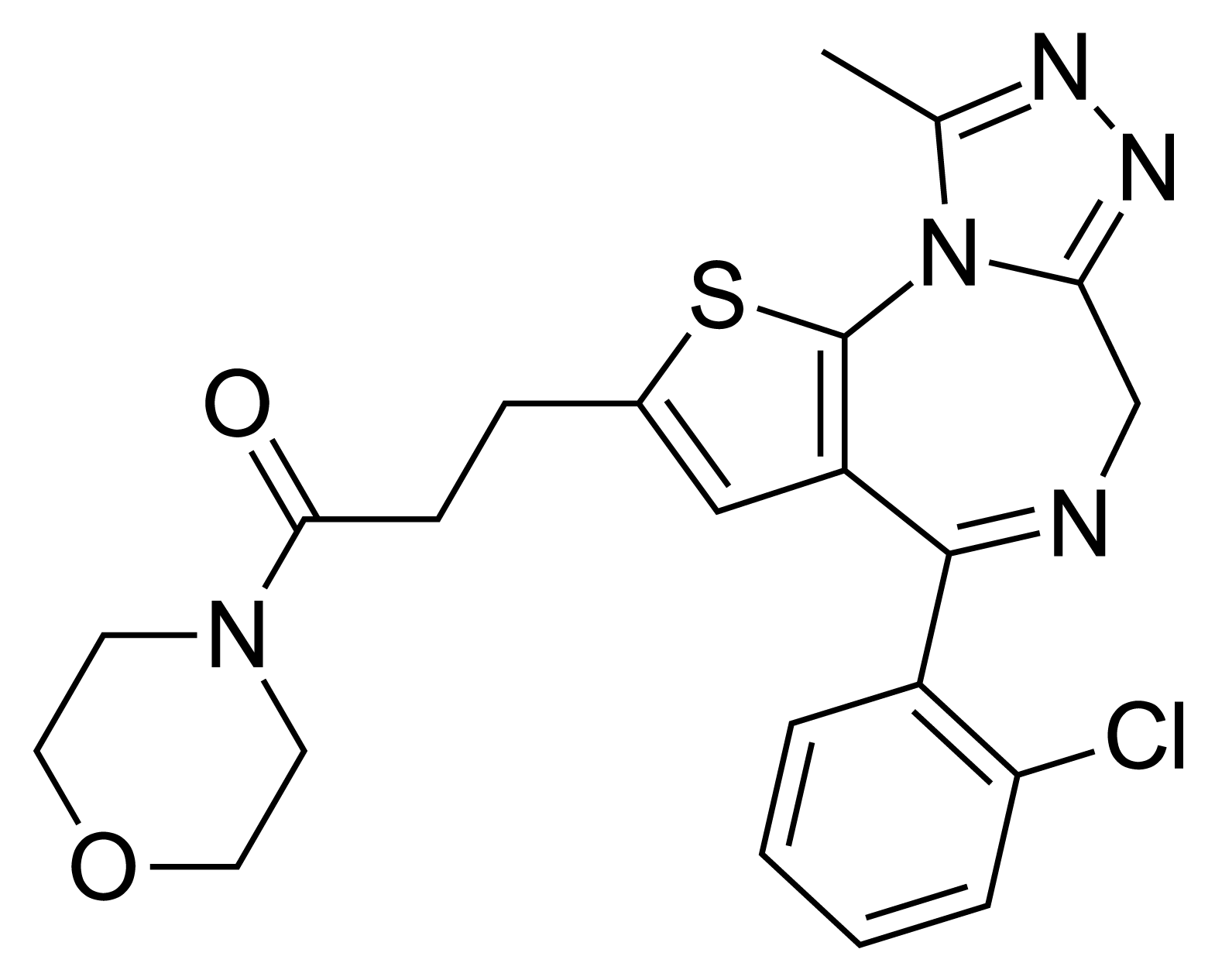

Identifiers
- IUPAC name: 3-(4-(2-chlorophenyl)-9-methyl-6H-thieno[3,2-f][1,2,4]triazolo[4,3-a][1,4]diazepine-2-yl)-1-(4-morpholinyl)-1-propanone
- CAS Number: 105219-56-5
- PubChem CID: 65889
- IUPHAR/BPS: 1859
- ChemSpider: 59298
- UNII: J613NI05SV
- KEGG: D01652
- ChEBI: CHEBI:92490
- ChEMBL: ChEMBL280164
- CompTox Dashboard (EPA): DTXSID5048974
- ECHA InfoCard: 100.220.442

Chemical and physical data
- Formula: C_{22}H_{22}ClN_{5}O_{2}S
- Molar mass: 455.96 g·mol^{−1}
- 3D model (JSmol): Interactive image
- SMILES: CC1=NN=C2N1C3=C(C=C(S3)CCC(=O)N4CCOCC4)C(=NC2)C5=CC=CC=C5Cl
- InChI: InChI=1S/C22H22ClN5O2S/c1-14-25-26-19-13-24-21(16-4-2-3-5-18(16)23)17-12-15(31-22(17)28(14)19)6-7-20(29)27-8-10-30-11-9-27/h2-5,12H,6-11,13H2,1H3; Key:JGPJQFOROWSRRS-UHFFFAOYSA-N

Apafant (WEB-2086, LSM-2613) is a drug which acts as a potent and selective inhibitor of the phospholipid mediator platelet-activating factor (PAF). It was developed by structural modification of the thienotriazolodiazepine sedative drug brotizolam and demonstrated that PAF inhibitory actions could be separated from activity at the benzodiazepine receptor. Apafant was investigated for several applications involving inflammatory responses such as asthma and conjunctivitis but was never adopted for medical use, however it continues to be used in pharmacology research.

== Synthesis ==
The chemical synthesis of Apafant was reported: Precursor: Dan’s book said there is keto present but absent in the database and the patent.

Reaction of the Diethyl 2-(4-oxobutyl)propanedioate, PC88403880 (1) with the 2-Chlorobenzoylacetonitrile [609-772-9] (2) in the presence of sulfur leads to formation of the aminothiophene, Diethyl 2-(5-amino-4-(2-chlorobenzoyl)thiophen-2-ylmethyl)malonate, PC13670761 (3). Saponification of the esters with caustic potash is accompanied by decarboxylation. The re-esterification of the monoacid with methanol then gives 2-Amino-3-(2-chlorobenzoyl)-5-(2-carbomethoxyethyl)thiophene [100827-77-8] (4). Construction of the diazepine ring starts by alkylation of the amino group with bromoacetamide in the presence of base to afford, Methyl 3-[5-[(2-aminoacetyl)amino]-4-(2-chlorobenzoyl)thiophen-2-yl]propanoate, PC13670766 (5). Heating with silica causes the side-chain amide nitrogen to react with the ketone to form a cyclic imine affording 7-(2-Carbomethoxyethyl)-5-(2-chlorophenyl)-thieno-1,4-diazepin-2-one [100827-80-3] (6). The amide carbonyl is converted to a thioamide with phosphorus pentoxide giving, Methyl 3-[5-(2-chlorophenyl)-2-sulfanylidene-1,3-dihydrothieno[2,3-e][1,4]diazepin-7-yl]propanoate, PC136015497 (7). Reaction of this last intermediate with hydrazine gives a cyclic aminoamidine (8). Condensation of that product with orthoacetic acid ester leads to 4-(2-Chlorophenyl)-9-methyl-6H-thieno[3,2-f][1,2,4]triazolo[4,3-a][1,4]diazepine-2-propanoic Acid Methyl Ester, [100827-83-6] (9). Ester–amide interchange of this last product with morpholine completes the synthesis of apafant (10).
