= Thienodiazepine =

Class of chemical compounds

The core structure of thienodiazepines

A thienodiazepine is a heterocyclic compound containing a diazepine ring fused to a thiophene ring.

If R_{1} and R_{2} are part of a triazole ring, the substance is called a "thienotriazolodiazepine."

The thienodiazepine structure forms the central core of some pharmaceutical and recreational drugs, including etizolam, bentazepam, clotiazepam, and tofisopam.

Since thienodiazepines interact with the GABA_{A} benzodiazepine site, they typically have similar effects as benzodiazepines.
