= Deschloroclotizolam =

Designer drug

Legal status
- Legal status: CA: Schedule IV; DE: NpSG (Industrial and scientific use only); UK: Schedule 1

Identifiers
- IUPAC name: 2-chloro-4-phenyl-9-methyl-4H-thieno[3,2-f][1,2,4]triazolo[4,3-a][1,4]diazepine
- CAS Number: 1629324-97-5
- PubChem CID: 157010678
- ChemSpider: 26602514
- UNII: 5UY5T8AK63

Chemical and physical data
- Formula: C_{15}H_{11}ClN_{4}S
- Molar mass: 314.79 g·mol^{−1}
- 3D model (JSmol): Interactive image
- SMILES: CC1=NN=C2N1C3=C(C=C(S3)Cl)C(=NC2)C4=CC=CC=C4
- InChI: InChI=1S/C15H11ClN4S/c1-9-18-19-13-8-17-14(10-5-3-2-4-6-10)11-7-12(16)21-15(11)20(9)13/h2-7H,8H2,1H3; Key:DBAZIULAFZCKIM-UHFFFAOYSA-N

Deschloroclotizolam is a thienotriazolodiazepine derivative which has been sold as a designer drug, first being identified in Sweden in 2021.

== See also ==
- Alprazolam – Benzodiazepine medication
- Clotizolam – Chemical compound
- Deschloroetizolam – Chemical compound
- Fluclotizolam – Chemical compound
