= Flubrotizolam =

Thienotriazolodiazepine

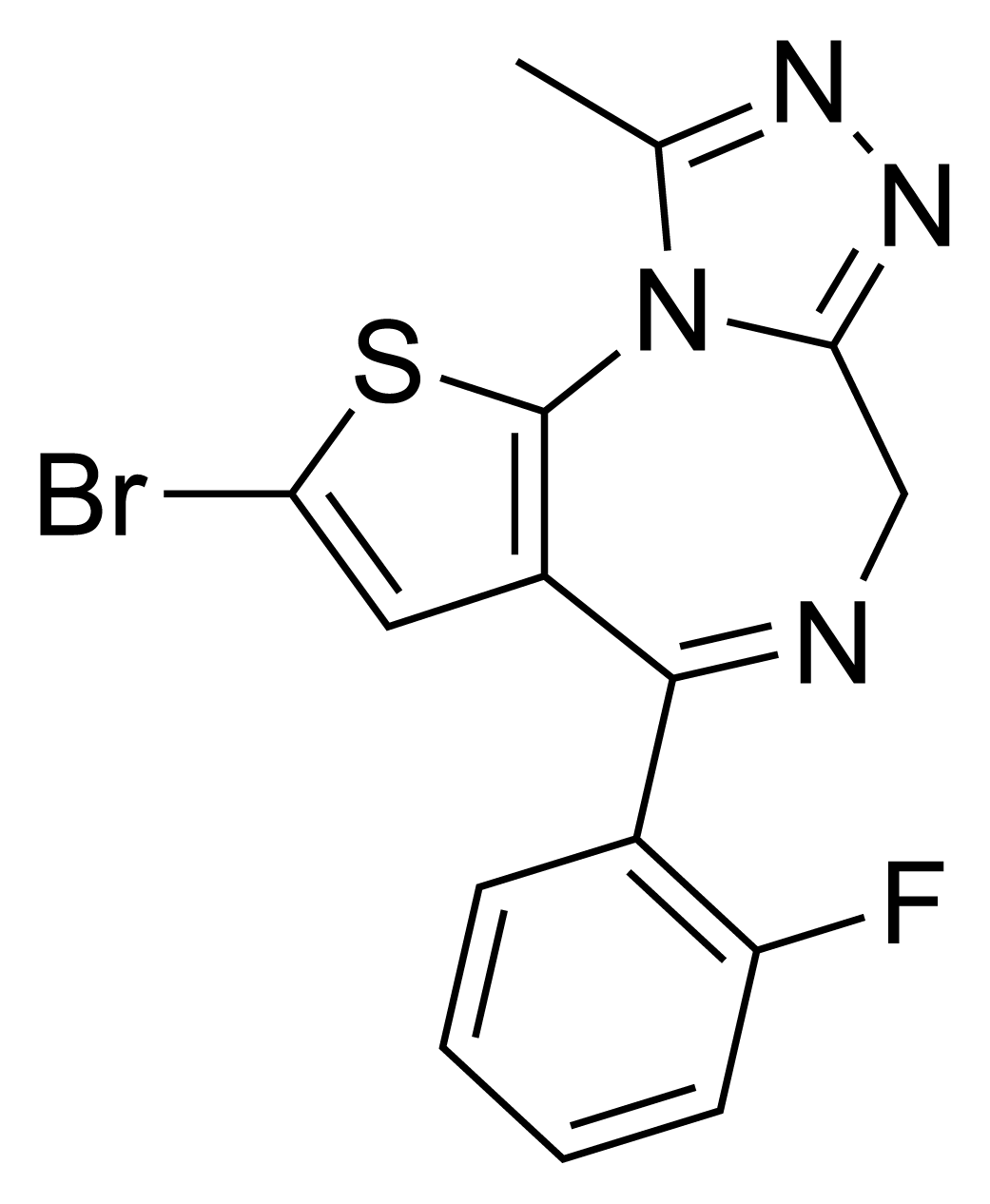

Legal status
- Legal status: DE: NpSG (Industrial and scientific use only); UK: Under Psychoactive Substances Act

Identifiers
- IUPAC name: 4-bromo-7-(2-fluorophenyl)-13-methyl-3-thia-1,8,11,12-tetrazatricyclo[8.3.0.0^{2,6}]trideca-2(6),4,7,10,12-pentaene
- CAS Number: 57801-95-3
- PubChem CID: 3044878
- ChemSpider: 2307727
- UNII: ZWK85P59MH
- CompTox Dashboard (EPA): DTXSID80206503

Chemical and physical data
- Formula: C_{15}H_{10}BrFN_{4}S
- Molar mass: 377.24 g·mol^{−1}
- 3D model (JSmol): Interactive image
- SMILES: CC1=NN=C2N1C3=C(C=C(S3)Br)C(=NC2)C4=CC=CC=C4F
- InChI: InChI=1S/C15H10BrFN4S/c1-8-19-20-13-7-18-14(9-4-2-3-5-11(9)17)10-6-12(16)22-15(10)21(8)13/h2-6H,7H2,1H3; Key:VOZDBDBHBXLWCG-UHFFFAOYSA-N

Flubrotizolam (2-bromo-4-(2-fluorophenyl)-9-methyl-6H-thieno[3,2-f][1,2,4]triazolo[4,3-a][1,4]diazepine) is a thienotriazolodiazepine derivative with potent sedative and anxiolytic effects, which has been sold as a designer drug.

It is sometimes sold illicitly under the name Fanax.

== See also ==
- Brotizolam
- Deschloroclotizolam
- Flubromazolam
- Fluclotizolam
- Etizolam
