= Lexipafant =

Chemical compound

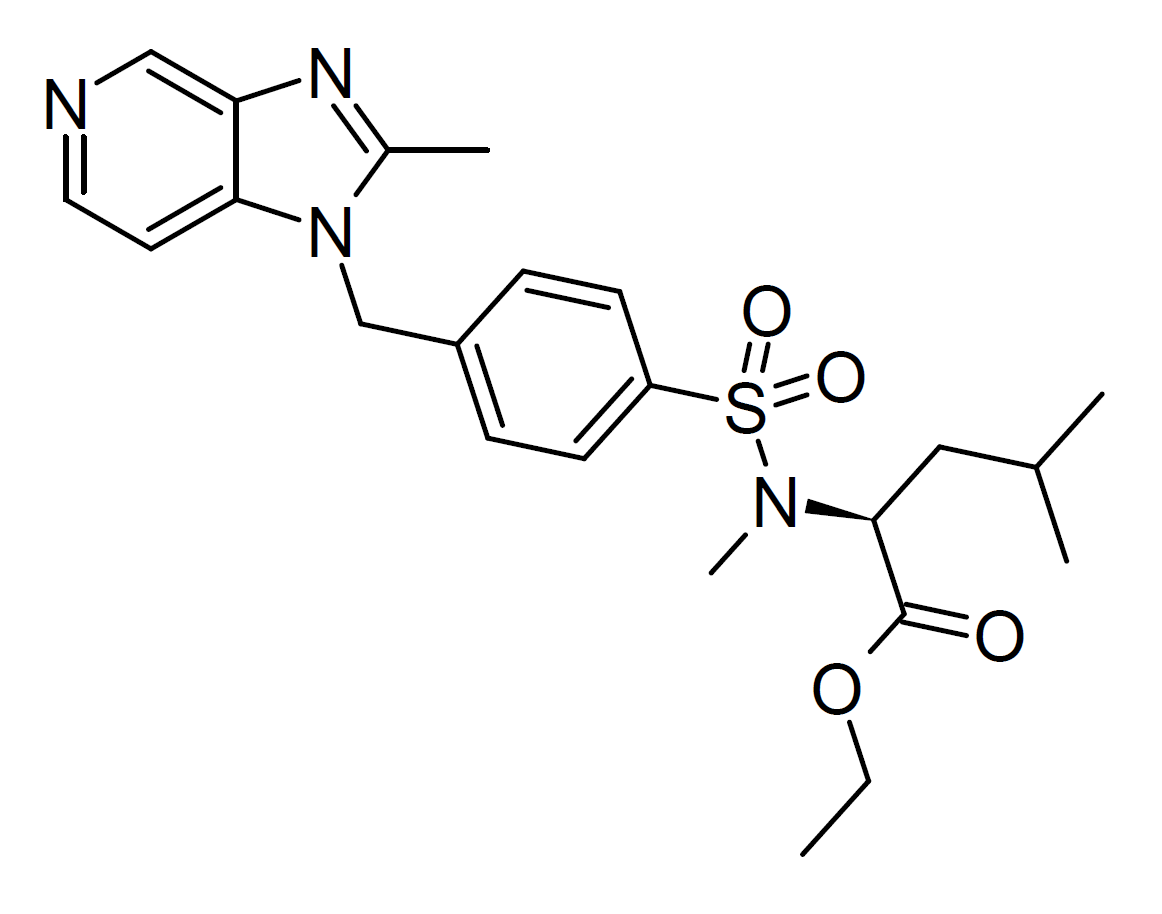

Identifiers
- IUPAC name: ethyl (2S)-4-methyl-2-[methyl-[4-[(2-methylimidazo[4,5-c]pyridin-1-yl)methyl]phenyl]sulfonylamino]pentanoate
- CAS Number: 139133-26-9
- PubChem CID: 9804204
- ChemSpider: 7979964
- UNII: H14917M9YW
- ChEMBL: ChEMBL322832
- CompTox Dashboard (EPA): DTXSID701318348

Chemical and physical data
- Formula: C_{23}H_{30}N_{4}O_{4}S
- Molar mass: 458.58 g·mol^{−1}
- 3D model (JSmol): Interactive image
- SMILES: CCOC(=O)C(CC(C)C)N(C)S(=O)(=O)C1=CC=C(C=C1)CN2C(=NC3=C2C=CN=C3)C
- InChI: InChI=1S/C23H30N4O4S/c1-6-31-23(28)22(13-16(2)3)26(5)32(29,30)19-9-7-18(8-10-19)15-27-17(4)25-20-14-24-12-11-21(20)27/h7-12,14,16,22H,6,13,15H2,1-5H3/t22-/m0/s1; Key:AQRXDPFOYJSPMP-QFIPXVFZSA-N

Lexipafant (BB-882, Zacutex) is a drug which acts as a potent and selective inhibitor of the phospholipid mediator platelet-activating factor (PAF). It was developed in the 1990s by British Biotech with several potential applications, including HIV-associated neurocognitive disorder and acute pancreatitis. Initial results were encouraging and it progressed as far as Phase III clinical trials, but final analysis of trial results showed that it failed to improve survival rates in pancreatitis despite some symptomatic improvement, and it was ultimately discontinued from development as a medicine, though it continues to be used as a model PAF inhibitor for pharmacology research.
