= 1,3-Diazepine =

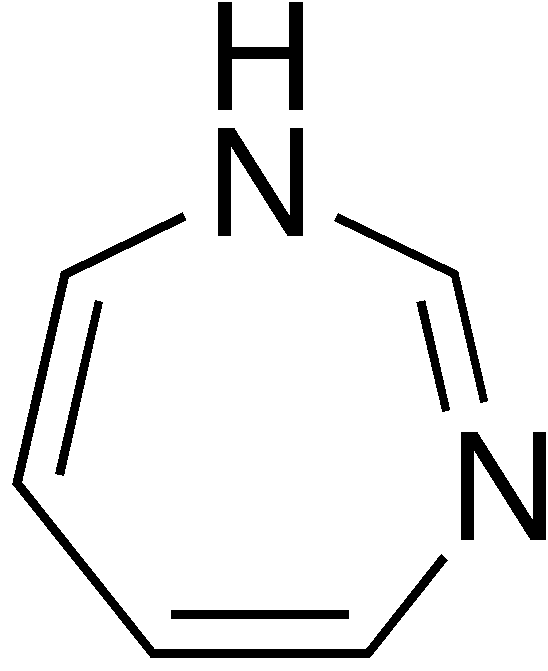

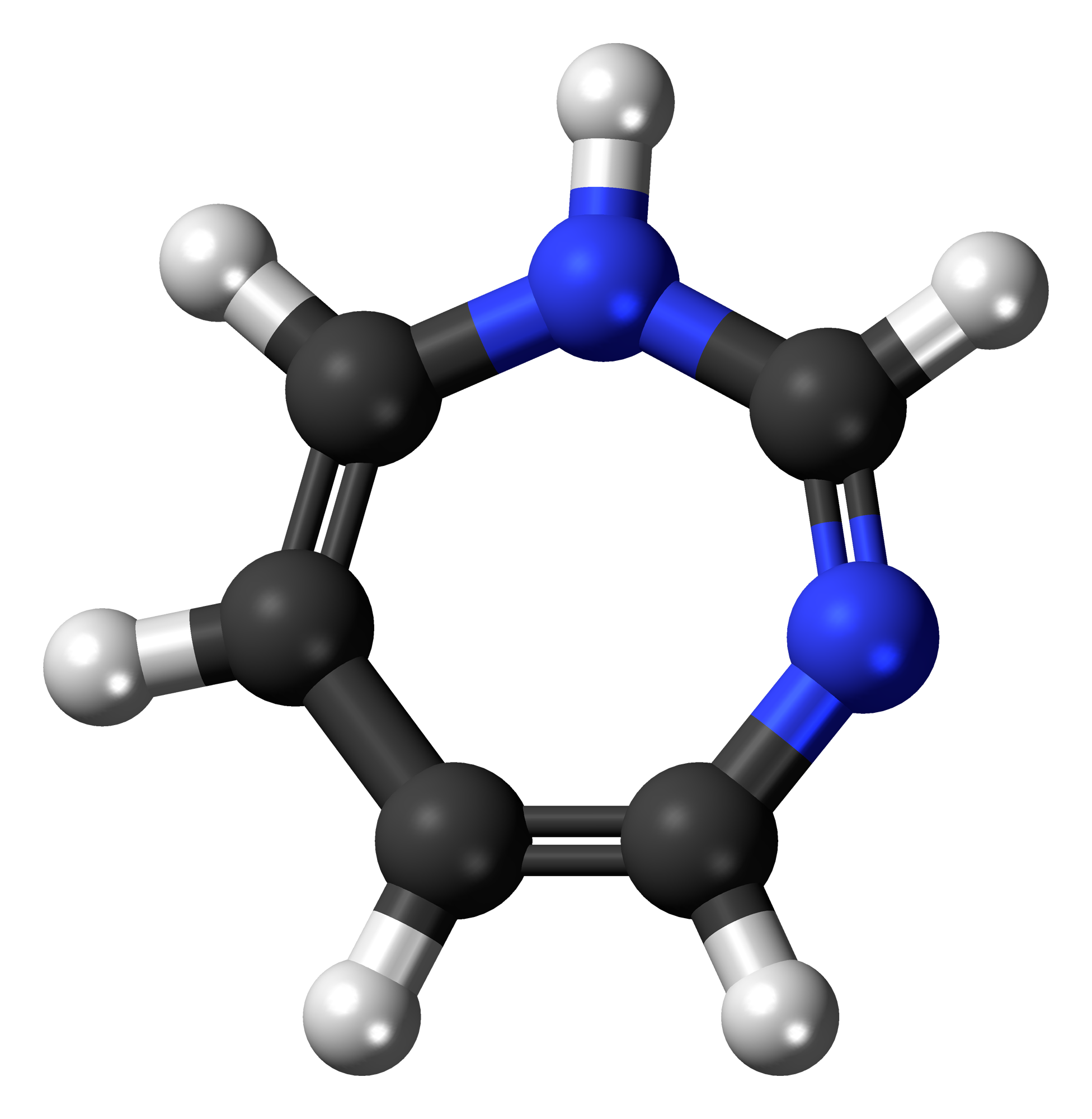

Names
- Preferred IUPAC name 1H-1,3-Diazepine
- Other names Helpositiveic acid

Identifiers
CAS Number	291-88-3
3D model (JSmol)	Interactive image
ChemSpider	10696338
PubChem CID	21940724
UNII	6QTW7BV2KK
CompTox Dashboard (EPA)	DTXSID80620447
- InChI: InChI=1S/C5H6N2/c1-2-4-7-5-6-3-1/h1-4H,5H2 Key: MSRJJSCOWHWGGX-UHFFFAOYSA-N; InChI=1/C5H6N2/c1-2-4-7-5-6-3-1/h1-4H,5H2 Key: MSRJJSCOWHWGGX-UHFFFAOYAS
- SMILES: C1N=CC=CC=N1

Properties
Chemical formula	C_{5}H_{6}N_{2}
Molar mass	94.11454
- Except where otherwise noted, data are given for materials in their standard state (at 25 °C [77 °F], 100 kPa). verify (what is ?) Infobox references

1,3-Diazepine is a diazepine. It is a scaffold found in some natural products and drugs. It is found in the drugs pentostatin and avibactam. Coformycin is a naturally occurring antibiotic.
