= Metizolam =

Chemical compound

Clinical data
- Dependence liability: Moderate
- Routes of administration: Oral, sublingual, rectal

Legal status
- Legal status: CA: Unscheduled; DE: NpSG (Industrial and scientific use only); UK: Under Psychoactive Substances Act; Illegal in Sweden

Identifiers
- IUPAC name: 4-(2-Chlorophenyl)-2-ethyl-6H-thieno[3,2-f][1,2,4]triazolo[4,3-a][1,4]diazepine
- CAS Number: 40054-68-0
- PubChem CID: 12434325
- ChemSpider: 59207712
- UNII: K1C6XI9LLX
- ChEMBL: ChEMBL4782672
- CompTox Dashboard (EPA): DTXSID101032847

Chemical and physical data
- Formula: C_{16}H_{13}ClN_{4}S
- Molar mass: 328.82 g·mol^{−1}
- 3D model (JSmol): Interactive image
- SMILES: ClC1=C(C=CC=C1)C3=NCC2=NN=C[N]2C4=C3C=C(S4)CC
- InChI: InChI=1S/C16H13ClN4S/c1-2-10-7-12-15(11-5-3-4-6-13(11)17)18-8-14-20-19-9-21(14)16(12)22-10/h3-7,9H,2,8H2,1H3; Key:NQSSWDKQLVBUQN-UHFFFAOYSA-N

Metizolam (also known as desmethyletizolam) is a thienotriazolodiazepine that is the demethylated analogue of the closely related etizolam.

== Legal status ==
Following its sale as a designer drug, metizolam was classified as controlled substance in Sweden on 26. January 2016.

== See also ==
- List of benzodiazepine designer drugs
