= 1,2-Diazepine =

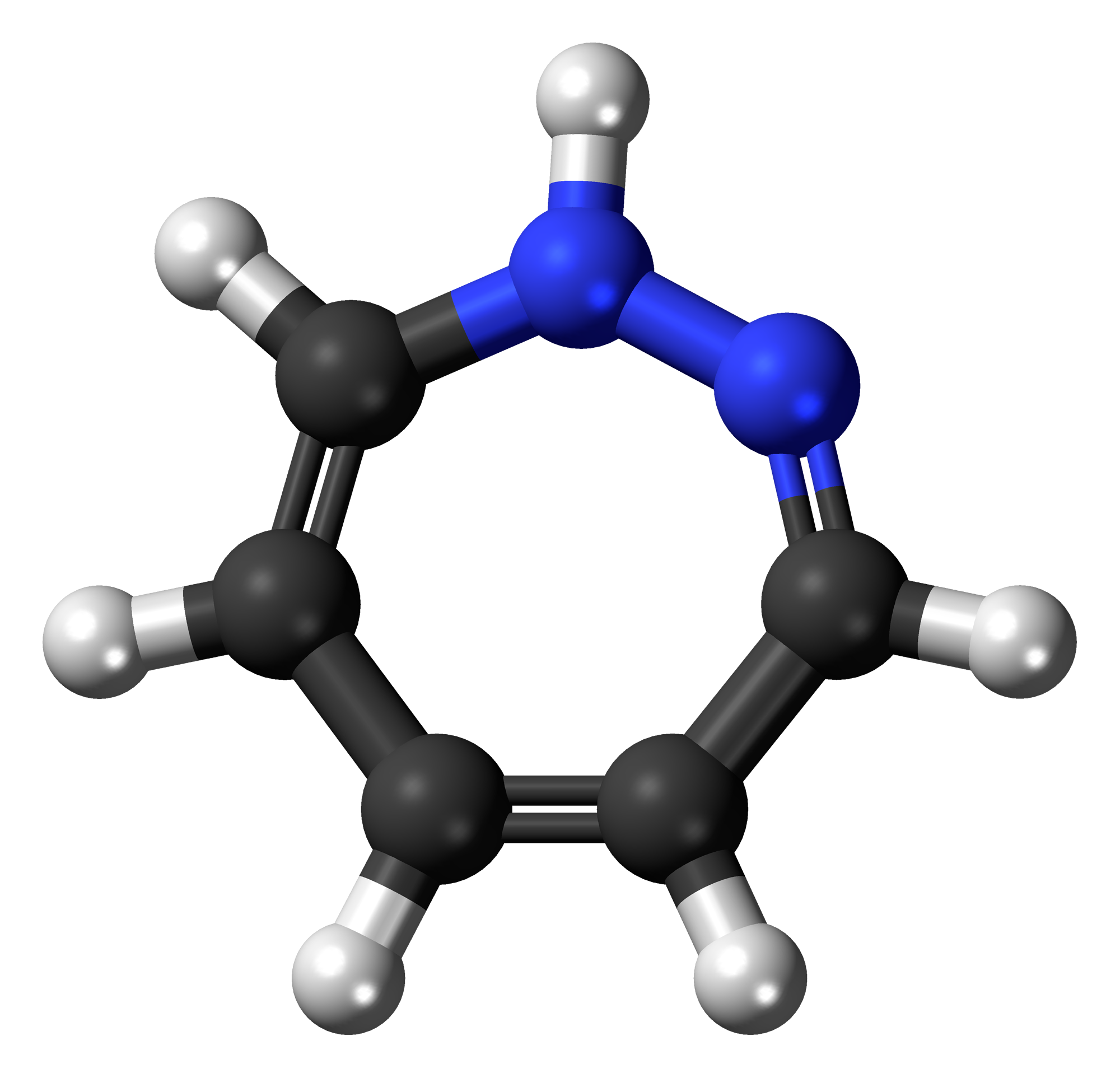

Names
- Preferred IUPAC name 1H-1,2-Diazepine

Identifiers
CAS Number	12688-68-5
3D model (JSmol)	Interactive image; Interactive image
ChemSpider	145874
PubChem CID	166734
CompTox Dashboard (EPA)	DTXSID80155320
- InChI: InChI=1S/C5H6N2/c1-2-4-6-7-5-3-1/h1-6H Key: LRANPJDWHYRCER-UHFFFAOYSA-N; InChI=1/C5H6N2/c1-2-4-6-7-5-3-1/h1-6H Key: LRANPJDWHYRCER-UHFFFAOYAE
- SMILES: C1=CC=NNC=C1; N\1=C\C=C/C=C\N/1

Properties
Chemical formula	C_{5}H_{6}N_{2}
Molar mass	94.11454
- Except where otherwise noted, data are given for materials in their standard state (at 25 °C [77 °F], 100 kPa). verify (what is ?) Infobox references

1,2-Diazepine is a seven-membered heterocyclic compound with two nitrogen atoms (e.g., in ring positions 1 and 2) and three double bonds.

== See also ==
- Azepine
