= Clotiazepam =

Benzodiazepine medication

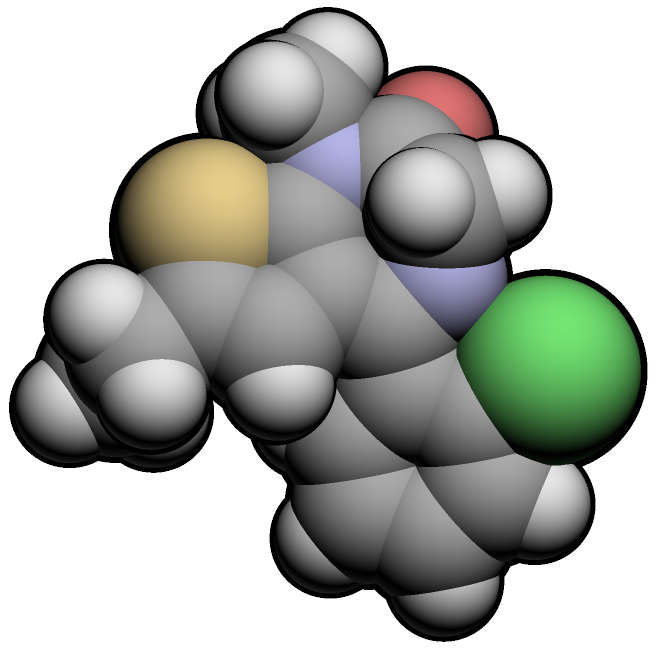

Clinical data
- Trade names: Veratran, Rize, Clozan
- AHFS/Drugs.com: International Drug Names
- Routes of administration: Oral, sublingual, liquid drops
- ATC code: N05BA21 (WHO)

Legal status
- Legal status: BR: Class B1 (Psychoactive drugs); CA: Schedule IV; DE: Prescription only (Anlage III for higher doses); UK: Class C; US: Schedule IV

Pharmacokinetic data
- Bioavailability: ~90%
- Metabolism: Hepatic
- Elimination half-life: 4 hours
- Excretion: Renal

Identifiers
- IUPAC name: 5-(2-chlorophenyl)-7-ethyl-1-methyl-3H-thieno[2,3-e][1,4]diazepin-2-one
- CAS Number: 33671-46-4
- PubChem CID: 2811
- DrugBank: DB01559
- ChemSpider: 2709
- UNII: ZCN055599V
- KEGG: D01328
- ChEMBL: ChEMBL1697737
- CompTox Dashboard (EPA): DTXSID0022852
- ECHA InfoCard: 100.046.920

Chemical and physical data
- Formula: C_{16}H_{15}ClN_{2}OS
- Molar mass: 318.82 g·mol^{−1}
- 3D model (JSmol): Interactive image
- SMILES: ClC1=C(C2=NCC(N(C)C3=C2C=C(CC)S3)=O)C=CC=C1
- InChI: InChI=1S/C16H15ClN2OS/c1-3-10-8-12-15(11-6-4-5-7-13(11)17)18-9-14(20)19(2)16(12)21-10/h4-8H,3,9H2,1-2H3; Key:CHBRHODLKOZEPZ-UHFFFAOYSA-N

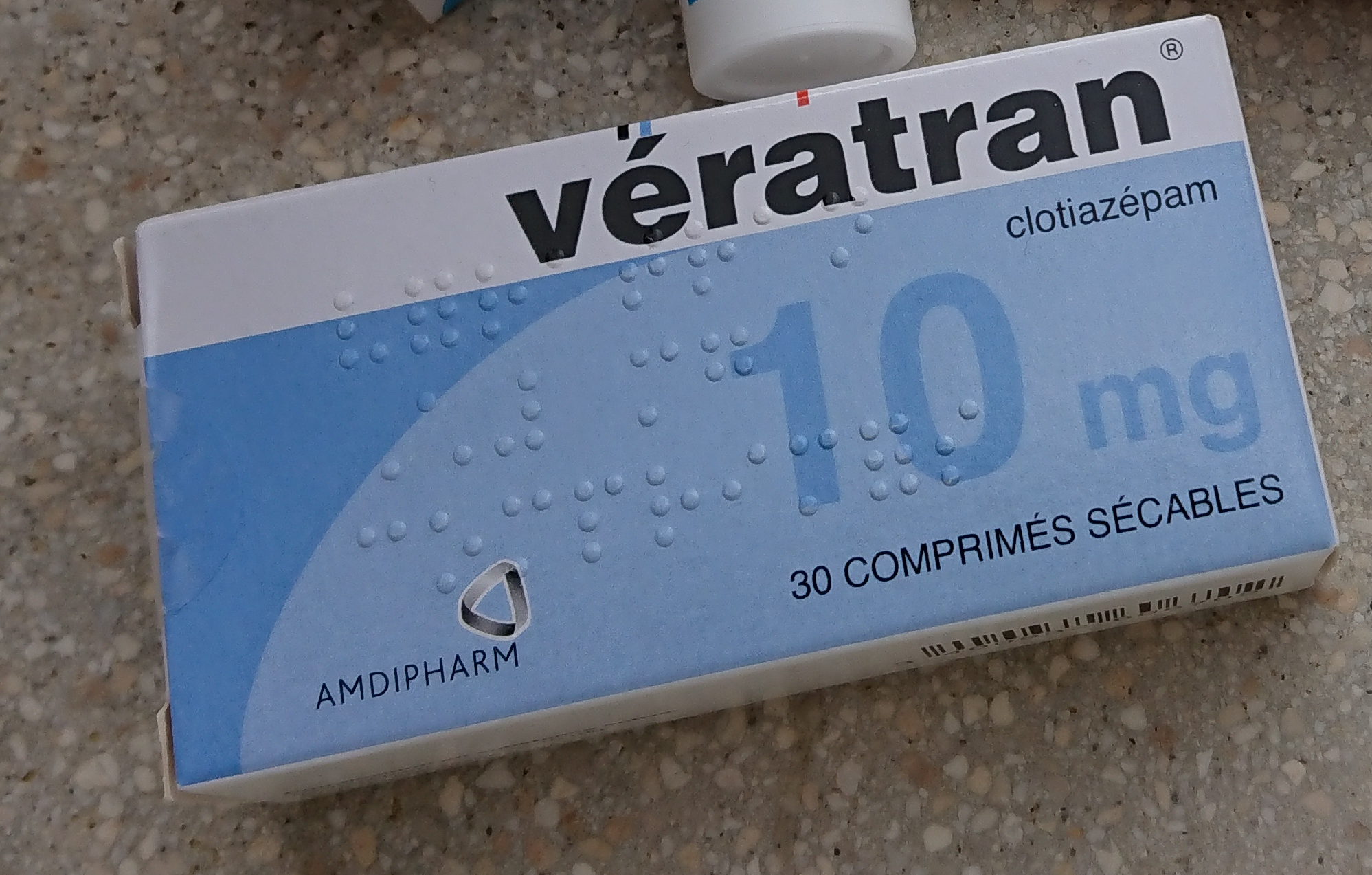
Clotiazepam pills sold in France as Vératran

Clotiazepam (marketed under brand name Clozan, Distensan, Trecalmo, Rize, Rizen and Veratran) is a thienodiazepine drug which is a benzodiazepine analog. The clotiazepam molecule differs from benzodiazepines in that the benzene ring has been replaced by a thiophene ring. It possesses anxiolytic, skeletal muscle relaxant, anticonvulsant, sedative properties. Stage 2 NREM sleep is significantly increased by clotiazepam.

== Indications ==
Clotiazepam has been trialed and found to be effective in the short-term management of anxiety. Clotiazepam is also used as a premedicant in minor surgery in France and Japan, where the drug is commercially available under the brand names Veratran and Rize, respectively.

== Pharmacokinetics ==
A cross-over study in six healthy volunteers (median age 28 years) was conducted using single-dose pharmacokinetics of 5 mg clotiazepam drops, oral tablets, and sublingual tablets. The formulations had similar systemic availability. Compared with oral tablets, the sublingual route gave a lower peak concentration and a delayed peak time, while drops gave a greater maximum concentration with a similar peak time. The use of drops is suggested for a more marked initial effect and the sublingual route for easier administration, especially in the elderly.

== Pharmacology ==
Similar to other benzodiazepines clotiazepam has anxiolytic, sedative, hypnotic, amnesic, anticonvulsant and muscle relaxant pharmacological properties. Clotiazepam binds to the benzodiazepine site of the GABA_{A} receptor where it acts as a full agonist; this action results in an enhanced GABA inhibitory effect at the GABA_{A} receptor which results in the pharmacological effects of clotiazepam.

Clotiazepam has a short elimination half-life and is less prone to accumulation after repeated dosing compared to longer-acting benzodiazepine agents. It is metabolised via oxidation. Clotiazepam is metabolised to hydroxy-clotiazepam and desmethyl-clotiazepam. After oral ingestion of a single 5 mg dose of clotiazepam by three healthy volunteers the drug was rapidly absorbed. The elimination half-life of the drug and its metabolites range from 6.5 hours to 18 hours. Clotiazepam is 99 percent bound to plasma protein. In elderly men the elimination half-life is longer and in elderly women the volume of distribution is increased. Individuals with liver impairment have a reduced volume of distribution as well as a reduced total clearance of clotiazepam; renal impairment does not affect the kinetics of clotiazepam.

The dose equivalent to 10 mg diazepam is thought to be between 5 and 10 mg clotiazepam.

== Side effects ==
Side effects experienced with this product will resemble those of other benzodiazepines. Drowsiness and asthenia are common side effects. There has been a report of reversible hepatitis caused by clotiazepam.

== Abuse ==
Clotiazepam is a recognised drug of abuse.

== See also ==
- List of benzodiazepines
- Etizolam
- Ro09-9212
