= Diazepine =

Seven-membered heterocyclic organic compound with two nitrogen atoms

1,2-Diazepine

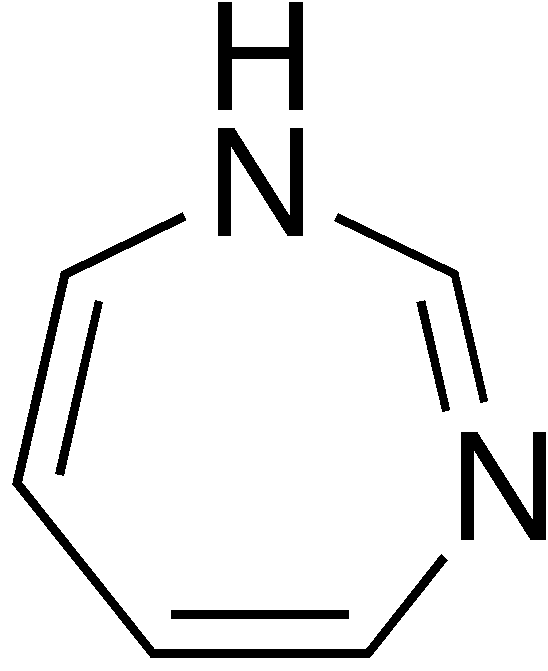
1,3-Diazepine

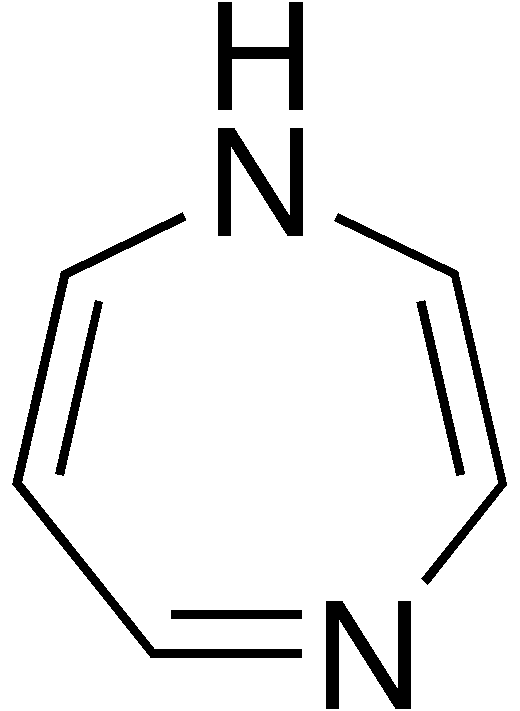
1,4-Diazepine

Diazepines are a group of seven-membered heterocyclic compounds with two nitrogen atoms.

Types include:

- 1,2-Diazepine
- 1,3-Diazepine
- 1,4-Diazepine

== See also ==
- Benzodiazepines, a class of commonly used medications whose structure contains a 1,4-diazepine ring
