= Etizolam =

Benzodiazepine analog drug

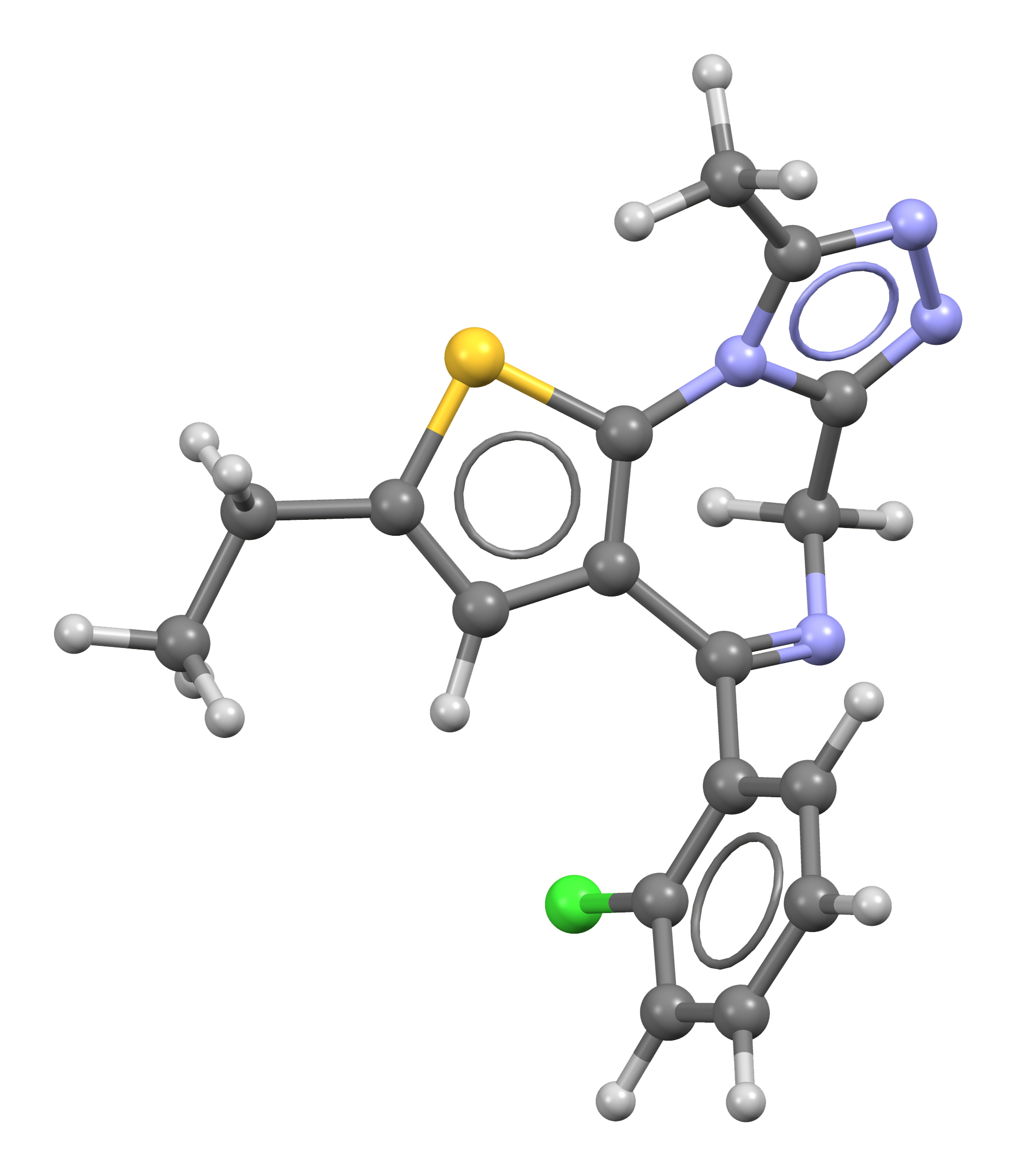

Clinical data
- Trade names: Etizest, Etilaam, Etizex, Depas, Sedekopan, Pasaden
- Dependence liability: Moderate
- Routes of administration: By mouth, sublingual, rectal
- ATC code: N05BA19 (WHO)

Legal status
- Legal status: BR: Class B1 (Psychoactive drugs); CA: Schedule IV; DE: Anlage III (Special prescription form required); UK: Class C; US: Schedule I; UN: Psychotropic Schedule IV; SE: Förteckning IV

Pharmacokinetic data
- Bioavailability: 93%
- Metabolism: Hepatic
- Elimination half-life: 3.4 hours (main metabolite is 8.2 hours)
- Duration of action: 5–7 hours
- Excretion: Kidney

Identifiers
- IUPAC name: 4-(2-Chlorophenyl)-2-ethyl-9-methyl-6H-thieno[3,2-f][1,2,4]triazolo[4,3-a][1,4]diazepine
- CAS Number: 40054-69-1
- PubChem CID: 3307
- ChemSpider: 3191
- UNII: A76XI0HL37
- KEGG: D01514
- ChEMBL: ChEMBL1289779
- CompTox Dashboard (EPA): DTXSID0023030
- ECHA InfoCard: 100.188.773

Chemical and physical data
- Formula: C_{17}H_{15}ClN_{4}S
- Molar mass: 342.85 g·mol^{−1}
- 3D model (JSmol): Interactive image
- SMILES: ClC1=CC=CC=C1C2=NCC3=NN=C(C)N3C4=C2C=C(CC)S4
- InChI: InChI=1S/C17H15ClN4S/c1-3-11-8-13-16(12-6-4-5-7-14(12)18)19-9-15-21-20-10(2)22(15)17(13)23-11/h4-8H,3,9H2,1-2H3; Key:VMZUTJCNQWMAGF-UHFFFAOYSA-N

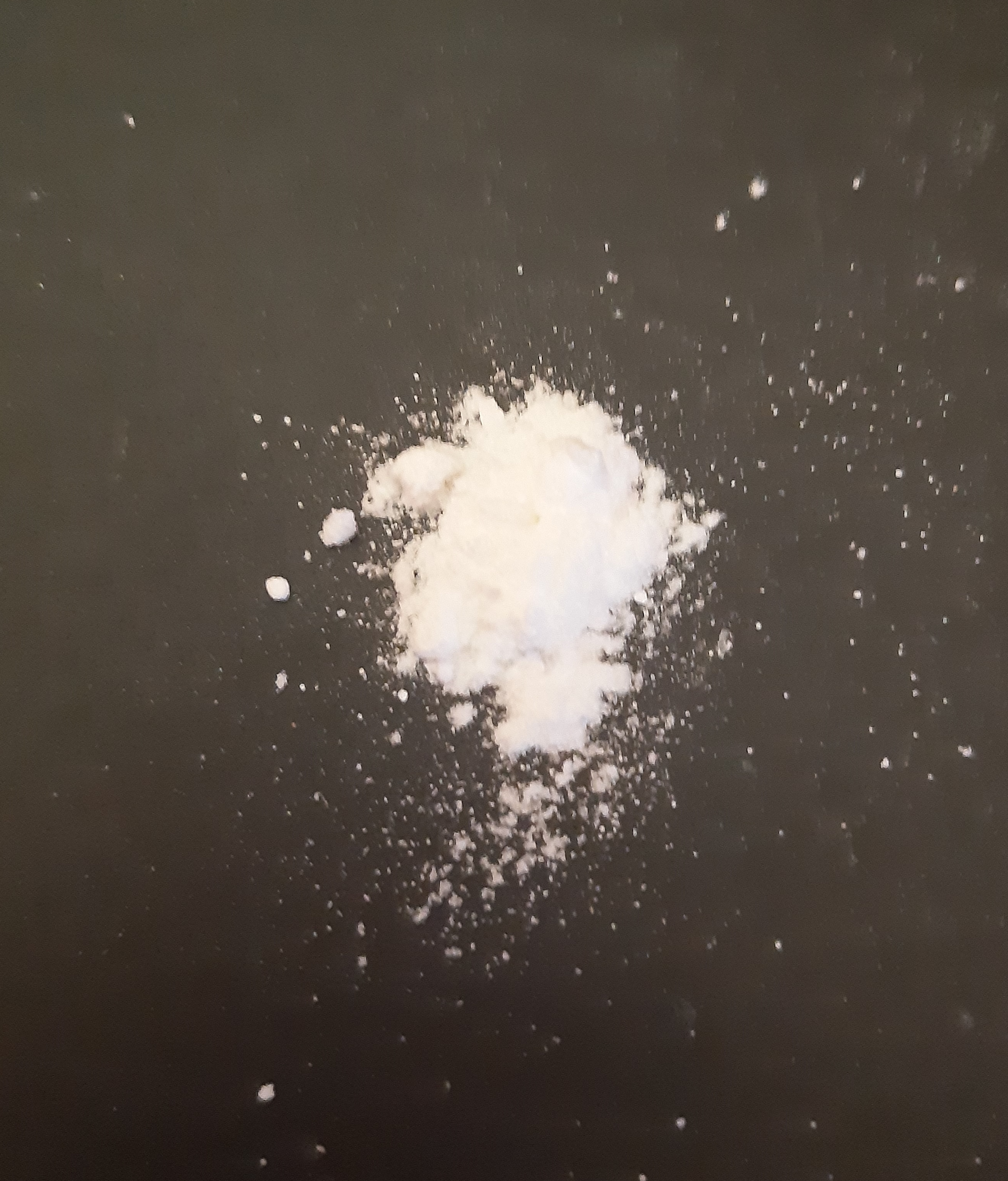
Etizolam powder. Pictured is roughly 150 mg; a standard dose is around 1 mg

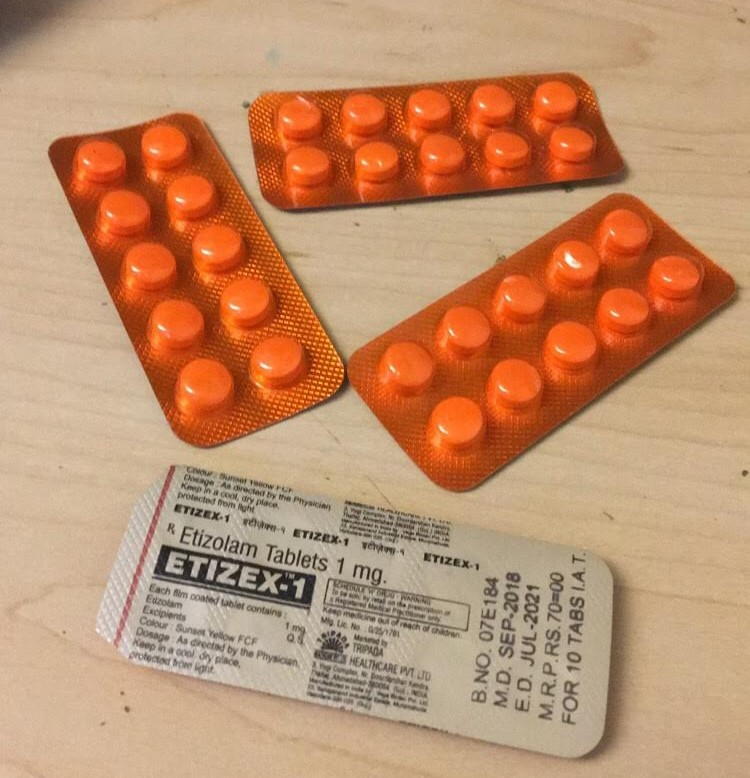
Etizex brand etizolam tablets

Etizolam is a thienodiazepine derivative which is a benzodiazepine analog. The etizolam molecule differs from a benzodiazepine in that the benzene ring has been replaced by a thiophene ring and triazole ring has been fused, making the drug a thienotriazolodiazepine.

Although a thienodiazepine, etizolam is clinically regarded as a benzodiazepine because of its mode of action via the benzodiazepine receptor and directly targeting GABA_{A} allosteric modulator receptors.

It possesses anxiolytic, amnesic, anticonvulsant, hypnotic, sedative and skeletal muscle relaxant properties.

It was patented in 1972 and first approved for medical use in Japan in 1984.

As of April 2021, the export of etizolam has been banned in India.

== Medical uses ==
- Short-term treatment of insomnia.
- Anxiety disorders such as OCD and generalized anxiety disorder, mostly as a short-term medication to be used purely on an at-need basis

== Side effects ==
Long term use may result in blepharospasms, especially in women. Doses of 4 mg or more may cause anterograde amnesia.

In rare cases, erythema annulare centrifugum skin lesions have resulted.

=== Tolerance, dependence and withdrawal ===
Abrupt or rapid discontinuation from etizolam, as with benzodiazepines, may result in the appearance of the benzodiazepine withdrawal syndrome, including rebound insomnia. Neuroleptic malignant syndrome, a rare event in benzodiazepine withdrawal, has been documented in a case of abrupt withdrawal from etizolam. This is particularly relevant given etizolam's short half-life relative to benzodiazepines such as diazepam resulting in a more rapid drug level decrease in blood plasma levels.

In a study that compared the effectiveness of etizolam, alprazolam, and bromazepam for the treatment of generalized anxiety disorder, all three drugs retained their effectiveness over 2 weeks, but etizolam became more effective from 2 weeks to 4 weeks. Administering .5 mg etizolam twice daily did not induce cognitive deficits over 3 weeks when compared to placebo.

When multiple doses of etizolam, or lorazepam, were administered to rat neurons, lorazepam caused downregulation of alpha-1 benzodiazepine binding sites (tolerance/dependence), while etizolam caused an increase in alpha-2 benzodiazepine binding sites (reverse tolerance to anti-anxiety effects). Tolerance to the anticonvulsant effects of lorazepam was observed, but no significant tolerance to the anticonvulsant effects of etizolam was observed. Etizolam therefore has a reduced liability to induce tolerance, and dependence, compared with classic benzodiazepines.

Etizolam may represent a possible anxiolytic of choice with reduced liability to produce tolerance and dependence after long-term treatment of anxiety and stress syndromes.

== Pharmacology ==
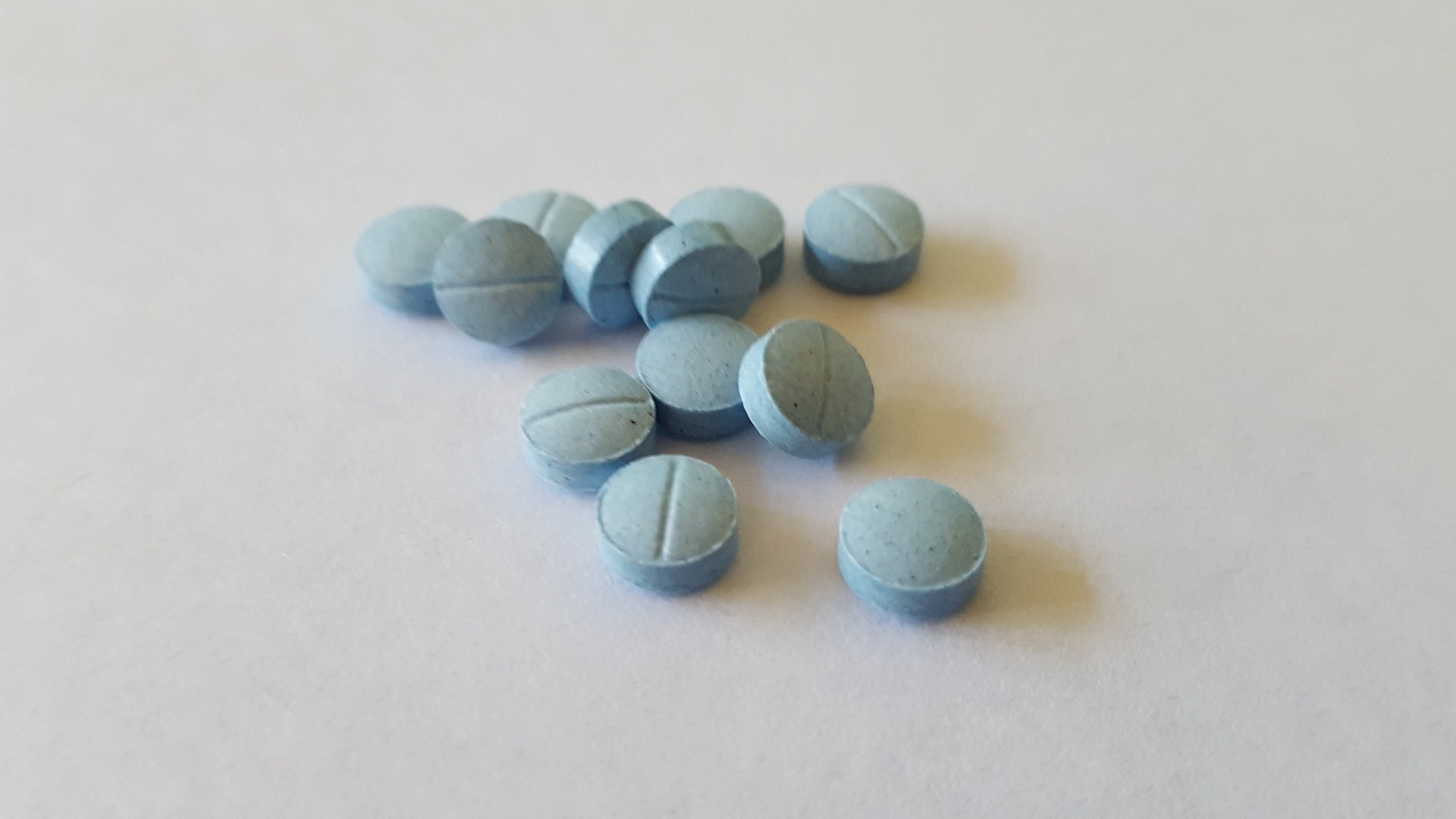
Etizolam pills

Etizolam, a thienodiazepine derivative, is absorbed fairly rapidly, with peak plasma levels achieved between 30 minutes and 2 hours. It has a mean elimination half-life of about 3.4 hours. Etizolam possesses potent hypnotic properties, and is comparable with other short-acting benzodiazepines. Etizolam acts as a positive allosteric modulator of the GABA_{A} receptor by agonizing the receptor's benzodiazepine site.

According to the Italian prescribing information sheet, etizolam belongs to a new class of diazepines, thienotriazolodiazepines. This new class is easily oxidized, rapidly metabolized, and has a lower risk of accumulation, even after prolonged treatment. Etizolam has an anxiolytic action about 6–8 times greater than that of diazepam. Etizolam produces, especially at higher dosages, a reduction in time taken to fall asleep, an increase in total sleep time, and a reduction in the number of awakenings. During tests, there were no substantial changes in deep sleep; however, it may reduce REM sleep. In EEG tests of healthy volunteers, etizolam showed some similar characteristics to tricyclic antidepressants.

Etizolam's main metabolites in humans are alpha-hydroxyetizolam and 8-hydroxyetizolam. alpha-Hydroxyetizolam is pharmacologically active and has a half-life of approximately 8.2 hours.

== Interactions ==
Itraconazole and fluvoxamine slow down the rate of elimination of etizolam, leading to accumulation of etizolam, therefore increasing its pharmacological effects. Carbamazepine speeds up the metabolism of etizolam, resulting in reduced pharmacological effects.

== Overdose ==
Cases of intentional suicide by overdose using etizolam in combination with GABA agonists have been reported. Etizolam has a lower LD_{50} than certain benzodiazepines. Flumazenil, a GABA antagonist agent used to reverse benzodiazepine overdoses, inhibits the effect of etizolam as well as classical benzodiazepines such as diazepam and chlordiazepoxide.

Etizolam overdose deaths are rising in Scotland, especially among women - for instance, the National Records of Scotland report on drug-related deaths have, "have increased significantly in Scotland in recent years, with a much greater percentage increase in deaths among women than among men". By 2018, 1,187 overdoses were officially recorded, a 107% increase from 2008, this means that this has been the highest peak to date. Although, men still outnumber women in drug-related deaths.

== Society and culture ==
=== Brand names ===
Etilaam, Sedekopan, Etizest, Etizex, Pasaden or Depas

=== Legal status ===
==== International drug control conventions ====
In 1990, it was recommended that etizolam not be placed under international control. However, this attitude has changed due to increased abuse. On 13 December 2019, the World Health Organization recommended etizolam be placed in Schedule 4 of the 1971 Convention on Psychotropic Substances. This recommendation was followed by the placement of Etizolam into Schedule IV in March 2020.

==== Australia ====
Etizolam is not used medically in Australia but has been found in counterfeit Xanax pills.

==== Denmark ====
Etizolam is controlled in Denmark under the Danish Misuse of Drugs Act.

==== Germany ====
Etizolam was controlled in Germany in July 2013 but is not used medically.

==== Italy ====
Etizolam is licensed for the treatment of anxiety, insomnia and anxiety disorders as a prescription-only medication.

==== India ====
In India, it is a Narcotics prescription-only (NRx) medication used for anxiety disorders, sometimes in combination with other drugs, i.e. the beta blocker propranolol.

United Kingdom

In the UK, etizolam has been classified as a Class C drug by the May 2017 amendment to The Misuse of Drugs Act 1971 along with several other designer benzodiazepine drugs.

==== United States ====
Etizolam is not authorized by the FDA for medical use in the US. As of March 2016, etizolam is a controlled substance in the following states: Alabama, Arkansas, Florida, Georgia (as Schedule I), Louisiana, Mississippi, Texas, South Carolina, and Virginia. It is controlled in Indiana as of 1 July 2017. It is controlled in Ohio as of February 2018.

On 23 December 2022, the DEA announced it had begun consideration on the matter of placing etizolam under temporary Schedule I status.

Later on 25 July 2023, the DEA published a pre-print notice that etizolam would become temporarily scheduled as a Schedule I controlled substance from 26 July 2023 to 26 July 2025. On 25 July 2025, and effective the following day, the DEA extended the temporary scheduling until 26 July 2026.

Effective 1 April 2026, etizolam is permanently in Schedule I under the Controlled Substances Act.

=== Misuse ===
Etizolam is a drug of potential misuse. Cases of etizolam dependence have been documented in the medical literature. Since 1991, cases of etizolam misuse and addiction have substantially increased, due to varying levels of accessibility and cultural popularity. Pills being sold as Xanax or other benzodiazepines that are illicitly manufactured may often contain etizolam rather than their listed ingredient

== See also ==
- Alprazolam
- Brotizolam
- Clotiazepam
- Deschloroetizolam
- Fluetizolam
- Metizolam
- Benzodiazepine dependence
- Benzodiazepine withdrawal syndrome
- Long-term effects of benzodiazepines
