= Brotizolam =

Thienotriazolodiazepine drug

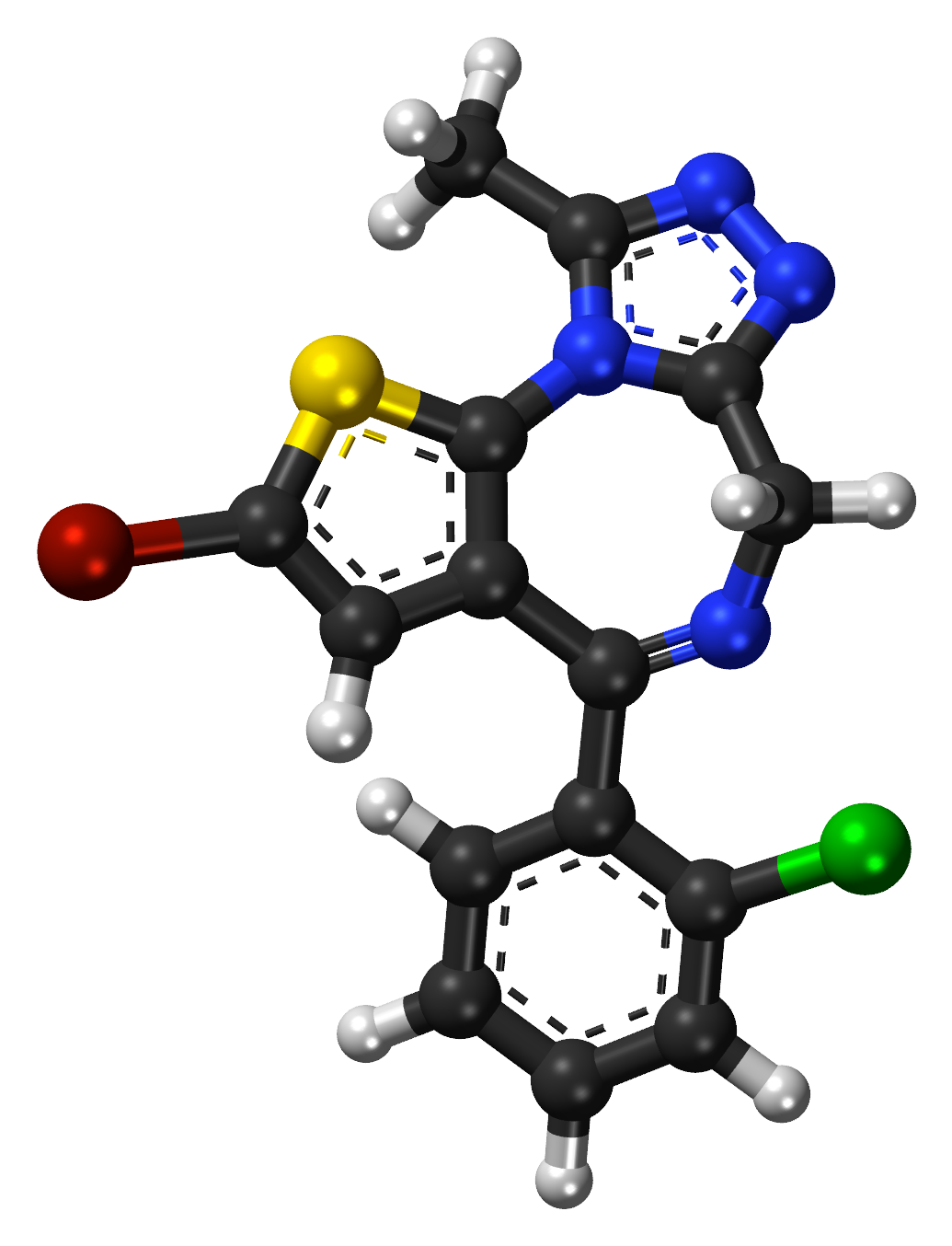

Clinical data
- Trade names: Lendormin, others
- AHFS/Drugs.com: International Drug Names
- Routes of administration: Oral
- ATC code: N05CD09 (WHO)

Legal status
- Legal status: BR: Class B1 (Psychoactive drugs); CA: Schedule IV; DE: Prescription only (Anlage III for higher doses); UK: Class C; US: Unscheduled; UN: Schedule IV

Pharmacokinetic data
- Bioavailability: 48–95%
- Metabolism: Hepatic
- Elimination half-life: 4.4 hours (range, 2.6–6.9 h)
- Excretion: Renal

Identifiers
- IUPAC name: 2-Bromo-4-(2-chlorophenyl)-9-methyl-6H-thieno[3,2-f][1,2,4]triazolo[4,3-a][1,4]diazepine
- CAS Number: 57801-81-7
- PubChem CID: 2451
- DrugBank: DB09017
- ChemSpider: 2357
- UNII: 5XZM1R3DKF
- KEGG: D01744
- ChEBI: CHEBI:31308
- ChEMBL: ChEMBL32479
- CompTox Dashboard (EPA): DTXSID0022692
- ECHA InfoCard: 100.055.404

Chemical and physical data
- Formula: C_{15}H_{10}BrClN_{4}S
- Molar mass: 393.69 g·mol^{−1}
- 3D model (JSmol): Interactive image
- SMILES: ClC1=CC=CC=C1C2=NCC3=NN=C(C)N3C4=C2C=C(Br)S4
- InChI: InChI=1S/C15H10BrClN4S/c1-8-19-20-13-7-18-14(9-4-2-3-5-11(9)17)10-6-12(16)22-15(10)21(8)13/h2-6H,7H2,1H3; Key:UMSGKTJDUHERQW-UHFFFAOYSA-N

Brotizolam, sold under the brand name Lendormin, among others, is a sedative–hypnotic thienotriazolodiazepine drug, which is a benzodiazepine analog. It possesses anxiolytic, anticonvulsant, hypnotic, sedative, and skeletal muscle relaxant properties, and is considered to be similar in effect to other short-acting hypnotic benzodiazepines such as triazolam or midazolam. It is used in the short-term treatment of severe insomnia. Brotizolam is a highly potent and short-acting hypnotic, with a typical dose ranging from 0.125 to 0.25 milligrams, which is rapidly eliminated with an average half-life of 4.4 hours (range 3.6–7.9 hours).

It was patented in 1974 and came into medical use in 1984. Brotizolam is not approved for sale in the UK, United States or Canada. It is approved for sale in the Netherlands, Germany, Spain, Belgium, Luxembourg, Austria, Portugal, Israel, Italy, Taiwan, and Japan.

== Medical uses ==
Brotizolam is prescribed for the short-term treatment (2–4 weeks) of severe or debilitating insomnia. Brotizolam is a short-acting benzodiazepine and is sometimes used in patients who have difficulty in maintaining sleep or getting to sleep. Hypnotics should only be used on a short-term basis or in those with chronic insomnia on an occasional basis.

Brotizolam, in a dose of 0.25 mg, can be used as a premedication prior to surgery. This dose was found to be comparable in efficacy to 2 mg flunitrazepam as a premedicant prior to surgery.

== Side effects ==
Common side effects of brotizolam are typical of hypnotic benzodiazepines, are related to CNS depression, and can include somnolence, ataxia, headache, anterograde amnesia, dizziness, fatigue, impairment of motor functions, slurred speech, confusion, and clumsiness.

Less common side effects include hypotension, respiratory depression, hallucinations, nausea and vomiting, palpitations, and paradoxical reactions (i.e. aggression, anxiety, violent behavior, etc.).

Brotizolam can cause residual side effects the next day, such as impaired cognitive and motor functions as well as drowsiness. Disruption of sleep patterns may also occur, such as suppression of REM sleep. These side effects are more likely at higher doses (above 0.5–1 mg).

In clinical trials, brotizolam 0.125 to 0.5 mg improved sleep in insomniacs similarly to nitrazepam 2.5 and 5 mg, flunitrazepam 2 mg and triazolam 0.25 mg, whilst brotizolam 0.5 mg was shown to be superior to flurazepam 30 mg, but inferior to temazepam 30 mg in some studies. Brotizolam at dosages below 0.5 mg at night usually produced minimal morning drowsiness. No residual impairment of psychomotor performance occurs following dosages within the recommended range of 0.125 to 0.25 mg. No serious side effects have been reported to date and the most frequently observed adverse experiences are drowsiness, headache and dizziness. Mild rebound insomnia may occur in some patients when treatment is stopped.

== Contraindications ==
Thienodiazepines and benzodiazepines require special precaution if used in the elderly, during pregnancy, in children, alcohol or drug-dependent individuals and individuals with comorbid psychiatric disorders.

== Pharmacology ==
Brotizolam has been shown in animal studies to be a very high potency thienodiazepine. The elimination half-life of brotizolam is 3–6 hours. It is absorbed rapidly after administration into active metabolites. One of which is far less potent than brotizolam and the other is only present in very small amounts in the blood. Thus the metabolites of brotizolam do not have significant pharmacological effect in humans. Brotizolam induces impairment of motor function and has hypnotic properties.

Brotizolam increases the slow wave light sleep (SWLS) in a dose-dependent manner whilst suppressing deep sleep stages. Less time is spent in stages 3 and 4, which are the deep sleep stages, when GABAergics such as brotizolam are used. Benzodiazepines and thienodiazepines are therefore not ideal hypnotics in the treatment of insomnia. The suppression of deep sleep stages may be especially problematic in the elderly, as they naturally spend less time in the deep sleep stage.

== Society and culture ==
=== Abuse ===
Abuse of brotizolam, although not widespread, was a problem in Hong Kong in the late 1980s and early 1990s. To control benzodiazepine abuse in Hong Kong, the Government's Pharmacy and Poisons Board reclassified benzodiazepines as Dangerous Drugs in October 1990. Alongside formal prescriptions, detailed records were required for the supply and dispensing of these drugs. These regulations were applied initially only to brotizolam, triazolam and flunitrazepam, as they were the major benzodiazepines being abused. Following these regulations, the sales of flunitrazepam and triazolam fell in 1991, but the sales of five unrestricted benzodiazepines increased. Particular problems then arose with the trafficking and abuse of nimetazepam and the abuse of temazepam. The regulations were then extended to include all benzodiazepines by January 1992. This appears to have curbed, at least partially, their abuse in Hong Kong. There are still some problems with temazepam, nimetazepam, triazolam, and brotizolam, but they are not major.

=== Brand names ===
Name	Countries
Bondormin, Brotizolam	Israel
Dormex	Chile
Lendorm	Austria, Denmark
Lendormin	South Africa, Belgium, Germany, Hungary, Italy, Japan, Netherlands, Portugal, Taiwan
Lendormine	Switzerland
Lindormin	Mexico
Noctilan	Chile
Sintonal	Spain

== See also ==
- Benzodiazepine dependence
- Benzodiazepine withdrawal syndrome
- Bromazepam
- Bromazolam
- Loprazolam
- Flubrotizolam
- Fluclotizolam
