= Clonazafone desglycyl =

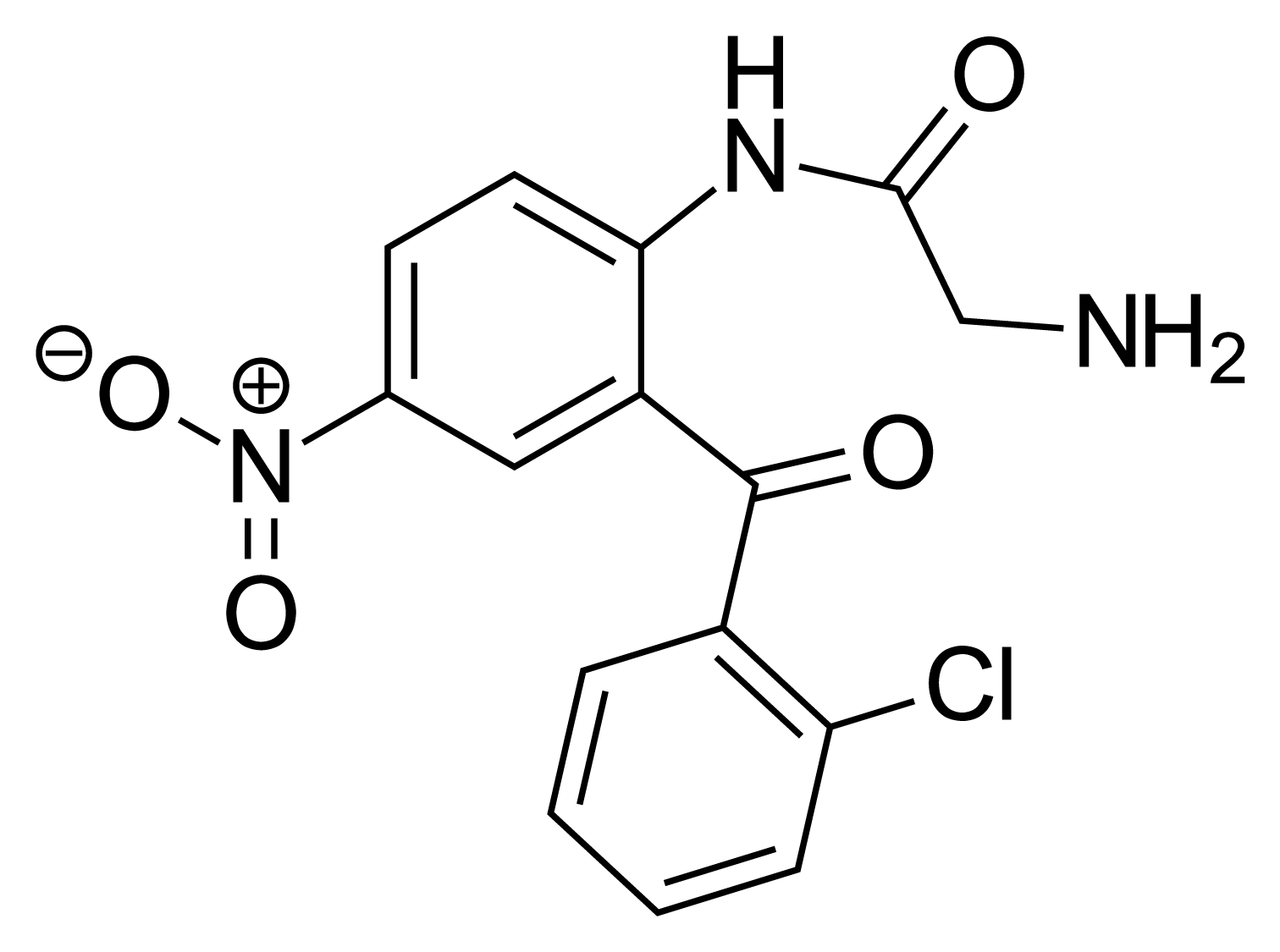

Identifiers
- IUPAC name: 2-amino-N-[2-(2-chlorobenzoyl)-4-nitrophenyl]acetamide
- CAS Number: 17714-02-2
- PubChem CID: 3023245
- CompTox Dashboard (EPA): DTXSID10388568

Chemical and physical data
- Formula: C_{15}H_{12}ClN_{3}O_{4}
- Molar mass: 333.73 g·mol^{−1}
- 3D model (JSmol): Interactive image
- SMILES: C1=CC=C(C(=C1)C(=O)C2=C(C=CC(=C2)[N+](=O)[O-])NC(=O)CN)Cl
- InChI: InChI=1S/C15H12ClN3O4/c16-12-4-2-1-3-10(12)15(21)11-7-9(19(22)23)5-6-13(11)18-14(20)8-17/h1-7H,8,17H2,(H,18,20); Key:VDWHFAAXPZFFEI-UHFFFAOYSA-N

Clonazafone desglycyl (AC1Miehr) is a chemical compound that can act as both a prodrug and a synthetic precursor for the benzodiazepine derivative clonazepam. It has been detected as a designer drug, first being identified in Germany in September 2024.

== See also ==
- Alprazolam triazolobenzophenone
- Avizafone
- Diclazafone desglycyl
- Noravizafone desglycyl
- Rilmazafone
