= C15H10BrClN2O =

The molecular formula C_{15}H_{10}BrClN_{2}O may refer to:

- 2′-Bromonordazepam
- Phenazepam
