= Noravizafone desglycyl =

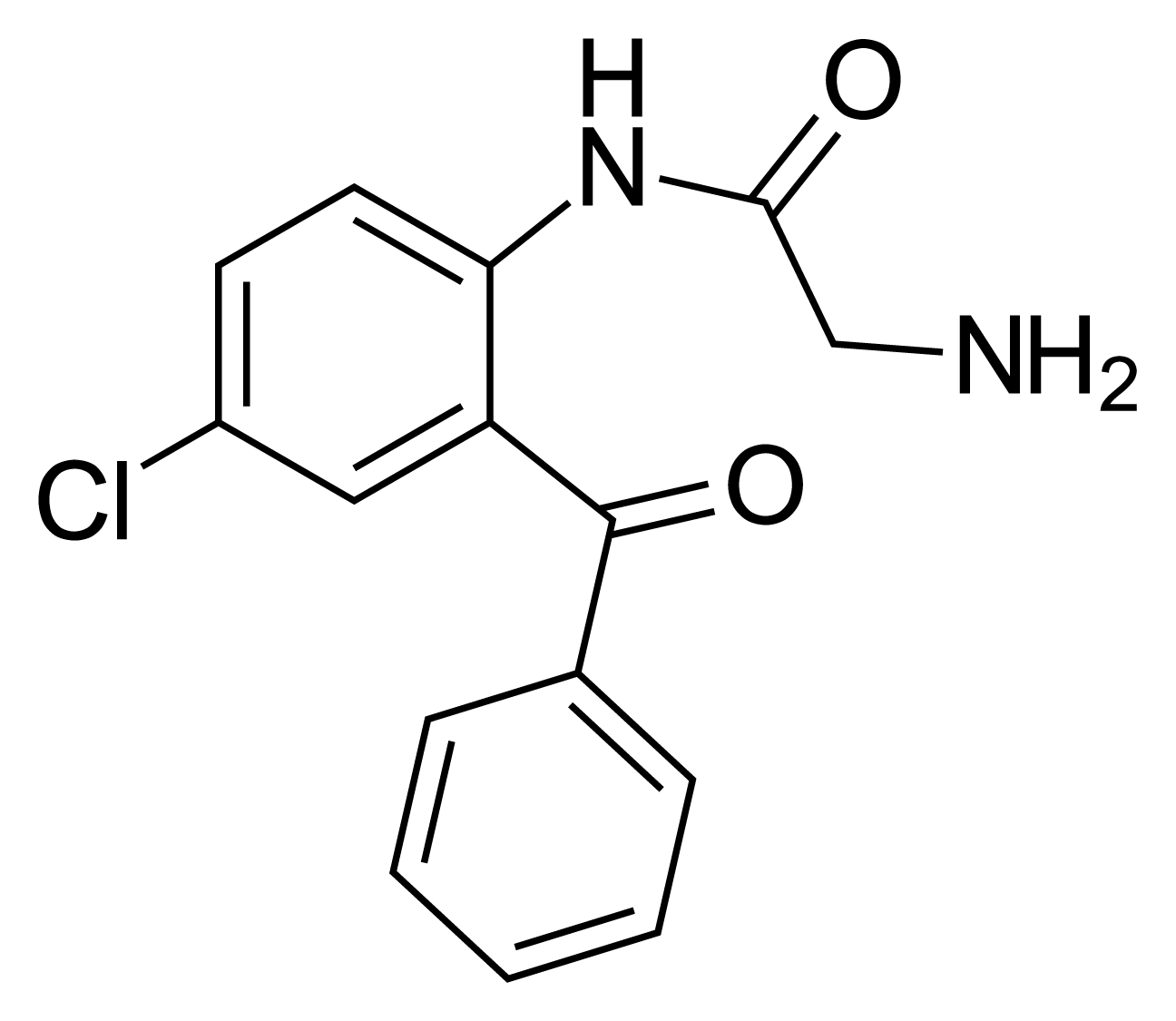

Identifiers
- IUPAC name: 2-amino-N-(2-benzoyl-4-chlorophenyl)acetamide
- CAS Number: 5504-71-2
- PubChem CID: 3014364
- ChemSpider: 2282840
- ChEMBL: ChEMBL3277553
- CompTox Dashboard (EPA): DTXSID50203589

Chemical and physical data
- Formula: C_{15}H_{13}ClN_{2}O_{2}
- Molar mass: 288.73 g·mol^{−1}
- 3D model (JSmol): Interactive image
- SMILES: C1=CC=C(C=C1)C(=O)C2=C(C=CC(=C2)Cl)NC(=O)CN
- InChI: InChI=1S/C15H13ClN2O2/c16-11-6-7-13(18-14(19)9-17)12(8-11)15(20)10-4-2-1-3-5-10/h1-8H,9,17H2,(H,18,19); Key:GIBRATRQHFFRHE-UHFFFAOYSA-N

Noravizafone desglycyl is a chemical compound that can act as both a prodrug and a synthetic precursor for the benzodiazepine derivative nordiazepam, as well as forming as a breakdown product of nordiazepam during storage under certain conditions. It is inactive in vitro but has similar effects to nordiazepam in vivo due to metabolic conversion to the active benzodiazepine form. It has been detected as a designer drug, first being identified in Germany in September 2024.

== See also ==
- Alprazolam triazolobenzophenone
- Avizafone
- Diclazafone desglycyl
- Rilmazafone
