= Ro07-3953 =

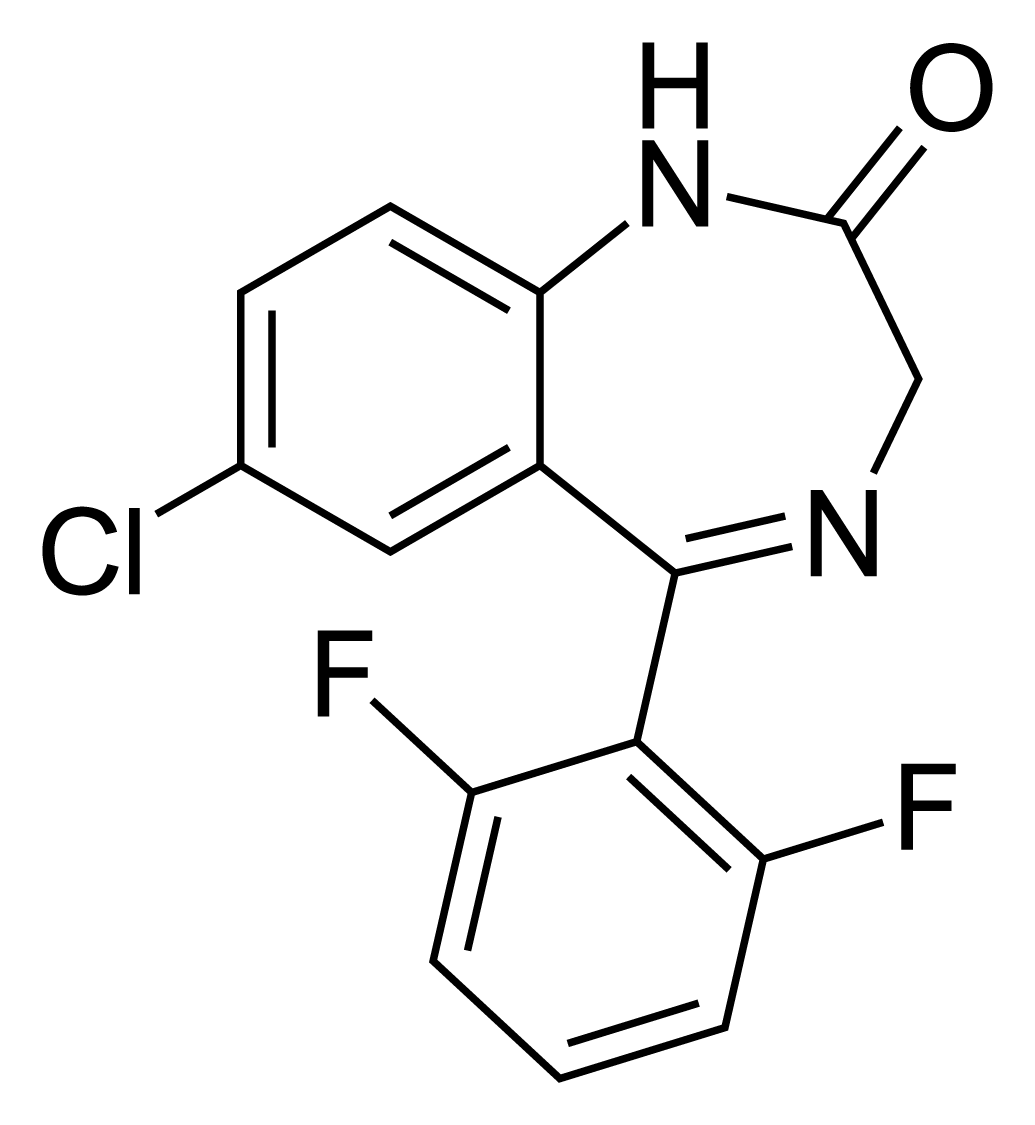

Legal status
- Legal status: CA: Schedule IV; DE: NpSG (Industrial and scientific use only); UK: Under Psychoactive Substances Act

Identifiers
- IUPAC name: 7-chloro-5-(2,6-difluorophenyl)-1H-benzo[e][1,4]diazepin-2(3H)-one
- CAS Number: 28910-86-3
- PubChem CID: 23275763
- ChemSpider: 10441869
- ChEMBL: ChEMBL151574
- CompTox Dashboard (EPA): DTXSID10877922

Chemical and physical data
- Formula: C_{15}H_{91}ClF_{2}N_{2}O
- Molar mass: 389.35 g·mol^{−1}
- 3D model (JSmol): Interactive image
- SMILES: C1C(=O)NC2=C(C=C(C=C2)Cl)C(=N1)C3=C(C=CC=C3F)F
- InChI: InChI=1S/C15H9ClF2N2O/c16-8-4-5-12-9(6-8)15(19-7-13(21)20-12)14-10(17)2-1-3-11(14)18/h1-6H,7H2,(H,20,21); Key:WENMWXYJTWETRE-UHFFFAOYSA-N

Ro07-3953 (Diflunordazepam) is a benzodiazepine derivative which is the 2',6'-difluoro derivative of nordazepam. It was invented in the 1970s but was never marketed, however it has recently appeared on the market as a designer drug, first reported in Sweden in December 2024.

== See also ==
- Difludiazepam
- Flubromazepam
