= Ro20-8065 =

Chemical compound

Legal status
- Legal status: CA: Schedule IV; DE: NpSG (Industrial and scientific use only); UK: Under Psychoactive Substances Act

Identifiers
- IUPAC name: 7,8-dichloro-5-(2-fluorophenyl)-1,3-dihydro-1,4-benzodiazepin-2-one
- CAS Number: 88695-06-1
- PubChem CID: 10358803
- ChemSpider: 8534252
- ChEMBL: ChEMBL443823
- CompTox Dashboard (EPA): DTXSID50877921

Chemical and physical data
- Formula: C_{15}H_{9}Cl_{2}FN_{2}O
- Molar mass: 323.15 g·mol^{−1}
- 3D model (JSmol): Interactive image
- SMILES: C1C(=O)NC2=CC(=C(C=C2C(=N1)C3=CC=CC=C3F)Cl)Cl
- InChI: InChI=1S/C15H9Cl2FN2O/c16-10-5-9-13(6-11(10)17)20-14(21)7-19-15(9)8-3-1-2-4-12(8)18/h1-6H,7H2,(H,20,21); Key:XINLNKMOSCQFJB-UHFFFAOYSA-N

Ro20-8065 (8-Chloronorflurazepam) is a benzodiazepine derivative with anticonvulsant and muscle relaxant effects, which has been sold as a designer drug.

== See also ==
- Fludiazepam
- Norflurazepam
- Ro07-5220
- Ro20-8552
