= Nalobrazepam =

Benzodiazepine medication

Clinical data
- Trade names: Levana
- Other names: Cinazepam; BD-798; BD798
- ATC code: None

Identifiers
- IUPAC name: 4-{[7-Bromo-5-(2-chlorophenyl)-2-oxo-2,3-dihydro-1H-1,4-benzodiazepin-3-yl]oxy}-4-oxobutanoic acid
- CAS Number: 172986-25-3
- PubChem CID: 629281
- ChemSpider: 546502
- UNII: U4SS7UFXC7
- CompTox Dashboard (EPA): DTXSID201031961

Chemical and physical data
- Formula: C_{19}H_{14}BrClN_{2}O_{5}
- Molar mass: 465.68 g·mol^{−1}
- 3D model (JSmol): Interactive image
- SMILES: c1ccc(c(c1)C2=NC(C(=O)Nc3c2cc(cc3)Br)OC(=O)CCC(=O)O)Cl
- InChI: InChI=1S/C19H14BrClN2O5/c20-10-5-6-14-12(9-10)17(11-3-1-2-4-13(11)21)23-19(18(27)22-14)28-16(26)8-7-15(24)25/h1-6,9,19H,7-8H2,(H,22,27)(H,24,25); Key:NQTRBZXDWMDXAQ-UHFFFAOYSA-N

Nalobrazepam (INN), also known as cinazepam or BD-798 and sold under the brand name Levana in Ukraine, is an atypical benzodiazepine derivative.

It produces pronounced hypnotic, sedative, and anxiolytic effects with minimal myorelaxant side effects. In addition, unlike many other benzodiazepine and nonbenzodiazepine hypnotics such as diazepam, flunitrazepam, and zopiclone, cinazepam does not disrupt sleep architecture, and the continuity of slow-wave sleep and REM sleep are proportionally increased. As such, cinazepam produces a sleep state close to physiological, and for that reason, may be advantageous compared to other, related drugs in the treatment of insomnia and other sleep disorders.

Cinazepam has an order of magnitude lower affinity for the benzodiazepine receptor of the GABA_{A} complex relative to other well-known hypnotic benzodiazepines such as nitrazepam and phenazepam. Moreover, in mice, it is rapidly metabolized, with only 5% of the base compound remaining within 30 minutes of administration. As such, cinazepam is considered to be a benzodiazepine prodrug; specifically, to 3-hydroxyphenazepam, as the main active metabolite.

== Synthesis ==
Patents: Compound #6:

The reaction between 2-amino-5-bromo-2'-chlorobenzophenone [60773-49-1] (1) and bromoacetyl bromide [598-21-0] gives 5-bromo-2'-chloro-2-bromoacetamido-benzophenone, PC33695403 (2). Finkelstein reaction with sodium iodide gives PC11375008 (3). Reaction with hydroxylamine preferentially causes alkylation by displacement of the leaving group than oxime formation. Hence, the product of this step is PC129780422 (4). Ring closure in acid led to Phenazepam 4-Oxide [1177751-52-8] (5). Treatment with acetic anhydride and Polonovski rearrangement gave PC630731 (6). Saponification of the ester yielded 3-Hydroxyphenazepam [70030-11-4] (7). Treatment with succinic anhydride completed the synthesis of Cinazepam (8).

== See also ==
- Gidazepam
- Cloxazolam
