= Fludiazepam =

Chemical compound

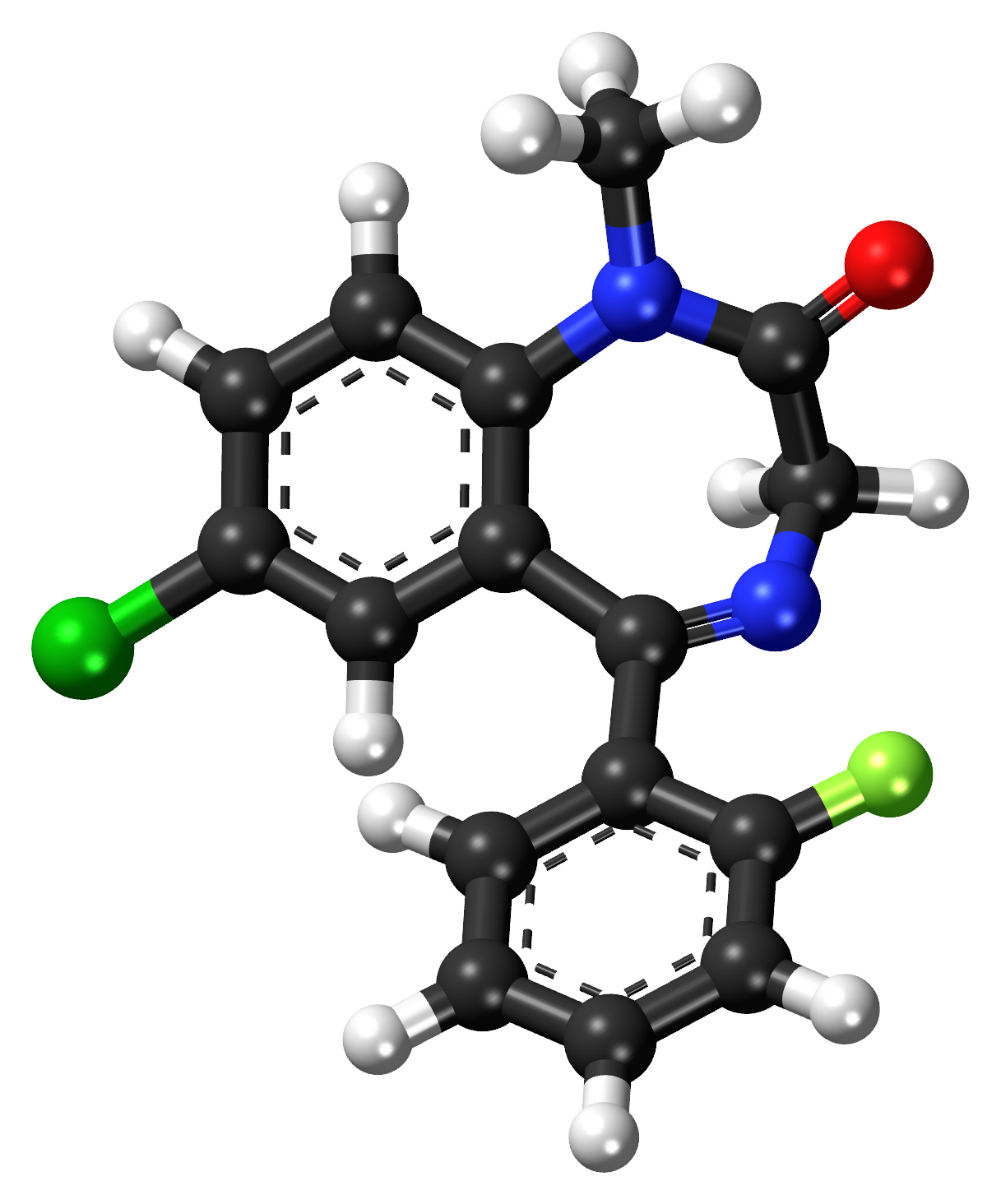

Clinical data
- Trade names: Erispan (JP, TW)
- AHFS/Drugs.com: International Drug Names
- Routes of administration: Oral (tablets)
- Drug class: Benzodiazepine
- ATC code: N05BA17 (WHO)

Legal status
- Legal status: BR: Class B1 (Psychoactive drugs); CA: Schedule IV; DE: Anlage III (Special prescription form required); US: Schedule IV

Pharmacokinetic data
- Metabolism: Hepatic
- Excretion: Renal

Identifiers
- IUPAC name: 7-chloro-5-(2-fluorophenyl)-1-methyl-1,3-dihydro-2H-1,4-benzodiazepin-2-one
- CAS Number: 3900-31-0
- PubChem CID: 3369
- DrugBank: DB01567
- ChemSpider: 3252
- UNII: 7F64A2K16Z
- KEGG: D01354
- ChEBI: CHEBI:31618
- ChEMBL: ChEMBL13291
- CompTox Dashboard (EPA): DTXSID00192277
- ECHA InfoCard: 100.292.343

Chemical and physical data
- Formula: C_{16}H_{12}ClFN_{2}O
- Molar mass: 302.73 g·mol^{−1}
- 3D model (JSmol): Interactive image
- SMILES: O=C1CN=C(C2=CC=CC=C2F)C3=CC(Cl)=CC=C3N1C
- InChI: InChI=1S/C16H12ClFN2O/c1-20-14-7-6-10(17)8-12(14)16(19-9-15(20)21)11-4-2-3-5-13(11)18/h2-8H,9H2,1H3; Key:ROYOYTLGDLIGBX-UHFFFAOYSA-N

Fludiazepam, marketed under the brand name Erispan (エリスパン) is a potent benzodiazepine and 2ʹ-fluoro derivative of diazepam, originally developed by Hoffmann-La Roche in the 1960s. It is marketed in Japan and Taiwan. It exerts its pharmacological properties via enhancement of GABAergic inhibition. Fludiazepam has 4 times more binding affinity for benzodiazepine receptors than diazepam. It possesses anxiolytic, anticonvulsant, sedative, hypnotic and skeletal muscle relaxant properties. Fludiazepam has been used recreationally.

== See also ==
- 2′-Bromonordazepam
- Diazepam
- Diclazepam (the 2ʹ-chloro analog)
- Difludiazepam (the 2',6'-difluoro derivative)
- Flunitrazepam (the 7-nitro analog)
- Flualprazolam (the triazolo derivative)
- Flutemazepam (the 3-hydroxy analog)
- Ro20-8552
