= C15H11BrN2O =

The molecular formula C_{15}H_{11}BrN_{2}O (molar mass: 315.17 g/mol) may refer to:

- Bromonordiazepam
- Mebroqualone
