= 3-Hydroxydesalkylgidazepam =

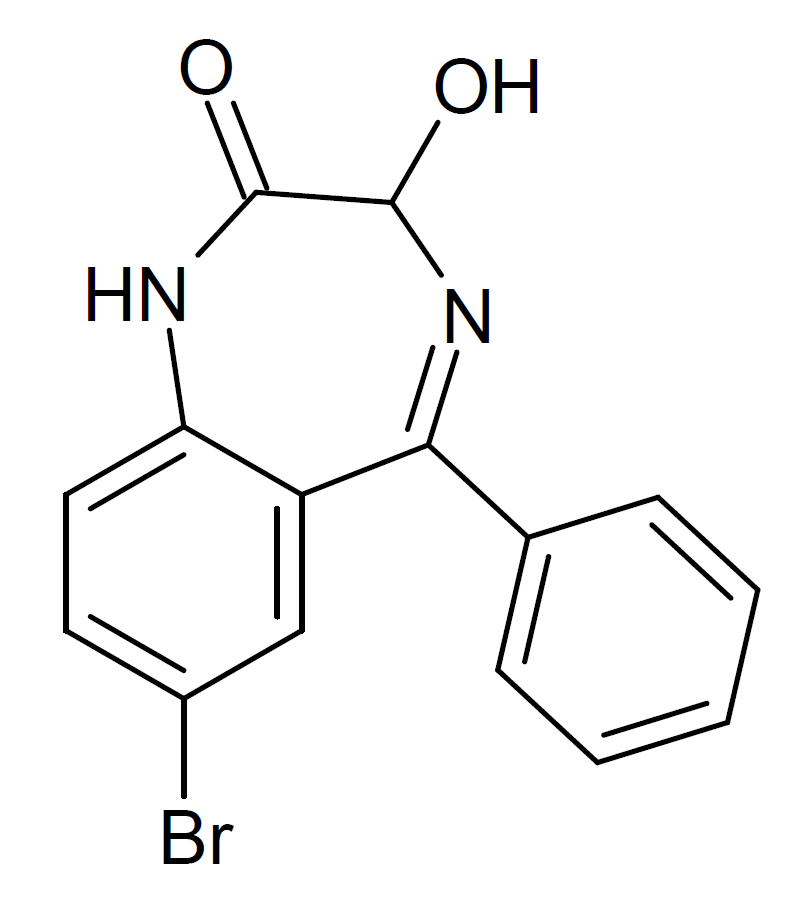

Identifiers
- IUPAC name: 7-Bromo-3-hydroxy-5-phenyl-1,3-dihydro-2H-1,4-benzodiazepin-2-one
- CAS Number: 37891-18-2
- PubChem CID: 627325

Chemical and physical data
- Formula: C_{15}H_{11}BrN_{2}O_{2}
- Molar mass: 331.169 g·mol^{−1}
- 3D model (JSmol): Interactive image
- SMILES: C1=CC=C(C=C1)C2=NC(C(=O)NC3=C2C=C(C=C3)Br)O
- InChI: InChI=1S/C15H11BrN2O2/c16-10-6-7-12-11(8-10)13(9-4-2-1-3-5-9)18-15(20)14(19)17-12/h1-8,15,20H,(H,17,19); Key:POAUVEHBXZCMCD-UHFFFAOYSA-N

3-Hydroxydesalkylgidazepam is a benzodiazepine derivative which has been sold as a designer drug, first reported in Ireland in 2025. It is closely related to the pharmaceutical benzodiazepine oxazepam but with the chloro substitution replaced by bromo, and has similar hypnotic, sedative, anticonvulsant, and anxiolytic actions. It is also a metabolite of the Russian benzodiazepine gidazepam. Various derivatives substituted on the OH group are known which act as prodrugs for 3-hydroxydesalkylgidazepam and related compounds.

== See also ==
- Bromonordiazepam
- Flutemazepam
- Lorazepam
- Nitemazepam
- Oxazepam hemisuccinate
- Temazepam
