= Avizafone =

Diazepam prodrug

Clinical data
- Routes of administration: Intramuscular injection
- ATC code: none

Identifiers
- IUPAC name: (2S)-2,6-diamino-N-{[(2-benzoyl-4-chlorophenyl)methylcarbamoyl]methyl}hexanamide
- CAS Number: 65617-86-9
- PubChem CID: 71968
- ChemSpider: 64974
- UNII: 65NK71K78P
- ChEMBL: ChEMBL2103985
- CompTox Dashboard (EPA): DTXSID90215868

Chemical and physical data
- Formula: C_{22}H_{27}ClN_{4}O_{3}
- Molar mass: 430.93 g·mol^{−1}
- 3D model (JSmol): Interactive image
- SMILES: Clc1cc(c(N(C(=O)CNC(=O)[C@@H](N)CCCCN)C)cc1)C(=O)c2ccccc2
- InChI: InChI=1S/C22H27ClN4O3/c1-27(20(28)14-26-22(30)18(25)9-5-6-12-24)19-11-10-16(23)13-17(19)21(29)15-7-3-2-4-8-15/h2-4,7-8,10-11,13,18H,5-6,9,12,14,24-25H2,1H3,(H,26,30)/t18-/m0/s1; Key:LTKOVYBBGBGKTA-SFHVURJKSA-N

Avizafone (Pro-Diazepam) is a water-soluble prodrug of the benzodiazepine derivative diazepam. It can be administered intramuscularly.

Avizafone is metabolised by enzymes in the blood to form the active drug diazepam. It has been researched as an alternative to diazepam as an antidote to poisoning with organophosphate nerve agents.

== See also ==
- Alprazolam triazolobenzophenone
- Clonazafone desglycyl
- Diclazafone desglycyl
- Noravizafone desglycyl
- Rilmazafone
