= Gidazepam =

Benzodiazepine medication

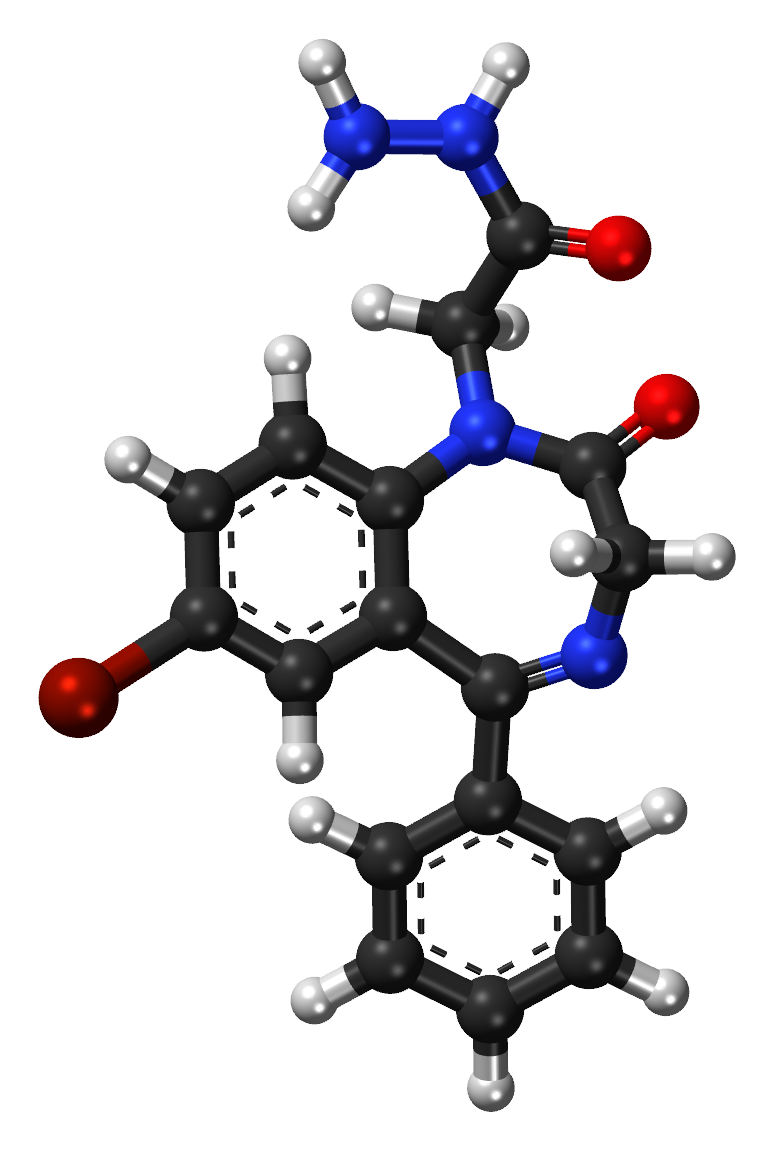

Clinical data
- Trade names: Gidazepam IC
- Routes of administration: Oral

Legal status
- Legal status: CA: Schedule IV; US: Unscheduled; (UA): Rx-Only

Pharmacokinetic data
- Metabolism: Hepatic
- Elimination half-life: ~87 hours
- Excretion: Renal

Identifiers
- IUPAC name: 2-(9-Bromo-3-oxo-6-phenyl-2,5-diazabicyclo[5.4.0]undeca-5,8,10,12-tetraen-2-yl)acetohydrazide
- CAS Number: 129186-29-4
- PubChem CID: 121919
- DrugBank: ?
- ChemSpider: 108764
- UNII: XMJ87I93Y9
- CompTox Dashboard (EPA): DTXSID00156091

Chemical and physical data
- Formula: C_{17}H_{15}BrN_{4}O_{2}
- Molar mass: 387.237 g·mol^{−1}
- 3D model (JSmol): Interactive image
- SMILES: BrC1=CC2=C(C=C1)N(CC(NN)=O)C(CN=C2C3=CC=CC=C3)=O
- InChI: InChI=1S/C17H15BrN4O2/c18-12-6-7-14-13(8-12)17(11-4-2-1-3-5-11)20-9-16(24)22(14)10-15(23)21-19/h1-8H,9-10,19H2,(H,21,23); Key:XLGCMZLSEXRBSG-UHFFFAOYSA-N

Gidazepam, also known as hydazepam or hidazepam, is a drug which is an atypical benzodiazepine derivative, developed in the Soviet Union. It is a selectively anxiolytic benzodiazepine. It also has therapeutic value in the management of certain cardiovascular disorders.

== Pharmacology ==
Gidazepam active metabolite (desalkylgidazepam or bromonordiazepam), responsible for its therapeutic effects

Gidazepam and several of its analogs, in contrast to other benzodiazepines, are comparatively more selective agonists of TSPO (formerly the peripheral benzodiazepine receptor) than the benzodiazepine receptor.

Gidazepam acts as a prodrug to its active metabolite 7-bromo-2,3-dihydro-5-phenyl-1H-1,4-benzodiazepin-2-one (desalkylgidazepam or bromo-nordazepam). Its anxiolytic effects can take several hours to manifest presumably due to its slow metabolism (half-life 87 hours). The onset and intensity of anxiolytic effects correlate with blood levels of desalkylgidazepam.

== Synthesis ==
Gidazepam is synthesised in two stages. The first involves N-alkylation of 7-bromo-5-phenyl-1,2-dihydro-3H-1,4-benzodiazepin-2-one with methyl bromoacetate in chloroform, using potassium hydroxide, potassium carbonate, and a phase-transfer catalyst to obtain the corresponding methyl ester. The ester is then converted to the hydrazide by treatment with hydrazine hydrate in ethanol at 65 °C. The product precipitates upon cooling and is isolated by filtration and purified by recrystallisation from ethanol.

== See also ==
- Phenazepam—another benzodiazepine widely used in Russia and other CIS countries
- Cinazepam
- Cloxazolam
- List of Russian drugs
