= Difludiazepam =

Chemical compound

Legal status
- Legal status: CA: Schedule IV; DE: NpSG (Industrial and scientific use only); UK: Under Psychoactive Substances Act

Identifiers
- IUPAC name: 7-chloro-5-(2,6-difluorophenyl)-1-methyl-1H-benzo[e][1,4]diazepin-2(3H)-one
- CAS Number: 39080-67-6
- PubChem CID: 44366236
- ChemSpider: 23222150
- UNII: 7N3B9XEC7B
- ChEMBL: ChEMBL346673
- CompTox Dashboard (EPA): DTXSID001135292

Chemical and physical data
- Formula: C_{16}H_{11}ClF_{2}N_{2}O
- Molar mass: 320.72 g·mol^{−1}
- 3D model (JSmol): Interactive image
- SMILES: Fc3cccc(F)c3C2=NCC(=O)N(C)c1ccc(Cl)cc12
- InChI: InChI=1S/C16H11ClF2N2O/c1-21-13-6-5-9(17)7-10(13)16(20-8-14(21)22)15-11(18)3-2-4-12(15)19/h2-7H,8H2,1H3; Key:DUNFPASORLTEGN-UHFFFAOYSA-N

Difludiazepam (Ro07-4065) is a benzodiazepine derivative which is the 2',6'-difluoro derivative of fludiazepam. It was invented in the 1970s but was never marketed, and has been used as a research tool to help determine the shape and function of the GABA_{A} receptors, at which it has an IC_{50} of 4.1nM. Difludiazepam has subsequently been sold as a designer drug, and was first notified to the EMCDDA by Swedish authorities in 2017.

== See also ==
- Diclazepam
- Flubromazepam
- Ro07-3953
- Ro07-5220
- SH-I-048A
