= Ro07-5220 =

Chemical compound

Legal status
- Legal status: CA: Schedule IV; DE: NpSG (Industrial and scientific use only); UK: Under Psychoactive Substances Act

Identifiers
- IUPAC name: 7-chloro-5-(2,6-dichlorophenyl)-1-methyl-3H-1,4-benzodiazepin-2-one
- CAS Number: 30144-88-8
- PubChem CID: 9975396
- ChemSpider: 8150988
- ChEMBL: ChEMBL9689
- CompTox Dashboard (EPA): DTXSID40877930

Chemical and physical data
- Formula: C_{16}H_{11}Cl_{3}N_{2}O
- Molar mass: 353.63 g·mol^{−1}
- 3D model (JSmol): Interactive image
- SMILES: CN1C(=O)CN=C(C2=C1C=CC(=C2)Cl)C3=C(C=CC=C3Cl)Cl
- InChI: InChI=1S/C16H11Cl3N2O/c1-21-13-6-5-9(17)7-10(13)16(20-8-14(21)22)15-11(18)3-2-4-12(15)19/h2-7H,8H2,1H3; Key:OTQXKRRISJPTFS-UHFFFAOYSA-N

Ro07-5220 (6'-chlorodiclazepam) is a benzodiazepine derivative with sedative, anxiolytic, anticonvulsant and muscle relaxant effects, which has been sold as a designer drug.

== See also ==
- Diclazepam
- Difludiazepam
- Ro20-8065
