= Ro07-9749 =

Chemical compound

Identifiers
- IUPAC name: 5-(2-fluorophenyl)-7-iodo-1,3-dihydro-1,4-benzodiazepin-2-one
- CAS Number: 30843-56-2
- PubChem CID: 3082318
- ChemSpider: 2339763
- CompTox Dashboard (EPA): DTXSID80184857

Chemical and physical data
- Formula: C_{15}H_{10}FIN_{2}O
- Molar mass: 380.161 g·mol^{−1}
- 3D model (JSmol): Interactive image
- SMILES: C1C(=O)NC2=C(C=C(C=C2)I)C(=N1)C3=CC=CC=C3F
- InChI: InChI=1S/C15H10FIN2O/c16-12-4-2-1-3-10(12)15-11-7-9(17)5-6-13(11)19-14(20)8-18-15/h1-7H,8H2,(H,19,20); Key:UBSKLVILVGEEON-UHFFFAOYSA-N

Ro07-9749 is a benzodiazepine derivative with sedative and anxiolytic effects, which has been used as an internal standard in the analysis of other benzodiazepines.

== See also ==
- Flubromazepam
- Norflurazepam
- Phenazepam
- Ro05-4435
