= Rilmazafone =

Sedative benzodiazepine prodrug

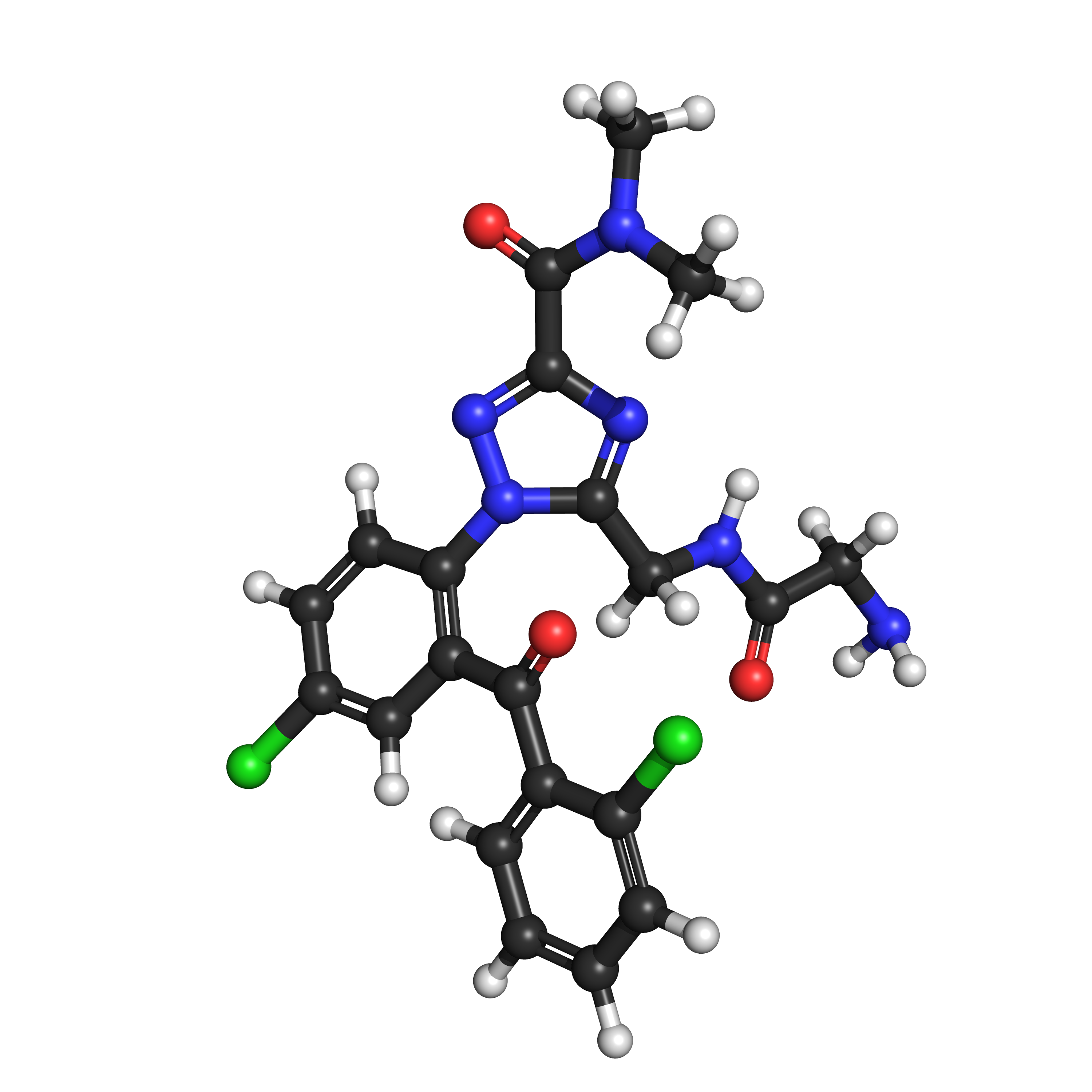
- Above: Rilmazafone molecular structure Below: 3D molecular representation

Clinical data
- Trade names: Rhythmy
- Other names: 5-([(2-aminoacetyl)amino]methyl)-1-[4-chloro-2-(2-chlorobenzoyl)phenyl]-N,N-dimethyl-1,2,4-triazole-3-carboxamide
- AHFS/Drugs.com: International Drug Names
- Routes of administration: Oral (tablets)
- ATC code: none

Legal status
- Legal status: Rx-only (JP)

Pharmacokinetic data
- Metabolism: Aminopeptidase (intestinal); hepatic
- Elimination half-life: 10.5 h (M-4 metabolite)
- Excretion: Urine (44–68% within 24 h, primarily as M-4)

Identifiers
- IUPAC name: 1-[4-chloro-2-(2-chlorobenzoyl)phenyl]-5-[(glycylamino)methyl]-N,N-dimethyl-1H-1,2,4-triazole-3-carboxamide
- CAS Number: 99593-25-6
- PubChem CID: 5069
- ChemSpider: 4891
- UNII: CU3H37T766
- KEGG: D08481
- CompTox Dashboard (EPA): DTXSID10244150

Chemical and physical data
- Formula: C_{21}H_{20}Cl_{2}N_{6}O_{3}
- Molar mass: 475.33 g·mol^{−1}
- 3D model (JSmol): Interactive image
- SMILES: CN(C)C(=O)c1nc(CNC(=O)CN)n(-c2ccc(Cl)cc2C(=O)c2ccccc2Cl)n1
- InChI: InChI=1S/C21H20Cl2N6O3/c1-28(2)21(32)20-26-17(11-25-18(30)10-24)29(27-20)16-8-7-12(22)9-14(16)19(31)13-5-3-4-6-15(13)23/h3-9H,10-11,24H2,1-2H3,(H,25,30); Key:KYHFRCPLIGODFH-UHFFFAOYSA-N

Rilmazafone (リスミー, brand name Rhythmy; developmental code 450191-S) is a water-soluble prodrug developed by Shionogi and approved in Japan for the treatment of insomnia and as a pre-anesthetic agent. It is not a benzodiazepine in the pharmacological or structural sense — the parent compound contains no diazepine ring and has no affinity for benzodiazepine receptors — but is converted inside the body into several active benzodiazepine metabolites, principally rilmazolam, which produce sedative and hypnotic effects. Outside Japan, rilmazafone has appeared as a new psychoactive substance (NPS) and has been implicated in fatal overdoses in Europe and North America.

== Chemistry ==
Rilmazafone is a 1H-1,2,4-triazolyl benzophenone derivative. Its molecular formula is C_{21}H_{20}Cl_{2}N_{6}O_{3} and it is freely soluble in water, which distinguishes it from most clinically used benzodiazepines and contributed to its design rationale as a prodrug. The parent compound contains no diazepine ring; the benzodiazepine scaffold is only present in the active metabolites formed after intestinal biotransformation.

== Pharmacology ==
Rilmazafone itself has negligible affinity for GABA_{A} receptors and produces no psychoactive effects prior to metabolism. Its pharmacological activity is mediated entirely through its metabolites, particularly rilmazolam, which acts as a positive allosteric modulator of the GABA_{A} receptor, enhancing the inhibitory effects of gamma-aminobutyric acid (GABA) in the central nervous system. This produces sedative, hypnotic, anxiolytic, and muscle-relaxant effects characteristic of the benzodiazepine class.

Because rilmazafone's prodrug structure bypasses direct receptor interaction until after intestinal metabolism, it was developed partly with the intention of reducing the abuse potential and side-effect profile associated with direct-acting benzodiazepines, though its metabolites retain the full pharmacodynamic profile of the class.

== Metabolism and pharmacokinetics ==
Rilmazolam, the primary active metabolite

After oral administration, rilmazafone undergoes rapid biotransformation by aminopeptidase enzymes in the small intestine, with cleavage producing a desglycylated intermediate (191DG) that undergoes spontaneous, non-enzymatic cyclization to form rilmazolam. This activation occurs during a single passage through the intestinal wall, so the parent compound, rilmazafone, is not detectable in human plasma after common therapeutic doses of 1–2 mg.

Oral administration in humans produces at least five pharmacologically active metabolites. Rilmazolam (M-1) is the principal benzodiazepine metabolite, but — unlike the pattern observed in animal studies — M-4 is the predominant species in human plasma for up to six hours after dosing. Additional metabolites include M-2, M-A, and M-3. Rilmazolam itself undergoes further hepatic metabolism to yield N-desmethylrilmazolam, di-desmethylrilmazolam, and carboxy rilmazolam, all of which retain some pharmacological activity.

Urinary excretion accounts for the majority of elimination, with 44–68% of the administered dose recovered in urine within 24 hours, primarily as M-4. Other metabolites and their conjugates collectively account for less than 1% of the dose. The elimination half-life of the M-4 metabolite in humans is approximately 10.5 hours.

=== Active metabolite: Rilmazolam ===
Rilmazolam (CAS 50330-59-1) is a triazolobenzodiazepine with the molecular formula C_{19}H_{15}Cl_{2}N_{5}O (molecular weight 400.26 g/mol). Its IUPAC name is 8-chloro-6-(2-chlorophenyl)-N,N-dimethyl-4H-[1,2,4]triazolo[1,5-a][1,4]benzodiazepine-2-carboxamide. The compound is soluble in methanol and chloroform. Rilmazolam has never been independently developed or approved for medical use in any country; it is encountered clinically and forensically only as a consequence of rilmazafone administration or misuse.

== Medical uses ==
In Japan, rilmazafone is approved under the brand name Rhythmy (リスミー) by Shionogi for two indications: treatment of insomnia at an oral dose of 1–2 mg once daily at bedtime, and as a pre-anesthetic medication at a dose of 2 mg administered before surgery. It is classified as a prescription medication in Japan and is not approved for medical use in any other country.

== Adverse effects ==
As with other agents that produce active benzodiazepine metabolites, rilmazafone can cause dose-dependent central nervous system depression. Reported adverse effects include sedation, impaired motor coordination, anterograde amnesia, and next-day residual effects sometimes described as a "hangover." Overdose, particularly in combination with other CNS depressants such as ethanol or opioids, may result in respiratory depression, coma, and death.

Several fatal overdoses have been attributed to rilmazafone and its metabolites in forensic case series, most in the context of non-medical use outside Japan. Rilmazolam and its downstream metabolites have been identified as the causative agents in these intoxications.

== New psychoactive substance status ==
Outside Japan, rilmazafone has been identified and monitored as a new psychoactive substance (NPS) by drug early-warning systems in the United States and Europe. Because the parent compound lacks a diazepine ring, it is not classified as a controlled substance in the United States or in several other jurisdictions that rely on structural definitions for scheduling. This structural loophole has contributed to its circulation in illicit drug markets as an unscheduled or insufficiently scheduled substance.

== Legal status ==
Rilmazafone is approved as a prescription medication in Japan (Rx-only). It is not approved for medical use and is not scheduled as a controlled substance in the United States, Canada, or most European jurisdictions as of mid-2026, though early-warning monitoring is ongoing in several countries.

== See also ==
- Avizafone (diazepam prodrug)
- Noravizafone desglycyl (nordazepam prodrug)
- Alprazolam triazolobenzophenone
- Clonazafone desglycyl
- Diclazafone desglycyl
