= Diclazafone desglycyl =

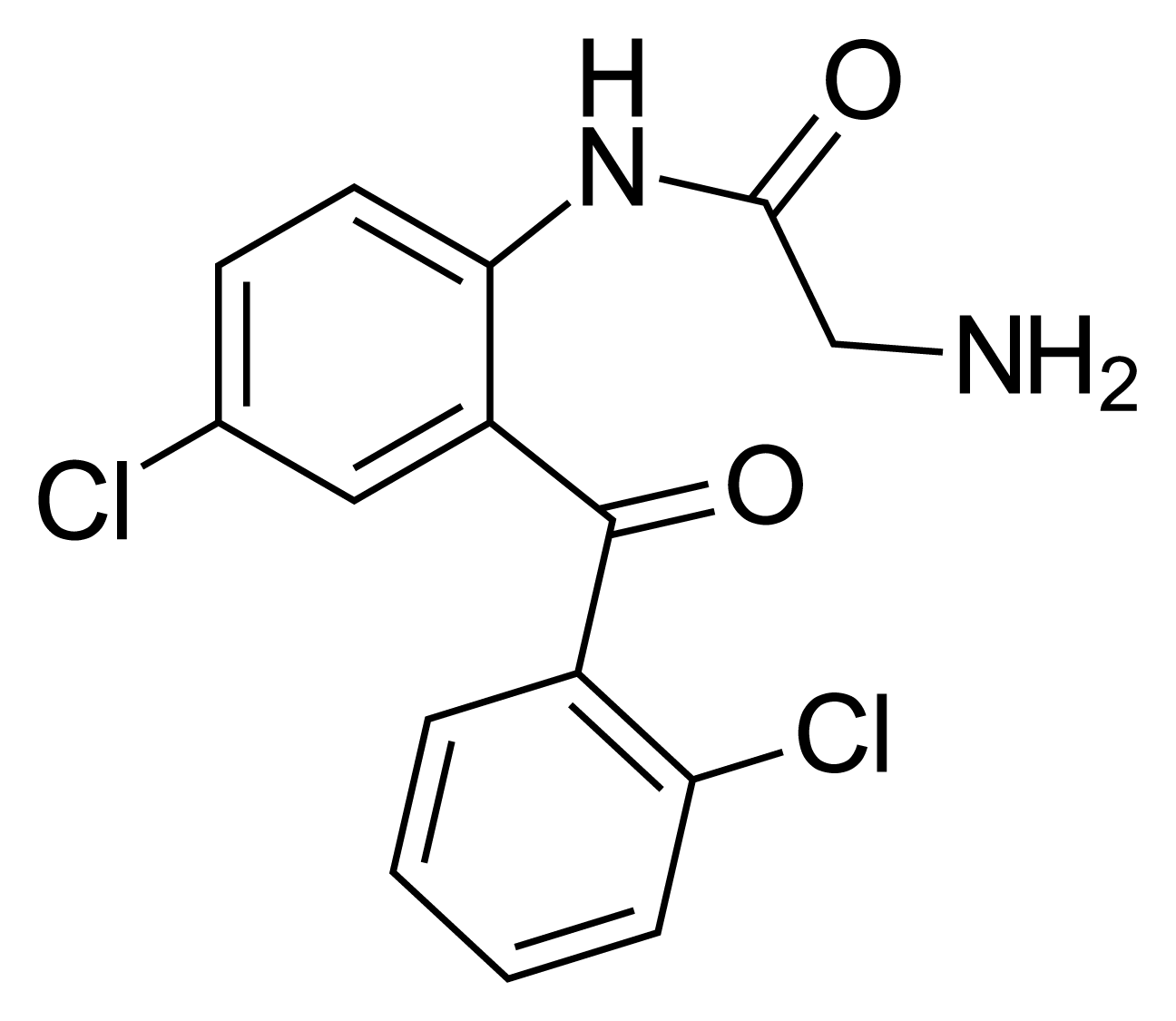

Identifiers
- IUPAC name: 2-amino-N-[4-chloro-2-(2-chlorobenzoyl)phenyl]acetamide
- CAS Number: 5600-85-1
- PubChem CID: 20442930
- ChemSpider: 15022740
- ChEMBL: ChEMBLCHEMBL

Chemical and physical data
- Formula: C_{15}H_{12}Cl_{2}N_{2}O_{2}
- Molar mass: 323.17 g·mol^{−1}
- 3D model (JSmol): Interactive image
- SMILES: C1=CC=C(C(=C1)C(=O)C2=C(C=CC(=C2)Cl)NC(=O)CN)Cl
- InChI: InChI=1S/C15H12Cl2N2O2/c16-9-5-6-13(19-14(20)8-18)11(7-9)15(21)10-3-1-2-4-12(10)17/h1-7H,8,18H2,(H,19,20); Key:YGKSPOBIXHTPMV-UHFFFAOYSA-N

Diclazafone desglycyl is a chemical compound that can act as both a prodrug and a synthetic precursor for the benzodiazepine derivative delorazepam, the N-desmethyl derivative of the designer benzodiazepine diclazepam. It is inactive in vitro but has similar effects to delorazepam in vivo due to metabolic conversion to the active benzodiazepine form. It has been detected as a designer drug, first being identified in Denmark in September 2024.

== See also ==
- Alprazolam triazolobenzophenone
- Avizafone
- Rilmazafone
