= Bromonordiazepam =

- Chemical structure of bromonordiazepam

Pharmacokinetic data
- Bioavailability: >70%
- Elimination half-life: 86.73 ± 6.37 h

Identifiers
- IUPAC name: 7-bromo-5-phenyl-1,3-dihydro-2H-benzo[e][1,4]diazepin-2-one
- CAS Number: 2894-61-3
- PubChem CID: 76167
- UNII: B5O0SGUU77
- ChEMBL: ChEMBL327679
- CompTox Dashboard (EPA): DTXSID10183136

Chemical and physical data
- Formula: C_{15}H_{11}BrN_{2}O
- Molar mass: 315.170 g·mol^{−1}
- 3D model (JSmol): Interactive image
- SMILES: C1C(=O)NC2=C(C=C(C=C2)Br)C(=N1)C3=CC=CC=C3
- InChI: InChI=1S/C15H11BrN2O/c16-11-6-7-13-12(8-11)15(17-9-14(19)18-13)10-4-2-1-3-5-10/h1-8H,9H2,(H,18,19); Key:ATCCWKYKHCKDGT-UHFFFAOYSA-N

Bromonordiazepam, also known as desalkylgidazepam, is a benzodiazepine derivative which has been sold as a designer drug. It is structurally similar to diazepam, and its analogue nordazepam, but exchanges a chloro group at position 7 for a bromine substitution. It is the active metabolite of gidazepam, but has appeared in the illicit drug market alone. Its in-vitro potency is similar that of alprazolam, while subjective effects are not yet reported.

== See also ==
- Ethylbromazolam
- Flubromazepam
- Phenazepam
- N-Desalkylflurazepam
- 3-Hydroxydesalkylgidazepam
