= 3-Hydroxyphenazepam =

Benzodiazepine medication

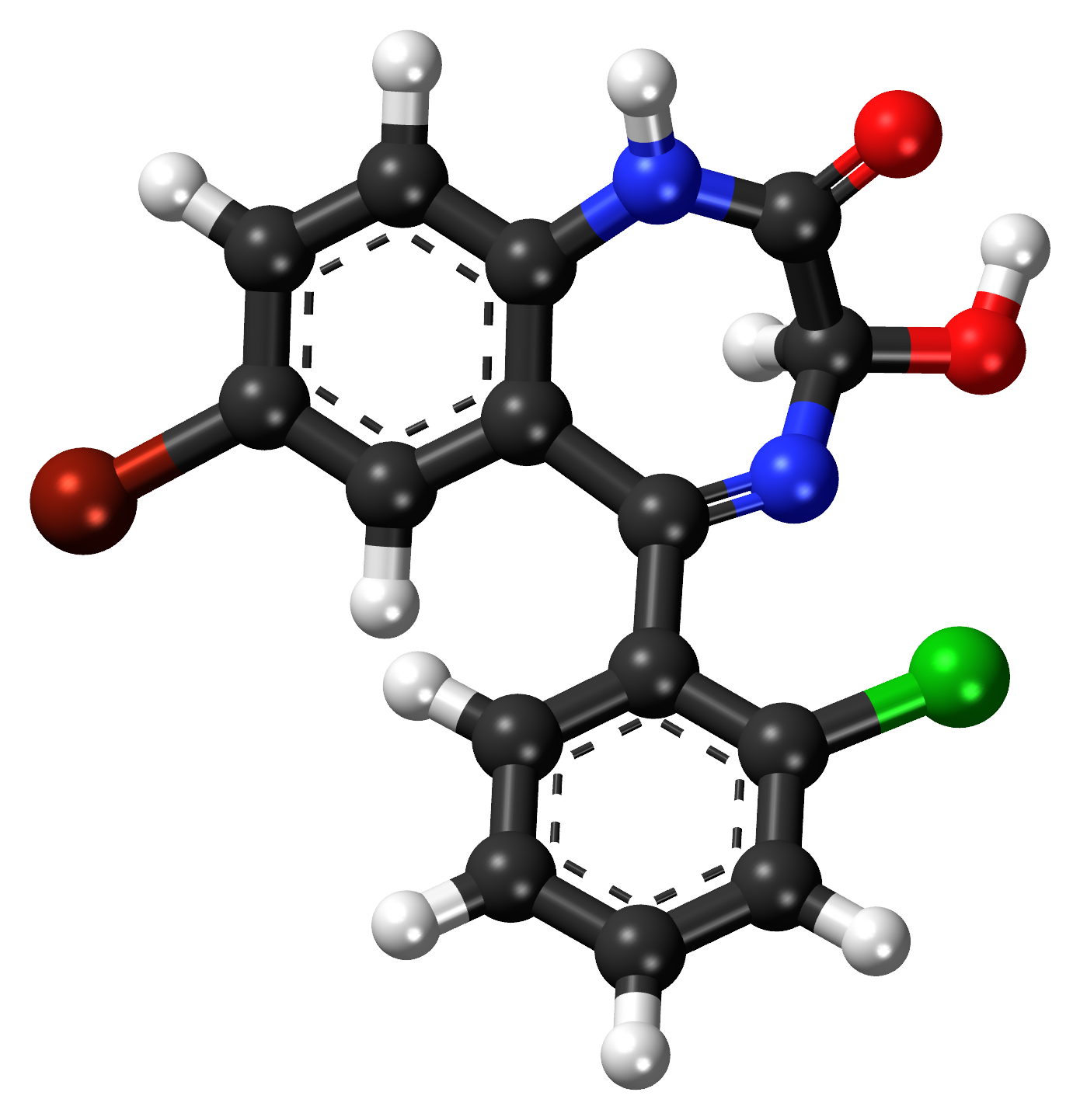

Clinical data
- ATC code: None

Legal status
- Legal status: CA: Schedule IV; DE: NpSG (Industrial and scientific use only); UK: Under Psychoactive Substances Act

Identifiers
- IUPAC name: 7-Bromo-5-(2-chlorophenyl)-3-hydroxy-1,3-dihydro-2H-1,4-benzodiazepin-2-one
- CAS Number: 70030-11-4
- PubChem CID: 125820
- ChemSpider: 111897
- UNII: 1KJ8MP77JK
- CompTox Dashboard (EPA): DTXSID10990281

Chemical and physical data
- Formula: C_{15}H_{10}BrClN_{2}O_{2}
- Molar mass: 365.61 g·mol^{−1}
- 3D model (JSmol): Interactive image
- SMILES: c1ccc(c(c1)C2=NC(C(=O)Nc3c2cc(cc3)Br)O)Cl
- InChI: InChI=1S/C15H10BrClN2O2/c16-8-5-6-12-10(7-8)13(19-15(21)14(20)18-12)9-3-1-2-4-11(9)17/h1-7,15,21H,(H,18,20); Key:KRJKJUWAZOWXNV-UHFFFAOYSA-N

3-Hydroxyphenazepam is a benzodiazepine with hypnotic, sedative, anxiolytic, and anticonvulsant properties. It is an active metabolite of phenazepam, as well as the active metabolite of the benzodiazepine prodrug cinazepam. Relative to phenazepam, 3-hydroxyphenazepam has diminished myorelaxant properties, but is about equivalent in most other regards. Like other benzodiazepines, 3-hydroxyphenazepam behaves as a positive allosteric modulator of the benzodiazepine site of the GABA_{A} receptor with an EC_{50} value of 10.3 nM. It has been sold as a designer drug.

== See also ==
- Lorazepam, licensed medication
- Nifoxipam
- Nitemazepam
