= Rilmazolam =

Active metabolite of rilmazafone

Clinical data
- Trade names: (none, active metabolite of Rilmazafone)

Legal status
- Legal status: Generally Legal

Pharmacokinetic data
- Metabolism: Hepatic; N-demethylation
- Excretion: Renal

Identifiers
- IUPAC name: 8-chloro-6-(2-chlorophenyl)-N,N-dimethyl-4H-[1,2,4]triazolo[1,5-a][1,4]benzodiazepine-2-carboxamide
- CAS Number: 50330-59-1
- PubChem CID: 148494
- ChemSpider: 4450018
- UNII: 242T8WV28A
- CompTox Dashboard (EPA): DTXSID50198345

Chemical and physical data
- Formula: C_{19}H_{15}Cl_{2}N_{5}O
- Molar mass: 400.26 g·mol^{−1}
- 3D model (JSmol): Interactive image
- SMILES: CN(C)C(=O)C1=NN2C(=N1)CN=C(C3=C2C=CC(=C3)Cl)C4=CC=CC=C4Cl
- InChI: InChI=InChI=1S/C19H15Cl2N5O/c1-25(2)19(27)18-23-16-10-22-17(12-5-3-4-6-14(12)21)13-9-11(20)7-8-15(13)26(16)24-18/h3-9H,10H2,1-2H3; Key:YMJXPUGNWIWFJI-UHFFFAOYSA-N

Rilmazolam is a triazolobenzodiazepine and the principal active metabolite of rilmazafone, a prodrug sold under the brand name Rhythmy (リスミー) in Japan and approved there for the treatment of insomnia and as a pre-anesthetic agent. Rilmazolam itself has never been independently developed or approved for medical use in any country.

== Chemical and physical data ==
Rilmazolam is a triazolobenzodiazepine in which a triazole ring is fused to the benzodiazepine diazepine core. Its molecular formula is C_{19}H_{15}Cl_{2}N_{5}O and its molecular weight is 400.26 g/mol. Its IUPAC name is 8-chloro-6-(2-chlorophenyl)-N,N-dimethyl-4H-[1,2,4]triazolo[1,5-a][1,4]benzodiazepine-2-carboxamide. It is soluble in methanol and chloroform.

== Pharmacology ==
Rilmazolam acts as a positive allosteric modulator at the GABA_{A} receptor, enhancing the inhibitory effects of gamma-aminobutyric acid (GABA) in the central nervous system. This produces sedative, hypnotic, anxiolytic, and muscle-relaxant effects characteristic of the benzodiazepine class.

== Metabolism and pharmacokinetics ==
Rilmazolam is not administered directly but is formed in vivo from rilmazafone, its prodrug, which has negligible affinity for benzodiazepine receptors. After oral administration of rilmazafone, aminopeptidase enzymes in the small intestine cleave the parent compound to a desglycylated intermediate (191DG), which then undergoes spontaneous non-enzymatic cyclization to yield rilmazolam. This activation occurs during a single passage through the intestinal wall, such that rilmazafone itself is not detectable in human plasma after therapeutic doses of 1–2 mg.

Oral rilmazafone produces at least five active metabolites in humans: rilmazolam (M-1), M-2, M-A, and M-3, with M-4 being the predominant species in human plasma for up to six hours after dosing — a pattern distinct from that seen in animal studies. Urinary excretion accounts for the bulk of elimination, with 44–68% of the administered dose recovered in urine within 24 hours, primarily as M-4. Other metabolites and their conjugates account for less than 1% of the dose. Rilmazolam is further metabolized to N-desmethylrilmazolam, which is also pharmacologically active.

== Toxicology ==
Rilmazolam can cause dose-dependent central nervous system depression, including sedation, impaired motor coordination, anterograde amnesia, and next-day residual effects. Overdose may lead to respiratory depression, coma, and death, particularly in combination with other CNS depressants such as ethanol or opioids. Several fatal overdoses have been reported in which rilmazolam was identified as the primary causative agent or a major contributing factor.
