= Ro20-8552 =

Chemical compound

Legal status
- Legal status: CA: Schedule IV; DE: NpSG (Industrial and scientific use only); UK: Under Psychoactive Substances Act

Identifiers
- IUPAC name: 8-chloro-5-(2-fluorophenyl)-7-methyl-1,3-dihydro-1,4-benzodiazepin-2-one
- CAS Number: 154849-06-6
- PubChem CID: 44366138
- ChemSpider: 23222080
- ChEMBL: ChEMBL356411
- CompTox Dashboard (EPA): DTXSID101337051

Chemical and physical data
- Formula: C_{16}H_{12}ClFN_{2}O
- Molar mass: 302.73 g·mol^{−1}
- 3D model (JSmol): Interactive image
- SMILES: CC1=CC2=C(C=C1Cl)NC(=O)CN=C2C3=CC=CC=C3F
- InChI: InChI=1S/C16H12ClFN2O/c1-9-6-11-14(7-12(9)17)20-15(21)8-19-16(11)10-4-2-3-5-13(10)18/h2-7H,8H2,1H3,(H,20,21); Key:GANKBGRUGXCJBG-UHFFFAOYSA-N

Ro20-8552 is a benzodiazepine derivative with sedative and anxiolytic effects, which has been sold as a designer drug.

== See also ==
- Ro05-2904
- Ro05-4435
- Ro05-4082
- Ro07-4065
- Ro20-8065
