= Diclazepam =

Benzodiazepine

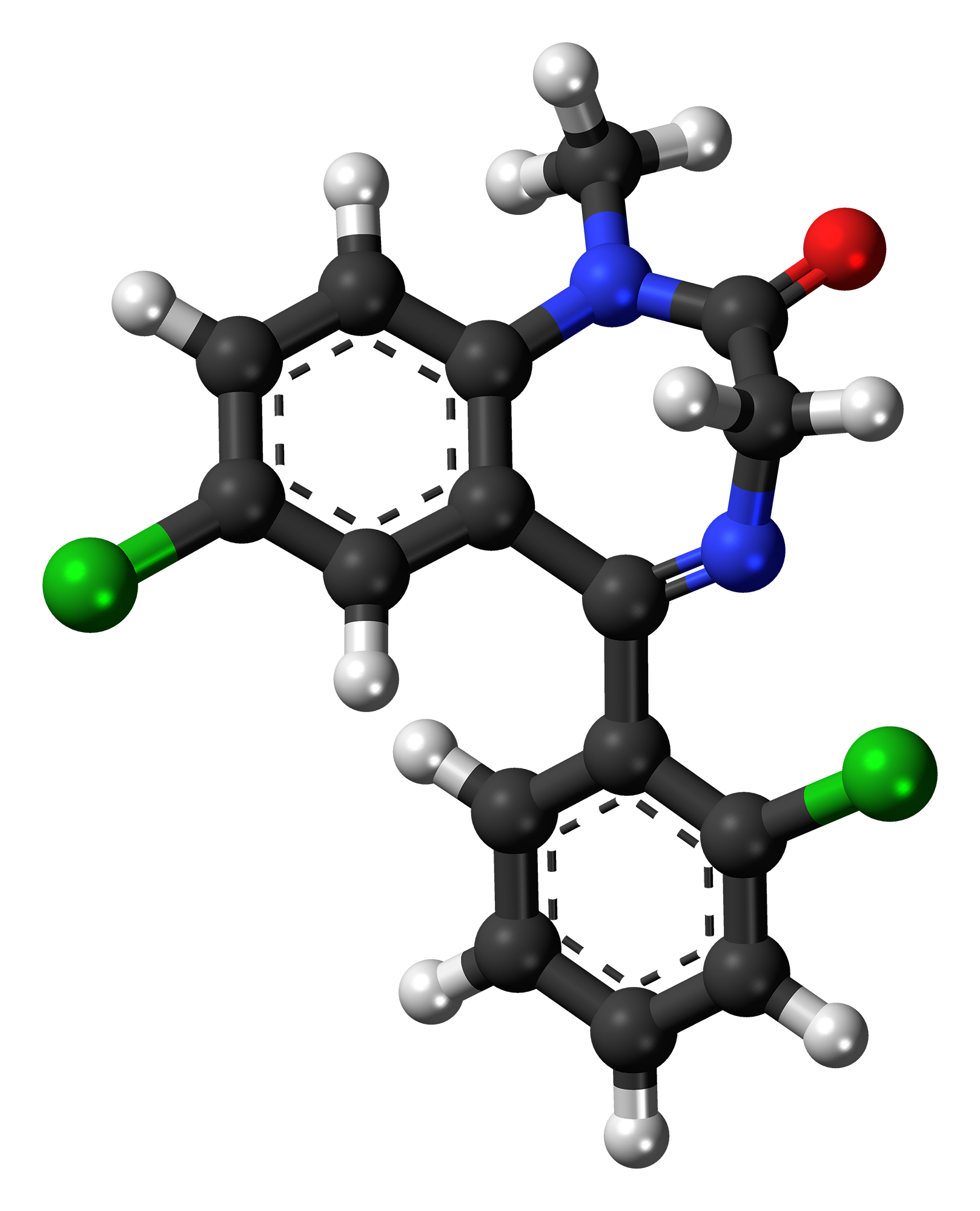

Clinical data
- Routes of administration: Oral, sublingual

Legal status
- Legal status: BR: Class B1 (Psychoactive drugs); CA: Schedule IV; DE: Anlage II (Authorized trade only, not prescriptible); UK: Class C; US: Schedule I

Pharmacokinetic data
- Bioavailability: ?
- Metabolism: Hepatic
- Elimination half-life: ~42 hours
- Excretion: Renal

Identifiers
- IUPAC name: 7-Chloro-5-(2-chlorophenyl)-1-methyl-1,3-dihydro-2H-1,4-benzodiazepin-2-one
- CAS Number: 2894-68-0
- PubChem CID: 76168
- ChemSpider: 68652
- UNII: 070818R7PB
- KEGG: C22813
- CompTox Dashboard (EPA): DTXSID30183138

Chemical and physical data
- Formula: C_{16}H_{12}Cl_{2}N_{2}O
- Molar mass: 319.19 g·mol^{−1}
- 3D model (JSmol): Interactive image
- SMILES: CN1C2=C(C=C(C=C2)Cl)C(C3=C(Cl)C=CC=C3)=NCC1=O
- InChI: InChI=1S/C16H12Cl2N2O/c1-20-14-7-6-10(17)8-12(14)16(19-9-15(20)21)11-4-2-3-5-13(11)18/h2-8H,9H2,1H3; Key:VPAYQWRBBOGGPY-UHFFFAOYSA-N

Diclazepam (Ro5-3448), also known as chlorodiazepam and 2'-chloro-diazepam, is a benzodiazepine and functional analog of diazepam. It was first synthesized by Leo Sternbach and his team at Hoffman-La Roche in 1960. It is not currently approved for use as a medication, but rather sold as an unscheduled substance. Efficacy and safety have not been tested in humans.

In animal models, its effects are similar to diazepam, possessing long-acting anxiolytic, anticonvulsant, hypnotic, sedative, skeletal muscle relaxant, and amnestic properties.

== Metabolism ==
Metabolism of this compound has been assessed, revealing diclazepam has an approximate elimination half-life of 42 hours and undergoes N-demethylation to delorazepam, which can be detected in urine for 6 days following administration of the parent compound. Other metabolites detected were lorazepam and lormetazepam which were detectable in urine for 19 and 11 days, respectively, indicating hydroxylation by cytochrome P450 enzymes occurring concurrently with N-demethylation.

== Legal status ==
=== United Kingdom ===
In the UK, diclazepam has been classified as a Class C drug by the May 2017 amendment to The Misuse of Drugs Act 1971 along with several other benzodiazepine drugs.

=== United States ===
On December 23, 2022, the DEA announced it had begun consideration on the matter of placing Diclazepam under temporary Schedule I status.

Later on July 25, 2023, the DEA published a pre-print notice that Diclazepam would become temporarily scheduled as a Schedule I controlled substance from 07/26/2023 to 07/26/2025. On July 25, 2025, and effective the following day, the DEA extended the temporary scheduling until July 26, 2026.

== See also ==
- 2′-Bromonordazepam
- Diazepam
- Difludiazepam
- Delorazepam (Nordiclazepam)
- Lorazepam
- Phenazepam
- Ro09-9212
- Ro5-4864 (4'-Chlorodiazepam)
- Ro07-5220 (6'-Chlorodiclazepam)
