= Cloxazolam =

Benzodiazepine medication

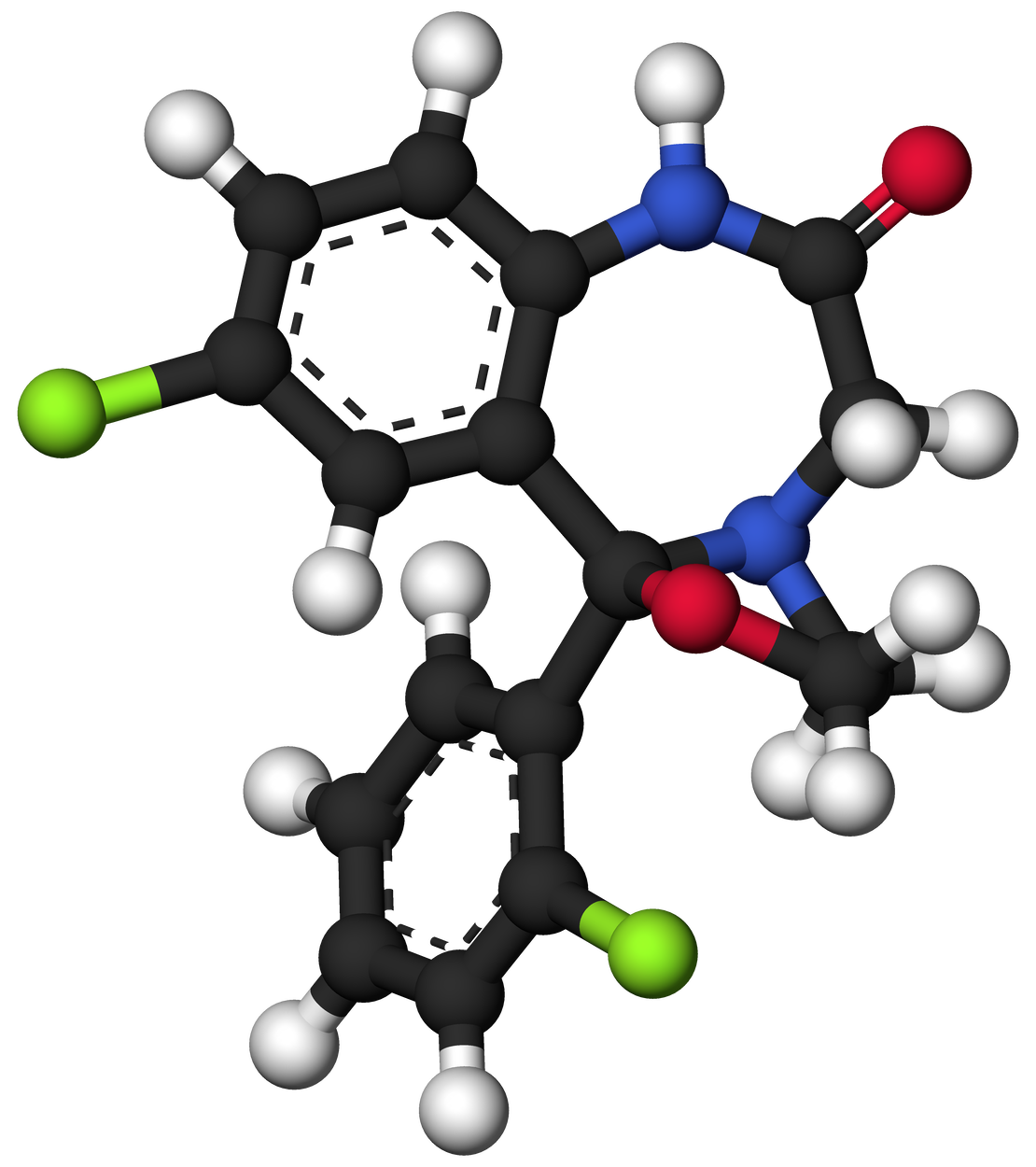

Clinical data
- Trade names: Akton, Cloxam, Clozal, Elum, Olcadil, and Sepazon
- AHFS/Drugs.com: International Drug Names
- Routes of administration: Oral
- ATC code: N05BA22 (WHO)

Legal status
- Legal status: BR: Class B1 (Psychoactive drugs); CA: Schedule IV; DE: Anlage III (Special prescription form required); UK: Class C; US: Schedule IV

Pharmacokinetic data
- Metabolism: Hepatic
- Elimination half-life: 65 hours
- Excretion: Renal

Identifiers
- IUPAC name: 10-chloro-11b-(2-chlorophenyl)-2,3,5,7-tetrahydro-[1,3]oxazolo[3,2-d][1,4]benzodiazepin-6-one
- CAS Number: 24166-13-0
- PubChem CID: 2816
- DrugBank: DB01553
- ChemSpider: 2714
- UNII: GYL649Z0HY
- KEGG: D01268
- ChEMBL: ChEMBL2107254
- CompTox Dashboard (EPA): DTXSID0022854

Chemical and physical data
- Formula: C_{17}H_{14}Cl_{2}N_{2}O_{2}
- Molar mass: 349.21 g·mol^{−1}
- 3D model (JSmol): Interactive image
- SMILES: Clc1ccccc1C42OCCN2CC(=O)Nc3c4cc(Cl)cc3
- InChI: InChI=1S/C17H14Cl2N2O2/c18-11-5-6-15-13(9-11)17(12-3-1-2-4-14(12)19)21(7-8-23-17)10-16(22)20-15/h1-6,9H,7-8,10H2,(H,20,22); Key:ZIXNZOBDFKSQTC-UHFFFAOYSA-N

Cloxazolam is a oxazolobenzodiazepine derivative that has anxiolytic, sedative, and anticonvulsant properties. It is not widely used; as of August 2018 it was marketed in Belgium, Luxembourg, Portugal, Brazil, and Japan. In 2019, it has been retired from the Belgian market.

== See also ==
- Cinazepam
- Gidazepam
