= 2′-Bromonordazepam =

Identifiers
- IUPAC name: 7-chloro-5-(2-bromophenyl)-1H-benzo[e][1,4]diazepin-2(3H)-one
- CAS Number: 63574-83-4
- PubChem CID: 760868
- ChemSpider: 665276
- UNII: ST50759256
- ChEMBL: ChEMBL315178
- CompTox Dashboard (EPA): DTXSID80353985

Chemical and physical data
- Formula: C_{15}H_{10}BrClN_{2}O
- Molar mass: 349.61 g·mol^{−1}
- 3D model (JSmol): Interactive image
- SMILES: C1C(=O)NC2=C(C=C(C=C2)Cl)C(=N1)C3=CC=CC=C3Br
- InChI: InChI=InChI=1S/C15H10BrClN2O/c16-12-4-2-1-3-10(12)15-11-7-9(17)5-6-13(11)19-14(20)8-18-15/h1-7H,8H2,(H,19,20); Key:RNBOUZKGTVHUEX-UHFFFAOYSA-N

2′-Bromonordazepam is a benzodiazepine derivative which is the 2'-bromo derivative of nordazepam. It was invented in the 1970s but was never marketed. It is a potent benzodiazepine comparable in strength to clonazepam with similar sedative and anxiolytic effects, but is not known to have been marketed as a designer drug.

== See also ==
- Diclazepam
- Fludiazepam
- Imidazenil
