= Flubromazepam =

Benzodiazepine designer drug

Clinical data
- Routes of administration: Oral

Legal status
- Legal status: CA: Schedule IV; DE: Anlage II (Authorized trade only, not prescriptible); UK: Class C; US: Unscheduled (Virginia Schedule I, Georgia Schedule IV)

Pharmacokinetic data
- Elimination half-life: 106 hours

Identifiers
- IUPAC name: 7-Bromo-5-(2-fluorophenyl)-1,3-dihydro-1,4-benzodiazepin-2-one
- CAS Number: 2647-50-9
- PubChem CID: 12947024
- ChemSpider: 10441497
- UNII: GKX573279U
- CompTox Dashboard (EPA): DTXSID40513609
- ECHA InfoCard: 100.428.842

Chemical and physical data
- Formula: C_{15}H_{10}BrFN_{2}O
- Molar mass: 333.160 g·mol^{−1}
- 3D model (JSmol): Interactive image
- SMILES: BrC1=CC(C(C2=CC=CC=C2F)=NC3)=C(C=C1)NC3=O
- InChI: InChI=1S/C15H10BrFN2O/c16-9-5-6-13-11(7-9)15(18-8-14(20)19-13)10-3-1-2-4-12(10)17/h1-7H,8H2,(H,19,20); Key:ZRKDDZBVSZLOFS-UHFFFAOYSA-N

Flubromazepam is a benzodiazepine derivative which was first synthesized in 1960, but was never marketed and did not receive any further attention or study until late 2012 when it appeared on the grey market as a novel designer drug.

It is a structural analog of phenazepam in which the chlorine atom has been replaced by a fluorine atom.

An alternate isomer, 5-(2-bromophenyl)-7-fluoro-1,3-dihydro-2H-1,4-benzodiazepin-2-one or "iso-flubromazepam", may have been sold under the same name.

Alternate isomer

== Legal status ==
=== United Kingdom ===
In the UK, flubromazepam has been classified as a Class C drug by the May 2017 amendment to The Misuse of Drugs Act 1971 along with several other designer benzodiazepine drugs.

=== United States ===
Flubromazepam, clonazolam, and flubromazolam are Schedule I controlled substances under Virginia State Law.

== See also ==
- List of benzodiazepine designer drugs
- Bromonordiazepam
- Desmethyletizolam
- Ro07-9749
- SH-I-048A
- Imidazenil (licensed)
- Phenazepam
