= Alprazolam triazolobenzophenone =

Alprazolam prodrug

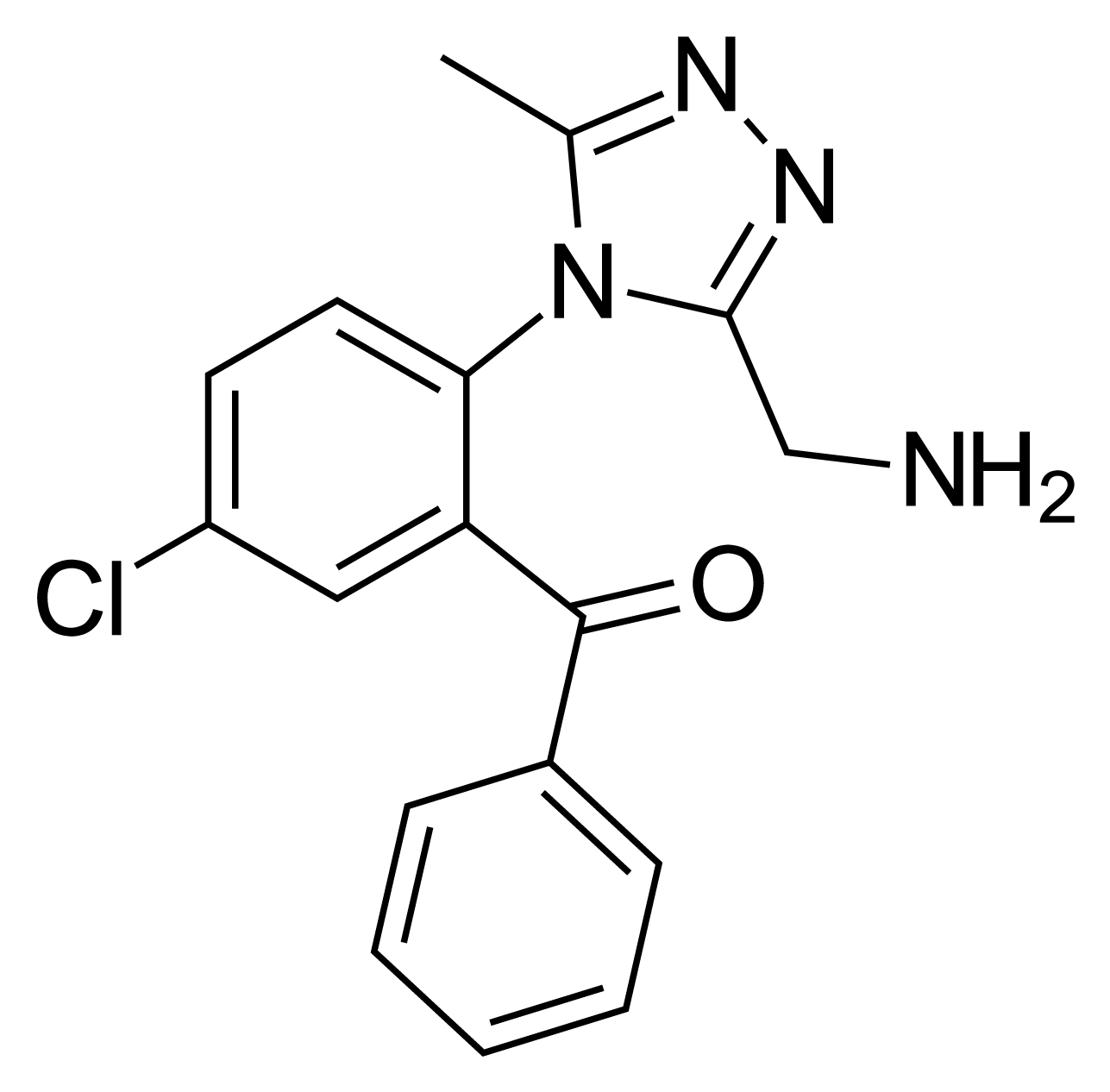

Identifiers
- IUPAC name: {2-[3-(Aminomethyl)-5-methyl-4H-1,2,4-triazol-4-yl]-5-chlorophenyl}(phenyl)methanone
- CAS Number: 69505-70-0
- PubChem CID: 15567865
- ChemSpider: 48057672
- UNII: SC7MXP4H26
- CompTox Dashboard (EPA): DTXSID60574454

Chemical and physical data
- Formula: C_{17}H_{15}ClN_{4}O
- Molar mass: 326.78 g·mol^{−1}
- 3D model (JSmol): Interactive image
- SMILES: CC1=NN=C(N1C2=C(C=C(C=C2)Cl)C(=O)C3=CC=CC=C3)CN
- InChI: InChI=1S/C17H15ClN4O/c1-11-20-21-16(10-19)22(11)15-8-7-13(18)9-14(15)17(23)12-5-3-2-4-6-12/h2-9H,10,19H2,1H3; Key:WWADXOXMCNJJKR-UHFFFAOYSA-N

Alprazolam triazolobenzophenone is a chemical compound that is a prodrug for the benzodiazepine derivative alprazolam. At neutral pH it readily cyclizes to alprazolam, while in acidic conditions alprazolam undergoes a ring-opening reaction back to the ketone. A series of related acyl derivatives was researched in the 1980s as injectable water-soluble prodrugs of alprazolam, but were never developed for medical use. Subsequently, this compound has been detected as a designer drug, first being identified from a seizure in Spain in March 2014.

== See also ==
- Avizafone
- Rilmazafone
- 1-(2-Chloro-N-methylbenzimidoyl)cyclopentanol
