= Phenazepam =

Benzodiazepine drug

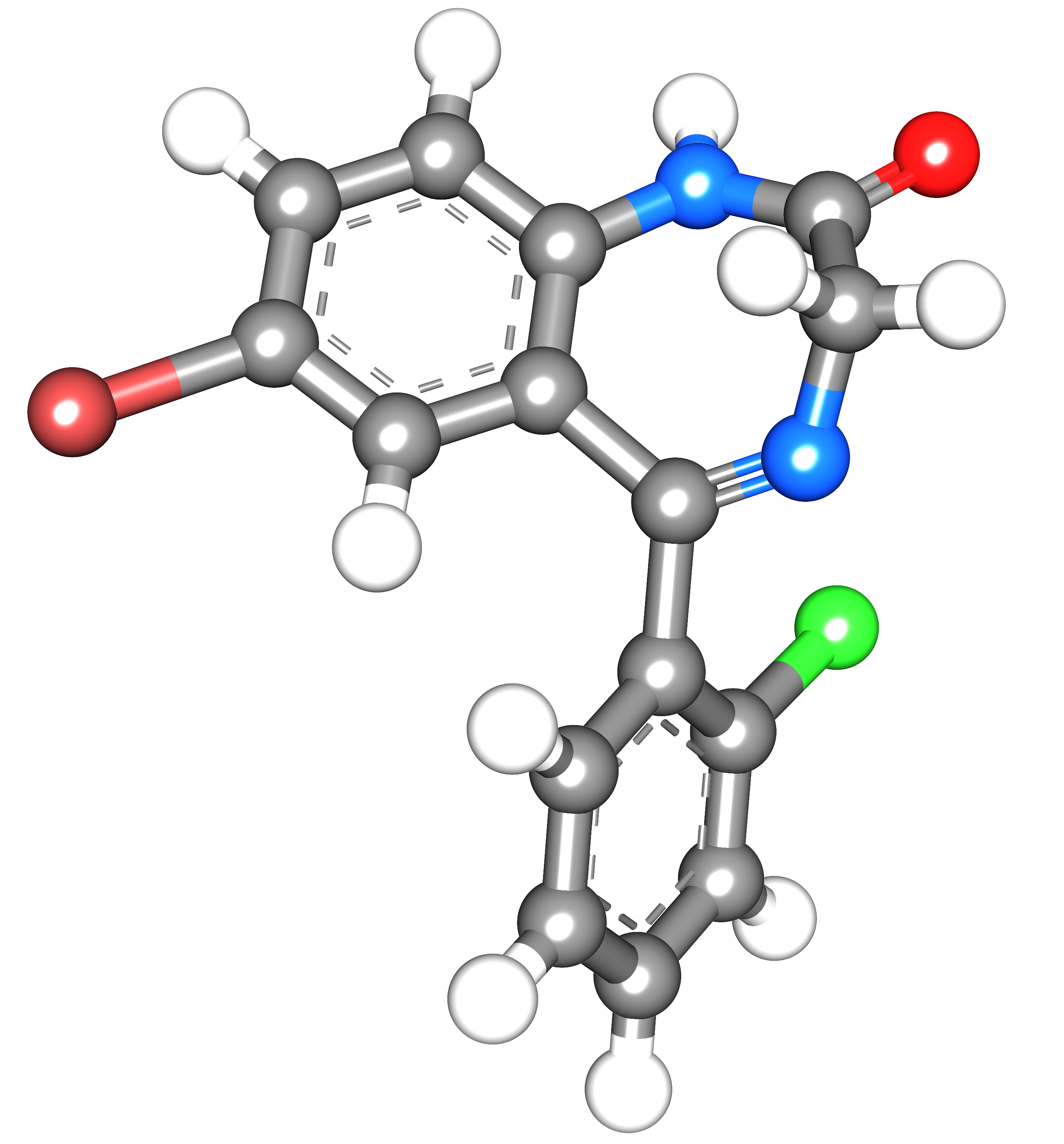

Clinical data
- AHFS/Drugs.com: International Drug Names
- Routes of administration: By mouth, intramuscular, intravenous
- Drug class: Benzodiazepine
- ATC code: none

Legal status
- Legal status: AU: S4 (Prescription Only Medicine) - Not specifically scheduled by name in SUSMP, but would be covered by the catch all of "Benzodiazepine Derivatives except where separately specified" listed in Schedule 4.; BR: Class B1 (Psychoactive drugs); CA: Schedule IV; DE: Anlage III (Special prescription form required); UK: Class C; US: Unscheduled (Schedule I in Louisiana). Not FDA approved.; (RU) Rx only

Pharmacokinetic data
- Bioavailability: 16.7% (rat)
- Metabolism: Hepatic – aromatic oxidation and C3-hydroxylation
- Onset of action: 1.5–4 hours
- Elimination half-life: 6–18 hours (active metabolite unknown)
- Excretion: Renal

Identifiers
- IUPAC name: 7-Bromo-5-(2-chlorophenyl)-1,3-dihydro-2H-1,4-benzodiazepin-2-one
- CAS Number: 51753-57-2
- PubChem CID: 40113
- ChemSpider: 36657
- UNII: 3DSB43090Z
- KEGG: C22816
- ChEMBL: ChEMBLCHEMBL1709464
- CompTox Dashboard (EPA): DTXSID00199685
- ECHA InfoCard: 100.207.405

Chemical and physical data
- Formula: C_{15}H_{10}BrClN_{2}O
- Molar mass: 349.61 g·mol^{−1}
- 3D model (JSmol): Interactive image
- SMILES: c1ccc(c(c1)C2=NCC(=O)Nc3c2cc(cc3)Br)Cl
- InChI: InChI=1S/C15H10BrClN2O/c16-9-5-6-13-11(7-9)15(18-8-14(20)19-13)10-3-1-2-4-12(10)17/h1-7H,8H2,(H,19,20); Key:CGMJQQJSWIRRRL-UHFFFAOYSA-N

Phenazepam (also known in Russia as bromdihydrochlorphenylbenzodiazepine) is a benzodiazepine drug, first developed in the Soviet Union in 1975, and now produced in Russia and several other countries.

Phenazepam is used in the treatment of various mental disorders such schizophrenia and anxiety. It can be used as a premedication before surgery as it augments the effects of anesthetics. In 2009, phenazepam has gained popularity as a recreational drug; misuse has been reported in the United Kingdom, Finland, Sweden, and the United States.

== Medical uses ==
- Brief reactive psychosis and hypochondriasis-senestopathic syndrome
- Vegetative dysfunction and vegetative lability
- Alcohol withdrawal syndrome
- Temporal lobe epilepsy and myoclonic epilepsy (used only occasionally as better options exist)
- Hyperkinesia and tics
- Muscle spasticity

Usually, a course of treatment with phenazepam should not normally exceed 2 weeks (in some cases therapy may be prolonged for up to 2 months) due to the risk of drug abuse and dependence. To prevent withdrawal syndrome, it is necessary to reduce the dose gradually.

== Chemistry ==
Phenazepam is a drug of the benzodiazepine class. Benzodiazepine drugs contain a benzene ring fused to a diazepine ring, which is a seven membered ring with the two nitrogen constituents located at R^{1} and R^{4}. The benzyl ring of phenazepam is substituted at R^{7} with a bromine group. Like most benzodiazepines, phenazepam has a phenyl ring in R^{5} which is substituted by chlorine in the R^{2'} group. Phenazepam also contains an oxygen group double bonded to R^{2} of its diazepine ring to form a ketone. This oxygen substitution at R^{2} is shared with other benzodiazepine drugs with the suffix -azepam.

Like other benzodiazepines, phenazepam (7-bromo-5-(2-chlorophenyl)-1,3-dihydro-1,4-benzodiazepin-2-one) is composed of a benzene ring fused to a seven-membered 1,4-diazepine ring. A 2-chlorophenyl ring is attached at the 5-position and a bromine is attached at the 7-position. Phenazepam has a molecular formula of C_{15}H_{10}BrClN_{2}O and a molecular weight of 349.6 g/mol.

== Side effects ==
Side effects include hiccups, dizziness, loss of coordination and drowsiness, along with anterograde amnesia which can be quite pronounced at high doses. As with other benzodiazepines, in case of abrupt discontinuation following prolonged use, severe withdrawal symptoms may occur including restlessness, anxiety, insomnia, seizures, convulsions and death, though because of its intermediate half-life as well as that of its active metabolites, these withdrawal symptoms may take two or more days to manifest.

== Contraindications ==
Benzodiazepines require special precaution if used in the elderly, during pregnancy, in children, alcohol or drug-dependent individuals and individuals with comorbid psychiatric disorders.

Phenazepam should not be taken with alcohol or any other CNS depressants. Phenazepam should not be used therapeutically for periods of longer than one month including tapering on and off the drug as recommended for any benzodiazepine in the British national formulary. Some patients may require longer term treatment.

Phenazepam was found to be a component in some "herbal incense" mixtures in Australia and New Zealand in 2011, namely "Kronic". The particular product variety was withdrawn from the market shortly after and replaced with a new formulation.

== Synthesis ==
First, 2-(o-chlorobenzoylamino)-5-bromo-2-chlorobenzophenone is prepared by acylation of p-bromoaniline with o-chlorobenzoic acid acyl chloride in the presence of a zinc chloride catalyst. This is hydrolysed with aqueous sulfuric acid to yield 2-amino-5-bromo-2'-chlorobenzophenone, which is then acylated with hydrochloride of aminoacetic acid acyl chloride in chloroform to form 2-(aminomethylkarbonylamino)-5-bromo-2-chlorobenzophenone hydrochloride, which is converted to a base with aqueous ammonia and then thermally cyclized to bromodihydrochlorophenylbenzodiazepine (phenazepam).

Hydrochloride of aminoacetic acid acyl chloride is prepared by chemical treating glycine with phosphorus pentachloride (PCl_{5}) in chloroform.

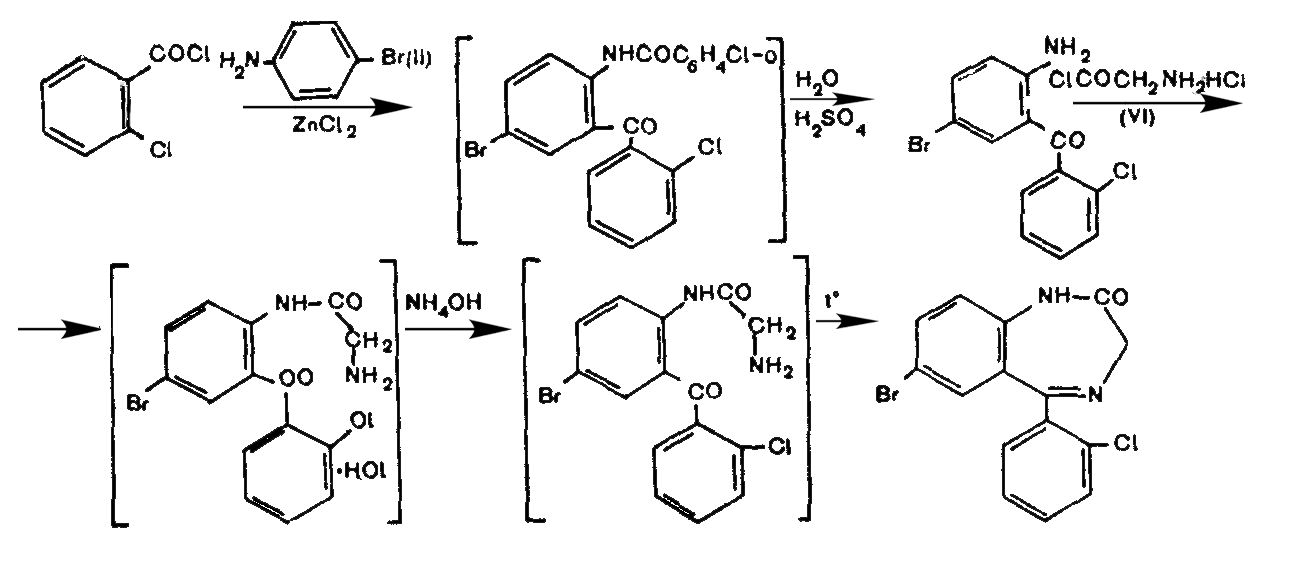

This method of Phenazepam synthesis was developed in the 1970s at the Physico-Chemical Institute of the Academy of Sciences of the Ukrainian SSR.

== Detection in biological fluids ==
Phenazepam may be measured in blood or plasma by chromatographic methods. Blood phenazepam concentrations are typically less than 30 μg/L during therapeutic usage, but have frequently been in the 100–600 μg/L range in automotive vehicle operators arrested for impaired driving ability.

== Society and culture ==
=== Legal status ===
==== China ====
As of October 2015, phenazepam is a controlled substance in China.

==== United States ====
Under federal United States law, phenazepam is not currently classified as a controlled substance, as the Federal Analog Act only provides for automatic assumed classification of chemicals "substantially similar" to existing Schedule I or Schedule II drugs, whereas all controlled benzodiazepines under the Controlled Substances Act are classified as Schedule IV. Although phenazepam is currently not controlled, sale for human use remains illegal in the United States. Suppliers attempt to circumvent this regulation by placing a "Not for human use" disclaimer on the product's label.

Individual states in the United States often ban these analog drugs by name as they appear. Since 2012, Louisiana has classified phenazepam as a controlled dangerous substance. This ban affects several products, some of which were sold at retail stores under the guise of air freshener or similar, containing phenazepam yet claiming not to be for human use. This legislation was introduced after one such product, branded as "Zannie" and marketed as an air freshener rapidly gained publicity as the subject of numerous media reports, attracting the attention of officials. The ensuing investigation effort, led by Senator Fred Mills and Louisiana Poison Center Director Mark Ryan, positively identified the active ingredient of "Zannie" as phenazepam. According to Ryan, chemical analysis identified the active ingredient as "100 percent phenazepam".

Paul Halverson, director and state health officer for the Arkansas Department of Health, approved an emergency rule to ban the sale and distribution of phenazepam shortly after the Louisiana ban.

Alabama made phenazepam a Schedule I substance on March 18, 2014.

==== United Kingdom ====
Phenazepam is a class C drug in the UK.

The UK Home Office banned importation of phenazepam on Friday 22 July 2011 while it drafted legislation, released in January 2012 to become law at the end of March 2012. The bill was quashed following advice from the ACMD as it included two non-abusable steroids. There was a new discussion about its fate on April 23, 2012, where it was decided that the bill would be rewritten and phenazepam would still be banned.

It was eventually banned on June 13, 2012 as a class C, schedule II drug.

==== Elsewhere ====
Phenazepam was classified as a narcotic in Finland in July 2014.

Phenazepam is considered a narcotic in Norway, as per a March 23, 2010 Health Department addition to the Regular Narcotic List.

In Russia, phenazepam is a controlled substance since March 22, 2021.

In Estonia, phenazepam is a Schedule IV substance under the Narcotic Drugs and Psychotropic Substances Act. Schedule IV is the lowest classification of psychoactive substances in Estonia. It includes prescribable drugs, including other benzodiazepines.

==== UN Single Convention on Narcotic Drugs ====
On 8 March 2016 at its 59th Session, the Commission on Narcotic Drugs (CND) added Phenazepam to relevant schedules of the Convention on Psychtropic Substances of 1971.

=== Trade names ===
RU:

- «Феназепам» (Phenazepam) tablets 0.5, 1 and 2.5 mg, solution for intramuscular and intravenous injection 1 mg/mL (0.1%)
- «Элзепам» (Elzepam) tablets 0.5 and 1 mg, solution for intramuscular and intravenous injection 1 mg/mL (0.1%)
- «Фензитат» (Phenzitat) tablets 0.5 and 1 mg
- «Фенорелаксан» (Phenorelaxan) tablets 0.5 and 1 mg, solution for intramuscular and intravenous injection 1 mg/mL (0.1%)
- «Транквезипам» (Trankvezipam) tablets 0.5 and 1 mg, solution for intramuscular and intravenous injection 1 mg/mL (0.1%)
- «Фезипам» (Phezipam) tablets 0.5 and 1 mg (not to be confused with «Фезам» (Phezam) which contains cinnarizine/piracetam)
- «Фезанеф» (Phezanef) tablets 1 mg

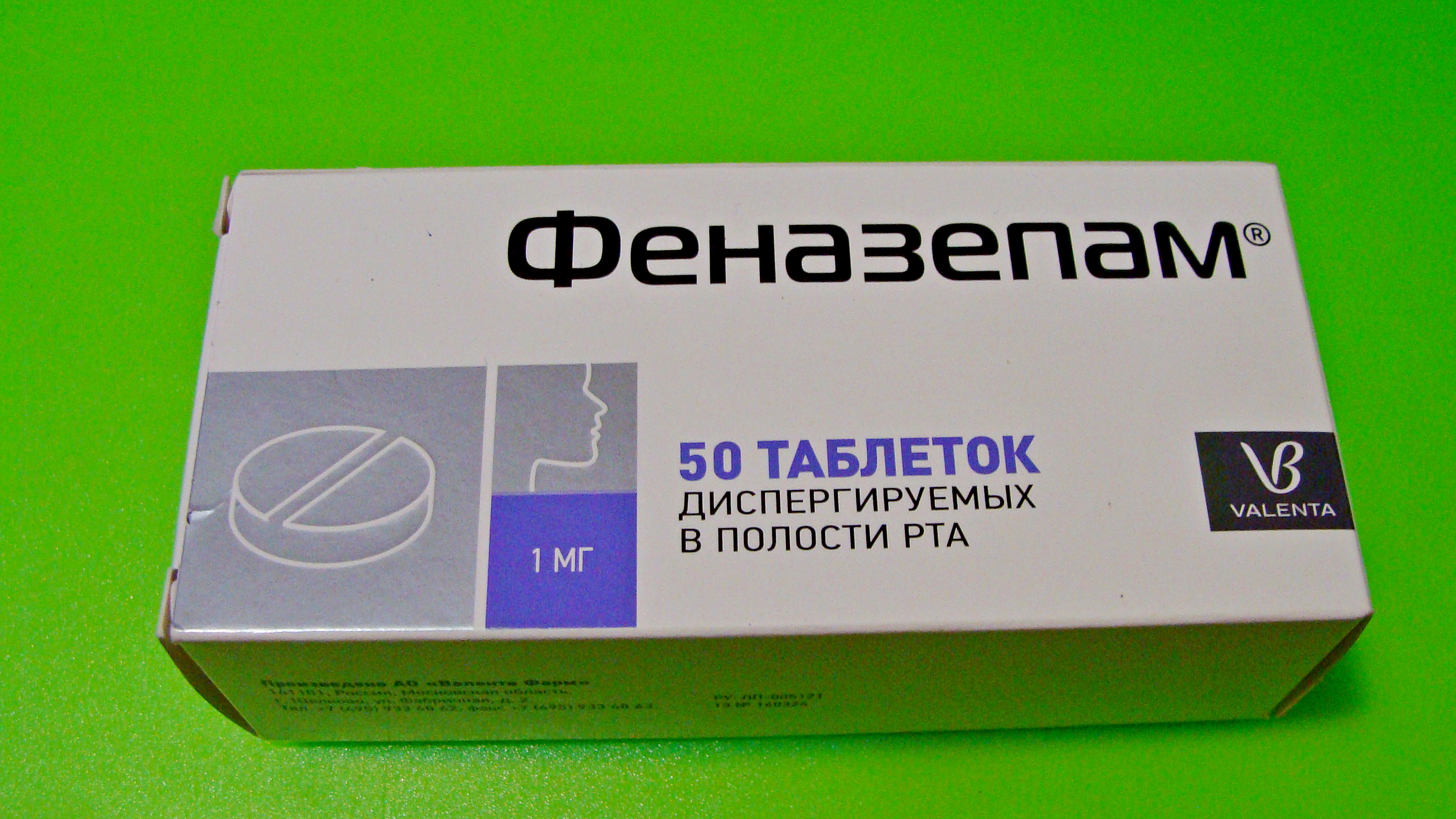
Phenazepam sold in Russia

== See also ==
- 3-Hydroxyphenazepam – an active metabolite and a designer drug
- Delorazepam – 7-chlorinated analog
- Flubromazepam
- Ro07-9749
- List of Russian drugs
