= Loprazolam =

Benzodiazepine

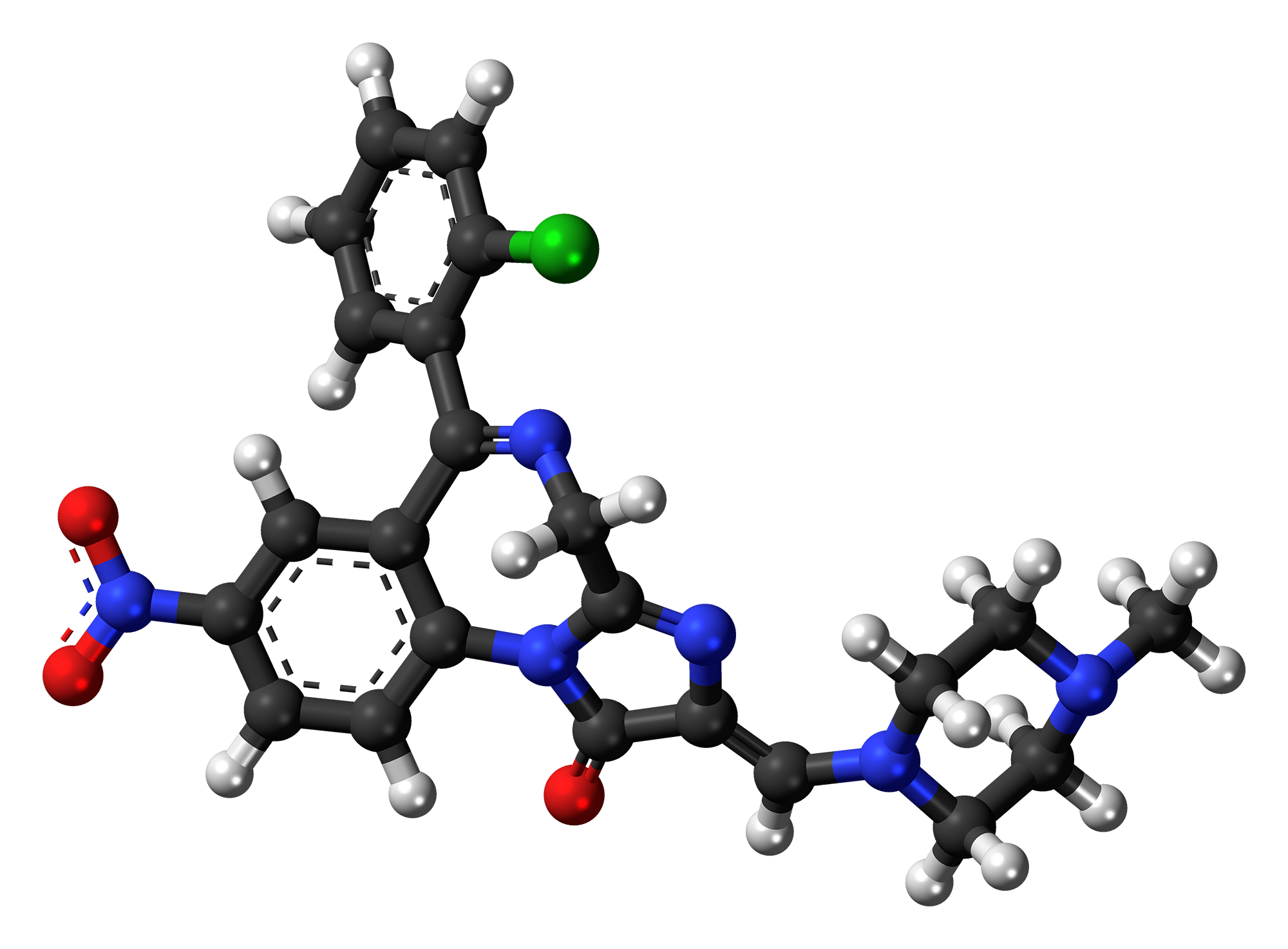

Clinical data
- Trade names: Dormonoct, Havlane, Sonin, Somnovit, others
- AHFS/Drugs.com: International Drug Names
- Pregnancy category: D
- Routes of administration: Oral
- ATC code: N05CD11 (WHO)

Legal status
- Legal status: BR: Class B1 (Psychoactive drugs); CA: Schedule IV; DE: Prescription only (Anlage III for higher doses); US: Schedule IV

Pharmacokinetic data
- Metabolism: Hepatic
- Elimination half-life: 6–12 hours
- Excretion: Renal

Identifiers
- IUPAC name: (2Z)-6-(2-Chlorophenyl)-2-[(4-methyl-1-piperazinyl)methylene]-8-nitro-2,4-dihydro-1H-imidazo[1,2-a][1,4]benzodiazepin-1-one
- CAS Number: 61197-73-7
- PubChem CID: 3033860
- DrugBank: DB13643
- ChemSpider: 2298440
- UNII: 759N8462G8
- KEGG: D07326
- CompTox Dashboard (EPA): DTXSID30894873
- ECHA InfoCard: 100.293.781

Chemical and physical data
- Formula: C_{23}H_{21}ClN_{6}O_{3}
- Molar mass: 464.91 g·mol^{−1}
- 3D model (JSmol): Interactive image
- SMILES: [O-][N+](=O)c1cc4c(cc1)N/2C(=O)C(\N=C\2C/N=C4/c3ccccc3Cl)=C\N5CCN(C)CC5
- InChI: InChI=1S/C23H21ClN6O3/c1-27-8-10-28(11-9-27)14-19-23(31)29-20-7-6-15(30(32)33)12-17(20)22(25-13-21(29)26-19)16-4-2-3-5-18(16)24/h2-7,12,14H,8-11,13H2,1H3/b19-14-; Key:UTEFBSAVJNEPTR-RGEXLXHISA-N

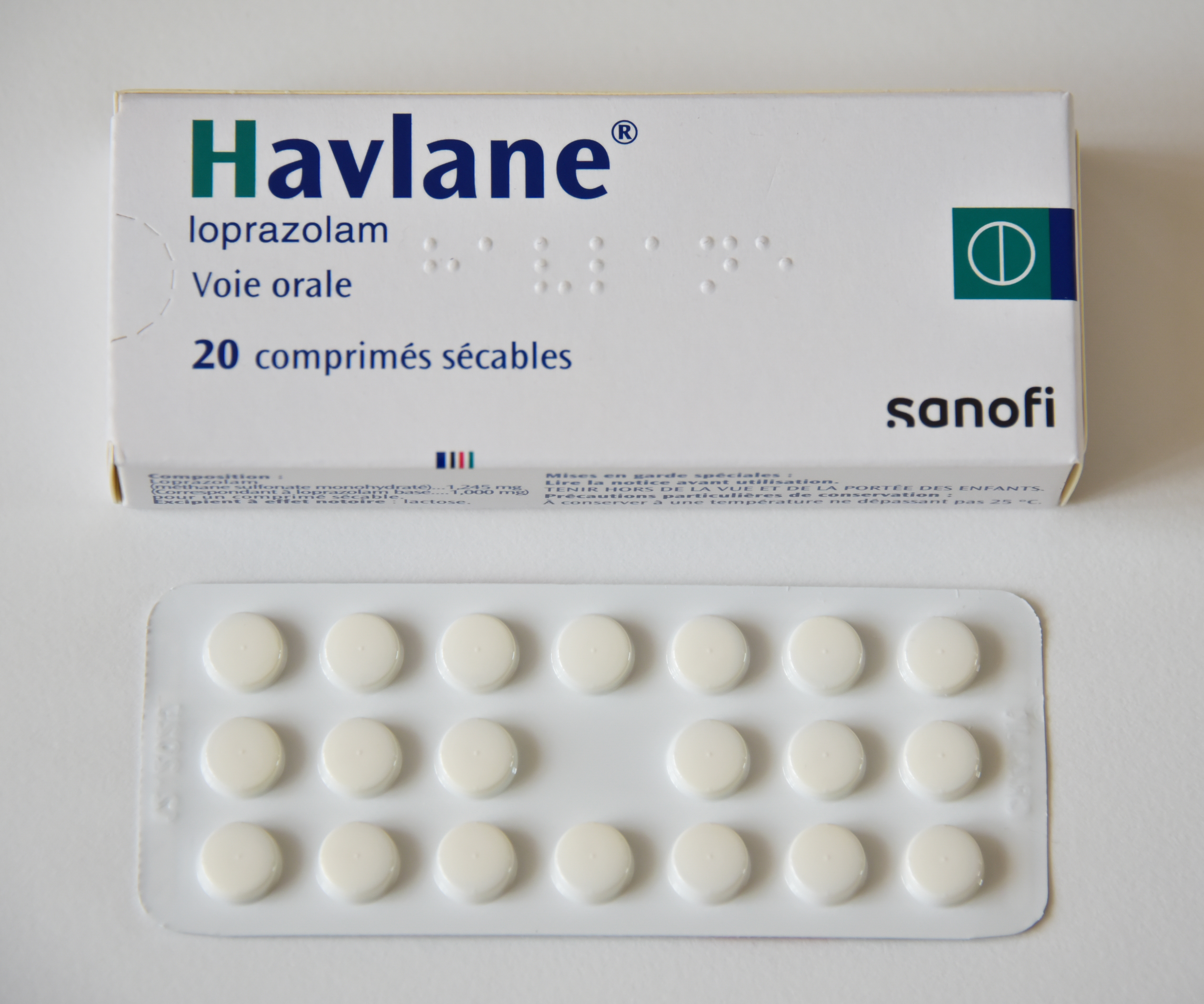
French Havlane (loprazolam 1 mg) packaging and blister

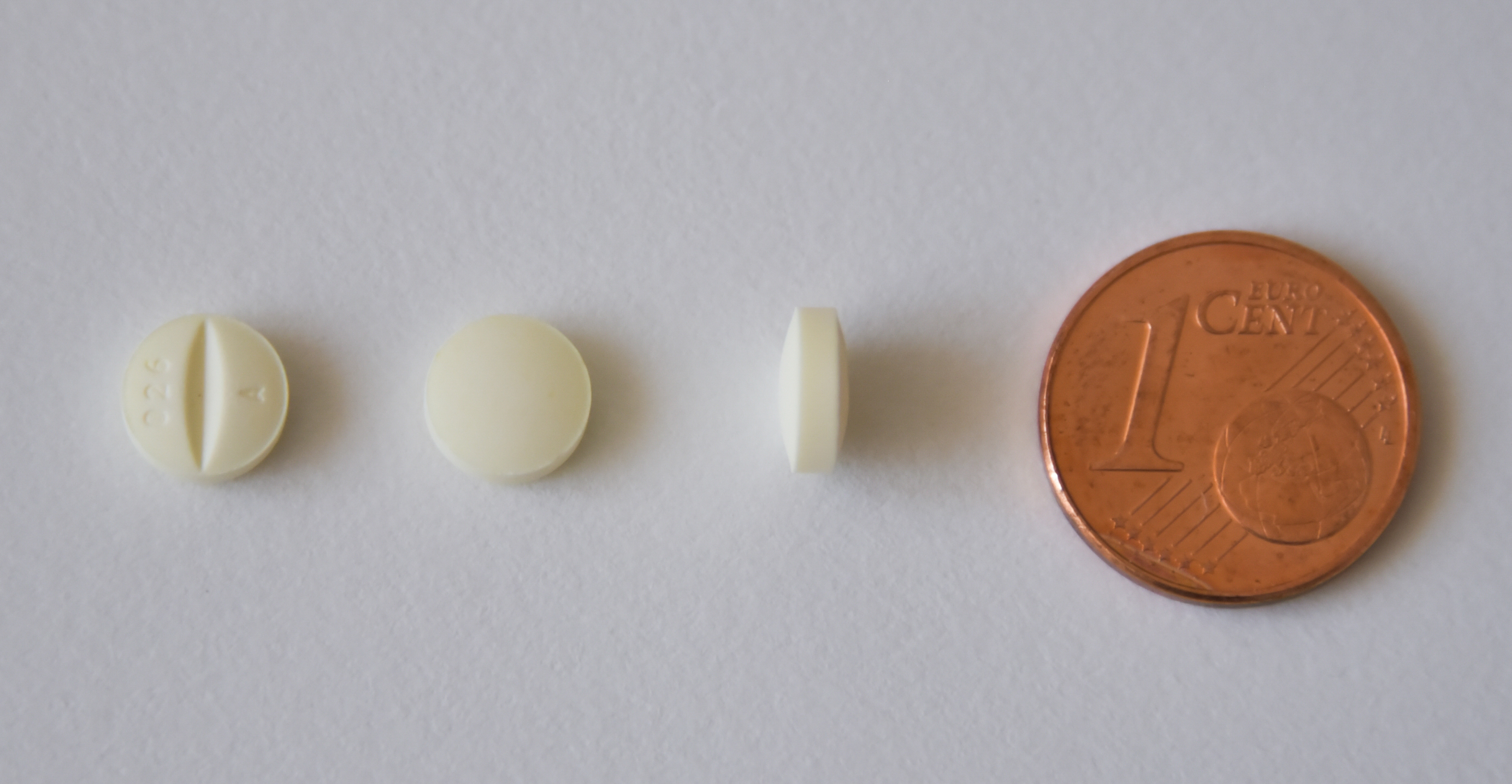
French Havlane (loprazolam 1 mg) pills

Loprazolam (triazulenone) marketed under many brand names is a benzodiazepine medication. It possesses anxiolytic, anticonvulsant, hypnotic, sedative and skeletal muscle relaxant properties. It is licensed and marketed for the short-term treatment of moderately-severe insomnia.

It was patented in 1975 and came into medical use in 1983. It is not approved by the FDA in the United States. It is available as a prescription medicine in the United Kingdoms.

== Medical uses ==
Insomnia can be described as a difficulty falling asleep, frequent awakening, early awakenings or a combination of each. Loprazolam is a short-acting benzodiazepine and is sometimes used in patients who have difficulty in maintaining sleep or have difficulty falling asleep. Hypnotics should only be used on a short-term basis or in those with chronic insomnia on an occasional basis.

=== Dose ===
The dose of loprazolam for insomnia is usually 1 mg but can be increased to 2 mg if necessary. In the elderly a lower dose is recommended due to more pronounced effects and a significant impairment of standing up to 11 hours after dosing of 1 mg of loprazolam. The half-life is much more prolonged in the elderly than in younger patients. A half-life of 19.8 hours has been reported in elderly patients. Patients and prescribing physicians should, however, bear in mind that higher doses of loprazolam may impair long-term memory functions.

== Side effects ==
Side effects of loprazolam are generally the same as for other benzodiazepines such as diazepam. The most significant difference in side effects of loprazolam and diazepam is it is less prone to day time sedation as the half-life of loprazolam is considered to be intermediate whereas diazepam has a very long half-life. The side effects of loprazolam are the following:

- drowsiness
- paradoxical increase in aggression
- lightheadedness
- confusion
- muscle weakness
- ataxia (particularly in the elderly)
- amnesia
- headache
- vertigo
- hypotension
- salivation changes
- gastro-intestinal disturbances
- visual disturbances
- dysarthria
- tremor
- changes in libido
- incontinence
- urinary retention
- blood disorders and jaundice
- skin reactions
- dependence and withdrawal reactions

Residual 'hangover' effects after nighttime administration of loprazolam such as sleepiness, impaired psychomotor and cognitive functions may persist into the next day which may increase risks of falls and hip fractures.

=== Tolerance, dependence and withdrawal ===
Loprazolam, like all other benzodiazepines, is recommended only for the short-term management of insomnia in the UK, owing to the risk of serious adverse effects such as tolerance, dependence and withdrawal, as well as adverse effects on mood and cognition. Benzodiazepines can become less effective over time, and patients can develop increasing physical and psychological adverse effects, e.g., agoraphobia, gastrointestinal complaints, and peripheral nerve abnormalities such as burning and tingling sensations.

Loprazolam has a low risk of physical dependence and withdrawal if it is used for less than 4 weeks or very occasionally. However, one placebo-controlled study comparing 3 weeks of treatment for insomnia with either loprazolam or triazolam showed rebound anxiety and insomnia occurring 3 days after discontinuing loprazolam therapy, whereas with triazolam the rebound anxiety and insomnia was seen the next day. The differences between the two are likely due to the differing elimination half-lives of the two drugs. These results would suggest that loprazolam and possibly other benzodiazepines should be prescribed for 1–2 weeks rather than 2–4 weeks to reduce the risk of physical dependence, withdrawal, and rebound phenomenon.

Withdrawal symptoms

Slow reduction of the dosage over a period of months at a rate that the individual can tolerate greatly minimizes the severity of the withdrawal symptoms. Individuals who are benzodiazepine dependent often cross to an equivalent dose of diazepam to taper gradually, as diazepam has a longer half-life and small dose reductions can be achieved more easily.

- anxiety and panic attacks
- sweating
- nightmares
- insomnia
- headache
- tremor
- nausea and vomiting
- feelings of unreality
- abnormal sensation of movement
- hypersensitivity to stimuli
- hyperventilation
- flushing
- sweating
- palpitations
- dimensional distortions of rooms and television pictures
- paranoid thoughts and feelings of persecution
- depersonalization
- fears of going mad
- heightened perception of taste, smell, sound, and light; photophobia
- agoraphobia
- clinical depression
- poor memory and concentration
- aggression
- excitability
- somatic symptoms
- numbness
- altered sensations of the skin
- pain
- stiffness
- weakness in the neck, head, jaw, and limbs
- muscle fasciculation, ranging from twitches to jerks, affecting the legs or shoulders
- ataxia
- paraesthesia
- influenza-like symptoms
- blurred double vision
- menorrhagia
- loss of or dramatic gain in appetite
- thirst with polyuria
- urinary incontinence
- dysphagia
- abdominal pain
- diarrhoea
- constipation

Major complications can occur after abrupt or rapid withdrawal, especially from high doses, producing symptoms such as:

- psychosis
- confusion
- visual and auditory hallucinations
- delusions
- epileptic seizures (which may be fatal)
- suicidal thoughts or actions
- abnormal, often severe, drug seeking behavior

It has been estimated that between 30% and 50% of long-term users of benzodiazepines will experience withdrawal symptoms. However, up to 90% of patients withdrawing from benzodiazepines experienced withdrawal symptoms in one study, but the rate of taper was very fast at 25% of dose per week. Withdrawal symptoms tend to last between 3 weeks to 3 months, although 10–15% of people may experience a protracted benzodiazepine withdrawal syndrome with symptoms persisting and gradually declining over a period of many months and occasionally several years.

== Contraindications and special caution ==
Benzodiazepines require special precaution if used in the elderly, during pregnancy, in children, alcohol or drug-dependent individuals and individuals with comorbid psychiatric disorders. Loprazolam, similar to other benzodiazepines and nonbenzodiazepine hypnotic drugs causes impairments in body balance and standing steadiness in individuals who wake up at night or the next morning. Falls and hip fractures are frequently reported. The combination with alcohol increases these impairments. Partial, but incomplete tolerance develops to these impairments.

== Mechanism of action ==
Loprazolam is a benzodiazepine, which acts via positively modulating the GABA_{A} receptor complex via a binding to the benzodiazepine receptor which is situated on alpha subunit containing GABA_{A} receptors. This action enhances the effect of the neurotransmitter GABA on the GABA_{A} receptor complex by increasing the opening frequency of the chloride ion channel. This action allows more chloride ions to enter the neuron which in turn produces such effects as; muscle relaxation, anxiolytic, hypnotic, amnesic and anticonvulsant action. These properties can be used for therapeutic benefit in clinical practice. These properties are also sometimes used for recreational purposes in the form of drug abuse of benzodiazepines where high doses are used to achieve intoxication and or sedation.

== Pharmacokinetics ==
After oral administration of loprazolam, it takes about 3 hours and a half for serum concentration levels of loprazolam plus its active metabolite piperazine N-Oxide to peak (source https://www.medicines.org.uk/emc/product/4192/smpc, significantly longer than other benzodiazepine hypnotics. This delay brings into question the benefit of loprazolam for the treatment of insomnia when compared to other hypnotics (particularly when the major complaint is difficulty falling asleep instead of difficulty maintaining sleep for the entire night), although some studies show that loprazolam may induce sleep within half an hour, indicating rapid penetration into the brain. The peak plasma delay of loprazolam, therefore, may not be relevant to loprazolam's efficacy as a hypnotic. If taken after a meal it can take even longer for loprazolam plasma levels to peak and peak levels may be lower than normal. Loprazolam significantly alters electrical activity in the brain as measured by EEG, with these changes becoming more pronounced as the dose increases. Roughly half of each dose is metabolized in humans to produce an active metabolite, (a piperazine with lesser potency), the other half is excreted unchanged. The half-life of the active metabolite is about the same as the parent compound loprazolam.

== See also ==
- Benzodiazepine
- List of benzodiazepines
- Benzodiazepine dependence
- Benzodiazepine withdrawal syndrome
- Heather Ashton
- Long-term effects of benzodiazepines
