= Benzodiazepine dependence =

- Other names: Benzodiazepine addiction
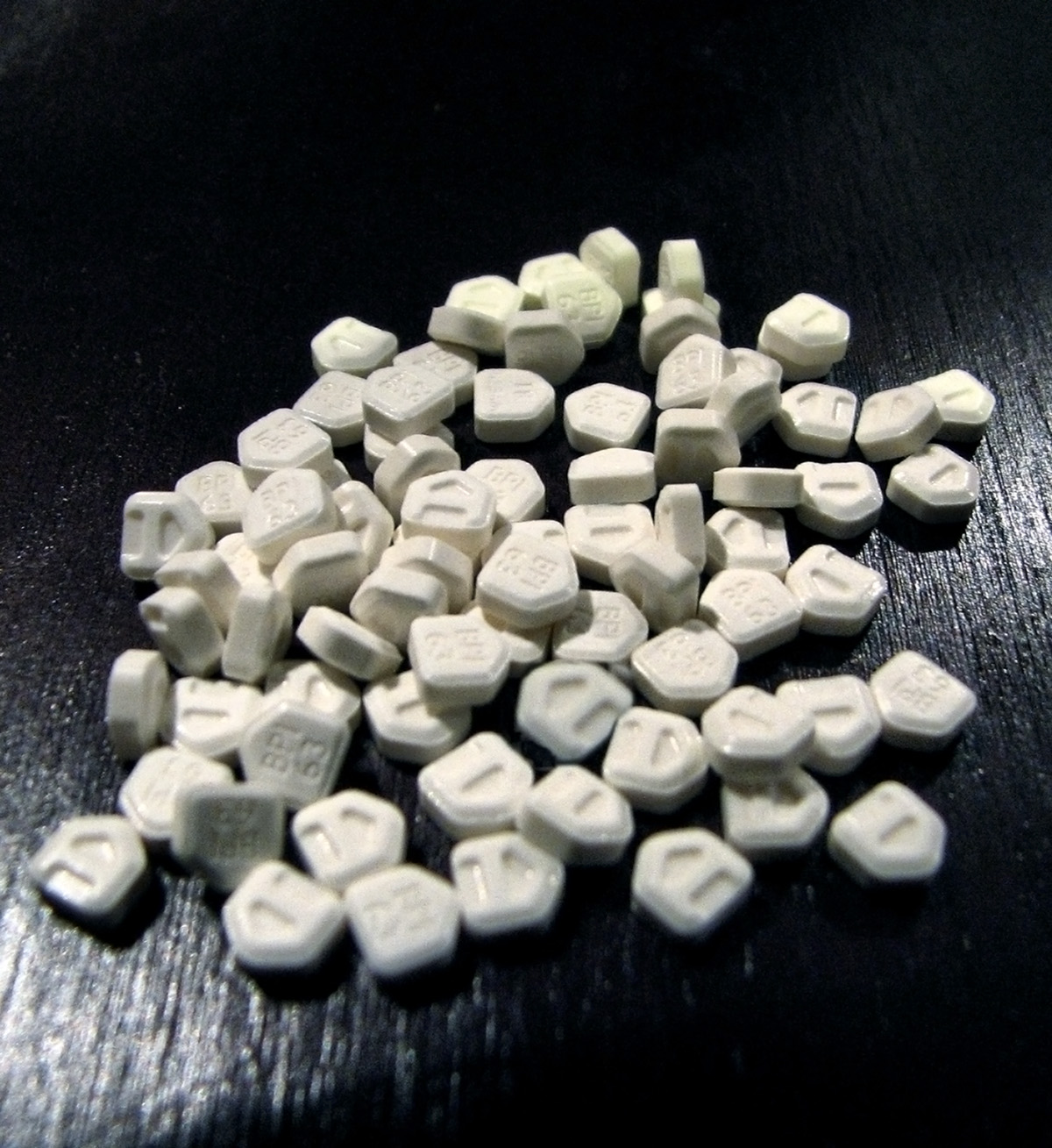
- Lorazepam (Ativan) tablets
- Specialty: Addiction Medicine
- Complications: Benzodiazepine overdose

Benzodiazepine dependence (BZD dependence) defines a situation in which one has developed one or more of either tolerance, withdrawal symptoms, drug seeking behaviors, such as continued use despite harmful effects, and maladaptive pattern of substance use, according to the DSM-IV. In the case of benzodiazepine dependence, the continued use seems to be typically associated with the avoidance of unpleasant withdrawal reaction rather than with the pleasurable effects of the drug. Benzodiazepine dependence develops with long-term use, even at low therapeutic doses, often without the described drug seeking behavior and tolerance.

Addiction consists of people misusing or craving the drug, not to relieve withdrawal symptoms, but to experience its euphoric or intoxicating effects. It is necessary to distinguish between addiction to and abuse of benzodiazepines, and physical dependence on them. The increased GABA inhibition on the neural systems caused by benzodiazepines is counteracted by the body's development of tolerance to the drug's effects; the development of tolerance occurs as a result of neuroadaptations, which result in decreased GABA activity and increased excitability of the glutamate system; these adaptations occur as a result of the body trying to overcome the central nervous system depressant effects of the drug to restore homeostasis. When benzodiazepines are stopped, these neuroadaptations are "unmasked" leading to hyper-excitability of the nervous system and the appearance of withdrawal symptoms.

Therapeutic dose dependence is the largest category of people dependent on benzodiazepines. These individuals typically do not escalate their doses to high levels and generally use their medication as intended by their prescriber. Smaller groups include patients escalating their dosage to higher levels and drug misusers as well. Tolerance develops within days or weeks to the anticonvulsant, hypnotic, muscle relaxant and after 4 months there is little evidence that benzodiazepines retain their anxiolytic properties. Some authors, however, disagree and feel that benzodiazepines retain their anxiolytic properties. Long-term benzodiazepine treatment may remain necessary in certain clinical conditions.

Numbers of benzodiazepine prescriptions have been declining, due primarily to concerns of dependence. In the short term, benzodiazepines can be effective drugs for acute anxiety or insomnia. With longer-term use, other therapies, both pharmacological and psychotherapeutic, become more effective. This is in part due to the greater effectiveness over time of other forms of therapy, and also due to the eventual development of pharmacological benzodiazepine tolerance.

== Signs and symptoms ==
The signs and symptoms of benzodiazepine dependence include feeling unable to cope without the drug, unsuccessful attempts to cut down or stop benzodiazepine use, tolerance to the effects of benzodiazepines, and withdrawal symptoms when not taking the drug. Some withdrawal symptoms that may appear include anxiety, depressed mood, depersonalization, derealization, sleep disturbance, hypersensitivity to touch and pain, tremor, shakiness, muscular aches, pains, twitches, and headache. Benzodiazepine dependence and withdrawal have been associated with suicide and self-harming behaviors, especially in young people. The Department of Health substance misuse guidelines recommend monitoring for mood disorder in those dependent on or withdrawing from benzodiazepines.

Benzodiazepine dependence is a frequent complication for those prescribed for or using for longer than four weeks, with physical dependence and withdrawal symptoms being the most common problem, but also occasionally drug-seeking behavior. Withdrawal symptoms include anxiety, perceptual disturbances, distortion of all the senses, dysphoria, and, in rare cases, psychosis and epileptic seizures.

=== Elderly ===
Long-term use and benzodiazepine dependence is a serious problem in the elderly. Failure to treat benzodiazepine dependence in the elderly can cause serious medical complications. The elderly have less cognitive reserve and are more sensitive to the short (e.g., in between dose withdrawal) and protracted withdrawal effects of benzodiazepines, as well as the side-effects both from short-term and long-term use. This can lead to excessive contact with their doctor. Research has found that withdrawing elderly people from benzodiazepines leads to a significant reduction in doctor visits per year, it is presumed, due to an elimination of drug side-effects and withdrawal effects.

Tobacco and alcohol are the most common substances that elderly individuals develop dependence on or misuse. The next-most-common substance that elderly people develop a drug dependence to or misuse is benzodiazepines. Drug-induced cognitive problems can have serious consequences for elderly people and can lead to confusional states and "pseudo-dementia". About 10% of elderly patients referred to memory clinics actually have a drug-induced cause that most often is benzodiazepines. Benzodiazepines have also been linked to an increased risk of road traffic accidents and falls in the elderly. The long-term effects of benzodiazepines are still not fully understood. Long-term benzodiazepine use is associated with attentional and visuospatial functional impairments. Withdrawal from benzodiazepines can lead to improved alertness and decreased forgetfulness in the elderly. Withdrawal led to statistically significant improvements in memory function and performance-related skills in those having withdrawn successfully from benzodiazepines, whereas those having remained on benzodiazepines experienced worsening symptoms. People having withdrawn from benzodiazepines also felt their sleep was more refreshing, making statements such as "I feel sharper when I wake up" or "I feel better, more awake", or "It used to take me an hour to fully wake up." This suggests that benzodiazepines may actually make insomnia worse in the elderly.

== Cause ==
Tolerance occurs to the muscle-relaxant, anticonvulsant, and sleep-inducing effects of benzodiazepines, and upon cessation a benzodiazepine withdrawal syndrome can occur. In a study of long term diazepam use, withdrawal phenomena occurred in 5% of patients taking diazepam for less than 8 months and 43% of patients taking diazepam for more than 8 months. This can lead to benzodiazepines being taken for longer than originally intended, as people continue to take the drugs over a long period of time to suppress withdrawal symptoms. Some people use benzodiazepines at very high doses and devote a lot of time to doing so, satisfying the diagnostic criteria in DSM V for substance use disorder. Another group of people include those on low to moderate therapeutic doses of benzodiazepines who do not use their benzodiazepines differently than recommended by their prescriber but develop a physical tolerance and benzodiazepine dependence. A considerable number of individuals using benzodiazepines for insomnia escalate their dosage, sometimes above therapeutically-prescribed dose levels.

Tolerance to the anxiolytic effect of benzodiazepines has been clearly demonstrated in rats. However, a review of the mechanisms of benzodiazepine tolerance reported that "tolerance develops relatively quickly for the sedative and anticonvulsant actions of benzodiazepines, whereas tolerance to anxiolytic and amnesic effects probably does not develop at all". A review of clonazepam use in psychiatric disorders reported longitudinal evidence of continued anxiolytic efficacy for up to 3 years, and a meta-analysis of long-term benzodiazepine use found no difference in outcome between benzodiazepines and antidepressants after 8 weeks. However, both reviews lament the paucity of gold-standard RCT evidence.

Some authors disagree, and posit that benzodiazepine therapy is continued merely to prevent rebound and withdrawal as opposed to being continued due to drug efficacy. However, for GAD or PD treatment this conclusion does not appear to align with available evidence, as RCTs out to 22 weeks and observational trials running for substantially longer show HAM-A scores and other standardized anxiety measurements remain significantly below pre-treatment baseline levels without evidence of loss of efficacy.

=== Risk factors ===
The risk factors for benzodiazepine dependence are long-term use beyond four weeks, use of high doses, use of potent short-acting benzodiazepines, dependent personalities, and proclivity for substance use. Use of short-acting benzodiazepines leads to repeated withdrawal effects that are alleviated by the next dose, which reinforce in the individual the dependence. A physical dependence develops more quickly with higher potency benzodiazepines such as alprazolam (Xanax) than with lower potency benzodiazepines such as chlordiazepoxide (Librium).

Symptom severity is worse with the use of high doses, or with benzodiazepines of high potency or short half-life. Other cross-tolerant sedative hypnotics, such as barbiturates or alcohol, increase the risk of benzodiazepine dependence.

== Mechanism ==
=== Tolerance and physical dependence ===
Tolerance develops rapidly to the sleep-inducing effects of benzodiazepines. The anticonvulsant and muscle-relaxant effects last for a few weeks before tolerance develops in most individuals. Tolerance results in a desensitization of GABA receptors and an increased sensitization of the excitatory neurotransmitter system, such as NMDA glutamate receptors. These changes occur as a result of the body trying to overcome the drug's effects. Other changes that occur are the reduction of the number of GABA receptors (downregulation) as well as possibly long-term changes in gene transcription coding of brain cells. The differing speed at which tolerance occurs to the therapeutic effects of benzodiazepines can be explained by the speed of changes in the range of neurotransmitter systems and subsystems that are altered by chronic benzodiazepine use. The various neurotransmitter systems and subsystems may reverse tolerance at different speeds, thus explaining the prolonged nature of some withdrawal symptoms. As a result of a physical dependence that develops due to tolerance, a characteristic benzodiazepine withdrawal syndrome often occurs after removal of the drug or a reduction in dosage. Changes in the expression of neuropeptides such as corticotropin-releasing hormone and neuropeptide Y may play a role in benzodiazepine dependence. Individuals taking daily benzodiazepine drugs have a reduced sensitivity to further additional doses of benzodiazepines. Tolerance to benzodiazepines can be demonstrated by injecting diazepam into long-term users. In normal subjects, increases in growth hormone occurs, whereas, in benzodiazepine-tolerant individuals, this effect is blunted.

Animal studies have shown that repeated withdrawal from benzodiazepines leads to increasingly severe withdrawal symptoms, including an increased risk of seizures; this phenomenon is known as kindling. Kindling phenomena are well established for repeated ethanol (alcohol) withdrawal; alcohol has a very similar mechanism of tolerance and withdrawal to benzodiazepines, involving the GABA_{A}, NMDA, and AMPA receptors.

The shift of benzodiazepine receptors to an inverse agonist state after chronic treatment leads the brain to be more sensitive to excitatory drugs or stimuli. Excessive glutamate activity can result in excitotoxicity, which may result in neurodegeneration. The glutamate receptor subtype NMDA is well known for its role in causing excito-neurotoxicity. The glutamate receptor subtype AMPA is believed to play an important role in neuronal kindling as well as excitotoxicity during withdrawal from alcohol as well as benzodiazepines. It is highly possible that NMDA receptors are involved in the tolerance to some effects of benzodiazepines.

Animal studies have found that glutamergic changes as a result of benzodiazepine use are responsible for a delayed withdrawal syndrome, which in mice peaks 3 days after cessation of benzodiazepines. This was demonstrated by the ability to avoid the withdrawal syndrome by the administration of AMPA antagonists. It is believed that different glutamate subreceptors, e.g., NMDA and AMPA, are responsible for different stages/time points of the withdrawal syndrome. NMDA receptors are upregulated in the brain as a result of benzodiazepine tolerance. AMPA receptors are also involved in benzodiazepine tolerance and withdrawal. A decrease in benzodiazepine binding sites in the brain may also occur as part of benzodiazepine tolerance.

=== Cross tolerance ===
Benzodiazepines share a similar mechanism of action with various sedative compounds that act by enhancing the GABA_{A} receptor. Cross tolerance means that one drug will alleviate the withdrawal effects of another. It also means that tolerance of one drug will result in tolerance of another similarly-acting drug. Benzodiazepines are often used for this reason to detoxify alcohol-dependent patients and can have life-saving properties in preventing or treating severe life-threatening withdrawal syndromes from alcohol, such as delirium tremens. However, although benzodiazepines can be very useful in the acute detoxification of alcoholics, benzodiazepines in themselves act as positive reinforcers in alcoholics, by increasing the desire for alcohol. Low doses of benzodiazepines were found to significantly increase the level of alcohol consumed in alcoholics. Alcoholics dependent on benzodiazepines should not be abruptly withdrawn but be very slowly withdrawn from benzodiazepines, as over-rapid withdrawal is likely to produce severe anxiety or panic, which is well known for being a relapse risk factor in recovering alcoholics.

There is cross tolerance between alcohol, the benzodiazepines, the barbiturates, the nonbenzodiazepine drugs, and corticosteroids, which all act by enhancing the GABA_{A} receptor's function via modulating the chloride ion channel function of the GABA_{A} receptor.

Neuroactive steroids, e.g., progesterone and its active metabolite allopregnanolone, are positive modulators of the GABA_{A} receptor and are cross tolerant with benzodiazepines. The active metabolite of progesterone has been found to enhance the binding of benzodiazepines to the benzodiazepine binding sites on the GABA_{A} receptor. The cross-tolerance between GABA_{A} receptor positive modulators, including benzodiazepines, occurs because of the similar mechanism of action and the subunit changes that occur from chronic use from one or more of these compounds in expressed receptor isoforms. Abrupt withdrawal from any of these compounds, e.g., barbiturates, benzodiazepines, alcohol, corticosteroids, neuroactive steroids, and nonbenzodiazepines, precipitate similar withdrawal effects characterized by central nervous system hyper-excitability, resulting in symptoms such as increased seizure susceptibility and anxiety. While many of the neuroactive steroids do not produce full tolerance to their therapeutic effects, cross-tolerance to benzodiazepines still occurs as had been demonstrated between the neuroactive steroid ganaxolone and diazepam. Alterations of levels of neuroactive steroids in the body during the menstrual cycle, menopause, pregnancy, and stressful circumstances can lead to a reduction in the effectiveness of benzodiazepines and a reduced therapeutic effect. During withdrawal of neuroactive steroids, benzodiazepines become less effective.

=== Physiology of withdrawal ===
Withdrawal symptoms are a normal response in individuals having chronically used benzodiazepines, and an adverse effect and result of drug tolerance. Symptoms typically emerge when dosage of the drug is reduced. GABA is the second-most-common neurotransmitter in the central nervous system (the most common being glutamate) and by far the most abundant inhibitory neurotransmitter; roughly one-quarter to one-third of synapses use GABA. The use of benzodiazepines has a profound effect on almost every aspect of brain and body function, either directly or indirectly.

With chronic benzodiazepine use, tolerance develops rapidly to most of its effects, so that, when benzodiazepines are withdrawn, various neurotransmitter systems go into overdrive due to the lack of inhibitory GABA-ergic activity. Withdrawal symptoms then emerge as a result, and persist until the nervous system physically reverses the adaptions (physical dependence) that have occurred in the CNS.

Withdrawal symptoms typically consist of a mirror image of the drug's effects: Sedative effects and suppression of REM and SWS stages of sleep can be replaced by insomnia, nightmares, and hypnogogic hallucinations; its antianxiety effects are replaced with anxiety and panic; muscle-relaxant effects are replaced with muscular spasms or cramps; and anticonvulsant effects are replaced with seizures, especially in cold turkey or overly-rapid withdrawal.

Benzodiazepine withdrawal represents in part excitotoxicity to brain neurons. Rebound activity of the hypothalamic-pituitary-adrenocortical axis also plays an important role in the severity of benzodiazepine withdrawal. Tolerance and the resultant withdrawal syndrome may be due to alterations in gene expression, which results in long-term changes in the function of the GABAergic neuronal system.

During withdrawal from full or partial agonists, changes occur in benzodiazepine receptor with upregulation of some receptor subtypes and downregulation of other receptor subtypes.

=== Withdrawal ===
Long-term use of benzodiazepines leads to increasing physical and mental health problems, and as a result, discontinuation is recommended for many long-term users. The withdrawal syndrome from benzodiazepines can range from a mild and short-lasting syndrome to a prolonged and severe syndrome. Withdrawal symptoms can lead to continued use of benzodiazepines for many years, long after the original reason for taking benzodiazepines has passed. Many patients know that the benzodiazepines no longer work for them but are unable to discontinue benzodiazepines because of withdrawal symptoms.

Withdrawal symptoms can emerge despite slow reduction but can be reduced by a slower rate of withdrawal. As a result, withdrawal rates have been recommended to be customized to each individual patient. The time needed to withdrawal can vary from a couple of months to a year or more and often depends on length of use, dosage taken, lifestyle, health, and social and environmental stress factors.

Diazepam is often recommended due to its long elimination half-life and also because of its availability in low potency doses. The non-benzodiazepine Z drugs such as zolpidem, zaleplon, and zopiclone should not be used as a replacement for benzodiazepines, as they have a similar mechanism of action and can induce a similar dependence. The pharmacological mechanism of benzodiazepine tolerance and dependence is the internalization (removal) of receptor sites in the brain and changes in gene expression.

With long-term use and during withdrawal of benzodiazepines, treatment-emergent depression and emotional blunting may emerge and sometimes also suicidal ideation. There is evidence that the higher the dose used the more likely it is benzodiazepine use will induce these feelings. Reducing the dose or discontinuing benzodiazepines may be indicated in such cases. Withdrawal symptoms can persist for quite some time after discontinuing benzodiazepines. Some common protracted withdrawal symptoms include anxiety, depression, insomnia, and physical symptoms such as gastrointestinal, neurologic, and musculoskeletal effects. The protracted withdrawal state may still occur despite slow titration of dosage. It is believed that the protracted withdrawal effects are due to persisting neuroadaptations.

== Diagnosis ==
For a diagnosis of benzodiazepine dependence to be made, the ICD-10 requires that at least 3 of the below criteria are met and that they have been present for at least a month, or, if less than a month, that they appeared repeatedly during a 12-month period.

- Behavioral, cognitive, and physiological phenomena that are associated with the repeated use and that typically include a strong desire to take the drug.
- Difficulty controlling use
- Continued use despite harmful consequences
- Preference given to drug use rather than to other activities and obligations
- Increased tolerance to effects of the drug and sometimes a physical withdrawal state.

These diagnostic criteria are good for research purposes, but, in everyday clinical practice, they should be interpreted according to clinical judgement. In clinical practice, benzodiazepine dependence should be suspected in those having used benzodiazepines for longer than a month, in particular, if they are from a high-risk group. The main factors associated with an increased incidence of benzodiazepine dependence include:

- Dose
- Duration
- Concomitant use of antidepressants

Benzodiazepine dependence should be suspected also in individuals having substance use disorders including alcohol, and should be suspected in individuals obtaining their own supplies of benzodiazepines. Benzodiazepine dependence is almost certain in individuals who are members of a tranquilizer self-help group.

Research has found that about 40 percent of people with a diagnosis of benzodiazepine dependence are not aware that they are dependent on benzodiazepines, whereas about 11 percent of people judged not to be dependent believe that they are. When assessing a person for benzodiazepine dependence, asking specific questions rather than questions based on concepts is recommended by experts as the best approach of getting a more accurate diagnosis. For example, asking persons if they "think about the medication at times of the day other than when they take the drug" would provide a more meaningful answer than asking "do you think you are psychologically dependent?". The Benzodiazepine Dependence Self Report Questionnaire is one questionnaire used to assess and diagnose benzodiazepine dependence.

=== Definition ===
Benzodiazepine dependence is the condition resulting from repeated use of benzodiazepine drugs. It can include both a physical dependence as well as a psychological dependence and is typified by a withdrawal syndrome upon a fall in blood plasma levels of benzodiazepines, e.g., during dose reduction or abrupt withdrawal.

== Prevention ==
Due to the risk of developing tolerance, dependence, and adverse health effects, such as cognitive impairment, benzodiazepines are indicated for short-term use only - a few weeks, followed by a gradual dose reduction.

=== The Committee on the Review of Medicines (UK) ===
The Committee on the Review of Medicines carried out a review into benzodiazepines due to significant concerns of tolerance, drug dependence, benzodiazepine withdrawal problems, and other adverse effects and published the results in the British Medical Journal in March 1980. The committee found that benzodiazepines do not have any antidepressant or analgesic properties and are, therefore, unsuitable treatments for conditions such as depression, tension headaches, and dysmenorrhea. Benzodiazepines are also not beneficial in the treatment of psychosis. The committee also recommended against benzodiazepines for use in the treatment of anxiety or insomnia in children.

The committee was in agreement with the Institute of Medicine (USA) and the conclusions of a study carried out by the White House Office of Drug Policy and the National Institute on Drug Abuse (USA) that there is little evidence that long-term use of benzodiazepine hypnotics are beneficial in the treatment of insomnia due to the development of tolerance. Benzodiazepines tend to lose their sleep-promoting properties within 3–14 days of continuous use, and, in the treatment of anxiety, the committee found that there was little convincing evidence that benzodiazepines retains efficacy in the treatment of anxiety after 4 months of continuous use due to the development of tolerance.

The committee found that the regular use of benzodiazepines causes the development of dependence characterized by tolerance to the therapeutic effects of benzodiazepines and the development of the benzodiazepine withdrawal syndrome including symptoms such as anxiety, apprehension, tremors, insomnia, nausea, and vomiting upon cessation of benzodiazepine use. Withdrawal symptoms tend to develop within 24 hours upon cessation of short-acting benzodiazepines, and 3–10 days after cessation of longer-acting benzodiazepines. Withdrawal effects could even occur after treatment lasting only 2 weeks at therapeutic dose levels; however, withdrawal effects tend to occur with habitual use beyond 2 weeks and are more likely the higher the dose. The withdrawal symptoms may appear to be similar to the original condition.

The committee recommended that all benzodiazepine treatment be withdrawn gradually and recommended that benzodiazepine treatment be used only in carefully selected patients and that therapy be limited to short-term use only. It was noted in the review that alcohol can potentiate the central nervous system-depressant effects of benzodiazepines and should be avoided. The central nervous system-depressant effects of benzodiazepines may make driving or operating machinery dangerous, and the elderly are more prone to these adverse effects. High single doses or repeated low doses have been reported to produce hypotonia, poor sucking, and hypothermia in the neonate, and irregularities in the fetal heart. The committee recommended that benzodiazepines be avoided in lactation.

The committee recommended that withdrawal from benzodiazepines be gradual, as abrupt withdrawal from high doses of benzodiazepines may cause confusion, toxic psychosis, convulsions, or a condition resembling delirium tremens. Abrupt withdrawal from lower doses may cause depression, nervousness, rebound insomnia, irritability, sweating, and diarrhea.

== Treatment ==
Benzodiazepines are regarded as a highly addictive drug class. A psychological and physical dependence can develop in as short as a few weeks but may take years to develop in other individuals. Patients wanting to withdraw from benzodiazepines typically receive little advice or support, and such withdrawal should be by small increments over a period of months.

Benzodiazepines are usually prescribed only short-term for the treatment of psychiatric disorders, some medical guidelines posit that there is little evidence to justify long term treatment. However, substantial evidence of benzodiazepine efficacy for long term anxiety treatment exists, including randomized controlled trials lasting several months and observational trials running for years which demonstrate persistent anxiolytic effects.

Long-term benzodiazepine usage is indicated as an adjunct treatment for some seizure disorders. One such example is clobazam, a 1,5-benzodiazepine approved by the FDA in 2013 for the treatment of seizures associated with Lennox-Gastaut syndrome (LGS) in individuals two years or older.

There is no evidence that "drug holidays" or periods of abstinence reduced the risk of dependence; there is evidence from animal studies that such an approach does not prevent dependence from happening. Use of short-acting benzodiazepines is associated with interdose withdrawal symptoms. Kindling has clinical relevance with regard to benzodiazepines; for example, there is an increasing shift to use of benzodiazepines with a shorter half-life and intermittent use, which can result in interdose withdrawal and rebound effects.

=== Cognitive behavioral therapy ===
Cognitive behavioral therapy has been found to be more effective for the long-term management of insomnia than sedative hypnotic drugs. No formal withdrawal programs for benzodiazepines exists with local providers in the UK. Meta-analysis of published data on psychological treatments for insomnia show a success rate between 70 and 80%. A large-scale trial utilizing cognitive behavioral therapy in chronic users of sedative hypnotics including nitrazepam, temazepam, and zopiclone found CBT to be a significantly more effective long-term treatment for chronic insomnia than sedative hypnotic drugs. Persisting improvements in sleep quality, sleep onset latency, increased total sleep, improvements in sleep efficiency, significant improvements in vitality, physical and mental health at 3-, 6-, and 12-month follow-ups were found in those receiving CBT. A marked reduction in total sedative hypnotic drug use was found in those receiving CBT, with 33% reporting zero hypnotic drug use. Age has been found not to be a barrier to successful outcome of CBT. It was concluded that CBT for the management of chronic insomnia is a flexible, practical, and cost-effective treatment, and it was also concluded that CBT leads to a reduction of benzodiazepine drug intake in a significant number of patients.

Chronic use of hypnotic medications is not recommended due to their adverse effects on health and the risk of dependence. A gradual taper is usual clinical course in getting people off of benzodiazepines, but, even with gradual reduction, a large proportion of people fail to stop taking benzodiazepines. The elderly are particularly sensitive to the adverse effects of hypnotic medications. A clinical trial in elderly people dependent on benzodiazepine hypnotics showed that the addition of CBT to a gradual benzodiazepine reduction program increased the success rate of discontinuing benzodiazepine hypnotic drugs from 38% to 77% and at the 12-month follow-up from 24% to 70%. The paper concluded that CBT is an effective tool for reducing hypnotic use in the elderly and reducing the adverse health effects that are associated with hypnotics such as drug dependence, cognitive impairments, and increased road traffic accidents.

A study of patients undergoing benzodiazepine withdrawal who had a diagnosis of generalized anxiety disorder showed that those having received CBT had a very high success rate of discontinuing benzodiazepines compared to those not having receive CBT. This success rate was maintained at the 12-month follow-up. Furthermore, it was found that, in patients having discontinued benzodiazepines, they no longer met the diagnosis of general anxiety disorder, and that the number of patients no longer meeting the diagnosis of general anxiety disorder was higher in the group having received CBT. Thus, CBT can be an effective tool to add to a gradual benzodiazepine dosage reduction program leading to improved and sustained mental health benefits (Disputed).

=== Letter to patients ===
Sending a letter to patients warning of the adverse effects of long-term use of benzodiazepines and recommending dosage reduction has been found to be successful and a cost-effective strategy in reducing benzodiazepine consumption in general practice. Within a year of the letter's going out, there was found to be a 17% fall in the number of benzodiazepines being prescribed, with 5% of patients having totally discontinued benzodiazepines. A study in the Netherlands reported a higher success rate by sending a letter to patients who are benzodiazepine-dependent. The results of the Dutch study reported 11.3% of patients discontinuing benzodiazepines completely within a year.

=== Flumazenil ===
Flumazenil delivered via slow subcutaneous infusion represents a safe procedure for those withdrawing from long-term, high dose benzodiazepine dependency. It has a low risk of seizures even amongst those who have experienced convulsions when previously attempting benzodiazepine withdrawal.

== Epidemiology ==
Research studies have come to different conclusions on the number of therapeutic dose users who develop a physical dependence and withdrawal syndrome. Researches estimate 20-100% (that's a wide range) of patients, taking benzodiazepines at therapeutic dosages for the long term, are physically dependent and will experience withdrawal symptoms.

Benzodiazepines can be addictive and induce dependence even at low doses, with 23% becoming addicted within 3 months of use. Benzodiazepine addiction is considered a public health problem. Approximately 68.5% of prescriptions of benzodiazepines originate from local health centers, with psychiatry and general hospitals accounting for 10% each. A survey of general practitioners reported that the reason for initiating benzodiazepines was due to an empathy for the patients suffering and a lack of other therapeutic options rather than patients demanding them. However, long-term use was more commonly at the insistence of the patient, it is presumed, because physical dependence or addiction had developed.

Approximately twice as many women as men are prescribed benzodiazepines. It is believed that this is largely because men typically turned to alcohol to cope with stress and women to prescription drugs. Biased perception of women by male doctors may also play a role in increased prescribing rates to women; however, increased anxiety features in women does not account for the wide gap alone between men and women.

Based on findings in the US from the Treatment Episode Data Set (TEDS), an annual compilation of patient characteristics in substance use disorder treatment facilities in the United States, admissions due to "primary tranquilizer" (including, but not limited to, benzodiazepine-type) drug use increased 79% from 1992 to 2002.

A study published in the British Journal of General Practice in July 2017 found that in a sample taken from a survey conducted in 2014–2015 in Bradford a mean of 0.69% of registered patients had been prescribed benzodiazepines for more than a year. This would suggest that there were around 300,000 long-term users of diazepine in the UK.

== History ==
Previously, physical dependence on benzodiazepines was largely thought to occur only in people on high-therapeutic-dose ranges. Low- or normal-dose dependence was not suspected until the 1970s, and it was not until the early 1980s that it was confirmed. Low-dose dependence has now been clearly demonstrated in both animal studies and human studies, and is a recognized clinical disadvantage of benzodiazepines. Severe withdrawal syndromes can occur from these low doses of benzodiazepines even after gradual dose reduction. An estimated 30–45% of chronic low-dose benzodiazepine users are dependent and it has been recommended that benzodiazepines even at low dosage be prescribed for a maximum of 7–14 days to avoid dependence. As a result, the global trend is toward strict regulations for the prescription of benzodiazepines due to this risk of low-dose dependence.

Some controversy remains, however, in the medical literature as to the exact nature of low-dose dependence and the difficulty in getting patients to discontinue their benzodiazepines, with some papers attributing the problem to predominantly drug-seeking behavior and drug craving, whereas other papers having found the opposite, attributing the problem to a problem of physical dependence with drug-seeking and craving not being typical of low-dose benzodiazepine users.

== Society and culture ==
=== Misuse and addiction ===
Benzodiazepines are one of the largest classes of illicitly used substances; they are classed as schedule IV controlled drugs in the United States because of their recognized medical uses. Across the world the most frequently diverted and non-medically used benzodiazepines include temazepam, diazepam, nimetazepam, nitrazepam, triazolam, flunitrazepam, midazolam, and in the United States alprazolam, clonazepam, and lorazepam.

Benzodiazepines can cause serious addiction problems. A survey of doctors in Senegal found that many doctors feel that their training and knowledge of benzodiazepines is, in general, poor; a study in Dakar found that almost one-fifth of doctors ignored prescribing guidelines regarding short-term use of benzodiazepines, and almost three-quarters of doctors regarded their training and knowledge of benzodiazepines to be inadequate. More training regarding benzodiazepines has been recommended for doctors. Due to the serious concerns of addiction, national governments were recommended to urgently seek to raise knowledge via training about the addictive nature of benzodiazepines and appropriate prescribing of benzodiazepines.

A six-year study on 51 Vietnam veterans who had a substance use disorder related mainly to stimulants (11 people), opiates (26 people), or benzodiazepines (14 people) was carried out to assess psychiatric symptoms related to the specific substances. After six years, people who used opiates had little change in psychiatric symptomatology; five of the people who used stimulants developed psychosis, and eight of the people who used benzodiazepine developed depression. Therefore, long-term benzodiazepine use and dependence seems to carry a negative effect on mental health, with a significant risk of causing depression. Benzodiazepines are also sometimes taken intra-nasally when not recommended for use this way by their prescriber.

In the elderly, alcohol and benzodiazepines are the most commonly used addictive substances, and the elderly population is more susceptible to benzodiazepine withdrawal syndrome and delirium than are younger patients.

== See also ==
- Long-term effects of benzodiazepines
- Alcohol withdrawal syndrome
- Long-term effects of alcohol consumption
- SSRI discontinuation syndrome
- Drug-related crime
