= Dual diagnosis =

Concurrent mental and substance use disorders

Dual diagnosis (also called co-occurring disorders (COD) or dual pathology) is the condition of having a mental illness and a comorbid substance use disorder. There is considerable debate surrounding the appropriateness of using a single category for a heterogeneous group of individuals with complex needs and a varied range of problems. The concept can be used broadly, for example depression and alcohol use disorder, or it can be restricted to specify severe mental illness (e.g. psychosis, schizophrenia) and substance use disorder (e.g. cannabis use), or a person who has a milder mental illness and a drug dependency, such as panic disorder or generalized anxiety disorder and is dependent on opioids. Diagnosing a primary psychiatric illness in people who use substances is challenging as substance use disorder itself often induces psychiatric symptoms, thus making it necessary to differentiate between substance induced and pre-existing mental illness.

Those with co-occurring disorders face complex challenges. They have increased rates of relapse, hospitalization, homelessness, and HIV and hepatitis C infection compared to those with either mental or substance use disorders alone.

== Differentiating pre-existing and substance induced ==
The identification of substance-induced versus independent psychiatric symptoms or disorders has important treatment implications and often constitutes a challenge in daily clinical practice. Similar patterns of comorbidity and risk factors in individuals with substance induced disorder and those with independent non-substance induced psychiatric symptoms suggest that the two conditions may share underlying etiologic factors.

Substance use disorders, including those of alcohol and prescription medications, can induce a set of symptoms which resembles mental illness, which can make it difficult to differentiate between substance induced psychiatric syndromes and pre-existing mental health problems. More often than not psychiatric disorders among people who use alcohol or illicit substances disappear with prolonged abstinence. Substance induced psychiatric symptoms can occur both in the intoxicated state and also during the withdrawal state. In some cases, these substance induced psychiatric disorders can persist long after detoxification, such as prolonged psychosis or depression after amphetamine or cocaine use. Use of hallucinogens can trigger delusional and other psychotic phenomena long after cessation of use and cannabis may trigger panic attacks during intoxication and with use it may cause a state similar to dysthymia. Severe anxiety and depression are commonly induced by sustained alcohol use which in most cases abates with prolonged abstinence. Even moderate sustained use of alcohol may increase anxiety and depression levels in some individuals. In most cases these drug induced psychiatric disorders fade away with prolonged abstinence. A protracted withdrawal syndrome can also occur with psychiatric and other symptoms persisting for months after cessation of use. Among the currently prevalent medications, benzodiazepines are the most notable drug for inducing prolonged withdrawal effects with symptoms sometimes persisting for years after cessation of use.

Prospective epidemiological studies do not support the hypotheses that comorbidity of substance use disorders with other psychiatric illnesses is primarily a consequence of substance use or dependence or that increasing comorbidity is largely attributable to increasing use of substances. Yet emphasis is often on the effects of substances on the brain creating the impression that dual disorders are a natural consequence of these substances. However, addictive drugs or exposure to gambling will not lead to addictive behaviors or drug dependence in most individuals but only in vulnerable ones, although, according to some researchers, neuroadaptation or regulation of neuronal plasticity, and molecular changes, may alter gene expression in some cases and subsequently lead to substance use disorders.

Research instruments are also often insufficiently sensitive to discriminate between independent, true dual pathology, and substance-induced symptoms. Structured instruments, as Global Appraisal of Individual Needs - Short Screener-GAIN-SS and Psychiatric Research Interview for Substance and Mental Disorders for DSM-IV-PRISM, have been developed to increase the diagnostic validity. While structured instruments can help organize diagnostic information, clinicians must still make judgments on the origin of symptoms.

== Prevalence ==
Comorbidity of addictive disorders and other psychiatric disorders, i.e., dual disorders, is very common and a large body of literature has accumulated demonstrating that mental disorders are strongly associated with substance use disorders. Adolescents and young adults are particularly at risk for dual diagnosis, as early substance use can interfere with brain development and exacerbate emerging mental health conditions. The 2011 USA National Survey on Drug Use and Health found that 17.5% of adults with a mental illness had a co-occurring substance use disorder; this works out to 7.98 million people. Estimates of co-occurring disorders in Canada are even higher, with an estimated 40-60% of adults with a severe and persistent mental illness experiencing a substance use disorder in their lifetime.

A study by Kessler et al. in the United States attempting to assess the prevalence of dual diagnosis found that 47% of clients with schizophrenia had a substance misuse disorder at some time in their life, and the chances of developing a substance misuse disorder was significantly higher among patients with a psychotic illness than in those without a psychotic illness.

Another study looked at the extent of substance misuse in a group of 187 chronically mentally ill patients living in the community. According to the clinician's ratings, around a third of the sample used alcohol, street drugs, or both during the six months before evaluation.

Further UK studies have shown slightly more moderate rates of substance misuse among mentally ill individuals. One study found that individuals with schizophrenia showed just a 7% prevalence of problematic drug use in the year prior to being interviewed and 21% reported problematic use some time before that.

Wright and colleagues identified individuals with psychotic illnesses who had been in contact with services in the London borough of Croydon over the previous 6 months. Cases of alcohol or substance misuse and dependence were identified through standardized interviews with clients and keyworkers. Results showed that prevalence rates of dual diagnosis were 33% for the use of any substance, 20% for alcohol misuse only and 5% for drug misuse only. A lifetime history of any illicit drug use was observed in 35% of the sample.

== Diagnosis ==
Substance use disorders can be confused with other psychiatric disorders. There are diagnoses for substance-induced mood disorders and substance-induced anxiety disorders and thus such overlap can be complicated. For this reason, the DSM-IV advises that diagnoses of primary psychiatric disorders not be made in the absence of sobriety (of a duration sufficient to allow for any substance-induced post-acute-withdrawal symptoms to dissipate) up to 1 year.

== Treatment ==
Only a small proportion of those with co-occurring disorders actually receive treatment for both disorders. Therefore, it was argued that a new approach is needed to enable clinicians, researchers and managers to offer adequate assessment and evidence-based treatments to patients with dual pathology, who cannot be adequately and efficiently managed by cross-referral between psychiatric and addiction services as currently configured and resourced. In 2011, it was estimated that only 12.4% of American adults with co-occurring disorders were receiving both mental health and addictions treatment. Clients with co-occurring disorders face challenges accessing treatment, as they may be excluded from mental health services if they admit to a substance use problem and vice versa.

There are multiple approaches to treat concurrent disorders. Partial treatment involves treating only the disorder that is considered primary. Sequential treatment involves treating the primary disorder first, and then treating the secondary disorder after the primary disorder has been stabilized. Parallel treatment involves the client receiving mental health services from one provider, and addictions services from another.

Integrated treatment involves a seamless blending of interventions into a single coherent treatment package developed with a consistent philosophy and approach among care providers. With this approach, both disorders are considered primary. Integrated treatment can improve accessibility, service individualization, engagement in treatment, treatment compliance, mental health symptoms, and overall outcomes. The Substance Abuse and Mental Health Services Administration in the United States describes integrated treatment as being in the best interests or clients, programs, funders, and systems. Green suggested that treatment should be integrated, and a collaborative process between the treatment team and the patient. Furthermore, recovery should to be viewed as a marathon rather than a sprint, and methods and outcome goals should be explicit. Comprehensive integrated programs commonly combine pharmacotherapy with psychosocial interventions, continuous and coordinated assessment, and long-term relapse-prevention support, with the intensity of services matched to a client's stage of readiness for change.

A 2019 Cochrane meta-analysis that included 41 randomized controlled trials found no high-quality evidence in support of any one psycho-social intervention over standard care for outcomes such as remaining in treatment, reduction in substance use and/or improvement in global functioning and mental status.

== Theories of dual diagnosis ==
There are a number of theories that explain the relationship between mental illness and substance use.

=== Causality ===
The causality theory suggests that certain types of substance use may causally lead to mental illness.

There is strong evidence that using cannabis can produce psychotic, including cannabis-induced psychotic disorder, and affective experiences. When it comes to persisting effects, there is a clear increase in the incidence of psychotic outcomes in people who had used cannabis, even when they had used it only once. More frequent use of cannabis strongly augmented the risk for psychosis. The evidence for affective outcomes is less strong. However, this connection between cannabis and psychosis does not prove that cannabis causes psychotic disorders. The causality theory for cannabis has been challenged as despite explosive increases in cannabis consumption over the past 40 years in western society, the rate of schizophrenia (and psychosis in general) has remained relatively stable.

=== Attention-deficit hyperactivity disorder ===
One in four people who have a substance use disorder also have attention-deficit hyperactivity disorder, which makes the treatment of both conditions more difficult. ADHD is associated with an increased craving for drugs. Having ADHD makes it more likely that an individual will initiate substance misuse at a younger age than their peers. They are also more likely to experience poorer outcomes, such as longer time to remission, and to have increased psychiatric complications from substance misuse. While generally stimulant medications do not seem to worsen substance use, they are known to be non-medically used in some cases. Psychosocial therapy and/or nonstimulant medications and extended release stimulants are ADHD treatment options that reduce these risks.

=== Autism spectrum disorder ===
Unlike ADHD, which significantly increases the risk of substance use disorder, autism spectrum disorder has the opposite effect of significantly reducing the risk of substance use. This is because introversion, inhibition and lack of sensation seeking personality traits, which are typical of autism spectrum disorder, protect against substance use and thus substance use levels are low in individuals who are on the autism spectrum. However, certain forms of substance use disorders, especially alcohol use disorder, can cause or worsen certain neuropsychological symptoms which are common to autism spectrum disorder. This includes impaired social skills due to the neurotoxic effects of alcohol on the brain, especially in the prefrontal cortex area of the brain. The social skills that are impaired by alcohol use disorder include impairments in perceiving facial emotions, prosody perception problems and theory of mind deficits; the ability to understand humour is also impaired in people who consume excessive amounts of alcohol.

=== Gambling ===
The inclusion of behavioral addictions like pathological gambling must change our way of understanding and dealing with addictions. Pathological (disordered) gambling has commonalities in clinical expression, etiology, comorbidity, physiology and treatment with substance use disorders (DSM-5). A challenge is to understand the development of compulsivity at a neurochemical level not only for drugs.

=== Past exposure to psychiatric medications theory ===
The past exposure theory suggests that exposure to psychiatric medication alters neural synapses, introducing an imbalance that was not previously present. Discontinuation of the drug is expected to result in symptoms of psychiatric illness which resolve once the drug is restarted. This theory suggests that while it may appear that the medication is working, it is only treating a disorder caused by the medication itself. New exposure to psychiatric medication may lead to heightened sensitivity to the effects of drugs such as alcohol, which has a deteriorating effect on the patient.

=== Self-medication theory ===
The self-medication theory suggests that people with severe mental illnesses misuse substances in order to relieve a specific set of symptoms and counter the negative side-effects of antipsychotic medication.

Khantizan proposes that substances are not randomly chosen, but are specifically selected for their effects. For example, using stimulants such as nicotine or amphetamines can be used to combat the sedation that can be caused by higher doses of certain types of antipsychotic medication. Conversely, some people taking medications with a stimulant effect such as the SNRI antidepressants Effexor (venlafaxine) or Wellbutrin (bupropion) may seek out benzodiazepines or opioid narcotics to counter the anxiety and insomnia that such medications sometimes evoke.

Some studies show that nicotine administration can be effective for reducing motor side-effects of antipsychotics, with both bradykinesia (stiff muscles) and dyskinesia (involuntary movement) being prevented.

=== Alleviation of dysphoria theory ===
The alleviation of dysphoria theory suggests that people with severe mental illness commonly have a negative self-image, which makes them vulnerable to using psychoactive substances to alleviate these feelings. Despite the existence of a wide range of dysphoric feelings (anxiety, depression, boredom, and loneliness), the literature on self-reported reasons for use seems to lend support for the experience of these feelings being the primary motivator for alcohol use disorder and other drug misuse.

=== Multiple risk factor theory ===
Another theory is that there may be shared risk factors that can lead to both substance use and mental illness. Mueser hypothesizes that these may include factors such as social isolation, poverty, lack of structured daily activity, lack of adult role responsibility, living in areas with high drug availability, and association with people who already misuse drugs.

Other evidence suggests that traumatic life events, such as sexual abuse, are associated with the development of psychiatric problems and substance use.

=== The supersensitivity theory ===
The supersensitivity theory proposes that certain individuals who have severe mental illness also have biological and psychological vulnerabilities, caused by genetic and early environmental life events. These interact with stressful life events and can result in either a psychiatric disorder or trigger a relapse into an existing illness. The theory states that although anti-psychotic medication can reduce the vulnerability, substance use may increase it, causing the individual to be more likely to experience negative consequences from using relatively small amounts of substances. These individuals, therefore, are "supersensitive" to the effects of certain substances, and individuals with psychotic illness such as schizophrenia may be less capable of sustaining moderate substance use over time without experiencing negative symptoms.

Although there are limitations in the research studies conducted in this area, namely that most have focused primarily on schizophrenia, this theory provides an explanation of why relatively low levels of substance misuse often result in negative consequences for individuals with severe mental illness.

== Avoiding categorical diagnosis ==
Current nosological approach does not provide a framework for internal (sub-threshold symptoms) or external (comorbidity) heterogeneity of the different diagnostic categories. The prevailing "Neo-Kraepelinian" diagnostic system solely accounts for a categorical diagnosis, therefore not allowing for the possibility of dual diagnosis. There has been substantial criticism to the Diagnostic and Statistical Manual of Mental Disorders (DSM-IV), due to problems of diagnostic overlap, lack of clear boundaries between normality and disease, a failure to take into account findings from novel research and the lack of diagnostic stability over time.

== History ==
The traditional method for treating patients with dual diagnosis was a parallel treatment program. In this format, patients received mental health services from one clinician while addressing their substance use with a separate clinician. However, researchers found that parallel treatments were ineffective, suggesting a need to integrate the services addressing mental health with those addressing substance use.

During the mid-1980s, a number of initiatives began to combine mental health and substance use disorder services in an attempt to meet this need. These programs worked to shift the method of treatment for substance use from a confrontational approach to a supportive one. They also introduced new methods to motivate clients and worked with them to develop long-term goals for their care. Although the studies conducted by these initiatives did not have control groups, their results were promising and became the basis for more rigorous efforts to study and develop models of integrated treatment.

The COVID-19 pandemic has been associated with increased rates of substance use and psychological distress, potentially increasing co-occurring disorders in vulnerable populations.
