= Lormetazepam =

Benzodiazepine medication

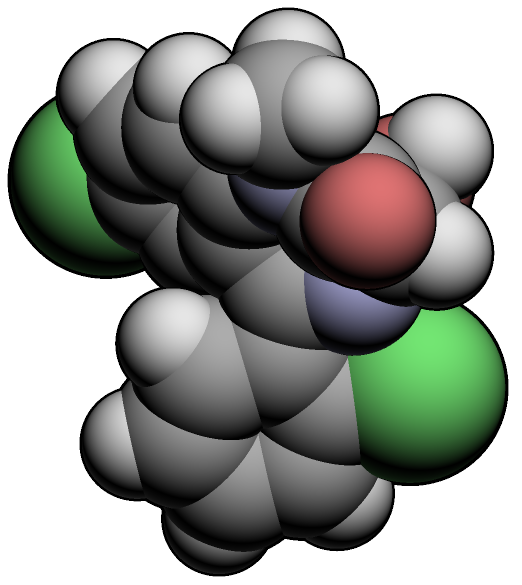

Clinical data
- Trade names: Noctamid, Loramet, others
- Other names: Methyllorazepam; Methyl-lorazepam; N-Methyllorazepam; Ro 5-5516
- AHFS/Drugs.com: International Drug Names
- Pregnancy category: D
- Routes of administration: Oral, intravenous
- Drug class: Benzodiazepine
- ATC code: N05CD06 (WHO)

Legal status
- Legal status: BR: Class B1 (Psychoactive drugs); CA: Schedule IV; DE: Prescription only (Anlage III for higher doses); US: Schedule IV

Pharmacokinetic data
- Bioavailability: 80%
- Metabolism: Hepatic
- Elimination half-life: 10–12 hours
- Excretion: Renal

Identifiers
- IUPAC name: (RS)-7-Chloro-5-(2-chlorophenyl)-3-hydroxy-1-methyl-1H-benzo[e][1,4]diazepin-2(3H)-one
- CAS Number: 848-75-9
- PubChem CID: 13314
- IUPHAR/BPS: 7553
- DrugBank: DB13872
- ChemSpider: 12750
- UNII: GU56C842ZA
- KEGG: D01657
- ChEBI: CHEBI:52993
- ChEMBL: ChEMBL22097
- CompTox Dashboard (EPA): DTXSID40862442
- ECHA InfoCard: 100.011.546

Chemical and physical data
- Formula: C_{16}H_{12}Cl_{2}N_{2}O_{2}
- Molar mass: 335.18 g·mol^{−1}
- 3D model (JSmol): Interactive image
- SMILES: ClC1=CC=CC=C1C2=NC(C(N(C)C3=C2C=C(C=C3)Cl)=O)O
- InChI: InChI=1S/C16H12Cl2N2O2/c1-20-13-7-6-9(17)8-11(13)14(19-15(21)16(20)22)10-4-2-3-5-12(10)18/h2-8,15,21H,1H3; Key:FJIKWRGCXUCUIG-UHFFFAOYSA-N

Lormetazepam, sold under the brand name Noctamid among others, is a drug which is a short to intermediate acting 3-hydroxy benzodiazepine derivative and temazepam analogue. It possesses hypnotic, anxiolytic, anticonvulsant, sedative, and skeletal muscle relaxant properties.

It was patented in 1961 and came into medical use in 1980. Lormetazepam is not approved for sale in the United States or Canada. It is licensed in the UK as 0.5 and 1 mg tablets for short-term treatment (2–4 weeks) of moderately severe insomnia. It is licensed in the Netherlands as 1 and 2 mg tablets, under the brand names Loramet and Noctamid and as generic, available from several manufacturers. It is sold in Poland as Noctofer. It is also sold in France as generic as 1 and 2mg tablets, with a maximum prescription duration of 4 weeks. A Dutch analysis stated that lormetazepam could be suitable to be included in drug prescribing formularies, although zolpidem, zopiclone, and temazepam appear better.

== Medical uses ==
Lormetazepam is considered a hypnotic benzodiazepine and is officially indicated for moderate-to-severe insomnia. Lormetazepam is a short-acting benzodiazepine and is sometimes used in patients who have difficulty in maintaining sleep or falling asleep. Hypnotics should only be used on a short-term basis or, in those with chronic insomnia, on an occasional basis.

== Side effects ==
Side effects of lormetazepam are similar to those of other hypnotic benzodiazepines and can for the most part be regarded as a class effect. In a sleep study, 1 mg lormetazepam increased total sleep time, reduced wakefulness, but did not alter REM sleep. However, at 2 mg doses, there were significant increases in stage 3 sleep and reductions in REM sleep. Rebound effects have been reported after chronic use including rebound REM. In one clinical trial with patients who had prior experience with older hypnotics temazepam and nitrazepam, most preferred lormetazepam due to less heavy sedation, amnesia, and residual effects. Some side effects, including drowsiness, amnesia, and respiratory depression, are increased when lormetazepam is combined with other drugs with similar effects, e.g. alcohol and nonbenzodiazepine drugs.

Although lormetazepam has been associated with adversely affecting immediate and delayed recall memory functions, studies have shown that lormetazepam's amnesic properties may be lesser compared to other hypnotic benzodiazepines. For example, in a 1984 study comparing the amnesic effects of lormetazepam to temazepam and flurazepam showed that amnesia was smallest after lormetazepam and greatest after temazepam, which had produced greater amnesia than both lormetazepam and flurazepam by a significant margin.

Side effects of lormetazepam include:

- Somnolence
- Paradoxical increase in aggression
- Lightheadedness
- Confusion
- Muscle weakness
- Ataxia (particularly in the elderly)
- Anterograde amnesia
- Headache
- Vertigo
- Hypotension
- Salivation changes
- Gastrointestinal disturbances
- Visual disturbances
- Dysarthria
- Tremor
- Changes in libido
- Urinary incontinence
- Urinary retention
- Blood disorders and jaundice
- Skin reactions
- Dependence and withdrawal reactions

Residual "hangover" effects after nighttime administration of lormetazepam such as sleepiness, impaired psychomotor and cognitive functions may persist into the next day which may impair the ability of users to drive safely and increase risks of falls and hip fractures.

Benzodiazepines require special precaution if used during pregnancy, in children, in alcohol- or drug-dependent individuals and individuals with comorbid psychiatric disorders. Lormetazepam may be unsuitable for the elderly due to residual effects on memory and body sway which may result in falls. Lormetazepam causes impaired driving skills, thus caution is required in individuals who drive or operate machinery.

=== Tolerance, dependence, and withdrawal ===
The risks of tolerance, dependence, and withdrawal are very low when the drug is used for 2–4 weeks only, and lormetazepam is generally a safe and effective drug when used for no longer than 2–4 weeks. Some sleep disturbance in the form of rebound insomnia can, however, occur even after short-term usage of 7 days. Those with a history of addiction may be at increased risk of problems of tolerance and dependence especially those with a past history of dependency on sedative hypnotic drugs.

Lormetazepam as with other benzodiazepines is generally only recommended for short-term use (2–4 weeks) due to tolerance and loss of efficacy. Tolerance to and loss of the sedative effects of benzodiazepine hypnotics can occur within 14 days of regular use. Some studies however suggest such treatments retain their effectiveness in the long term - such a lack of consistency in the findings of many studies could be due to the variation of responses to benzodiazepine treatment.

Dependence is the medical term for addiction. Dependence can either be psychological and/or physical. Psychological dependence can manifest itself as a reliance on a drug to cope with everyday life or in the form of craving. Physical dependence occurs due to physiological adaptations occurring as the body attempts to overcome the drugs effects which is known as tolerance and the continuing need to take the drug to avoid or suppress withdrawal symptoms which can sometimes resemble the original condition being treated. When the dose or the drug is discontinued withdrawal symptoms typically occur. Lormetazepam as with all other benzodiazepines produces both physical and psychological dependence but the main problem of concern is physical dependence which appears in the form of the benzodiazepine withdrawal syndrome after the dosage is reduced or the drug is stopped completely. The dependence induced by lormetazepam is related to changes in the sensitivity of the GABA-BZD receptor complex.

Withdrawal symptoms typically subside after 4–8 weeks but in approximately 10-15% of individuals symptoms can persist for many months and in rare cases years. Some "Withdrawal Symptoms" can emerge despite a constant dosage with the body needing extra dosage in order to feel normal. This is sometimes associated with dosage escalation.

Lormetazepam has a short to intermediate half-life of approximately 10–12 hours. Shorter acting benzodiazepine compounds are generally associated with a more intense and immediate withdrawal reaction compared to longer acting benzodiazepines. For this reason it is generally recommended to cross from lormetazepam to an equivalent dose of diazepam to gradually taper the dosage.

== Pharmacology ==
The bioavailability of lormetazepam was found to be 80%.

Lormetazepam and other benzodiazepine drugs act as positive modulators at the GABA_{A} benzodiazepine receptor complex. Lormetazepam binds to the benzodiazepine receptor which in turn enhances the effect of the GABA_{A} receptor producing its therapeutic effects as well as adverse effects. When lormetazepam binds to the benzodiazepine receptor sites in sufficient quantities it produces sedation which is used clinically as a therapeutic treatment for insomnia. Lormetazepam alters the brain electrical activity which has been studied via EEG readings. Lormetazepam appears to be more selective in the type of benzodiazepine receptor it binds to showing a higher affinity for the omega 1 receptor which is responsible for sedation. Changes in EEG can therefore be used to measure the sedative sleep promoting properties of lormetazepam.

== Chemistry ==
=== Stereochemistry ===
Lormetazepam has a stereocenter and two enantiomers. Medications are racemates.

Enantiomers of lormetazepam
(R)-lormetazepam; CAS number: 113679-56-4	(S)-lormetazepam; CAS number: 113679-54-2

== Industry ==
=== Brand names ===
Trade names include Aldosomnil, Dilamet, Ergocalm, Loramet, Loretam, Metatop, Minias, Noctamid, Noctamide, Noctofer, Nocton, Pronoctan, Sedaben, Sedalam, and Stilaze.
