= Antidepressant discontinuation syndrome =

Symptoms that occur after discontinuing antidepressant medication

- Other names: Antidepressant withdrawal syndrome
- Specialty: Psychiatry
- Symptoms: Flu-like symptoms, trouble sleeping, anxiety, depression, dissociation, intrusive thoughts, nausea, poor balance, dizziness, sensory changes
- Usual onset: Within 3 days
- Duration: Few weeks to months
- Causes: Stopping of an antidepressant medication
- Diagnostic method: Based on symptoms
- Differential diagnosis: Anxiety, mania, stroke
- Prevention: Gradual dose reduction
- Frequency: 15–50% (with sudden stopping)

Antidepressant discontinuation syndrome, or antidepressant withdrawal, is a condition that can occur following switching, reducing, or discontinuing an antidepressant medication following its continuous use of at least a month. The symptoms may include dizziness, vertigo, postural orthostatic tachycardia syndrome (POTS), tinnitus, insomnia, nausea, poor balance, sensory changes, "brain zaps", emotional lability or extreme emotional changes, rage, suicidal ideation, akathisia, dysesthesia, intrusive thoughts, depersonalization and derealization, mania, anxiety, depression, stuttering, and flu-like symptoms. Psychosis may rarely occur. Depending on the specific antidepressant's half-life, withdrawal can begin within a few days or weeks, but late onset or delayed onset withdrawal can occur months after cessation. If stopped too quickly, a withdrawal injury can occur. This is referred to as protracted withdrawal and may last for several months or years.

Discontinuation syndrome was coined by Eli Lilly as a way to distance antidepressants from other dependence-forming psychotropics with higher addiction risk profiles. However, the evidence supports that what has been labeled as "discontinuation syndrome" is a classical withdrawal syndrome. Antidepressants are not addictive and do not produce substance use disorders, but they do create physical dependence which occurs when the body makes neuroadaptations due to the presence of the drug.

Withdrawal can occur after stopping nearly every class of antidepressants including selective serotonin reuptake inhibitors (SSRIs), serotonin–norepinephrine reuptake inhibitors (SNRIs), monoamine oxidase inhibitors (MAOIs), and tricyclic antidepressants (TCAs). The risk is greater among those who have taken the medication for longer and when the medication in question has a short half-life. The diagnosis is based on the symptoms and timeline of drug cessation.

Methods of prevention include gradually decreasing the dose among those who wish to stop, though it is possible for symptoms to occur with tapering. Treatment may include restarting the medication and slowly decreasing the dose. People may also be switched to the long-acting antidepressant fluoxetine which can then be gradually decreased.

Approximately 15–50% of people who suddenly stop an antidepressant develop antidepressant discontinuation syndrome. About half of people with discontinuation symptoms describe them as severe, and the discontinuation period is associated with a 60% increase in suicide attempts compared to people who had previously used antidepressants but were outside the discontinuation period. Many restart antidepressants due to the severity of the symptoms.

Antidepressant discontinuation syndrome is a relatively new phenomenon, being identified and described from 1950s onwards, in parallel with discovery and introduction of modern antidepressant medications, with the first MAOIs, and TCAs introduced from the 1950s onwards and the first SSRIs from the 1980s onward. There is still little research on this syndrome; most of the research is conflicting or consists only of clinical trials.

== Signs and symptoms ==
People with antidepressant discontinuation syndrome have been on an antidepressant for at least four weeks and have recently stopped taking the medication, whether abruptly, after a fast taper, or each time the medication is reduced on a slow taper. Commonly reported symptoms include flu-like symptoms (e.g., nausea, vomiting, diarrhea, headaches, sweating) and sleep disturbances (e.g., insomnia, nightmares, constant sleepiness). Sensory and movement disturbances have also been reported, including imbalance, tremors, vertigo, dizziness, and electric-shock-like experiences in the brain, often described by people who have them as brain zaps. These "brain zaps" have been described as an electric shock felt in the skull, potentially triggered by lateral eye movement, and at times accompanied by vertigo, pain, or dissociative symptoms. Some individuals consider it as a pleasant experience akin to an orgasm, however it is more often reported as an unpleasant experience that interferes with daily function. Mood disturbances such as dysphoria, anxiety, or agitation are also reported, as are cognitive disturbances such as confusion and hyperarousal. In cases associated with sudden discontinuation of MAO inhibitors (MAOIs), acute psychosis has been observed. Over fifty symptoms have been reported. The SNRI venlafaxine has been reported to have a higher incidence in withdrawal symptoms after discontinuation when compared to other SNRIs. Venlafaxine has also been implicated to create withdrawal symptoms regardless of dosage. Venlafaxine has been implicated in causing the most severe withdrawal symptoms after cessation of use, possibly due to its short half-life.

To simplify identifying the principal signs and symptoms, the mnemonic FINISH may be used:

- Flu-like symptoms
- Insomnia
- Nausea
- Imbalance
- Sensory disturbances, including "brain zaps"
- Hyperarousal

A 2009 Advisory Committee to the U.S. Food and Drug Administration found that online anecdotal reports of discontinuation syndrome related to duloxetine included severe symptoms and exceeded prevalence of both paroxetine and venlafaxine reports by over 250% (although acknowledged this may have been influenced by duloxetine being a much newer drug). It also found that the safety information provided by the manufacturer not only neglected important information about managing discontinuation syndrome, but also explicitly advised against opening capsules, a practice required to gradually taper dosage.

=== Duration ===
Most cases of discontinuation syndrome may last between one and four weeks and resolve on their own. Occasionally symptoms can last up to one year. They typically resolve within a day of restoring the medication. Paroxetine and venlafaxine seem to be particularly difficult to discontinue, and prolonged withdrawal syndrome (post-acute-withdrawal syndrome, or PAWS) lasting over 18 months has been reported with paroxetine.

== Mechanism ==
The underlying reason for its occurrence is unclear, though the syndrome appears similar to withdrawal from other psychotropic drugs such as benzodiazepines. For SSRIs, a tapered discontinuation results in less severe symptoms. There is also evidence that antidepressant discontinuation syndrome may be related to the biological half-life of both SSRIs and antidepressants in general. Antidepressants with a lower half-life, such as paroxetine, duloxetine, and venlafaxine, have been implicated in higher incidences of withdrawal symptoms and more severe withdrawal symptoms. The opposite association has been observed in antidepressants with relatively longer half lives, such as fluoxetine. With SSRIs, duration of treatment does not appear associated with the severity of withdrawal symptoms.

One hypothesis is that after the antidepressant is discontinued, there is a temporary (but in some cases long-lasting) deficiency in the brain of one or more essential neurotransmitters that regulate mood, such as serotonin, dopamine, norepinephrine, and GABA (gamma-aminobutyric acid), and since neurotransmitters are an interrelated system, dysregulation of one affects the others. There may be a link between lower 5-hydroxytryptamine (5-HT, i.e. serotonin) receptor availability and symptoms of antidepressant discontinuation syndrome.

Among antidepressants analyzed by Gastaldon et al. (2022), lofepramine, vortioxetine, mianserin, agomelatine, and esketamine are not associated with significantly disproportionate reporting of withdrawal syndrome. The authors could not rule out the possibility of notoriety bias and/or low sample size in causing this result.

=== Research ===
Animal models are able to recapitulate some aspects of antidepressant withdrawal. For example, discontinuation of paroxetine in mice leads to anxiety-like behavior, together with a rebound over-activation of 5-HT neurons. One problem is that many animal studies use fluoxetine as the study drug, despite it being not very commonly associated with withdrawal in human patients. A lack of understanding over how antidepressants work also complicates the picture. More studies using more relevant drugs, along with measuring more relevant aspects of the nervous system, will be needed to understand the mechanism of withdrawal in rodents.

== Prevention and treatment ==
In some cases, withdrawal symptoms may be prevented by taking medication as directed, and when discontinuing, doing so gradually, although symptoms may appear while tapering. When discontinuing an antidepressant with a short half-life, switching to a drug with a longer half-life (e.g., fluoxetine or citalopram) and then tapering, and eventually discontinuing, from that drug can decrease the severity of symptoms in some cases. Gradual tapering over weeks to months is commonly recommended to reduce withdrawal symptoms, although direct comparative evidence on optimal taper duration is limited. A NICE committee noted that variability in withdrawal symptoms and tapering response among patients prevented the recommendation of a specific tapering timeline, and that an individualized approach to tapering is warranted.

Treatment is dependent on the severity of the discontinuation reaction and whether or not further antidepressant treatment is warranted. In cases where further antidepressant treatment is prescribed, then the only option suggested may be restarting the antidepressant. If antidepressants are no longer required, treatment depends on symptom severity. If symptoms of discontinuation are severe, or do not respond to symptom management, the antidepressant can be reinstated and then withdrawn more cautiously, or by switching to a drug with a longer half-life (e.g., fluoxetine), and then tapering and discontinuing that drug. In severe cases, hospitalization may be required.

=== Pregnancy and newborns ===
Antidepressants, including SSRIs, can cross the placenta and have the potential to affect the fetus and newborn, including an increased chance of miscarriage, presenting a dilemma for pregnant women to decide whether to continue to take antidepressants at all, or if they do, considering if tapering and discontinuing during pregnancy could have a protective effect for the newborn.

Neonatal withdrawal syndrome was first noticed in 1973 in newborns of mothers taking antidepressants; symptoms in the infant include irritability, rapid breathing, hypothermia, and blood sugar problems. The symptoms usually develop from birth to days after delivery and usually resolve within days or weeks of delivery.

== Culture and history ==
Antidepressant discontinuation symptoms were first reported with imipramine, the first tricyclic antidepressant (TCA), in the late 1950s, and each new class of antidepressants has brought reports of similar conditions, including monoamine oxidase inhibitors (MAOIs), SSRIs, and SNRIs. As of 2001, at least 21 different antidepressants, covering all the major classes, were known to cause discontinuation syndromes. The problem has been poorly studied, and most of the literature has been case reports or small clinical studies; incidence is hard to determine and controversial.

With the explosion of use and interest in SSRIs in the late 1980s and early 1990s, focused especially on Prozac, interest grew as well in discontinuation syndromes. Some of the symptoms emerged from discussion boards where people with depression discussed their experiences with the disease and their medications; "brain zaps" or "brain shivers" was one symptom that emerged via these websites.

Heightened media attention and continuing public concerns led to the formation of an expert group on the safety of SSRIs in England to evaluate all the research available prior to 2004. The group determined that the incidence of discontinuation symptoms are between 5% and 49%, depending on the particular SSRI, the length of time on the medicine and abrupt versus gradual cessation.

With the lack of a definition based on consensus criteria for the syndrome, a panel met in Phoenix, Arizona, in 1997 to form a draft definition, which other groups continued to refine.

In the late 1990s, some investigators thought that the fact that symptoms emerged when antidepressants were discontinued might mean that antidepressants were causing addiction, and some used the term "withdrawal syndrome" to describe the symptoms. While people taking antidepressants do not commonly exhibit drug-seeking behavior, stopping antidepressants leads to similar symptoms as found in drug withdrawal from benzodiazepines, and other psychotropic drugs. As such, some researchers advocate the term withdrawal over discontinuation, to communicate the similar physiological dependence and negative outcomes. Due to pressure from pharmaceutical companies who make antidepressants, the term "withdrawal syndrome" is no longer used by drug makers, and thus, most doctors, due to concerns that they may be compared to other drugs more commonly associated with withdrawal.

=== 2013 class action lawsuit ===
In 2013, a proposed class action lawsuit, Jennifer L Saavedra v. Eli Lilly and Company, was brought against Eli Lilly claiming that the Cymbalta label omitted important information about "brain zaps" and other symptoms upon cessation. Eli Lilly moved for dismissal per the "learned intermediary doctrine" as the doctors prescribing the drug were warned of the potential problems and are an intermediary medical judgment between Lilly and patients; in December 2013, Lilly's motion to dismiss was denied. In December 2014, class certification was denied. A second attempt at certification in 2015 also failed.

== See also ==
- Benzodiazepine withdrawal syndrome
- Tapering (medicine)
