= Heather Ashton =

British psychopharmacologist and physician (1929–2019)

- Born: Chrystal Heather Champion; 11 July 1929; Dehradun, British India
- Died: 15 September 2019 (aged 90); Newcastle upon Tyne, England
- Education: Somerville College, Oxford
- Scientific career
- Fields: Medicine, Psychopharmacology
- Workplaces: Newcastle University

Heather Ashton FRCP (11 July 1929 – 15 September 2019) was a British psychopharmacologist and physician. She is best known for her clinical and research work on benzodiazepine dependence.

== Biography ==
Chrystal Heather Champion was born in Dehradun, northern India, to Harry Champion, a British silviculturist, and Chrystal (Parsons) Champion, a secretary. From the age of six, she attended a boarding school in Swanage, Dorset, England. When WWII began, she was evacuated to West Chester, Pennsylvania; during the crossing, her ship was attacked by a U-boat.

Ashton went on to study Medicine at Somerville College, Oxford, graduating with a first class honours Bachelor of Arts (BA) degree in physiology in 1951. She earned her Bachelor of Medicine, Bachelor of Surgery (BM BCh) degrees in 1954 and a postgraduate Doctor of Medicine (DM) degree in 1956. She completed professional training at Middlesex Hospital. She was elected as a Fellow of the Royal College of Physicians, London, in 1975.

In 1965, Ashton joined the faculty at Newcastle University, first in the Department of Pharmacology and later in the Department of Psychiatry. From 1982 to 1994, she ran a benzodiazepine withdrawal clinic at the Royal Victoria Infirmary in Newcastle. She was on the executive committee of the North East Council on Addictions. Ashton also helped set up the British organisation Victims of Tranquillisers (VOT). She also gave evidence to British government committees on tobacco smoking, cannabis and benzodiazepines.

Ashton died on 15 September 2019 at her home in Newcastle upon Tyne, at age 90.

== Research ==
Ashton's developed her expertise in the effects of psychoactive drugs and the effects of substances such as nicotine and cannabis on the brain.

During the 1960s, benzodiazepines, like diazepam and temazepam, had become popular and were seen as safe and effective treatments for anxiety or insomnia. Ashton found patients who had been on the medications for extended periods came to her with concerns about addiction and further health problems.

Ashton's research on these drugs found that they could be used in the short term, but could lead to physical dependence over the long-term. She developed an approach to withdrawal that supported the patient to control the rate at which the dose was tapered, often taking months or even longer. This led to her writing an important manual to help those who were trying to stop their prescribed benzodiazepine. This manual is now used all over the world. This book, Benzodiazepines: How They Work and How to Withdraw, was first published in 1999; it has become known as the Ashton Manual and has been translated into 11 languages.

Ashton's research was influential, leading to changes in prescribing practices and guidelines in Britain and the USA. Her research on psychotropic drugs led to over 200 journal articles, chapters and books, including over 50 papers concerning benzodiazepines alone.
