= Benzodiazepine withdrawal syndrome =

Medical condition

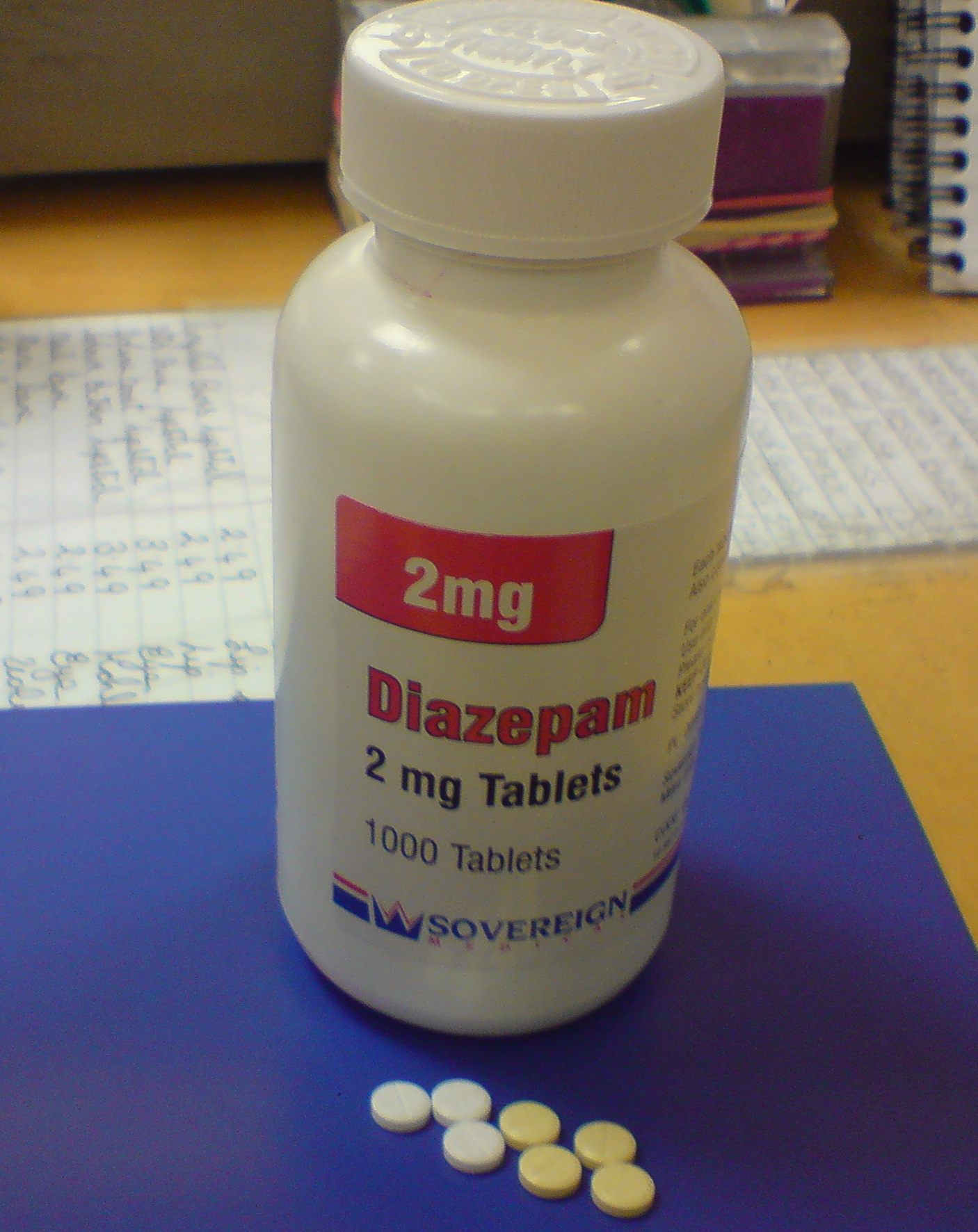
- Diazepam is sometimes used in the treatment of benzodiazepine withdrawal.
- Specialty: Toxicology, Addiction medicine, Psychiatry
- Symptoms: Anxiety, irritability, panic attacks, paranoia, tremor, akathisia, dissociation, confusion, insomnia, sensory disturbances, seizures
- Complications: Seizures, suicide, hyperthermia, psychosis, delirium, catatonia, psychological trauma, death
- Duration: Average: ~2 months
- Causes: Stopping or reducing intake of benzodiazepines in a state of dependence
- Prevention: Gradual dose reduction

Benzodiazepine withdrawal syndrome (BZD withdrawal) is the cluster of signs and symptoms that may emerge when a person who has been taking benzodiazepines develops a physical dependence on them and then reduces the dose or stops taking them without a safe taper schedule.

Typically, benzodiazepine withdrawal is characterized by sleep disturbance, irritability, increased tension and anxiety, depression, panic attacks, hand tremor, shaking, sweating, difficulty with concentration, confusion and cognitive difficulty, memory problems, dry mouth, nausea and vomiting, diarrhea, loss of appetite and weight loss, burning sensations and pain in the upper spine, palpitations, headache, nightmares, tinnitus, muscular pain and stiffness, depersonalization, restless legs syndrome, seizures, suicidal ideation, and a host of perceptual changes.

Benzodiazepine withdrawal can also lead to disturbances in mental function that persist for several months or years after onset of symptoms (referred to as post-acute-withdrawal syndrome in this form).

Withdrawal symptoms can be managed by educating patients about the nature and expected course of benzodiazepine withdrawal, individualized taper strategies according to withdrawal severity, the addition of alternative strategies such as reassurance, and referral to benzodiazepine withdrawal support groups.

== Signs and symptoms ==
Withdrawal symptoms occur during dose reduction and may include insomnia, anxiety, distress, weight loss, dizziness, night sweats, shaking, muscle twitches, aphasia, panic attacks, depression, numbness, dissociation, paranoia, indigestion, diarrhea, and photophobia. As withdrawal progresses, patients often find their physical and mental health improves with improved mood and improved cognition.

A more complete list of possible symptoms stated in publications:

- Akathisia (restlessness)
- Agitation and anxiety
- Panic attacks
- Blurred vision
- Chest pain
- Depersonalization and derealization (feelings of unreality)
- Depression (can be severe), possible suicidal ideation
- Dilated pupils
- Dizziness
- Dry mouth
- Dysphoria
- High blood pressure
- Fatigue and weakness
- Gastrointestinal disturbance (e.g., nausea, diarrhea, vomiting)
- Hearing disturbance
- Headache
- Hot and cold spells
- Hyperosmia
- Hyperacusis
- Hypnagogic hallucinations
- Hypochondriasis
- Increased sensitivity to touch
- Increased urinary frequency
- Insomnia
- Impaired memory and concentration
- Loss of appetite and weight loss
- Mild to moderate aphasia
- Mood swings
- Muscular spasms, cramps, or fasciculations
- Nightmares
- Obsessive–compulsive symptoms
- Paraesthesia
- Paranoia
- Perspiration
- Photophobia
- Postural hypotension
- REM sleep rebound
- Restless legs syndrome
- Stiffness
- Taste and smell disturbances
- Tachycardia
- Tinnitus
- Tremor
- Visual disturbances

Rapid discontinuation may result in a more serious syndrome

- Catatonia
- Confusion
- Seizures, which may result in death
- Coma (rare)
- Delirium tremens
- Hyperthermia
- Mania
- Neuroleptic malignant syndrome-like event (rare)
- Organic brain syndrome
- Post-traumatic stress disorder
- Psychosis
- Suicidal ideation or suicide
- Violence and aggression

== Mechanism ==
The neuroadaptive processes involved in tolerance, dependence, and withdrawal mechanisms implicate both the GABAergic and the glutamatergic systems. Gamma-Aminobutyric acid (GABA) is the major inhibitory neurotransmitter of the central nervous system; roughly one-quarter to one-third of synapses use GABA. GABA mediates the influx of chloride ions through ligand-gated chloride channels called GABA_{A} receptors. When chloride enters the nerve cell, the cell membrane potential hyperpolarizes thereby inhibiting depolarization, or reduction in the firing rate of the post-synaptic nerve cell. Benzodiazepines potentiate the action of GABA, by binding a site between the α and γ subunits of the 5-subunit receptor thereby increasing the frequency of the GABA-gated chloride channel opening in the presence of GABA.

When potentiation is sustained by long-term use, neuroadaptations occur which result in decreased GABAergic response. What is certain is that surface GABA_{A} receptor protein levels are altered in response to benzodiazepine exposure, as is receptor turnover rate. The exact reason for the reduced responsiveness has not been elucidated but down-regulation of the number of receptors has only been observed at some receptor locations including in the pars reticulata of the substantia nigra; down-regulation of the number of receptors or internalization does not appear to be the main mechanism at other locations. Evidence exists for other hypotheses including changes in the receptor conformation, changes in turnover, recycling, or production rates, degree of phosphorylation and receptor gene expression, subunit composition, decreased coupling mechanisms between the GABA and benzodiazepine site, decrease in GABA production, and compensatory increased glutamatergic activity. A unified model hypothesis involves a combination of internalization of the receptor, followed by preferential degradation of certain receptor sub-units, which provides the nuclear activation for changes in receptor gene transcription.

It has been postulated that when benzodiazepines are cleared from the brain, these neuroadaptations are "unmasked", leading to unopposed excitability of the neuron. Glutamate is the most abundant excitatory neurotransmitter in the vertebrate nervous system. Increased glutamate excitatory activity during withdrawal may lead to sensitization or kindling of the CNS, possibly leading to worsening cognition and symptomatology and making each subsequent withdrawal period worse. Those who have a prior history of withdrawing from benzodiazepines are found to be less likely to succeed the next time around.

== Diagnosis ==
In severe cases, the withdrawal reaction or protracted withdrawal may exacerbate or resemble serious psychiatric and medical conditions, such as mania, schizophrenia, agitated depression, panic disorder, generalised anxiety disorder, and complex partial seizures and, especially at high doses, seizure disorders. Failure to recognize discontinuation symptoms can lead to false evidence for the need to take benzodiazepines, which in turn leads to withdrawal failure and reinstatement of benzodiazepines, often to higher doses. Pre-existing disorder or other causes typically do not improve, whereas symptoms of protracted withdrawal gradually improve over the ensuing months.

Symptoms may lack a psychological cause and can fluctuate in intensity with periods of good and bad days until eventual recovery.

== Prevention ==
According to the British National Formulary, it is better to withdraw too slowly rather than too quickly from benzodiazepines. The rate of dosage reduction is best carried out so as to minimize the symptoms' intensity and severity. Anecdotally, a slow rate of reduction may reduce the risk of developing a severe protracted syndrome.

Long half-life benzodiazepines like diazepam or chlordiazepoxide are preferred to minimize rebound effects and are available in low dose forms. Some people may not fully stabilize between dose reductions, even when the rate of reduction is slowed. Such people sometimes simply need to persist as they may not feel better until they have been fully withdrawn from them for a period of time.

== Management ==
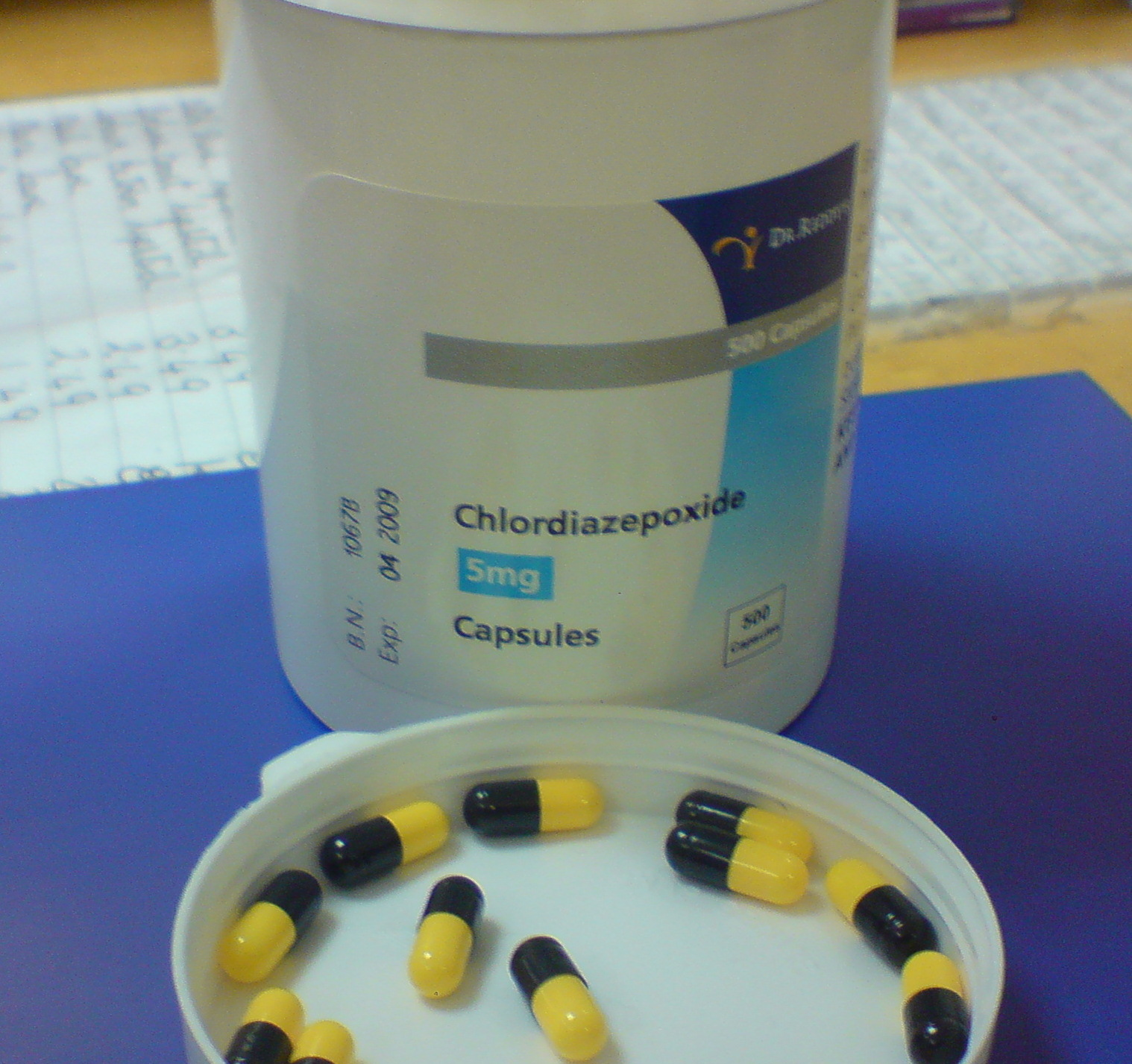
Chlordiazepoxide, 5 mg capsules, are sometimes used as an alternative to diazepam for benzodiazepine withdrawal. Like diazepam, it has a long elimination half-life and long-acting active metabolites.

Management of benzodiazepine dependence involves considering the person's age, comorbidity and the pharmacological pathways of benzodiazepines. Psychological interventions may provide a small but significant additional benefit over gradual dose reduction alone at post-cessation and at follow-up. The psychological interventions studied were relaxation training, cognitive-behavioral treatment of insomnia, and self-monitoring of consumption and symptoms, goal-setting, management of withdrawal and coping with anxiety.

There is no standard approach to managing benzodiazepine withdrawal. With sufficient motivation and the proper approach, almost anyone can successfully withdraw from benzodiazepines. However, a prolonged and severe withdrawal syndrome can cause profound disability, which may lead to breakdown of relationships, loss of employment, financial difficulties, as well as more serious adverse effects such as hospitalization and suicide. As such, long-term users should not be forced to discontinue against their will.

Over-rapid withdrawal, lack of explanation, and failure to reassure individuals that they are experiencing temporary withdrawal symptoms led some people to experience increased panic and fears they are going mad, with some people developing a condition similar to post-traumatic stress disorder as a result. A slow withdrawal regimen, coupled with reassurance from family, friends, and peers improves the outcome. According to a 2015 Cochrane review, cognitive behavior therapy plus taper was effective in achieving discontinuation in the short-term but the effect was not certain after six months.

=== Medications ===
While some substitutive pharmacotherapies may have promise, current evidence is insufficient to support their use. Some studies found that the abrupt substitution of substitutive pharmacotherapy was actually less effective than gradual dose reduction alone, and only three studies found benefits of adding melatonin, paroxetine, trazodone, or valproate in conjunction with a gradual dose reduction.

- Antipsychotics are generally ineffective for benzodiazepine withdrawal-related psychosis. Antipsychotics should be avoided during benzodiazepine withdrawal as they tend to aggravate withdrawal symptoms, including convulsions. Some antipsychotic agents may be riskier than others during withdrawal, especially clozapine, olanzapine or low potency phenothiazines (e.g., chlorpromazine), as they lower the seizure threshold and can worsen withdrawal effects; if used, extreme caution is required.
- Barbiturates are cross tolerant to benzodiazepines and should generally be avoided; however phenobarbital can be used, as it is relatively safe, see below.
- Benzodiazepines or cross tolerant drugs should be avoided after discontinuation, even occasionally. These include the nonbenzodiazepines Z-drugs, which have a similar mechanism of action. This is because tolerance to benzodiazepines has been demonstrated to be still present at four months to two years after withdrawal depending on personal biochemistry. Re-exposures to benzodiazepines typically resulted in a reactivation of the tolerance and benzodiazepine withdrawal syndrome.
- Bupropion, which is used primarily as an antidepressant and smoking cessation aid, is contraindicated in people experiencing abrupt withdrawal from benzodiazepines or other sedative-hypnotics (e.g. alcohol), due to an increased risk of seizures.
- Buspirone augmentation was not found to increase the discontinuation success rate.
- Caffeine may worsen withdrawal symptoms because of its stimulatory properties. At least one animal study has shown some modulation of the benzodiazepine site by caffeine, which produces a lowering of seizure threshold.
- Carbamazepine, an anticonvulsant, appears to have some beneficial effects in the treatment and management of benzodiazepine withdrawal; however, research is limited and thus the ability of experts to make recommendations on its use for benzodiazepine withdrawal is not possible at present.
- Ethanol, the primary alcohol in alcoholic beverages, even mild to moderate use, has been found to be a significant predictor of withdrawal failure, probably because of its cross tolerance with benzodiazepines.
- Flumazenil has been found to stimulate the reversal of tolerance and the normalization of receptor function. However, further research is needed in the form of randomised trials to demonstrate its role in the treatment of benzodiazepine withdrawal. Flumazenil stimulates the up-regulation and reverses the uncoupling of benzodiazepine receptors to the GABA_{A} receptor, thereby reversing tolerance and reducing withdrawal symptoms and relapse rates. Because of limited research and experience compared to the possible risks involved, the flumazenil detoxification method is controversial and can only be done as an inpatient procedure under medical supervision.

Flumazenil was found to be more effective than placebo in reducing feelings of hostility and aggression in patients who had been free of benzodiazepines for 4–266 weeks. This may suggest a role for flumazenil in treating protracted benzodiazepine withdrawal symptoms.

A study into the effects of the benzodiazepine receptor antagonist, flumazenil, on benzodiazepine withdrawal symptoms persisting after withdrawal was carried out by Lader and Morton. Study subjects had been benzodiazepine-free for between one month and five years, but all reported persisting withdrawal effects to varying degrees. Persistent symptoms included clouded thinking, tiredness, muscular symptoms such as neck tension, depersonalisation, cramps and shaking and the characteristic perceptual symptoms of benzodiazepine withdrawal, namely, pins and needles feeling, burning skin, pain and subjective sensations of bodily distortion. Therapy with 0.2–2 mg of flumazenil intravenously was found to decrease these symptoms in a placebo-controlled study. This is of interest as benzodiazepine receptor antagonists are neutral and have no clinical effects. The author of the study suggested the most likely explanation is past benzodiazepine use and subsequent tolerance had locked the conformation of the GABA-BZD receptor complex into an inverse agonist conformation, and the antagonist flumazenil resets benzodiazepine receptors to their original sensitivity. Flumazenil was found in this study to be a successful treatment for protracted benzodiazepine withdrawal syndrome, but further research is required. A study by Professor Borg in Sweden produced similar results in patients in protracted withdrawal. In 2007, Hoffmann–La Roche the makers of flumazenil, acknowledged the existence of protracted benzodiazepine withdrawal syndromes, but did not recommended flumazenil to treat the condition.

- Fluoroquinolone antibiotics have been noted to increase the incidence of a CNS toxicity from 1% in the general population, to 4% in benzodiazepine-dependent population or in those undergoing withdrawal from them. This is probably the result of their GABA antagonistic effects as they have been found to competitively displace benzodiazepines from benzodiazepine receptor sites. This antagonism can precipitate acute withdrawal symptoms, that can persist for weeks or months before subsiding. The symptoms include depression, anxiety, psychosis, paranoia, severe insomnia, paresthesia, tinnitus, hypersensitivity to light (photophobia) and sound (hyperacusis), tremors, status epilepticus, suicidal thoughts and suicide attempt. Fluoroquinolone antibiotics should be contraindicated in patients who are dependent on or in benzodiazepine withdrawal. NSAIDs have some mild GABA antagonistic properties and animal research indicate that some may even displace benzodiazepines from their binding site. However, NSAIDs taken in combination with fluoroquinolones cause a very significant increase in GABA antagonism, GABA toxicity, seizures, and other severe adverse effects.
- Imidazenil has received some research for management of benzodiazepine withdrawal, but is not currently used in withdrawal.
- Imipramine was found to statistically increase the discontinuation success rate.
- Melatonin augmentation was found to statistically increase the discontinuation success rate for people with insomnia.
- Phenobarbital, a barbiturate, is used at "detox" or other inpatient facilities to prevent seizures during rapid withdrawal or cold turkey. The phenobarbital is followed by a one- to two-week taper, although a slow taper from phenobarbital is preferred. In a comparison study, a rapid taper using benzodiazepines was found to be superior to a phenobarbital rapid taper.
- Pregabalin may help reduce the severity of benzodiazepine withdrawal symptoms, and reduce the risk of relapse.
- Propranolol was not found to increase the discontinuation success rate.
- SSRI antidepressants have been found to have little value in the treatment of benzodiazepine withdrawal.
- Trazodone was not found to increase the discontinuation success rate.

=== Inpatient treatment ===
Inpatient drug detox or rehabilitation facilities may be inappropriate for those who have become tolerant or dependent while taking the drug as prescribed, as opposed to recreational use. Such inpatient referrals may be traumatic for these individuals.

== Prognosis ==
A 2006 meta-analysis found evidence for the efficacy of stepped care: minimal intervention (e.g. send an advisory letter, or meet a large number of patients to advise discontinuation), followed by systematic tapered discontinuation alone without augmentation if the first try was unsuccessful. Cognitive behavioral therapy improved discontinuation success rates for panic disorder, melatonin for insomnia, and flumazenil or sodium valproate for general long-term benzodiazepine use. A ten-year follow-up found that more than half of those who had successfully withdrawn from long-term use were still abstinent two years later and that if they were able to maintain this state at two years, they were likely to maintain this state at the ten-year follow-up. One study found that after one year of abstinence from long-term use of benzodiazepines, cognitive, neurological and intellectual impairments had returned to normal.

Those who had a prior psychiatric diagnosis had a similar success rate from a gradual taper at a two-year follow-up. Withdrawal from benzodiazepines did not lead to an increased use of antidepressants.

=== Withdrawal process ===
It can be too difficult to withdraw from short- or intermediate-acting benzodiazepines because of the intensity of the rebound symptoms felt between doses. Moreover, short-acting benzodiazepines appear to produce a more intense withdrawal syndrome. For this reason, discontinuation is sometimes carried out by first substituting an equivalent dose of a short-acting benzodiazepine with a longer-acting one like diazepam or chlordiazepoxide. Failure to use the correct equivalent amount can precipitate a severe withdrawal reaction. Benzodiazepines with a half-life of more than 24 hours include chlordiazepoxide, diazepam, clobazam, clonazepam, chlorazepinic acid, ketazolam, medazepam, nordazepam, and prazepam. Benzodiazepines with a half-life of less than 24 hours include alprazolam, bromazepam, brotizolam, flunitrazepam, loprazolam, lorazepam, lormetazepam, midazolam, nitrazepam, oxazepam, and temazepam. The resultant equivalent dose is then gradually reduced.

The consensus is to reduce dosage gradually over several weeks, e.g. 4 or more weeks for diazepam doses over 30 mg/day, with the rate determined by the person's ability to tolerate symptoms. The recommended reduction rates range from 50% of the initial dose every week or so, to 10–25% of the daily dose every 2 weeks. For example, the reduction rate used in the Heather Ashton protocol calls for eliminating 10% of the remaining dose every two to four weeks, depending on the severity and response to reductions with the final dose at 0.5 mg dose of diazepam or 2.5 mg dose of chlordiazepoxide. For most people, discontinuation over 4–6 weeks or 4–8 weeks is suitable. A prolonged period of reduction for longer than six months should be avoided to prevent the withdrawal process from becoming a "morbid focus" for the person.

The American Society of Addiction Medicine (ASAM), in collaboration with ten other American medical associations, issued a joint statement regarding benzodiazipine tapering in June 2025. Their recommendation is that, for most patients dependent on benzodiazipines and for whom the risks of continuing benzodiazipine use outweighs the benefits, the initial pace of the taper should generally include dose reductions of 5 to 10% every 2–4 weeks. The taper should not exceed 25% every 2 weeks. They emphasized that a taper that is too rapid can be dangerous and potentially life-threatening.

=== Duration ===
After the last dose has been taken, the acute phase of the withdrawal generally lasts for about two months although withdrawal symptoms, even from low-dose use, can persist for six to twelve months gradually improving over that period, however, clinically significant withdrawal symptoms may persist for years, although gradually declining.

A clinical trial of patients taking the benzodiazepine alprazolam for as short as eight weeks triggered protracted symptoms of memory deficits which were still present up to eight weeks after cessation of alprazolam.

=== Protracted withdrawal syndrome ===
Protracted withdrawal syndrome refers to symptoms persisting for months or even years. A significant minority of people withdrawing from benzodiazepines, protracted withdrawal syndrome which can sometimes be severe. Symptoms may include tinnitus, psychosis, cognitive deficits, gastrointestinal complaints, insomnia, paraesthesia (tingling and numbness), pain (usually in limbs and extremities), muscle pain, weakness, tension, painful tremor, shaking attacks, jerks, dizziness and blepharospasm and may occur even without a pre-existing history of these symptoms. Tinnitus occurring during dose reduction or discontinuation of benzodiazepines is alleviated by recommencement of benzodiazepines. Dizziness is often reported as being the withdrawal symptom that lasts the longest.

A study testing neuropsychological factors found psychophysiological markers differing from normals, and concluded that protracted withdrawal syndrome was a genuine iatrogenic condition caused by the long-term use. The causes of persisting symptoms are a combination of pharmacological factors such as persisting drug induced receptor changes, psychological factors both caused by the drug and separate from the drug and possibly in some cases, particularly high dose users, structural brain damage or structural neuronal damage. Symptoms continue to improve over time, often to the point where people eventually resume their normal lives, even after years of incapacity.

A slow withdrawal rate significantly reduces the risk of a protracted or severe withdrawal state. Protracted withdrawal symptoms can be punctuated by periods of good days and bad days. When symptoms increase periodically during protracted withdrawal, physiological changes may be present, including dilated pupils as well as an increase in blood pressure and heart rate. The change in symptoms has been proposed to be due to changes in receptor sensitivity for GABA during the process of tolerance reversal. A meta-analysis found cognitive impairments in many areas due to benzodiazepine use show improvements after six months of withdrawal, but significant impairments in most areas may be permanent or may require more than six months to reverse.

Protracted symptoms continue to fade over a period of many months or several years. There is no known cure for protracted benzodiazepine withdrawal syndrome except time, however, the medication flumazenil was found to be more effective than placebo in reducing feelings of hostility and aggression in patients who had been free of benzodiazepines for 4–266 weeks. This may suggest a role for flumazenil in treating protracted benzodiazepine withdrawal symptoms.

== Epidemiology ==
The severity and length of the withdrawal syndrome is likely determined by various factors, including rate of tapering, length of use and dosage size, and possible genetic factors. Those who have a prior history of withdrawing from benzodiazepines may have a sensitized or kindled central nervous system leading to worsening cognition and symptomatology, and making each subsequent withdrawal period worse.

== Special populations ==
=== Pediatrics ===
A neonatal withdrawal syndrome, sometimes severe, can occur when the mother had taken benzodiazepines, especially during the third trimester. Symptoms include hypotonia, apnoeic spells, cyanosis, impaired metabolic responses to cold stress, and seizures. The neonatal benzodiazepine withdrawal syndrome has been reported to persist from hours to months after birth.

A withdrawal syndrome is seen in about 20% of pediatric intensive care unit children after infusions with benzodiazepines or opioids. The likelihood of having the syndrome correlates with total infusion duration and dose, although duration is thought to be more important. Treatment for withdrawal usually involves weaning over a 3- to 21-day period if the infusion lasted for more than a week. Symptoms include tremors, agitation, sleeplessness, inconsolable crying, diarrhea and sweating. In total, over fifty withdrawal symptoms are listed in this review article. Environmental measures aimed at easing the symptoms of neonates with severe abstinence syndrome had little impact, but providing a quiet sleep environment helped in mild cases.

=== Pregnancy ===
Discontinuing benzodiazepines or antidepressants abruptly due to concerns of teratogenic effects of the medications has a high risk of causing serious complications, so is not recommended. For example, abrupt withdrawal of benzodiazepines or antidepressants has a high risk of causing extreme withdrawal symptoms, including suicidal ideation and a severe rebound effect of the return of the underlying disorder if present. This can lead to hospitalisation and potentially, suicide. One study reported one-third of mothers who suddenly discontinued or very rapidly tapered their medications became acutely suicidal due to 'unbearable symptoms'. One woman had a medical abortion, as she felt she could no longer cope, and another woman used alcohol in a bid to combat the withdrawal symptoms from benzodiazepines. Spontaneous abortions may also result from abrupt withdrawal of psychotropic medications, including benzodiazepines. The study reported physicians generally are not aware of the severe consequences of abrupt withdrawal of psychotropic medications such as benzodiazepines or antidepressants.

=== Elderly ===
A study of the elderly who were benzodiazepine dependent found withdrawal could be carried out with few complications and could lead to improvements in sleep and cognitive abilities. At 52 weeks after successful withdrawal, a 22% improvement in cognitive status was found, as well as improved social functioning. Those who remained on benzodiazepines experienced a 5% decline in cognitive abilities, which seemed to be faster than that seen in normal aging, suggesting the longer the intake of benzodiazepines, the worse the cognitive effects become. Some worsening of symptoms were seen in the first few months of benzodiazepine abstinence, but at a 24-week follow-up, elderly subjects were clearly improved compared to those who remained on benzodiazepines. Improvements in sleep were seen at the 24- and 52-week follow-ups. The authors concluded benzodiazepines were not effective in the long term for sleep problems except in suppressing withdrawal-related rebound insomnia. Improvements were seen between 24 and 52 weeks after withdrawal in many factors, including improved sleep and several cognitive and performance abilities. Some cognitive abilities, which are sensitive to benzodiazepines, as well as age, such as episodic memory, did not improve. The authors, however, cited a study in younger patients who at a 3.5-year follow-up showed no memory impairments and speculated that certain memory functions take longer to recover from chronic benzodiazepine use and further improvements in elderly people's cognitive function may occur beyond 52 weeks after withdrawal. The reason it took 24 weeks for improvements to be seen after cessation of benzodiazepine use was due to the time it takes the brain to adapt to the benzodiazepine-free environment.

At 24 weeks, significant improvements were found, including accuracy of information processing improved, but a decline was seen in those who remained on benzodiazepines. Further improvements were noted at the 52-week follow-up, indicating ongoing improvements with benzodiazepine abstinence. Younger people on benzodiazepines also experience cognitive deterioration in visual-spatial memory but are not as vulnerable as the elderly to the cognitive effects. Improved reaction times were noted at 52 weeks in elderly patients free from benzodiazepines. This is an important function in the elderly, especially if they drive a car due to the increased risk of road traffic accidents in benzodiazepine users. At the 24-week follow-up, 80% of people had successfully withdrawn from benzodiazepines. Part of the success was attributed to the placebo method used for part of the trial which broke the psychological dependence on benzodiazepines when the elderly patients realised they had completed their gradual reduction several weeks previously and had only been taking placebo tablets. This helped reassure them they could sleep without their pills.

The authors also warned of the similarities in pharmacology and mechanism of action of the newer nonbenzodiazepine Z-drugs.

The elimination half-life of diazepam and chlordiazepoxide, as well as other long half-life benzodiazepines, is twice as long in the elderly compared to younger individuals. Many doctors do not adjust benzodiazepine dosage according to age in elderly patients.

== See also ==
- Alcohol withdrawal syndrome
- Benzodiazepine dependence
- List of benzodiazepines
- Opioid withdrawal
- Physical dependence
- Post-acute-withdrawal syndrome
- Rebound effect
- Antidepressant discontinuation syndrome
- Neuroleptic discontinuation syndrome
- Tapering (medicine)
