= Kindling (sedative–hypnotic withdrawal) =

- Specialty: Neurology, psychiatry

Kindling due to substance withdrawal is the neurological condition which results from repeated withdrawal episodes from sedative–hypnotic drugs such as alcohol and benzodiazepines.

Each withdrawal leads to more severe withdrawal symptoms than in previous episodes. Individuals who have had more withdrawal episodes are at an increased risk of very severe withdrawal symptoms, up to and including seizures and death. Long-term activation of the GABA receptor by sedative–hypnotic drugs causes chronic GABA receptor downregulation as well as glutamate overactivity, which can lead to drug and neurotransmitter sensitization, central nervous system hyperexcitability, and excitotoxicity.

== Symptoms ==
Binge drinking is believed to increase impulsivity due to altered functioning of prefrontal–subcortical and orbitofrontal circuits. Binge drinking in alcoholics who have undergone repeated detoxification is associated with an inability to interpret facial expressions properly; this is believed to be due to kindling of the amygdala with resultant distortion of neurotransmission. Adolescents, females and young adults are most sensitive to the neuropsychological effects of binge drinking. Adolescence, particularly early adolescence, is a developmental stage which is particularly vulnerable to the neurotoxic and neurocognitive adverse effects of binge drinking due to it being a time of significant brain development.

Approximately 3 percent of people who are alcohol dependent experience psychosis during acute intoxication or withdrawal. Alcohol-related psychosis may manifest itself through a kindling mechanism. The mechanism of alcohol-related psychosis is due to distortions to neuronal membranes, gene expression, as well as thiamine deficiency. It is possible in some cases that alcohol abuse via a kindling mechanism can cause the development of a chronic substance-induced psychotic disorder (e.g., schizophrenia). The effects of an alcohol-related psychosis include an increased risk of depression and suicide as well as psychosocial impairments.

Repeated acute intoxication followed by acute withdrawal is associated with profound behavioural changes and neurobiological alterations in several brain regions. Much of the documented evidence of kindling caused by repeated detoxification regards increased seizure frequency. Increased fear and anxiety and cognitive impairments are also associated with alcohol withdrawal kindling due to binge drinking or alcoholics with repeated alcohol withdrawal experiences. The impairments induced by binge drinking or repeated detoxification of alcoholics cause a loss of behavioural inhibition of the prefrontal cortex; the prefrontal cortex is mediated by subcortical systems such as the amygdala. This loss of behavioral control due to brain impairment predisposes an individual to alcoholism and increases the risk of an abstaining alcoholic relapsing. This impairment may also result in long-term adverse effects on emotional behavior. Impaired associative learning may make behavioural therapies involving conditioning approaches for alcoholics less effective.

== Causes ==
Binge drinking regimes are associated with causing an imbalance between inhibitory and excitatory amino acids and changes in monoamine release in the central nervous system, which increases neurotoxicity; this may result in cognitive impairments, psychological problems, and may cause irreversible brain damage in both adolescent and adult long-term binge drinkers. Similar to binge drinkers, individuals suffering from alcohol dependence develop changes to neurotransmitter systems, which occur as a result of kindling and sensitization during withdrawal. This progressively lowers the threshold needed to cause alcohol-related brain damage and cognitive impairments, leading to altered neurological function. The changes in activity of excitatory and inhibitory neurotransmitter systems is similar to that which occurs in individuals suffering from limbic or temporal lobe epilepsy.

Adaptational changes at the GABA_{A} benzodiazepine receptor complex do not fully explain tolerance, dependence, and withdrawal from benzodiazepines. Other receptor complexes may be involved; in particular, the excitatory glutamate system is implicated. The involvement of glutamate in benzodiazepine dependence explains long-term potentiation as well as neuro-kindling phenomena. There is some evidence that a prior history of CNS depressant dependence (e.g. alcohol) increases the risk of dependence on benzodiazepines. Tolerance to drugs is commonly believed to be due to receptor down-regulation; however, there is very limited evidence to support this, and this hypothesis comes from animal studies using very high doses. Instead, other mechanisms, such as receptor uncoupling, may play a more important role in the development of benzodiazepine dependence; this may lead to prolonged conformational changes in the receptors or altered subunit composition of the receptors.

== Pathophysiology ==
=== Benzodiazepines ===
Repeated benzodiazepine withdrawal episodes may result in similar neuronal kindling as that seen after repeated withdrawal episodes from alcohol, with resultant increased neuro-excitability. The glutamate system is believed to play an important role in this kindling phenomenon with AMPA receptors which are a subtype of glutamate receptors being altered by repeated withdrawals from benzodiazepines. The changes which occur after withdrawal in AMPA receptors in animals have been found in regions of the brain which govern anxiety and seizure threshold; thus kindling may result in increased severity of anxiety and a lowered seizure threshold during repeated withdrawal. Changes in the glutamate system and GABA system may play an important role at different time points during benzodiazepine withdrawal syndrome.

=== Alcohol ===
Binge drinking may induce brain damage due to the repeated cycle of acute intoxication followed by an acute abstinence withdrawal state. Based on animal studies, regular binge drinking in the long-term is thought to be more likely to result in brain damage than chronic (daily) alcoholism. This is due to the 4- to 5-fold increase in glutamate release in nucleus accumbens during the acute withdrawal state between binges, but only in dose 3 g/kg, in 2 g/kg— there is no increase in glutamate release. In contrast, during withdrawal from chronic alcoholism only a 2- to 3-fold increase in glutamate release occurs. The high levels of glutamate release causes a chain reaction in other neurotransmitter systems. The reason that chronic sustained alcoholism is thought by some researchers to be less brain damaging than binge drinking is because tolerance develops to the effects of alcohol and unlike binge drinking repeated periods of acute withdrawal does not occur, but there are also many alcoholics who typically drink in binges followed by periods of no drinking. Excessive glutamate release is a known major cause of neuronal cell death. Glutamate causes neurotoxicity due to excitotoxicity and oxidative glutamate toxicity. Evidence from animal studies suggests that some people may be more genetically sensitive to the neurotoxic and brain damage associated with binge drinking regimes. Binge drinking activates microglial cells which leads to the release of inflammatory cytokines and mediators such as tumour necrosis factor, and nitric oxide causing neuroinflammation leading to neuronal destruction.

Repeated acute withdrawal from alcohol which occurs in heavy binge drinkers has been shown in several studies to be associated with cognitive deficits as a result of neural kindling; neural kindling due to repeated withdrawals is believed to be the mechanism of cognitive damage in both binge drinkers and alcoholics. Neural kindling may explain the advancing pathogenesis and progressively deteriorating course of alcoholism and explain continued alcohol abuse as due to avoidance of distressing acute withdrawal symptoms which get worse with each withdrawal. Multiple withdrawals from alcohol is associated with long-term nonverbal memory impairment in adolescents and to poor memory in adult alcoholics. Adult alcoholics who experienced two or more withdrawals showed more frontal lobe impairments than alcoholics who had a history of one or no prior alcohol withdrawals. The finding of kindling in alcoholism is consistent with the mechanism of brain damage due to binge drinking and subsequent withdrawal.

== Diagnosis ==
=== Definition ===
Kindling refers to the phenomenon of increasingly severe withdrawal symptoms, including an increased risk of seizures, that occurs as a result of repeated withdrawal from alcohol or other sedative–hypnotics with related modes of action. Ethanol (alcohol) has a very similar mechanism of tolerance and withdrawal to benzodiazepines, involving the GABA_{A} receptors, NMDA receptors and AMPA receptors, but the majority of research into kindling has primarily focused on alcohol. An intensification of anxiety and other psychological symptoms of alcohol withdrawal also occurs.

== Treatment ==
Failure to manage the alcohol withdrawal syndrome appropriately can lead to permanent brain damage or death.

Acamprosate, a drug used to promote abstinence from alcohol, an NMDA antagonist drug, reduces excessive glutamate activity in the central nervous system and thereby may reduce excitotoxicity and withdrawal related brain damage.

== See also ==
- Kindling model
