= Learned intermediary =

Defense doctrine, American, Canadian law

Learned intermediary is a defense doctrine used in the legal system of the United States. This doctrine states that a manufacturer of a product has fulfilled its duty of care when it provides all of the necessary information to a "learned intermediary" who then interacts with the consumer of a product. This doctrine is primarily used by pharmaceutical and medical device manufacturers in defense of tort suits.

In a clear majority of states, the courts have accepted this as a liability shield for pharmaceutical companies.

This doctrine was adopted by the Supreme Court of Canada in Hollis v Dow Corning Corp., 129 DLR 609 (1995).

== History ==
The use of the term "learned intermediary" was first used in the Eighth Circuit decision of Sterling Drug v. Cornish (370 F.2d 82, 85), in 1966, and has now become the prevailing doctrine in the majority of jurisdictions in the United States.

== Dissent ==
Recently, this doctrine has been called into question due to the increased use of direct to consumer advertising, whereby drug manufacturers market pharmaceutical products to individuals rather than to doctors. For example, in Rimbert v. Eli Lilly & Co., 577 F. Supp. 2d 1174, 1218-19 (D. N.M. 2008), the District Court of New Mexico reasoned that the "dramatically increased marketing directed to consumers . . . would persuade the Supreme Court of New Mexico that the justification for the learned-intermediary doctrine is quickly becoming, if not already the case, outdated." However, other recent cases have declined to adopt this so-called "direct-to-consumer advertising" exception to the learned intermediary doctrine. See DiBartolo v. Abbott Labs., 2012 WL 6681704 (S.D.N.Y. Dec.21, 2012), Centocor Inc. v. Hamilton, 372 S.W.3d 140, 161 (Tex. 2012), Calisi v. Abbott Labs., 2013 WL 5462274 (D. Mass. Feb. 25, 2013).
