= Memory clinic =

Clinic specializing in memory disorder diagnosis and treatment

A memory clinic is a dedicated medical clinic specialising in the assessment and diagnosis of memory disorders. Memory clinics were first seen in the UK in the 1980s, mainly in academic research centres. There are by 2009 approximately 246 memory clinics but there are no official NHS figures and no specific standards or set models relating to them. The National Service Framework (NSF) for Older People stipulates that every specialist mental health service for older people should have a memory clinic (article 7.49) but it gives no specific guidelines for establishing one.
