= Post-acute-withdrawal syndrome =

Long-term psychological symptoms following drug withdrawal

- Other names: Post-withdrawal syndrome, protracted withdrawal syndrome, prolonged withdrawal syndrome
- Specialty: Psychiatry, Toxicology

Post-acute withdrawal syndrome (PAWS) is the prolonged psychological symptoms following a physical acute withdrawal from many drugs including alcohol, opioids, benzodiazepines, and barbiturates. It is caused by the brain adjusting from being addicted to a certain substance and can last all the way from a few months up to a few years. Infants born to mothers who used these substances during pregnancy may also experience PAWS.

The brain can have a hard time adjusting to changes following the physical detoxification from a substance, thus causing many psychological symptoms to occur including prolonged psychosis, anxiety or depression. PAWS can occur with symptoms persisting from months to years after cessation of substance use. In almost all cases drug-induced psychiatric disorders fade away with prolonged abstinence, although permanent damage to the brain and nervous system may be caused by continued substance use.

== Signs and symptoms ==
Symptoms can sometimes come and go with wave-like re-occurrences or fluctuations in severity of symptoms. Common symptoms include impaired cognition, irritability, depressed mood, and anxiety, and can lead to relapse.

PAWS as a result of benzodiazepines, opioids, and alcohol in particular can produce symptoms identical to generalized anxiety disorder as well as panic disorder. Due to the sometimes prolonged nature and severity of these withdrawals, abrupt sobriety from these substances is not advised.

Some symptoms of PAWS include:

- Psychosocial dysfunction
- Anhedonia
- Depression
- Impaired interpersonal skills
- Obsessive-compulsive behaviour
- Feelings of guilt
- Autonomic disturbances
- Pessimistic thoughts
- Impaired attentional control
- Lack of initiative
- Craving
- Inability to think clearly
- Memory problems
- Emotional overreactions or numbness
- Sleep disturbances
- Extreme fatigue
- Physical coordination problems
- Stress sensitivity
- Increased sensitivity to pain
- Panic disorder
- Psychosis
- Generalized anxiety disorder
- Sleep disturbance (dreams of using, behaviors associated with the life style)
- Mourning (the change in lifestyle)

Symptoms occur intermittently, but are not always present. They are made worse by stress or other triggers and may arise at unexpected times and for no apparent reason. They may last for a short while or longer. Any of the following may trigger a temporary return or worsening of the symptoms of PAWS:

- Stressful and/or frustrating situations
- Multitasking
- Feelings of anxiety, fearfulness or anger
- Social conflicts
- Unrealistic expectations of oneself

=== Post-acute benzodiazepine withdrawal ===
Disturbances in mental function can persist for several months or years after withdrawal from benzodiazepines. Psychotic depression persisting for more than a year following benzodiazepine withdrawal has been documented in the medical literature. The patient had no prior psychiatric history. The symptoms reported in the patient included, major depressive disorder with psychotic features, including persistent depressed mood, poor concentration, decreased appetite, insomnia, anhedonia, anergia and psychomotor retardation. The patient also experienced paranoid ideation (believing she was being poisoned and persecuted by co-employees), accompanied by sensory hallucinations. Symptoms developed after abrupt withdrawal of chlordiazepoxide and persisted for 14 months. Various psychiatric medications were trialed which were unsuccessful in alleviating the symptomatology. Symptoms were completely relieved by recommending chlordiazepoxide for irritable bowel syndrome 14 months later. Another case report noted a similar phenomenon in a female patient who abruptly reduced her diazepam dosage from 30 mg to 5 mg per day. She developed electric shock sensations, depersonalization, anxiety, dizziness, left temporal lobe EEG spiking activity, hallucinations, visual perceptual and sensory distortions which persisted for years.

A clinical trial of patients taking the benzodiazepine alprazolam (Xanax) for eight weeks triggered protracted symptoms of memory deficits which were still present after up to eight weeks post cessation of alprazolam.

=== Dopamine agonist protracted withdrawal ===
After long-term use of dopamine agonists, a withdrawal syndrome may occur during dose reduction or discontinuation with the following possible side effects: anxiety, panic attacks, dysphoria, depression, agitation, irritability, suicidal ideation, fatigue, orthostatic hypotension, nausea, vomiting, diaphoresis, generalized pain, and drug cravings. For some individuals, these withdrawal symptoms are short-lived and make a full recovery, for others a protracted withdrawal syndrome may occur with withdrawal symptoms persisting for months or years.

== Cause ==
The syndrome is caused in part due to persisting physiological adaptations in the central nervous system manifested in the form of continuing but slowly reversible tolerance, disturbances in neurotransmitters and resultant hyperexcitability of neuronal pathways. However, data supports "neuronal and overwhelming cognitive normalization" in regards to chronic methamphetamine use and PAWS. Stressful situations that arise in early recovery may result in the symptoms of post-acute withdrawal syndrome to worsen and should be avoided when necessary. The severity, frequency, and duration of symptoms associated with the condition vary depending on the drug of use.

== Treatment ==
The condition gradually improves over a period of time which can range from six months to several years in more severe cases.

Flumazenil was found to be effective in reducing feelings of hostility and aggression in patients who had been free of benzodiazepines for 4 to 266 weeks. This may suggest a role for flumazenil in treating protracted benzodiazepine withdrawal symptoms.

Acamprosate has also been found to be effective in alleviating some of the post acute withdrawal symptoms of alcohol withdrawal. Carbamazepine or trazodone may also be effective in the treatment of post acute withdrawal syndrome in regards to alcohol use. Cognitive behavioral therapy can also help the post acute withdrawal syndrome especially when cravings are a prominent feature.

== See also ==
- Alcohol withdrawal syndrome
- Antidepressant discontinuation syndrome
- Benzodiazepine withdrawal syndrome
- Opioid use disorder
