= Cross-tolerance =

Physiological tolerance to similar drugs

Cross-tolerance is a phenomenon that occurs when tolerance to the effects of a certain drug produces tolerance to another drug. It often happens between two drugs with similar functions or effects—for example, acting on the same cell receptor or affecting the transmission of certain neurotransmitters. Cross-tolerance has been observed with pharmaceutical drugs such as anti-anxiety agents and illicit substances, and sometimes the two of them together. Often, a person who uses one drug can be tolerant to a drug that has a completely different function. This phenomenon allows one to become tolerant to a drug that they have never used before.

== Drug classifications and cross-tolerance ==
Groups of psychoactive drugs	Drug examples
Anxiolytics and sedatives	Benzodiazepines (diazepam, alprazolam, clonazepam), Z-drugs, barbiturates, ethanol (Alcohol), phenibut
Antipsychotics	Phenothiazines (chlorpromazine), butyrophenones (haloperidol), clozapine, aripiprazole
Antidepressants	MAO inhibitors (tranylcypromine, phenelzine, selegiline) tricyclic antidepressants (imipramine), SSRIs (fluoxetine, sertraline, paroxetine)
Mood stabilizers	lithium, sodium valproate, carbamazepine
Opioid analgesics	morphine, oxycodone, heroin, fentanyl, endogenous opioids (endomorphins, enkephalins, dynorphins)
Psychedelics	LSD, mescaline, psilocybin
Dissociatives	PCP, ketamine, Dextromethorphan
Stimulants	Cocaine, amphetamine, methylphenidate, ephedrine

=== Anxiolytics and sedatives ===
Excitation of the GABA receptor produces an influx of negatively charged chloride ions, which hyperpolarizes the neuron and makes it less likely to give rise to an action potential. In addition to gamma-Aminobutyric acid (GABA) itself, the GABA_{A} receptor can also bind barbiturates and benzodiazepines. Benzodiazepine binding increases the binding of GABA and barbiturates maximize the time the pore is open. Both of these mechanisms allow for influx of chloride ions. When these drugs are taken together, especially with ethanol (drinking alcohol), there is a disproportionate increase in toxicity because the effects of both occur simultaneously and add up since they act on the same receptor at different sites. Convergence upon the GABA_{A} receptor is why tolerance for one drug in the group will most likely cause cross-tolerance for the other drugs in the group. However, the barbiturates are also AMPA receptor blockers, and in addition interact with the nAChR and voltage-gated calcium channels. As a result, somebody who is tolerant to benzodiazepines is more sensitive to barbiturates than vice versa.

=== Antipsychotics ===
These drugs block dopamine receptors and some also block serotonin receptors (such as chlorpromazine, the first antipsychotic used clinically). Having been on one or more antipsychotics for any appreciable amount of time results in dramatically reduced sensitivity to others with similar mechanisms of action. However, an antipsychotic with a substantial disparity in pharmacology (e.g. haloperidol and quetiapine) may retain significant efficacy.

=== Antidepressants and mood stabilizers ===
MAO inhibitor drugs block an enzyme system resulting in increased stores of monoamine neurotransmitters. More common antidepressants such as tricyclic antidepressants and SSRIs block reuptake transporters causing increased levels of norepinephrine or serotonin in synapses. Mood stabilizers include lithium and many anticonvulsants, such as carbamazepine and lamotrigine are also used for mood disorders. This would demonstrate little to zero cross-tolerance with serotonergic or lithium treatment.

=== Opioid analgesics ===
These drugs mimic three classes of endorphins, such as endomorphins, enkephalins, and dynorphins. All three of these classes each have their own receptor-mu, kappa, and delta. Opioids will bind to the receptor for the endorphin they are most chemically similar to. Tolerance to some effects occurs with regular use, a result of the downregulation of the stimulated opioid receptors. Cross tolerance to analgesia may develop incompletely and less rapidly, allowing rotation between opioid medications be used to compensate somewhat for tolerance. This phenomenon is called incomplete cross-tolerance.

=== Stimulants ===
Cocaine, amphetamines, methylphenidate and ephedrine block the reuptake of dopamine and norepinephrine. With increasing doses, amphetamines also cause the direct release of these neurotransmitters.

=== Psychedelics ===
Serotonergic psychedelics act through modulation of serotonin receptors. Most of these drugs share a high affinity for the 5-HT_{2A} receptor subtype, known to result in their common perceptual and psychological effects.

== Cross-tolerance between drugs of different classifications ==
Sometimes cross-tolerance occurs between two drugs that do not share mechanisms of action or classification. For example, in rats some amphetamine-like stimulants have been shown to exhibit cross-tolerance with caffeine, though this effect was not observed with amphetamine itself. It is likely that this mechanism of cross-tolerance involves the dopamine receptor D_{1}. Amphetamines also have cross-tolerance with pseudoephedrine, as pseudoephedrine can block dopamine uptake in the same manner that amphetamines do, but less potently.

Alcohol is another substance that often exhibits cross-tolerance with other drugs. Findings of cross-tolerance with nicotine in animal models suggest that it is also possible in humans, and may explain why the two drugs are often used together. Numerous studies have also suggested the possibility of cross-tolerance between alcohol and cannabis.

Cigarette smoking produces increased metabolic tolerance to caffeine due to upregulation of the CYP1A enzyme family (see aryl hydrocarbon receptor).
