= Confusion =

State of being bewildered or unclear in one's mind about something

- Specialty: Psychology, psychiatry

In psychology, confusion is the quality or emotional state of being bewildered or disoriented. The term acute mental confusion is often used interchangeably with delirium in the International Statistical Classification of Diseases and Related Health Problems and the Medical Subject Headings publications to describe the pathology. These refer to the loss of orientation, or the ability to place oneself correctly in the world by time, location and personal identity. Mental confusion is sometimes accompanied by disordered consciousness (the loss of linear thinking) and memory loss (the inability to correctly recall previous events or learn new material).

== Etymology ==
The word confusion derives from the Latin verb confundere, which means "confuse, mix, blend, pour together, disorder, embroil."

== Causes ==
Confusion may result from drug side effects or from a relatively sudden brain dysfunction. Acute confusion is often called delirium (or "acute confusional state"), although delirium often includes a much broader array of disorders than simple confusion. These disorders include the inability to focus attention; various impairments in awareness, and temporal or spatial dis-orientation. Mental confusion can result from chronic organic brain pathologies, such as dementia, as well.

=== Other ===
- Acute stress reaction
- Alcoholism
- Anemia
- Anticholinergic toxicity
- Anxiety
- Brain damage
- Concussion
- Dehydration
- Encephalopathy
- Epileptic seizure
- Depression
- Fatigue
- Fever
- Brain injury
- Heat stroke
- Hypoglycemia
- Hypothermia
- Hypothyroidism
- Jet lag
- Kidney failure
- Kidney infection (pyelonephritis)
- Lactic acidosis
- Lassa fever
- Lewy body dementia
- Listeria
- Lyme disease
- Meningitis
- Postpartum depression & Postpartum psychosis
- Psychotic Disorder
- Reye's syndrome
- Rocky Mountain spotted fever (RMSF)
- Schizophrenia
- Sick building syndrome
- Sleep apnea
- Stroke
- Yellow fever
- STDs & STIs
- Streptococcal Infections
- Toxicity
- Toxic shock syndrome
- Transient ischemic attack (TIA, Mini-Stroke)
- Vitamin B_{12} deficiency
- Acute Porphyria
- West Nile virus

=== Differential diagnosis ===
The most common causes of drug induced acute confusion are dopaminergic drugs (used for the treatment of Parkinson's disease), diuretics, tricyclic, tetracyclic antidepressants and benzodiazepines or alcohol. The elderly, and especially those with pre-existing dementia, are most at risk for drug induced acute confusional states. New research is finding a link between vitamin D deficiency and cognitive impairment (which includes "foggy brain").

== See also ==
- Cognitive distortion
