= Adderall =

Drug mixture used mainly to treat ADHD and narcolepsy

Amphetamine/dextroamphetamine salt mixture (1:1) (Note: Salts of racemic amphetamine and dextroamphetamine are mixed in a (1:1) ratio to produce this drug. Because the racemate is composed of equal parts dextroamphetamine and levoamphetamine, this drug can also be described as a mixture of the D and (L)-enantiomers of amphetamine in a (3:1) ratio, although none of the components of the mixture are levoamphetamine salts.)

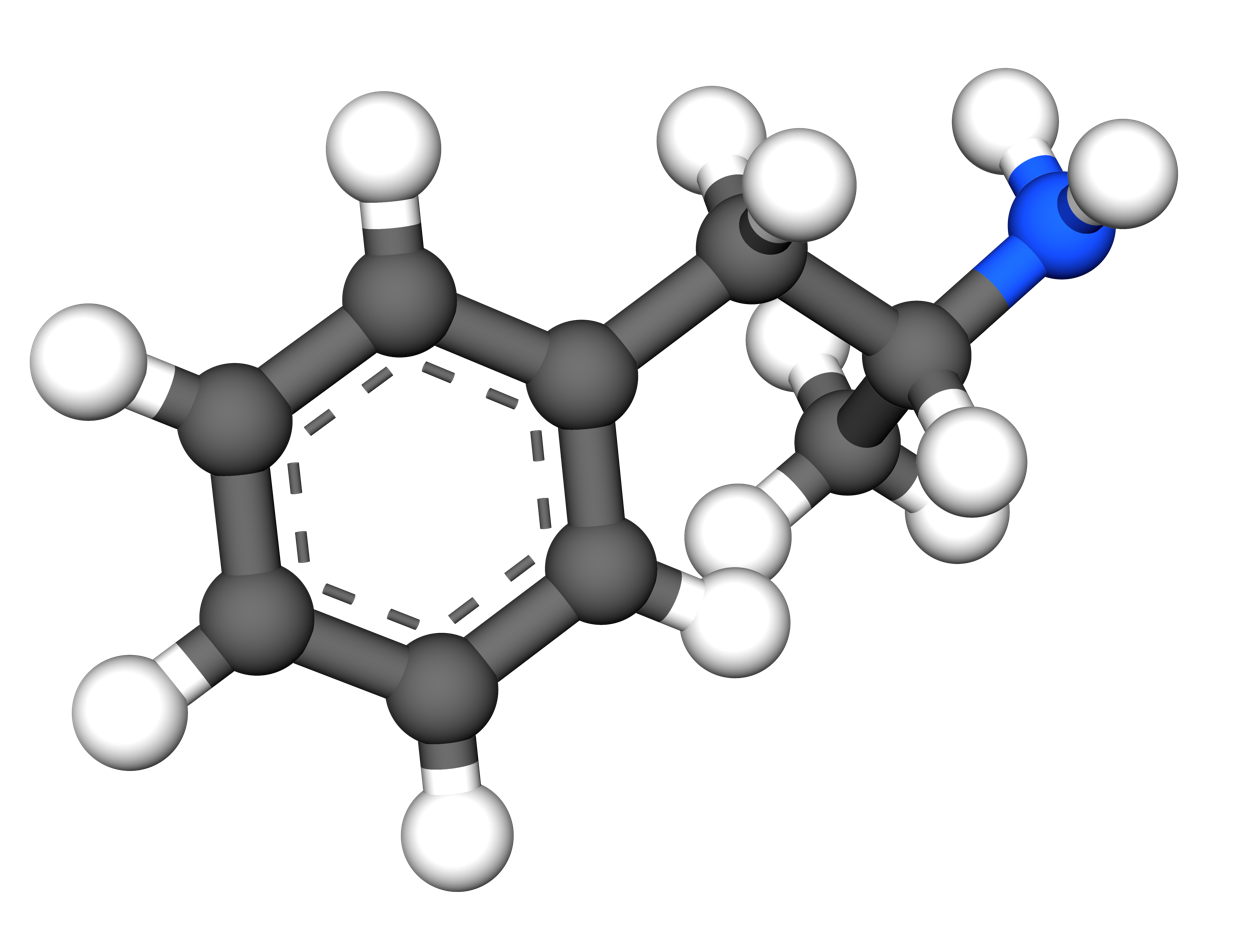

Combination of
- Amphetamine aspartate monohydrate: 25% – stimulant (12.5% levo; 12.5% dextro)
- Amphetamine sulfate: 25% – stimulant (12.5% levo; 12.5% dextro)
- Dextroamphetamine saccharate: 25% – stimulant (0% levo; 25% dextro)
- Dextroamphetamine sulfate: 25% – stimulant (0% levo; 25% dextro)

Clinical data
- Trade names: Adderall, Adderall XR, others
- Other names: Mixed amphetamine salts; MAS
- AHFS/Drugs.com: Monograph
- MedlinePlus: a601234
- License data: US DailyMed: Adderall
- Dependence liability: Moderate – high
- Routes of administration: Medical: Oral; Recreational: Oral, insufflation, rectal, sublingual
- ATC code: N06BA02 (WHO) N06BA01 (WHO)

Legal status
- Legal status: AU: S8 (Controlled drug); CA: Schedule I; DE: Anlage III (Special prescription form required); NZ: Class B; UK: Class B; US: Schedule II; UN: Psychotropic Schedule II

Pharmacokinetic data
- Bioavailability: Oral: ~90%

Identifiers
- CAS Number: 300-62-9; 51-64-9
- PubChem CID: 3007
- IUPHAR/BPS: 4804
- DrugBank: DB00182
- ChemSpider: 13852819
- UNII: CK833KGX7E
- KEGG: D11624
- ChEBI: CHEBI:2679
- ChEMBL: ChEMBL405

Adderall is the brand name of a fixed-dose combination medication used for the treatment of attention deficit hyperactivity disorder (ADHD) and narcolepsy. It is also used as an athletic performance enhancer, cognitive enhancer, appetite suppressant, and recreationally as a euphoriant. Such uses are illegal in many countries. It is a central nervous system (CNS) stimulant of the phenethylamine class. It contains the amphetamines dextroamphetamine saccharate, amphetamine aspartate, dextroamphetamine sulfate, and amphetamine sulfate. It is taken by mouth.

At therapeutic doses, Adderall causes emotional and cognitive effects such as euphoria, change in sex drive, increased wakefulness, and improved cognitive control. At these doses, it induces physical effects such as a faster reaction time, fatigue resistance, and increased muscle strength. In contrast, much larger doses of Adderall can impair cognitive control, cause rapid muscle breakdown, provoke panic attacks, or induce psychosis (e.g., paranoia, delusions, hallucinations). The side effects vary widely among individuals but most commonly include insomnia, dry mouth, loss of appetite and weight loss. The routine use of Adderall at higher-than-prescribed doses poses a significant risk of addiction or dependence due to the pronounced reinforcing effects that are present at high doses. Recreational doses of Adderall are generally much larger than prescribed therapeutic doses and also carry a far greater risk of serious adverse effects.

The two amphetamine enantiomers that compose Adderall, such as Adderall tablets/capsules (levoamphetamine and dextroamphetamine), alleviate the symptoms of ADHD and narcolepsy by increasing the activity of the neurotransmitters norepinephrine and dopamine in the brain, which results in part from their interactions with human trace amine-associated receptor 1 (hTAAR1) and vesicular monoamine transporter 2 (VMAT2) in neurons. Dextroamphetamine is a more potent CNS stimulant than levoamphetamine, but levoamphetamine has slightly stronger cardiovascular and peripheral effects and a longer elimination half-life than dextroamphetamine. The active ingredient in Adderall, amphetamine, shares many chemical and pharmacological properties with the human trace amines, particularly phenethylamine and N-methylphenethylamine, the latter of which is a positional isomer of amphetamine. In 2024, Adderall was the fifteenth most commonly prescribed medication in the United States, with more than 36 million prescriptions.

== Uses ==
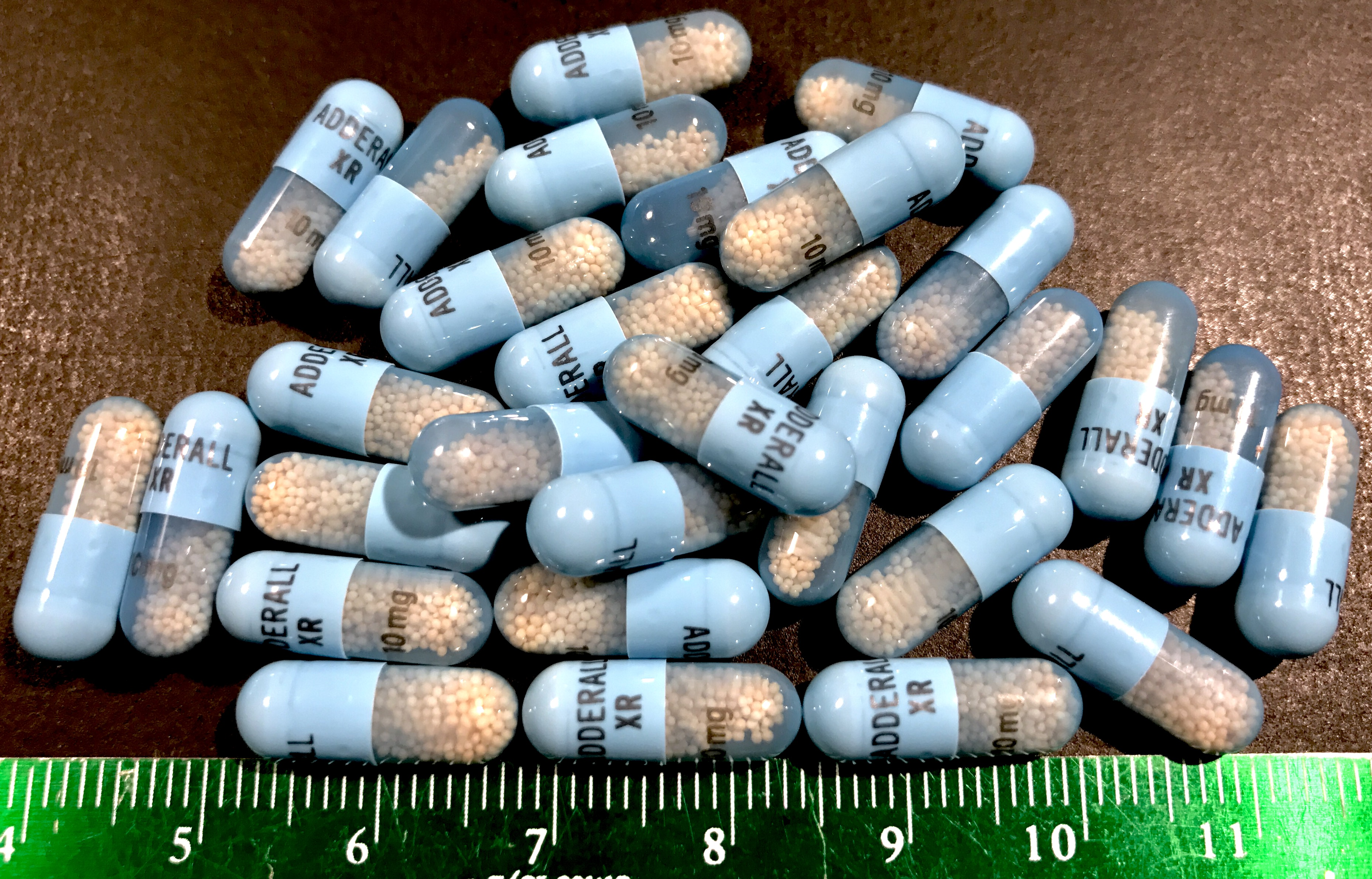
30 capsules of 10 mg Adderall XR

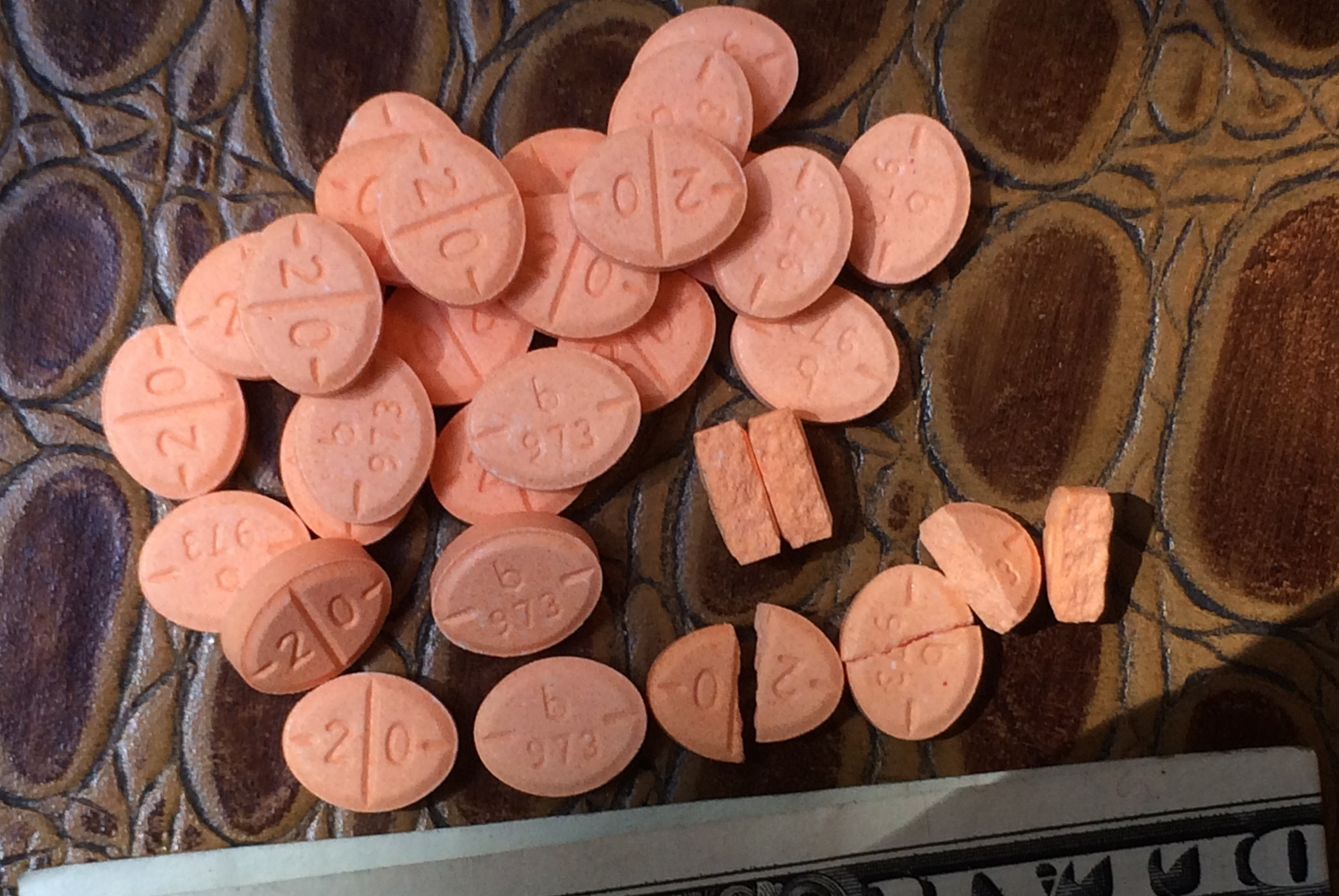
A group of generic 20 mg Adderall tablets, some broken in half, with a lengthwise-folded US dollar bill along the bottom (3.07 inches; 7.8 cm) for size comparison

=== Medical ===
Adderall is indicated for the treatment of attention deficit hyperactivity disorder (ADHD) and narcolepsy.

==== ADHD ====
Long-term amphetamine exposure at sufficiently high doses in some animal species is known to produce abnormal dopamine system development or nerve damage, but, in humans with ADHD, long-term use of pharmaceutical amphetamines at therapeutic doses appears to improve brain development and nerve growth. Reviews of magnetic resonance imaging (MRI) studies suggest that long-term treatment with amphetamine decreases abnormalities in brain structure and function found in subjects with ADHD, and improves function in several parts of the brain, such as the right caudate nucleus of the basal ganglia.

Reviews of clinical stimulant research have established the safety and effectiveness of long-term continuous amphetamine use for the treatment of ADHD. Randomized controlled trials of continuous stimulant therapy for the treatment of ADHD spanning 2 years have demonstrated treatment effectiveness and safety. Two reviews have indicated that long-term continuous stimulant therapy for ADHD is effective for reducing the core symptoms of ADHD (i.e., hyperactivity, inattention, and impulsivity), enhancing quality of life and academic achievement, and producing improvements in a large number of functional outcomes (Note: The ADHD-related outcome domains with the greatest proportion of significantly improved outcomes from long-term continuous stimulant therapy include academics (≈55% of academic outcomes improved), driving (100% of driving outcomes improved), non-medical drug use (47% of addiction-related outcomes improved), obesity (≈65% of obesity-related outcomes improved), self-esteem (50% of self-esteem outcomes improved), and social function (67% of social function outcomes improved). The largest effect sizes for outcome improvements from long-term stimulant therapy occur in the domains involving academics (e.g., grade point average, achievement test scores, length of education, and education level), self-esteem (e.g., self-esteem questionnaire assessments, number of suicide attempts, and suicide rates), and social function (e.g., peer nomination scores, social skills, and quality of peer, family, and romantic relationships). Long-term combination therapy for ADHD (i.e., treatment with both a stimulant and behavioral therapy) produces even larger effect sizes for outcome improvements and improves a larger proportion of outcomes across each domain compared to long-term stimulant therapy alone. These findings were further supported by a 2025 review of interventions for adolescents, which concluded that medications and cognitive-behavioral treatments (CBT) provide complementary benefits. Medications demonstrated strong short-term efficacy on core symptoms, while CBT contributed modest to strong, and sometimes long-lasting, improvements in functional impairments and executive skills when used as part of combination therapy.) across 9 categories of outcomes related to academics, antisocial behavior, driving, non-medicinal drug use, obesity, occupation, self-esteem, service use (i.e., academic, occupational, health, financial, and legal services), and social function. Additionally, a 2024 meta-analytic systematic review reported moderate improvements in quality of life when amphetamine treatment is used for ADHD. One review highlighted a nine-month randomized controlled trial of amphetamine treatment for ADHD in children that found an average increase of 4.5 IQ points, continued increases in attention, and continued decreases in disruptive behaviors and hyperactivity. Another review indicated that, based upon the longest follow-up studies conducted to date, lifetime stimulant therapy that begins during childhood is continuously effective for controlling ADHD symptoms and reduces the risk of developing a substance use disorder as an adult.

Models of ADHD suggest that it is associated with functional impairments in some of the brain's neurotransmitter systems; these functional impairments involve impaired dopamine neurotransmission in the mesocorticolimbic projection and norepinephrine neurotransmission in the noradrenergic projections from the locus coeruleus to the prefrontal cortex. Stimulants like methylphenidate and amphetamine are effective in treating ADHD because they increase neurotransmitter activity in these systems. Approximately 80% of those who use these stimulants see improvements in ADHD symptoms. Children with ADHD who use stimulant medications generally have better relationships with peers and family members, perform better in school, are less distractible and impulsive, and have longer attention spans. The Cochrane reviews (Note: Cochrane reviews are high quality meta-analytic systematic reviews of randomized controlled trials.) on the treatment of ADHD in children, adolescents, and adults with pharmaceutical amphetamines stated that short-term studies have demonstrated that these drugs decrease the severity of symptoms, but they have higher discontinuation rates than non-stimulant medications due to their adverse side effects. However, a 2025 meta-analytic systematic review of 113 randomized controlled trials found that stimulant medications were the only intervention with robust short-term efficacy, and were associated with lower all-cause treatment discontinuation rates than non-stimulant medications (e.g., atomoxetine). (Note: In contrast to the Cochrane reviews that observed higher treatment discontinuation from adverse effects alone, this figure represents any cause of discontinuation (e.g., insufficient perceived treatment benefit).) A Cochrane review on the treatment of ADHD in children with tic disorders such as Tourette syndrome indicated that stimulants in general do not make tics worse, but high doses of dextroamphetamine could exacerbate tics in some individuals.

==== Narcolepsy ====
Narcolepsy is a chronic sleep-wake disorder that is associated with excessive daytime sleepiness, cataplexy, and sleep paralysis. Patients with narcolepsy are diagnosed as either type 1 or type 2, with only the former presenting cataplexy symptoms. Type 1 narcolepsy results from the loss of approximately 70,000 orexin-releasing neurons in the lateral hypothalamus, leading to significantly reduced cerebrospinal orexin levels; this reduction is a diagnostic biomarker for type 1 narcolepsy. Lateral hypothalamic orexin neurons innervate every component of the ascending reticular activating system (ARAS), which includes noradrenergic, dopaminergic, histaminergic, and serotonergic nuclei that promote wakefulness.

Amphetamine's therapeutic mode of action in narcolepsy primarily involves increasing monoamine neurotransmitter activity in the ARAS. This includes noradrenergic neurons in the locus coeruleus, dopaminergic neurons in the ventral tegmental area, histaminergic neurons in the tuberomammillary nucleus, and serotonergic neurons in the dorsal raphe nucleus. Dextroamphetamine, the more dopaminergic enantiomer of amphetamine, is particularly effective at promoting wakefulness because dopamine release has the greatest influence on cortical activation and cognitive arousal, relative to other monoamines. In contrast, levoamphetamine may have a greater effect on cataplexy, a symptom more sensitive to the effects of norepinephrine and serotonin. Noradrenergic and serotonergic nuclei in the ARAS are involved in the regulation of the REM sleep cycle and function as "REM-off" cells, with amphetamine's effect on norepinephrine and serotonin contributing to the suppression of REM sleep and a possible reduction of cataplexy at high doses.

The American Academy of Sleep Medicine (AASM) 2021 clinical practice guideline conditionally recommends dextroamphetamine for the treatment of both type 1 and type 2 narcolepsy. Treatment with pharmaceutical amphetamines is generally less preferred relative to other stimulants (e.g., modafinil) and is considered a third-line treatment option. Medical reviews indicate that amphetamine is safe and effective for the treatment of narcolepsy. Amphetamine appears to be most effective at improving symptoms associated with hypersomnolence, with three reviews finding clinically significant reductions in daytime sleepiness in patients with narcolepsy. Additionally, these reviews suggest that amphetamine may dose-dependently improve cataplexy symptoms. However, the quality of evidence for these findings is low and is consequently reflected in the AASM's conditional recommendation for dextroamphetamine as a treatment option for narcolepsy.

==== Available forms ====
Adderall is available as immediate-release (IR) tablets and extended-release (XR) capsules. Mydayis is available as an extended-release formulation. Adderall XR is approved to treat attention deficit hyperactivity disorder for up to 12 hours in individuals 6 years and older and uses a double-bead formulation. The capsule can be swallowed like a tablet, or it can be opened and the beads sprinkled over applesauce for comparable absorption. Upon ingestion, half of the beads provide immediate administration of medication, while the other half are enveloped in a coating that must dissolve, delaying absorption of its contents. It is designed to provide a therapeutic effect and plasma concentrations identical to taking two doses of Adderall IR four hours apart. Mydayis uses a longer-lasting triple-bead formulation and is approved to treat attention deficit hyperactivity disorder for up to 16 hours in individuals aged 13 years of age and older. In the United States, the immediate and extended-release formulations of Adderall are available as generic medications. Generic formulations of Mydayis became available in the US in October 2023.

=== Enhancing performance ===
==== Cognitive performance ====
In 2015, a systematic review and a meta-analysis of high quality clinical trials found that, when used at low (therapeutic) doses, amphetamine produces modest yet unambiguous improvements in cognition, including working memory, long-term episodic memory, inhibitory control, and some aspects of attention, in normal healthy adults; these cognition-enhancing effects of amphetamine are known to be partially mediated through the indirect activation of both dopamine D_{1} receptor and α_{2}-adrenergic receptor in the prefrontal cortex. A systematic review from 2014 found that low doses of amphetamine also improve memory consolidation, in turn leading to improved recall of information. Therapeutic doses of amphetamine also enhance cortical network efficiency, an effect which mediates improvements in working memory in all individuals. Amphetamine and other ADHD stimulants also improve task saliency (motivation to perform a task) and increase arousal (wakefulness), in turn promoting goal-directed behavior. Stimulants such as amphetamine can improve performance on difficult and boring tasks and are used by some students as a study and test-taking aid. Based upon studies of self-reported illicit stimulant use, 5–35% of college students use diverted ADHD stimulants, which are primarily used for enhancement of academic performance rather than as recreational drugs. However, high amphetamine doses that are above the therapeutic range can interfere with working memory and other aspects of cognitive control.

==== Physical performance ====
Amphetamine is used by some athletes for its psychological and athletic performance-enhancing effects, such as increased endurance and alertness; however, non-medical amphetamine use is prohibited at sporting events that are regulated by collegiate, national, and international anti-doping agencies. In healthy people at oral therapeutic doses, amphetamine has been shown to increase muscle strength, acceleration, athletic performance in anaerobic conditions, and endurance (i.e., it delays the onset of fatigue), while improving reaction time. Amphetamine improves endurance and reaction time primarily through reuptake inhibition and release of dopamine in the central nervous system. Amphetamine and other dopaminergic drugs also increase power output at fixed levels of perceived exertion by overriding a "safety switch", allowing the core temperature limit to increase in order to access a reserve capacity that is normally off-limits. At therapeutic doses, the adverse effects of amphetamine do not impede athletic performance; however, at much higher doses, amphetamine can induce effects that severely impair performance, such as rapid muscle breakdown and elevated body temperature.

Adderall is banned by the National Football League (NFL), Major League Baseball (MLB), the National Basketball Association (NBA), the National Collegiate Athletic Association (NCAA), and the National Hockey League (NHL). In leagues such as the National Football League, there is a very rigorous process required to obtain an exemption to this rule even when the athlete has been medically prescribed the drug by their physician.

=== Recreational ===
Adderall has a high potential for misuse as a recreational drug. Adderall tablets can either be swallowed, crushed and snorted, or dissolved in water and injected. Injection into the bloodstream can be dangerous because insoluble fillers within the tablets can block small blood vessels.

Many postsecondary students have reported using Adderall for study purposes in different parts of the developed world. Among these students, some of the risk factors for misusing ADHD stimulants recreationally include: Inadequate accommodation of disability, basing one's self-worth on external validation, low self-efficacy, earning poor grades, and having an untreated mental health disorder.

== Contraindications ==
According to the International Programme on Chemical Safety (IPCS) and the U.S. Food and Drug Administration (FDA), (Note: The statements supported by the USFDA come from prescribing information, which is the copyrighted intellectual property of the manufacturer and approved by the USFDA. USFDA contraindications are not necessarily intended to limit medical practice but limit claims by pharmaceutical companies.) amphetamine is contraindicated in people with a history of drug abuse, (Note: According to one review, amphetamine can be prescribed to individuals with a history of abuse provided that appropriate medication controls are employed, such as requiring daily pick-ups of the medication from the prescribing physician.) cardiovascular disease, severe agitation, or severe anxiety. It is also contraindicated in individuals with advanced arteriosclerosis (hardening of the arteries), glaucoma (increased eye pressure), hyperthyroidism (excessive production of thyroid hormone), or moderate to severe hypertension. These agencies indicate that people who have experienced allergic reactions to other stimulants or who are taking monoamine oxidase inhibitors (MAOIs) should not take amphetamine, although safe concurrent use of amphetamine and monoamine oxidase inhibitors has been documented. These agencies also state that anyone with anorexia nervosa, bipolar disorder, depression, hypertension, liver or kidney problems, mania, psychosis, Raynaud's phenomenon, seizures, thyroid problems, tics, or Tourette syndrome should monitor their symptoms while taking amphetamine. Evidence from human studies indicates that therapeutic amphetamine use does not cause developmental abnormalities in the fetus or newborns (i.e., it is not a human teratogen), but amphetamine abuse does pose risks to the fetus. Amphetamine has also been shown to pass into breast milk, so the IPCS and the FDA advise mothers to avoid breastfeeding when using it. Due to the potential for reversible growth impairments, (Note: In individuals who experience sub-normal height and weight gains, a rebound to normal levels is expected to occur if stimulant therapy is briefly interrupted. The average reduction in final adult height from 3 years of continuous stimulant therapy is 2 cm.) the FDA advises monitoring the height and weight of children and adolescents prescribed an amphetamine pharmaceutical.

== Adverse effects ==
The adverse side effects of Adderall are many and varied, but the amount of substance consumed is the primary factor in determining the likelihood and severity of side effects. Adderall is currently approved for long-term therapeutic use by the USFDA. Recreational use of Adderall generally involves far larger doses and is therefore significantly more dangerous, involving a much greater risk of serious adverse drug effects than dosages used for therapeutic purposes.

=== Physical ===
Cardiovascular side effects can include hypertension or hypotension from a vasovagal response, Raynaud's phenomenon (reduced blood flow to the hands and feet), and tachycardia (increased heart rate). Sexual side effects in males may include erectile dysfunction, frequent erections, or prolonged erections. Gastrointestinal side effects may include abdominal pain, constipation, diarrhea, and nausea. Other potential physical side effects include appetite loss, blurred vision, dry mouth, excessive grinding of the teeth, nosebleed, profuse sweating, rhinitis medicamentosa (drug-induced nasal congestion), reduced seizure threshold, tics (a type of movement disorder), and weight loss. Dangerous physical side effects are rare at typical pharmaceutical doses.

Amphetamine stimulates the medullary respiratory centers, producing faster and deeper breaths. In a normal person at therapeutic doses, this effect is usually not noticeable, but when respiration is already compromised, it may be evident. Amphetamine also induces contraction in the urinary bladder sphincter, the muscle which controls urination, which can result in difficulty urinating. This effect can be useful in treating bed wetting and loss of bladder control. The effects of amphetamine on the gastrointestinal tract are unpredictable. If intestinal activity is high, amphetamine may reduce gastrointestinal motility (the rate at which content moves through the digestive system); however, amphetamine may increase motility when the smooth muscle of the tract is relaxed. Amphetamine also has a slight analgesic effect and can enhance the pain relieving effects of opioids.

FDA-commissioned studies from 2011 indicate that in children, young adults, and adults there is no association between serious adverse cardiovascular events (sudden death, heart attack, and stroke) and the medical use of amphetamine or other ADHD stimulants. These findings were subsequently corroborated by a 2022 meta-analysis that sampled nearly four million participants, which found no association between therapeutic use of amphetamine and the development of cardiovascular disease in any age group. However, amphetamine pharmaceuticals are contraindicated in individuals with preexisting cardiovascular disease.

=== Psychological ===
At normal therapeutic doses, the most common psychological side effects of amphetamine include increased alertness, apprehension, concentration, initiative, self-confidence and sociability, mood swings (elated mood followed by mildly depressed mood), insomnia or wakefulness, and decreased sense of fatigue. Less common side effects include anxiety, change in libido, grandiosity, irritability, repetitive or obsessive behaviors, and restlessness; these effects depend on the user's personality and current mental state. Amphetamine psychosis (e.g., delusions and paranoia) can occur in heavy users. Although very rare, this psychosis can also occur at therapeutic doses during long-term therapy. According to the FDA, "there is no systematic evidence" that stimulants produce aggressive behavior or hostility.

Amphetamine has also been shown to produce a conditioned place preference in humans taking therapeutic doses, meaning that individuals acquire a preference for spending time in places where they have previously used amphetamine.

=== Reinforcement disorders ===
==== Addiction ====
Addiction and dependence glossary
- addiction – a neuropsychological disorder characterized by a persistent and intense urge to use a drug or engage in a behavior that produces natural reward; addictive drug – psychoactive substances that with repeated use are associated with significantly higher rates of substance use disorders, due in large part to the drug's effect on brain reward systems; dependence – an adaptive state associated with a withdrawal syndrome upon cessation of repeated exposure to a stimulus (e.g., drug intake); drug sensitization or reverse tolerance – the escalating effect of a drug resulting from repeated administration at a given dose; drug withdrawal – symptoms that occur upon cessation of repeated drug use; physical dependence – dependence that involves persistent physical–somatic withdrawal symptoms (e.g., delirium tremens and nausea); psychological dependence – dependence that is characterized by emotional-motivational withdrawal symptoms (e.g., anhedonia and anxiety) that affect cognitive functioning.; reinforcing stimuli – stimuli that increase the probability of repeating behaviors paired with them; rewarding stimuli – stimuli that the brain interprets as intrinsically positive and desirable or as something to approach; sensitization – an amplified response to a stimulus resulting from repeated exposure to it; substance use disorder – a condition in which the use of substances leads to clinically and functionally significant impairment or distress; drug tolerance – the diminishing effect of a drug resulting from repeated administration at a given dose

Transcription factor glossary
- gene expression – the process by which information from a gene is used in the synthesis of a functional gene product such as a protein; transcription – the process of making messenger RNA (mRNA) from a DNA template by RNA polymerase; transcription factor – a protein that binds to DNA and regulates gene expression by promoting or suppressing transcription; transcriptional regulation – controlling the rate of gene transcription for example by helping or hindering RNA polymerase binding to DNA; upregulation, activation, or promotion – increase the rate of gene transcription; downregulation, repression, or suppression – decrease the rate of gene transcription; coactivator – a protein (or a small molecule) that works with transcription factors to increase the rate of gene transcription; corepressor – a protein (or a small molecule) that works with transcription factors to decrease the rate of gene transcription; response element – a specific sequence of DNA that a transcription factor binds to

Signaling cascade in the nucleus accumbens that results in amphetamine addiction
This diagram depicts the signaling events in the brain's reward center that are induced by chronic high-dose exposure to psychostimulants that increase the concentration of synaptic dopamine, like amphetamine, methamphetamine, and phenethylamine. Following presynaptic dopamine and glutamate co-release by such psychostimulants, postsynaptic receptors for these neurotransmitters trigger internal signaling events through a cAMP-dependent pathway and a calcium-dependent pathway that ultimately result in increased CREB phosphorylation. Phosphorylated CREB increases levels of ΔFosB, which in turn represses the c-Fos gene with the help of corepressors; c-Fos repression acts as a molecular switch that enables the accumulation of ΔFosB in the neuron. A highly stable (phosphorylated) form of ΔFosB, one that persists in neurons for 1–2 months, slowly accumulates following repeated high-dose exposure to stimulants through this process. ΔFosB functions as "one of the master control proteins" that produces addiction-related structural changes in the brain, and upon sufficient accumulation, with the help of its downstream targets (e.g., nuclear factor kappa B), it induces an addictive state.

Addiction is a serious risk with heavy recreational amphetamine use, but is unlikely to occur from long-term medical use at therapeutic doses; in fact, lifetime stimulant therapy for ADHD that begins during childhood reduces the risk of developing substance use disorders as an adult. Pathological overactivation of the mesolimbic pathway, a dopamine pathway that connects the ventral tegmental area to the nucleus accumbens, plays a central role in amphetamine addiction. Individuals who frequently self-administer high doses of amphetamine have a high risk of developing an amphetamine addiction, since chronic use at high doses gradually increases the level of accumbal ΔFosB, a "molecular switch" and "master control protein" for addiction. Once nucleus accumbens ΔFosB is sufficiently overexpressed, it begins to increase the severity of addictive behavior (i.e., compulsive drug-seeking) with further increases in its expression. While there are currently no effective drugs for treating amphetamine addiction, regularly engaging in sustained aerobic exercise appears to reduce the risk of developing such an addiction. Exercise therapy improves clinical treatment outcomes and may be used as an adjunct therapy with behavioral therapies for addiction.

==== Biomolecular mechanisms ====
Chronic use of amphetamine at excessive doses causes alterations in gene expression in the mesocorticolimbic projection, which arise through transcriptional and epigenetic mechanisms. The most important transcription factors (Note: Transcription factors are proteins that increase or decrease the expression of specific genes.) that produce these alterations are Delta FBJ murine osteosarcoma viral oncogene homolog B (ΔFosB), cAMP response element binding protein (CREB), and nuclear factor-kappa B (NF-κB). ΔFosB is the most significant biomolecular mechanism in addiction because ΔFosB overexpression (i.e., an abnormally high level of gene expression which produces a pronounced gene-related phenotype) in the D1-type medium spiny neurons in the nucleus accumbens is necessary and sufficient (Note: In simpler terms, this necessary and sufficient relationship means that ΔFosB overexpression in the nucleus accumbens and addiction-related behavioral and neural adaptations always occur together and never occur alone.) for many of the neural adaptations and regulates multiple behavioral effects (e.g., reward sensitization and escalating drug self-administration) involved in addiction. Once ΔFosB is sufficiently overexpressed, it induces an addictive state that becomes increasingly more severe with further increases in ΔFosB expression. It has been implicated in addictions to alcohol, cannabinoids, cocaine, methylphenidate, nicotine, opioids, phencyclidine, propofol, and substituted amphetamines, among others.

ΔJunD, a transcription factor, and G9a, a histone methyltransferase enzyme, both oppose the function of ΔFosB and inhibit increases in its expression. Sufficiently overexpressing ΔJunD in the nucleus accumbens with viral vectors can completely block many of the neural and behavioral alterations seen in chronic drug abuse (i.e., the alterations mediated by ΔFosB). Similarly, accumbal G9a hyperexpression results in markedly increased histone 3 lysine residue 9 dimethylation (H3K9me2) and blocks the induction of ΔFosB-mediated neural and behavioral plasticity by chronic drug use, which occurs via H3K9me2-mediated repression of transcription factors for ΔFosB and H3K9me2-mediated repression of various ΔFosB transcriptional targets (e.g., CDK5). ΔFosB also plays an important role in regulating behavioral responses to natural rewards, such as palatable food, sex, and exercise. Since both natural rewards and addictive drugs induce the expression of ΔFosB (i.e., they cause the brain to produce more of it), chronic acquisition of these rewards can result in a similar pathological state of addiction. Consequently, ΔFosB is the most significant factor involved in both amphetamine addiction and amphetamine-induced sexual addictions, which are compulsive sexual behaviors that result from excessive sexual activity and amphetamine use. These sexual addictions are associated with a dopamine dysregulation syndrome which occurs in some patients taking dopaminergic drugs.

The effects of amphetamine on gene regulation are both dose- and route-dependent. Most of the research on gene regulation and addiction is based upon animal studies with intravenous amphetamine administration at very high doses. The few studies that have used equivalent (weight-adjusted) human therapeutic doses and oral administration show that these changes, if they occur, are relatively minor. This suggests that medical use of amphetamine does not significantly affect gene regulation.

===== Pharmacological treatments =====
As of December 2019, there is no effective pharmacotherapy for amphetamine addiction. Reviews from 2015 and 2016 indicated that TAAR1-selective agonists have significant therapeutic potential as a treatment for psychostimulant addictions; however, as of February 2016, the only compounds which are known to function as TAAR1-selective agonists are experimental drugs. Amphetamine addiction is largely mediated through increased activation of dopamine receptors and co-localized NMDA receptors (Note: NMDA receptors are voltage-dependent ligand-gated ion channels that requires simultaneous binding of glutamate and a co-agonist (D-serine or glycine) to open the ion channel.) in the nucleus accumbens; magnesium ions inhibit NMDA receptors by blocking the receptor calcium channel. One review suggested that, based upon animal testing, pathological (addiction-inducing) psychostimulant use significantly reduces the level of intracellular magnesium throughout the brain. Supplemental magnesium (Note: The review indicated that magnesium L-aspartate and magnesium chloride produce significant changes in addictive behavior; other forms of magnesium were not mentioned.) treatment has been shown to reduce amphetamine self-administration (i.e., doses given to oneself) in humans, but it is not an effective monotherapy for amphetamine addiction.

A systematic review and meta-analysis from 2019 assessed the efficacy of 17 different pharmacotherapies used in randomized controlled trials (RCTs) for amphetamine and methamphetamine addiction; it found only low-strength evidence that methylphenidate might reduce amphetamine or methamphetamine self-administration. There was low- to moderate-strength evidence of no benefit for most of the other medications used in RCTs, which included antidepressants (bupropion, mirtazapine, sertraline), antipsychotics (aripiprazole), anticonvulsants (topiramate, baclofen, gabapentin), naltrexone, varenicline, citicoline, ondansetron, prometa, riluzole, atomoxetine, dextroamphetamine, and modafinil.

===== Behavioral treatments =====
A 2018 systematic review and network meta-analysis of 50 trials involving 12 different psychosocial interventions for amphetamine, methamphetamine, or cocaine addiction found that combination therapy with both contingency management and community reinforcement approach had the highest efficacy (i.e., abstinence rate) and acceptability (i.e., lowest dropout rate). Other treatment modalities examined in the analysis included monotherapy with contingency management or community reinforcement approach, cognitive behavioral therapy, 12-step programs, non-contingent reward-based therapies, psychodynamic therapy, and other combination therapies involving these.

Additionally, research on the neurobiological effects of physical exercise suggests that daily aerobic exercise, especially endurance exercise (e.g., marathon running), prevents the development of drug addiction and is an effective adjunct therapy (i.e., a supplemental treatment) for amphetamine addiction. Exercise leads to better treatment outcomes when used as an adjunct treatment, particularly for psychostimulant addictions. In particular, aerobic exercise decreases psychostimulant self-administration, reduces the reinstatement (i.e., relapse) of drug-seeking, and induces increased dopamine receptor D_{2} (DRD2) density in the striatum. This is the opposite of pathological stimulant use, which induces decreased striatal DRD2 density. One review noted that exercise may also prevent the development of a drug addiction by altering ΔFosB or c-Fos immunoreactivity in the striatum or other parts of the reward system.

Summary of addiction-related plasticity
Form of neuroplasticity or behavioral plasticity	Type of reinforcer						Ref.
Form of neuroplasticity or behavioral plasticity	Opiates	Psychostimulants	High fat or sugar food	Sexual intercourse	Physical exercise (aerobic)	Environmental enrichment	Ref.
ΔFosB expression in nucleus accumbens D1-type MSNs	↑	↑	↑	↑	↑	↑	
Behavioral plasticity
Escalation of intake	Yes	Yes	Yes				
Psychostimulant cross-sensitization	Yes	Not applicable	Yes	Yes	Attenuated	Attenuated	
Psychostimulant self-administration	↑	↑	↓		↓	↓	
Psychostimulant conditioned place preference	↑	↑	↓	↑	↓	↑	
Reinstatement of drug-seeking behavior	↑	↑			↓	↓	
Neurochemical plasticity
CREB phosphorylation in the nucleus accumbens	↓	↓	↓		↓	↓	
Sensitized dopamine response in the nucleus accumbens	No	Yes	No	Yes			
Altered striatal dopamine signaling	↓DRD2, ↑DRD3	↑DRD1, ↓DRD2, ↑DRD3	↑DRD1, ↓DRD2, ↑DRD3		↑DRD2	↑DRD2	
Altered striatal opioid signaling	No change or ↑μ-opioid receptors	↑μ-opioid receptors ↑κ-opioid receptors	↑μ-opioid receptors	↑μ-opioid receptors	No change	No change	
Changes in striatal opioid peptides	↑dynorphin No change: enkephalin	↑dynorphin	↓enkephalin		↑dynorphin	↑dynorphin	
Mesocorticolimbic synaptic plasticity
Number of dendrites in the nucleus accumbens	↓	↑		↑			
Dendritic spine density in the nucleus accumbens	↓	↑		↑			

==== Dependence and withdrawal ====
Drug tolerance develops rapidly in amphetamine abuse (i.e., recreational amphetamine use), so periods of extended abuse require increasingly larger doses of the drug in order to achieve the same effect. According to a Cochrane review on withdrawal in individuals who compulsively use amphetamine and methamphetamine, "when chronic heavy users abruptly discontinue amphetamine use, many report a time-limited withdrawal syndrome that occurs within 24 hours of their last dose." This review noted that withdrawal symptoms in chronic, high-dose users are frequent, occurring in roughly 88% of cases, and persist for 3–4 weeks with a marked "crash" phase occurring during the first week. Amphetamine withdrawal symptoms can include anxiety, drug craving, depressed mood, fatigue, increased appetite, increased movement or decreased movement, lack of motivation, sleeplessness or sleepiness, and lucid dreams. The review indicated that the severity of withdrawal symptoms is positively correlated with the age of the individual and the extent of their dependence.

According to a 2025 review, the discontinuation of amphetamine at therapeutic doses does not typically result in withdrawal symptoms. Discontinuation of amphetamine may cause a recurrence of ADHD symptoms due to the cessation of treatment-related drug effects. In cases where mild withdrawal symptoms do occur, they can be avoided by tapering the dose. Unlike amphetamine abuse, where drug tolerance necessitates escalating doses to achieve the same effect, tolerance to clinically relevant doses of amphetamine plateaus after the initial titration period, and "drug holidays" (i.e., temporary treatment discontinuation) are not required to prevent the development of tolerance. A 2026 systematic review on ADHD medication tolerance found evidence of tolerance developing to some affective state effects of amphetamine (e.g., positive mood and drug liking) within two weeks of daily use, but little to no evidence of long-term tolerance to its therapeutic or cardiovascular effects.

== Overdose ==
An amphetamine overdose can lead to many different symptoms, but is rarely fatal with appropriate care. The severity of overdose symptoms increases with dosage and decreases with drug tolerance to amphetamine. Tolerant individuals have been known to take as much as 5 grams of amphetamine in a day, which is roughly 100 times the maximum daily therapeutic dose. Symptoms of a moderate and extremely large overdose are listed below; fatal amphetamine poisoning usually also involves convulsions and coma. In 2013, overdose on amphetamine, methamphetamine, and other compounds implicated in an "amphetamine use disorder" resulted in an estimated 3,788 deaths worldwide (3,425–4,145 deaths, 95% confidence). (Note: The 95% confidence interval indicates that there is a 95% probability that the true number of deaths lies between 3,425 and 4,145.)

Overdose symptoms by system
System	Minor or moderate overdose	Severe overdose
Cardiovascular	Abnormal heartbeat; High or low blood pressure	Cardiogenic shock (heart not pumping enough blood); Cerebral hemorrhage (bleeding in the brain); Circulatory collapse (partial or complete failure of the circulatory system)
Central nervous system	Confusion; Abnormally fast reflexes; Severe agitation; Tremor (involuntary muscle twitching)	Acute amphetamine psychosis (e.g., delusions and paranoia); Compulsive and repetitive movement; Serotonin syndrome (excessive serotonergic nerve activity); Sympathomimetic toxidrome (excessive adrenergic nerve activity)
Musculoskeletal	Muscle pain	Rhabdomyolysis (rapid muscle breakdown)
Respiratory	Rapid breathing	Pulmonary edema (fluid accumulation in the lungs); Pulmonary hypertension (high blood pressure in the arteries of the lung); Respiratory alkalosis (reduced blood CO_{2})
Urinary	Painful urination; Urinary retention (inability to urinate)	No urine production; Kidney failure
Other	Elevated body temperature; Mydriasis (dilated pupils)	Elevated or low blood potassium; Hyperpyrexia (extremely elevated core body temperature); Metabolic acidosis (excessively acidic bodily fluids)

== Interactions ==
- Monoamine oxidase inhibitors (MAOIs) taken with amphetamine may result in a hypertensive crisis if taken within two weeks after last use of an MAOI type drug.
- Inhibitors of enzymes that directly metabolize amphetamine (particularly CYP2D6 and FMO3) will prolong the elimination of amphetamine and increase drug effects.
- Serotonergic drugs (such as most antidepressants) co-administered with amphetamine increases the risk of serotonin syndrome.
- Stimulants and antidepressants (sedatives and depressants) may increase (decrease) the drug effects of amphetamine, and vice versa.
- Gastrointestinal and urinary pH affect the absorption and elimination of amphetamine, respectively. Gastrointestinal alkalinizing agents increase the absorption of amphetamine. Urinary alkalinizing agents increase the concentration of non-ionized species, decreasing urinary excretion.
- Proton-pump inhibitors (PPIs) modify the absorption of Adderall XR and Mydayis.
- Zinc supplementation may reduce the minimum effective dose of amphetamine when it is used for the treatment of ADHD. (Note: The human dopamine transporter contains a high affinity extracellular zinc binding site which, upon zinc binding, inhibits dopamine reuptake and amplifies amphetamine-induced dopamine efflux in vitro. The human serotonin transporter and norepinephrine transporter do not contain zinc binding sites.)
- Norepinephrine reuptake inhibitors (NRIs) like atomoxetine prevent norepinephrine release induced by amphetamines and have been found to reduce the stimulant, euphoriant, and sympathomimetic effects of dextroamphetamine in humans.

== Pharmacology ==
=== Mechanism of action ===
Monoamine release of amphetamine and related agents (EC_{50}, nM)
Compound	NE	DA	5-HT	Ref.
Phenethylamine	10.9	39.5	>10000	
Dextroamphetamine	6.6–7.2	5.8–24.8	698–1765	
Levoamphetamine	9.5	27.7	ND	
Dextromethamphetamine	12.3–13.8	8.5–24.5	736–1291.7	
Levomethamphetamine	28.5	416	4640	
Notes: The smaller the value, the more strongly the drug releases the neurotransmitter. See also Monoamine releasing agent § Activity profiles for a larger table with more compounds. Refs:

Pharmacodynamics of amphetamine in a dopamine neuron
Amphetamine enters the presynaptic neuron across the neuronal membrane or through DAT. Once inside, it binds to TAAR1 or enters synaptic vesicles through VMAT2. When amphetamine enters synaptic vesicles through VMAT2, it collapses the vesicular pH gradient, which in turn causes dopamine to be released into the cytosol (light tan-colored area) through VMAT2. When amphetamine binds to TAAR1, it reduces the firing rate of the dopamine neuron via G protein-coupled inwardly rectifying potassium channels (GIRKs) and activates protein kinase A (PKA) and protein kinase C (PKC), which subsequently phosphorylate DAT. PKA phosphorylation causes DAT to withdraw into the presynaptic neuron (internalize) and cease transport. PKC-phosphorylated DAT may either operate in reverse or, like PKA-phosphorylated DAT, internalize and cease transport. Amphetamine is also known to increase intracellular calcium, an effect which is associated with DAT phosphorylation through a CAMKIIα-dependent pathway, in turn producing dopamine efflux.

Amphetamine, the active ingredient of Adderall, works primarily by increasing the activity of the neurotransmitters dopamine and norepinephrine in the brain. It also triggers the release of several other hormones (e.g., epinephrine) and neurotransmitters (e.g., serotonin and histamine) as well as the synthesis of certain neuropeptides (e.g., cocaine and amphetamine regulated transcript (CART) peptides). Both active ingredients of Adderall, dextroamphetamine and levoamphetamine, bind to the same biological targets, but their binding affinities (that is, potency) differ somewhat. Dextroamphetamine and levoamphetamine are both potent full agonists (activating compounds) of trace amine-associated receptor 1 (TAAR1) and interact with vesicular monoamine transporter 2 (VMAT2), with dextroamphetamine being the more potent agonist of TAAR1. Consequently, dextroamphetamine produces more CNS stimulation than levoamphetamine; however, levoamphetamine has slightly greater cardiovascular and peripheral effects. It has been reported that certain children have a better clinical response to levoamphetamine.

In the absence of amphetamine, VMAT2 will normally move monoamines (e.g., dopamine, histamine, serotonin, norepinephrine, etc.) from the intracellular fluid of a monoamine neuron into its synaptic vesicles, which store neurotransmitters for later release (via exocytosis) into the synaptic cleft. When amphetamine enters a neuron and interacts with VMAT2, the transporter reverses its direction of transport, thereby releasing stored monoamines inside synaptic vesicles back into the neuron's intracellular fluid. Meanwhile, when amphetamine activates TAAR1, the receptor causes the neuron's cell membrane-bound monoamine transporters (i.e., the dopamine transporter, norepinephrine transporter, or serotonin transporter) to either stop transporting monoamines altogether (via transporter internalization) or transport monoamines out of the neuron; in other words, the reversed membrane transporter will push dopamine, norepinephrine, and serotonin out of the neuron's intracellular fluid and into the synaptic cleft. In summary, by interacting with both VMAT2 and TAAR1, amphetamine releases neurotransmitters from synaptic vesicles (the effect from VMAT2) into the intracellular fluid where they subsequently exit the neuron through the membrane-bound, reversed monoamine transporters (the effect from TAAR1).

=== Pharmacokinetics ===
The oral bioavailability of amphetamine varies with gastrointestinal pH; it is well absorbed from the gut, and bioavailability is typically 90%. Amphetamine is a weak base with a pK_{a} of 9.9; consequently, when the pH is basic, more of the drug is in its lipid soluble free base form, and more is absorbed through the lipid-rich cell membranes of the gut epithelium. Conversely, an acidic pH means the drug is predominantly in a water-soluble cationic (salt) form, and less is absorbed. Between 16-20% of amphetamine circulating in the bloodstream is bound to plasma proteins. Following absorption, amphetamine readily distributes into most tissues in the body, with high concentrations occurring in cerebrospinal fluid and brain tissue.

The half-lives of amphetamine enantiomers differ and vary with urine pH. At normal urine pH, the half-lives of dextroamphetamine and levoamphetamine are 9–11 hours and 11–14 hours, respectively. Highly acidic urine will reduce the enantiomer half-lives to 7 hours; highly alkaline urine will increase the half-lives up to 34 hours. The immediate-release and extended release variants of salts of both isomers reach peak plasma concentrations at 3 hours and 7 hours post-dose respectively. Amphetamine is eliminated via the kidneys, with 30–40% of the drug being excreted unchanged at normal urinary pH. When the urinary pH is basic, amphetamine is in its free base form, so less is excreted. When urine pH is abnormal, the urinary recovery of amphetamine may range from a low of 1% to a high of 75%, depending mostly upon whether urine is too basic or acidic, respectively. Following oral administration, amphetamine appears in urine within 3 hours. Roughly 90% of ingested amphetamine is eliminated 3 days after the last oral dose.

CYP2D6, dopamine β-hydroxylase (DBH), flavin-containing monooxygenase 3 (FMO3), butyrate-CoA ligase (XM-ligase), and glycine N-acyltransferase (GLYAT) are the enzymes known to metabolize amphetamine or its metabolites in humans. Amphetamine has a variety of excreted metabolic products, including 4-hydroxyamphetamine, 4-hydroxynorephedrine, 4-hydroxyphenylacetone, N-hydroxyamphetamine, benzoic acid, hippuric acid, norephedrine, and phenylacetone. Among these metabolites, the active sympathomimetics are 4-hydroxyamphetamine, 4-hydroxynorephedrine, norephedrine, and N-hydroxyamphetamine. The main metabolic pathways involve aromatic para-hydroxylation, aliphatic alpha- and beta-hydroxylation, N-oxidation, N-dealkylation, and deamination. The known metabolic pathways, detectable metabolites, and metabolizing enzymes in humans include the following:

Metabolic pathways of amphetamine in humans
The primary active metabolites of amphetamine are 4-hydroxyamphetamine and norephedrine; at normal urine pH, about 30–40% of amphetamine is excreted unchanged and roughly 50% is excreted as the inactive metabolites (bottom row). The remaining 10–20% is excreted as the active metabolites. Benzoic acid is metabolized by XM-ligase into an intermediate product, benzoyl-CoA, which is then metabolized by GLYAT into hippuric acid.

=== Pharmacomicrobiomics ===
The human metagenome (i.e., the genetic composition of an individual and all microorganisms that reside on or within the individual's body) varies considerably between individuals. Since the total number of microbial and viral cells in the human body (over 100 trillion) greatly outnumbers human cells (tens of trillions), (Note: There is substantial variation in microbiome composition and microbial concentrations by anatomical site. Fluid from the human colon – which contains the highest concentration of microbes of any anatomical site – contains approximately one trillion (10^12) bacterial cells/ml.) there is considerable potential for interactions between drugs and an individual's microbiome, including: drugs altering the composition of the human microbiome, drug metabolism by microbial enzymes modifying the drug's pharmacokinetic profile, and microbial drug metabolism affecting a drug's clinical efficacy and toxicity profile. The field that studies these interactions is known as pharmacomicrobiomics.

Similar to most biomolecules and other orally administered xenobiotics (i.e., drugs), amphetamine is predicted to undergo promiscuous metabolism by human gastrointestinal microbiota (primarily bacteria) prior to absorption into the blood stream. The first amphetamine-metabolizing microbial enzyme, tyramine oxidase from a strain of E. coli commonly found in the human gut, was identified in 2019. This enzyme was found to metabolize amphetamine, tyramine, and phenethylamine with roughly the same binding affinity for all three compounds.

=== Related endogenous compounds ===
Amphetamine has a very similar structure and function to the endogenous trace amines, which are naturally occurring neuromodulator molecules produced in the human body and brain. Among this group, the most closely related compounds are phenethylamine, the parent compound of amphetamine, and N-methylphenethylamine, a structural isomer of amphetamine (i.e., it has an identical molecular formula). In humans, phenethylamine is produced directly from L-phenylalanine by the aromatic amino acid decarboxylase (AADC) enzyme, which converts L-DOPA into dopamine as well. In turn, N-methylphenethylamine is metabolized from phenethylamine by phenylethanolamine N-methyltransferase, the same enzyme that metabolizes norepinephrine into epinephrine. Like amphetamine, both phenethylamine and N-methylphenethylamine regulate monoamine neurotransmission via TAAR1; unlike amphetamine, both of these substances are broken down by monoamine oxidase B, and therefore have a shorter half-life than amphetamine.

== History ==
The pharmaceutical company Rexar reformulated its weight loss drug Obetrol following its mandatory withdrawal from the market in 1973, under the Kefauver Harris Amendment to the Federal Food, Drug, and Cosmetic Act due to the results of the Drug Efficacy Study Implementation (DESI) program (which indicated a lack of efficacy). The new formulation simply replaced the two methamphetamine components with dextroamphetamine and amphetamine components of the same weight (the other two original dextroamphetamine and amphetamine components were preserved), preserved the Obetrol branding, and despite it lacking FDA approval, it still made it onto the market and was marketed and sold by Rexar for many years.

In 1994, Richwood Pharmaceuticals acquired Rexar and began promoting Obetrol as a treatment for ADHD (and later narcolepsy as well), now marketed under the brand name of Adderall, a contraction of the phrase "A.D.D. for All" intended to convey that "it was meant to be kind of an inclusive thing" for marketing purposes. The FDA cited the company for numerous significant CGMP violations related to Obetrol discovered during routine inspections following the acquisition (including issuing a formal warning letter for the violations), then later issued a second formal warning letter to Richwood Pharmaceuticals specifically due to violations of "the new drug and misbranding provisions of the FD&C Act". Following extended discussions with Richwood Pharmaceuticals regarding the resolution of a large number of issues related to the company's numerous violations of FDA regulations, the FDA formally approved the first Obetrol labeling/sNDA revisions in 1996, including a name change to Adderall and a restoration of its status as an approved drug product. In 1997 Richwood Pharmaceuticals was acquired by Shire Pharmaceuticals in a $186 million transaction.

Richwood Pharmaceuticals, which later merged with Shire, introduced the Adderall brand in 1996 as an instant-release tablet. In 2006, Shire agreed to sell rights to the Adderall name for the instant-release form of the medication to Duramed Pharmaceuticals. DuraMed Pharmaceuticals was acquired by Teva Pharmaceuticals in 2008 during their acquisition of Barr Pharmaceuticals, including Barr's Duramed division.

The first generic version of Adderall IR was introduced to the market in 2002. Later on, Barr and Shire reached a settlement agreement permitting Barr to offer a generic form of the extended-release drug beginning in April 2009.

=== Commercial formulation ===
Chemically, Adderall is a mixture of four amphetamine salts; specifically, it is composed of equal parts (by mass) of amphetamine aspartate monohydrate, amphetamine sulfate, dextroamphetamine sulfate, and dextroamphetamine saccharate. This drug mixture has slightly stronger CNS effects than racemic amphetamine due to the higher proportion of dextroamphetamine. Adderall is produced as both an immediate-release (IR) and extended-release (XR) formulation. As of December 2013, ten different companies produced generic Adderall IR, while Teva Pharmaceutical Industries, Actavis, and Barr Pharmaceuticals manufactured generic Adderall XR. As of 2013, Shire plc, the company that held the original patent for Adderall and Adderall XR, still manufactured brand name Adderall XR, but not Adderall IR.

=== Comparison to other formulations ===
Adderall is one of several formulations of pharmaceutical amphetamine, including singular or mixed enantiomers and as an enantiomer prodrug. The table below compares these medications (based on US-approved forms):

Amphetamine base in marketed amphetamine medications
drug		formula	molar mass (Note: For uniformity, molar masses were calculated using the Lenntech Molecular Weight Calculator and were within 0.01 g/mol of published pharmaceutical values.)		amphetamine base (Note: Amphetamine base percentage = molecular mass_{base} / molecular mass_{total}. Amphetamine base percentage for Adderall = sum of component percentages / 4.)			amphetamine base in equal doses		doses with equal base content (Note: dose = (1 / amphetamine base percentage) × scaling factor = (molecular mass_{total} / molecular mass_{base}) × scaling factor. The values in this column were scaled to a 30 mg dose of dextroamphetamine sulfate. Due to pharmacological differences between these medications (e.g., differences in the release, absorption, conversion, concentration, differing effects of enantiomers, half-life, etc.), the listed values should not be considered equipotent doses.)
drug		formula	(g/mol)		(percent)			(30 mg dose)		doses with equal base content
drug		formula	total	base	total	dextro-	levo-	dextro-	levo-	doses with equal base content
dextroamphetamine sulfate		(C_{9}H_{13}N)_{2}•H_{2}SO_{4}	368.49	270.41	73.38%	73.38%	—	22.0 mg	—	30.0 mg
amphetamine sulfate		(C_{9}H_{13}N)_{2}•H_{2}SO_{4}	368.49	270.41	73.38%	36.69%	36.69%	11.0 mg	11.0 mg	30.0 mg
Adderall					62.57%	47.49%	15.08%	14.2 mg	4.5 mg	35.2 mg
25%	dextroamphetamine sulfate	(C_{9}H_{13}N)_{2}•H_{2}SO_{4}	368.49	270.41	73.38%	73.38%	—			
25%	amphetamine sulfate	(C_{9}H_{13}N)_{2}•H_{2}SO_{4}	368.49	270.41	73.38%	36.69%	36.69%			
25%	dextroamphetamine saccharate	(C_{9}H_{13}N)_{2}•C_{6}H_{10}O_{8}	480.55	270.41	56.27%	56.27%	—			
25%	amphetamine aspartate monohydrate	(C_{9}H_{13}N)•C_{4}H_{7}NO_{4}•H_{2}O	286.32	135.21	47.22%	23.61%	23.61%			
lisdexamfetamine dimesylate		C_{15}H_{25}N_{3}O•(CH_{4}O_{3}S)_{2}	455.49	135.21	29.68%	29.68%	—	8.9 mg	—	74.2 mg
amphetamine base suspension		C_{9}H_{13}N	135.21	135.21	100%	76.19%	23.81%	22.9 mg	7.1 mg	22.0 mg

== Society and culture ==
=== Legal status ===
- In Canada, amphetamines are in Schedule I of the Controlled Drugs and Substances Act, and can only be obtained by prescription.
- In Japan, the use, production, and import of any medicine containing amphetamines is prohibited.
- In South Korea, amphetamines are prohibited.
- In Taiwan, amphetamines including Adderall are Schedule 2 drugs with a minimum five-year prison term for possession. On the contrary, Ritalin can be legally prescribed as a form of treatment of ADHD.
- In Thailand, amphetamines are classified as Type 1 Narcotics.
- In the United Kingdom, amphetamines are regarded as Class B drugs. The maximum penalty for unauthorized possession is five years in prison and an unlimited fine. The maximum penalty for illegal supply is 14 years in prison and an unlimited fine.
- In the United States, amphetamine is a Schedule II prescription drug, classified as a central nervous system (CNS) stimulant.
- Internationally, amphetamine is in Schedule II of the Convention on Psychotropic Substances.

=== Names ===
A similar combination is also sold under the brand name Mydayis. Mydayis contains the amphetamines dextroamphetamine sulfate, dextroamphetamine saccharate, amphetamine aspartate monohydrate, and amphetamine sulfate capsule.

=== Shortages ===
In February 2023, news organizations began reporting on shortages of Adderall in the United States that had lasted for over five months. The US Food and Drug Administration (FDA) first reported the shortage in October 2022. In May 2023, seven months into the shortage, the FDA commissioner stated that "a number of generic drugs are in shortage at any given time because there's not enough profit". He points out that Adderall is a special case because it is a controlled substance and the amount available for prescription is controlled by the Drug Enforcement Administration. He also faults a "tremendous increase in prescribing" due to virtual prescribing and general overprescribing and overdiagnosing, adding that "if only the people that needed these drugs got them, there probably wouldn't be a [stimulant medication] shortage". The shortage has continued into 2025. It has led to the creation and expansion of businesses that outsource the search for Adderall. One company charges $50 per U.S. customer to hire workers in the Philippines or another country to make phone calls to all the pharmacies located near the customer and check whether they have any Adderall.

== Notes ==
Image legend
