= Addictive behavior =

Rewarding and reinforcing behaviours

Addiction and dependence glossary
- addiction – a neuropsychological disorder characterized by a persistent and intense urge to use a drug or engage in a behavior that produces natural reward; addictive drug – psychoactive substances that with repeated use are associated with significantly higher rates of substance use disorders, due in large part to the drug's effect on brain reward systems; dependence – an adaptive state associated with a withdrawal syndrome upon cessation of repeated exposure to a stimulus (e.g., drug intake); drug sensitization or reverse tolerance – the escalating effect of a drug resulting from repeated administration at a given dose; drug withdrawal – symptoms that occur upon cessation of repeated drug use; physical dependence – dependence that involves persistent physical–somatic withdrawal symptoms (e.g., delirium tremens and nausea); psychological dependence – dependence that is characterised by emotional-motivational withdrawal symptoms (e.g., anhedonia and anxiety) that affect cognitive functioning.; reinforcing stimuli – stimuli that increase the probability of repeating behaviors paired with them; rewarding stimuli – stimuli that the brain interprets as intrinsically positive and desirable or as something to approach; sensitization – an amplified response to a stimulus resulting from repeated exposure to it; substance use disorder – a condition in which the use of substances leads to clinically and functionally significant impairment or distress; drug tolerance – the diminishing effect of a drug resulting from repeated administration at a given dose

An addictive behavior is a behavior, or a stimulus related to a behavior (e.g., sex or food), that is both rewarding and reinforcing, and is associated with the development of an addiction. There are two main forms of addiction: substance use disorders (including alcohol, tobacco, and cannabis) and behavioral addiction (including sex, gambling, eating, and shoplifting). The parallels and distinctions between behavioral addictions and other compulsive behavior disorders like bulimia nervosa and obsessive-compulsive disorder (OCD) are still being researched by behavioral scientists.

Defining addictive behavior presents a challenge, as the concept encompasses diverse behaviors, and therefore its usage has been contentious. Although, central to the definition is excessive dependence on a specific substance or activity, derived from the Latin term 'to enslave.' Furthermore, addictive behavior describes patterns characterized by a loss of control and a compulsion to accept a reward despite severe consequences. This often manifests in compulsive engagement, prioritizing short-term gratification over long-term consequences, and a transition from impulsivity to compulsivity. Consequently, addictive behaviors create a spectrum of activities that entrap individuals in repetitive patterns, despite the adverse consequences, echoing the enslavement inherent in the notion of addiction.

Developments in research continue to reshape the human's understanding of addiction. Traditionally, addiction was largely associated with substance-use disorders, including alcohol and heroin, and therefore "non-substance-related (behavioral) addiction" was not listed in the two internationally used diagnostic manuals for mental disorders. However, contemporary research suggests that any stimulus capable of producing pleasure can lead to addiction. This shift broadens the scope of addiction to include excessive shopping, internet usage, computer gaming, gambling, and sex. Addictive behaviors, whether substance-related or behavioral, often involve deficiencies in inhibitory control, emotion regulation, and decision-making. There are significant overlaps in diagnostic symptoms between substance use and behavioral addiction, including dominance over one's life, euphoric experiences, withdrawal symptoms, interpersonal conflicts, and the risk of relapse despite negative outcomes.

From a neurobiological perspective, behavioral addiction may affect brain neurotransmitter systems similarly to pharmacological substances, such as the dopamine system. These behaviors often follow a three-step cycle consisting of preoccupation (anticipation), binge intoxication, and withdrawal effect, with reinforcement playing a central role in each stage. Reinforcement occurs through positive experiences during the initial engagement, negative reinforcement to alleviate withdrawal symptoms, and conditioned reinforcement where cues associated with behavior or drugs trigger intense cravings, perpetuating the addiction.

Addiction is classified as a chronic brain disorder by the American Society of Addiction Medicine (ASAM). There are several reasons why people develop an addiction. A predisposition to the addictive qualities of substances may be inherited by some people, making it a genetic circumstance. Another cause for addictions could be the environment. Whether or not someone develops substance use problems can be influenced by their home and neighborhood, as well as the attitudes of their peers, family, and culture on substance use. Another cause of developing an addiction could be related to mental health issues: over 50% of individuals with substance use disorders have experienced mental health issues at some point in their lives. Even moderate substance usage might exacerbate mental health issues in individuals. The other view is from the moral standpoint which regards addictive behavior as an intentional choice was freely made by the addict.

== How addiction affects the brain ==
Brain imaging techniques have assisted in mapping neural circuits involved in addictive behaviors, such as reward responses, cravings, cue conditioning, and withdrawal symptoms. This has provided key insights on the underlying mechanisms of addiction, including substance use and non-substance (behavioral) addictions.

Addiction hijacks the brain's reward system, which normally encourages individuals to engage in survival-related activities such as socializing, eating, or achieving goals. Substances or specific behavioral activities create an intense "high" by flooding the reward system with dopamine, a chemical commonly known as "a feel-good chemical". Over time, the brain adapts to this surge by dampening its dopamine production and sensitivity to rewards. Consequently, the addicted individual may experience feelings of sluggishness and lack of motivation unless they consume the substance or engage in an activity to attain a sense of normalcy. This cycle of intense pleasure is followed by withdrawal symptoms and cravings, which fuel addiction.

Despite the traditional distinction between substance-use addictions and behavioral addictions, research reveals noteworthy similarities in their neurochemical mechanisms. Brain imaging studies demonstrates that both types of addiction activate similar regions in the mesolimbic reward pathway, a network linked to motivation and pleasure. Moreover, both involve changes in neurotransmitters, such as dopamine and serotonin, which are responsible for regulating mood, impulse control and reward processing. These convergent neurochemical features suggest that substance dependence and non-substance addictions follow similar fundamental stages.

The key stages of addiction are as follows:

Intoxication: Addictive substances induce dopamine surges in the mesolimbic reward system during intoxication, reinforcing a pleasurable high and establishing associations between drug-related cues and the anticipation of rewards

Adaptation: Individuals with addiction exhibit reduced dopamine production, leading to diminished sensitivity with repeated use. Besides dopamine, other neurotransmitters, such as serotonin and opioids, contribute to initial pleasurable effects (euphoria) and are also impacted by the brain's adaptation to repeated use.

Withdrawal: Upon cessation of the behavior or the drug effect wearing off, individuals experience negative mood states, including anxiety and anhedonia, due to the dampened reward system. Withdrawal processes are mediated by basal forebrain areas and neurotransmitters such as corticotropin-releasing factor (CRF) and norepinephrine.

Cravings: Conditioned cues (sight, smell, and emotions) drive cravings, prompting individuals to seek a re-experience of euphoria. Prefrontal circuits involved in highlighting the substance or addictive behavior's importance are activated, while the limbic region triggers an automatic response encouraging the pursuit of the activity or substance. Dusyfuntioning in prefrontal cortical regions impairs executive functions, making it difficult to resist craving despite adverse consequences.

These overlapping neurochemical features support the growing understanding of addiction as a border phenomenon, impacting substance-use and behavioral addictions.

== Compulsion vs addiction ==
Compulsions are the basis of addictions. Reward is one major distinction between compulsion in addicts and compulsion as it is experienced in obsessive-compulsive disorder. An addiction is, by definition, a form of compulsion, and involves operant reinforcement. For example, dopamine is released in the brain's reward system and is a motive for behaviour (i.e. the compulsions in addiction development through positive reinforcement).

There are two main differences between compulsion and addiction. Compulsion is the need and desire to do something or carry out a task repetitively or persistently. Whereas addiction is defined by the following step after compulsion where an individual takes action on a compulsion to feel pleasure and satisfaction (the action is known as compulsive behavior). Notably, for addicts, compulsive behavior can lead to "persistent changes in the brain structures and functions" which creates a cycle of motivation for their behavior that is absent in OCD.

Compulsions (and compulsive behavior) do not necessarily include pleasure for the individual but addictive behavior does. In contrast, someone who experiences a compulsion as part of obsessive-compulsive disorder may not perceive anything rewarding from acting on the compulsion. Often, it is a way of dealing with the obsessive part of the disorder, resulting in a feeling of relief (i.e., compulsions may also arise through negative reinforcement).

== Correlation between different personality traits and addictive behaviors online ==
For over a decade, scientists have emphasized that contact with digital technology can potentially lead to addiction. People of all ages utilize digital devices, and their numbers are growing annually. Accordingly, excessive internet use can result in unhealthy internet use, also known as internet addiction.

It's been proven that the big five personality traits and internet addiction are associated. A recent study aimed to examine the relationships between the big five personality traits and internet addiction within this framework. As such, the researchers employed the meta-analysis method. In accordance with the study's goal, twelve papers were included in the meta-analysis, and thirteen effect sizes were derived from these investigations. In this case, it was shown that agreeableness, conscientiousness, extraversion, and openness to new experiences were inversely correlated with internet addiction, while neuroticism was positively correlated with it. As a result, it's thought that the big five personality traits play a significant role in the development of an internet addiction.

Another study focuses on neuroticism, which has been frequently proven to be a risk factor for internet addiction. The following categories were used to summarize the concepts related to neuroticism and internet addiction: internalizing problems, externalizing problems, coping style, and other factors. The most significant finding from the study is that, with rare exceptions, internet addiction has been primarily included as an outcome and all other ideas as predictors. Internalizing problems comprise the most consistent subset of the topics in the study. In addition to having a positive correlation, neuroticism and internalizing problems were independent predictors of internet, smartphone, and social media addiction. Regarding externalizing problems—which were often the subject of less research—the same picture became apparent. The review's findings also demonstrated that, similar to neurotic people's difficulties with emotion regulation, the internet provides them with a special setting in which to deal with unpleasant emotions. Furthermore, having poor-quality social relationships increases the risk of developing internet addiction and other digital addictions, particularly in those with high levels of neuroticism.

== Development of addictive behaviors in adolescents ==
Given the similarities between substance use addictions and behavioral addictions, the risk factors for susceptibility appear similar, with age of onset (adolescence) being a key factor. Adolescence is a period of time characterized by significant changes of physical, cognitive and emotional nature. Adolescents are discovering their individuality and struggle to balance their independence with peer conformity. During this transitional period, adolescents are therefore vulnerable to developing addictive behaviors.

Epidemiological studies reveal that recreational users differentiate from those with substance use disorders. Research suggests a correlation between individuals who initiate substance use during adolescence and developing a substance use addiction, progressing rapidly from trial to the adverse consequences of addiction. Substance usage increases in late adolescence and young adulthood, with alcohol, marijuana, and tobacco being the most widely consumed substances.

Brain maturation during adolescence is more susceptible to developing addictive behaviors as it further promotes risk-taking behaviors and subsequently early addiction decisions. This has been corroborated by animal studies, revealing that biological factors may desensitize adolescents to the sedative effects of chemical substances, such as alcohol, leading to increased consumption during the teenage years, In fact, drug or alcohol-induced addictive behaviors in adolescents have been linked to models discussing a stronger sensitization of the appetitive response and disrupted inhibitory control. Moreover, the susceptibility of adolescents is heightened as they tend to weigh the rewarding effects of the activity or stimulus more heavily than the negative effects, while also being less sensitive to withdrawal effects. In early adolescence, individuals lack the motivation to control appetitive motivational tendencies. The presence of positive and negative reinforcers seem to increase alcohol consumption, portraying a positive correlation between motives and alcohol consumption. After initiating drinking, there seems to be an increase in appetitive motivation to drink and a negative effect on controlled regulatory processes. The imbalance between these factors lead to increased substance use. Although there have been declines in adolescent substance use rates, trends of rising e-cigarette (vape) usage highlight the ongoing health care concern regarding adolescent substance use and its effects on neurodevelopment processes during this crucial developmental stage.

In addition to the environmental influences, there seems to be a genetic role in adolescent addictive behaviors. Addiction risk alleles can increase the risk of addictive behaviors in teens. Furthermore, the prefrontal cortex, the region responsible for decision making and executive function, is still developing during adolescence. This creates a vulnerability and the initiation of addictive behavior during this developmental stage can thus affect long-term functioning.

== Therapy for addictions ==
Therapy for addictions is not a cure, but a way of managing addictive behaviors. It is a treatment tailored to the specific triggers and root causes affecting each patient (such as trauma, stress, or anxiety), and that "enables people to counteract addiction's disruptive effects on their brain and behavior and regain control of their lives."

Various therapeutic approaches exist to assist individuals in modifying addictive behaviors (i.e.: such as yoga therapy, which can "treat or prevent addiction"). However, individuals seeking therapy for addictive behaviors may benefit significantly from consulting with a therapist recognized by medical institutions for their expertise in addiction or compulsion.

While medical interventions may be necessary for physical detoxification in certain cases, "addiction therapy or addiction counseling is focused on treating psychological addiction". For instance, individuals may engage in addictive behaviors to cope with "historical trauma", necessitating a therapist to use trauma focused cognitive behavioral therapy or exposure therapy to address past issues. Alternatively, for those using addictive behaviors to cope with current events, therapy addiction may focus on "learning stress management techniques and emotional regulation skills", including cognitive behavioral therapy or acceptance and commitment therapy. In other cases, when addiction is intertwined with mental health issues, therapists employ an integrated approach, addressing conditions (i.e.: depression, anxiety, or bipolar disorder) alongside the addiction through procedures such as dialectical behavior therapy or hypnotherapy.

The use of these treatments is increasing in the medical field, as "a shift is occurring to mainstream the delivery of early intervention and treatment services into general health care practice".

== See also ==
- Addiction
- ANNK1 and addictive behaviors
- Addiction vulnerability
- Behavioral addiction
- Habituation
- Substance dependence
