= IPCS Health and Safety Guide =

The IPCS Health and Safety Guides are monographs prepared by the International Programme on Chemical Safety (IPCS) and published by the World Health Organization (WHO). They aim to provide "concise information in non-technical language, for decision-makers on risks from exposure to chemicals, with practical advice on medical and administrative issues." Just over 100 HSGs have been published.

An HSG usually accompanies an Environmental Health Criteria (EHC) monograph. The two documents cover similar material, but the HSG is much shorter and unreferenced (citations to the original sources can be found in the corresponding EHC).
