= EHC =

EHC may refer to:

- Eastern Harbour Crossing, a transport tunnel in Hong Kong
- EHC Hoensbroek, a Dutch football club
- The Electric Hellfire Club, an American industrial metal band
- Encompass Health, an American healthcare provider
- Environmental Health Criteria (WHO)
- Everybody Hates Chris, a television sitcom which ran from 2005 to 2009.
