= Environmental Health Criteria (WHO) =

Environmental Health Criteria (EHC) is a series of monographs prepared by the International Programme on Chemical Safety (IPCS) and published by the World Health Organization (WHO). They aim to give "comprehensive data from scientific sources for the establishment of safety standards and regulations." More than 230 EHCs have been published.

Many EHCs cover the properties of individual chemicals or of groups of related chemicals (see, e.g., EHC 65: Butanols). Since 1998, this role has mostly been taken over by the related Concise International Chemical Assessment Documents (CICADs), also prepared by the IPCS and published by the WHO. EHCs can also cover non-chemical (potential) hazards (see, e.g., EHC 35: Extremely low frequency (ELF) fields) and methodology (see, e.g., EHC 144: Aged Population, principles for evaluating the effects of chemicals).

EHCs are based on a search of the scientific literature, and do not include new experimentation (unlike, e.g., SIDS or EU-RARs) although they may contain recommendations for further studies. A typical monograph on a chemical substance would include:

- the physical and chemical properties of the substance and analytical methods for determining concentrations and exposure;
- sources of environmental and industrial exposure and environmental transport;
- chemobiokinetics and metabolism including absorption, distribution, transformation and elimination;
- short- and long-term effects on animals, including carcinogenicity, mutagenicity, and teratogenicity;
- an evaluation of risks for human health and of the effects on the environment.

Monographs do not contain specific guidelines for regulations (although they might contain examples of national exposure limits, for example), and they do not constitute an official position of the WHO or of any of the other organizations participating in the IPCS.
