= Screening information dataset =

Hazard study of chemical substances

A screening information dataset (SIDS) is a study of the hazards associated with a particular chemical substance or group of related substances, prepared under the auspices of the Organisation for Economic Co-operation and Development (OECD). The substances studied are high production volume (HPV) chemicals, which are manufactured or imported in quantities of more than 1000 tonnes per year for any single OECD market.

The list of HPV chemicals is prepared by the OECD Secretariat and updated regularly. As of 2004, 4,843 chemicals were on the list. Of these, roughly 1000 have been prioritised for special attention, and SIDS are prepared for these chemicals, usually by an official agency in one of the OECD member countries with the collaboration of the UN International Programme on Chemical Safety (IPCS).

The procedures for investigating the risks of an HPV chemical are described in the OECD Manual for Investigation of HPV Chemicals. The initial stage is the collection of existing information (either published or supplied by manufacturers) on the chemical. If the existing information is insufficient to make an assessment of the risks, the chemical may be tested at this stage to collect more data. The initial report of the investigation is discussed at a SIDS initial assessment meeting (SIAM), which includes:

- representatives of OECD member countries
- experts nominated by the IPCS, the OECD Business and Industry Advisory Committee, Trade Union Advisory Committee, and environmental organizations
- representatives of companies which produce the chemical
- secretariat staff from OECD, IPCS, and UNEP chemicals

The SIAM can either accept the draft report or call for revisions (including further testing). Once the comments and discussion of the SIAM have been taken into account, the report is published by the United Nations Environment Programme (UNEP).

The possibility of new testing to complete the study is what distinguishes SIDS reports from similar studies such as Concise International Chemical Assessment Documents (CICADs). In this sense, SIDS are similar to European Union Risk Assessment Reports (RARs). The distinction is that the SIDS programme is specifically aimed at HPV chemicals, while the chemicals selected for EU RARs are chosen more on the basis of a hazard profile, so include chemicals with much lower production volumes.
