= Caffeine withdrawal =

Withdrawal symptoms of caffeine

- Molecular structure of caffeine
- Specialty: Psychiatry
- Symptoms: Headache, fatigue or drowsiness, depression, irritability, difficulty concentrating, nausea or vomiting
- Usual onset: 12–48 hours after the last use
- Duration: Up to 7 days

Caffeine withdrawal is a set of symptoms, behaviors, and physiological changes that can occur when an individual significantly reduces or stops consuming caffeine. This condition typically arises in individuals who have regularly consumed caffeine over an extended period or in substantial amounts. Common sources of caffeine include coffee, tea, energy drinks, and certain over-the-counter medications.

== Signs and symptoms ==
Caffeine withdrawal can present with a variety of symptoms, which may range from mild to severe. Common symptoms include:

- Headache
- Irritability
- Depressed or low mood
- Fatigue or drowsiness
- Nausea or vomiting
- Difficulty concentrating

In some cases, withdrawal symptoms can cause significant distress or impair daily activities. While rare, extreme cases may be temporarily incapacitating.

== Causes ==
Prolonged caffeine use leads to physical dependence. When caffeine intake is suddenly reduced or halted, the body may respond with withdrawal symptoms. For habitual users, caffeine's reinforcing effects are often linked to its ability to suppress mild withdrawal symptoms that emerge after short periods without caffeine, such as overnight abstinence. This cyclical pattern may contribute to ongoing caffeine consumption.

== Diagnosis ==
Caffeine withdrawal is recognised as a clinical diagnosis in major diagnostic manuals, including the DSM-5-TR, ICD-10, and ICD-11. Diagnosis is based on the presence of characteristic symptoms following a reduction in caffeine intake.

=== Differential diagnosis ===
The symptoms of caffeine withdrawal can resemble those of other medical and neurological conditions. Common conditions that may be mistaken for caffeine withdrawal include migraine and other headache disorders, tension, viral infections, sinus conditions, medication side effects, and other drug withdrawal syndromes.

=== Comorbidity ===
Caffeine withdrawal is sometimes associated with other mental disorders. Conditions that may co-occur with caffeine withdrawal include generalized anxiety disorder, antisocial personality disorder, major depressive disorder, panic disorder, alcohol use disorder (moderate to severe), and cocaine and cannabis use.

== Treatment ==
Headaches from caffeine withdrawal may respond to common pain relievers such as aspirin or other analgesics. If withdrawal occurs as part of a planned reduction in caffeine intake, gradually tapering consumption is generally recommended to minimize symptom severity.

== Sources ==
- Juliano, Laura M.; Griffiths, Roland R. (2004). "A critical review of caffeine withdrawal: empirical validation of symptoms and signs, incidence, severity, and associated features". Psychopharmacology. 176 (1): 1–29. doi:10.1007/s00213-004-2000-x. ISSN 0033-3158.
- Heatherley, Susan V. (2011). "Caffeine withdrawal, sleepiness, and driving performance: What does the research really tell us?". Nutritional Neuroscience. 14 (3): 89–95. doi:10.1179/147683011X13019262348785. ISSN 1028-415X.
- Satel, Sally (2006-01-01). "Is Caffeine Addictive?—A Review of the Literature". The American Journal of Drug and Alcohol Abuse. 32 (4): 493–502. doi:10.1080/00952990600918965. ISSN 0095-2990.
