= High production volume chemicals =

High production volume chemicals (HPV chemicals) are produced or imported into the United States in quantities of 1 million pounds or 500 tons per year. In OECD countries, HPV chemicals are defined as being produced at levels greater than 1,000 metric tons per producer/importer per year in at least one member country/region. A list of HPV chemicals serves as an overall priority list, from which chemicals are selected to gather data for a screening information dataset (SIDS), for testing and for initial hazard assessment.

== History ==
=== OECD countries including EU ===
In 1987, member countries of the Organisation for Economic Co-operation and Development decided to investigate existing chemicals. In 1991, they agreed to begin by focusing on High production volume (HPV) chemicals, where production volume was used as a surrogate for data on occupational, consumer, and environmental exposure. Each country agreed to "sponsor" the assessment of a proportion of the HPV chemicals. Countries also agreed on a minimum set of required information, the screening information dataset (SIDS). Six tests are: acute toxicity, chronic toxicity, developmental toxicity/reproductive toxicity, mutagenicity, ecotoxicity and environmental fate. Using SIDS and detailed exposure data OECD's High Production Volume Chemicals Programme conducted initial risk assessments to screen and to identify any need for further work.

During the late 1990s, OECD member countries began to assess chemical categories and to use quantitative structure–activity relationship (QSAR) results to create OECD guidance documents, as well as a computerized QSAR toolbox. In 1998, the global chemical industry, organized in the International Council of Chemical Associations (ICCA) initiative, offered to join OECD efforts. The ICCA promised to sponsor by 2013 about 1,000 substances from the OECD's HPV chemicals list "to establish as priorities for investigation", based on "presumed wide dispersive use, production in two or more global regions or similarity to another chemical, which met either of these criteria". OECD in turn agreed to refocus and to "increase transparency, efficiency and productivity and allow longer-term planning for governments and industry". The OECD refocus was on initial hazard assessments of HPV chemicals only, and no longer extensive exposure information gathering and evaluation. Detailed exposure assessments within national (or regional) programmes and priority setting activities were postponed as post-SIDS work.

=== United States ===
On October 9, 1998, EPA Administrator Carol Browner sent letters to the CEOs of more than 900 chemical companies that manufacture HPV chemicals, asking them to participate in EPA's voluntary testing initiative, the so-called "HPV Challenge Program". The Environmental Defense Fund, the American Petroleum Institute, and American Chemistry Council joined in the effort.

== HPV chemical lists ==
The OECD list of HPV chemicals keeps changing. A 2004 list of 143 pages contained 4,842 entries. A 2007 list was published in 2009.

As of 2009 the EPA's HPV list had 2,539 chemicals, while the HPV Challenge Program chemical list contained only 1,973 chemicals because inorganic chemicals and polymers were not included.

The EPA has published an online list of HPV chemicals since 2010. The list is not enumerated and without footnotes.

== Regulatory context ==
=== Europe ===
The "Strategic Approach to International Chemicals Management" (SAICM) is a policy for achieving safe production and use of chemicals worldwide by 2020, developed with stakeholders from more than 140 countries, signed by 100 governments, adopted by the UNEP Governing Council in February 2006. The Registration, Evaluation, Authorisation and Restriction of Chemicals (REACH) proposal and the European Chemicals Agency will help the EU to fulfill objectives of SAICM.

The Stockholm Convention on Persistent Organic Pollutants has aimed to control production, use, trade, disposal and release of twelve Persistent organic pollutants (POPs); the European Community has proposed five additional chemicals. The Convention bans deliberate production and use of POPs, bans the development of new POPs, and aims at minimizing releases of unintentionally produced POPs. The convention has so far been ratified by the European Community, 18 member states and the two accession countries.

=== United States ===
The 1976 Toxic Substances Control Act requires the EPA to "compile, keep current, and publish a list of each chemical substance that is manufactured or processed in the United States". In 1998, the EPA reported the most heavily used HPV chemicals in commerce were largely untested: 43% of 2,800 HPV chemicals had no basic toxicity data or screening level data at all, 50% had incomplete screening data, and only 7% of the HPV chemicals had a complete set of screening level toxicity data. However, screening level data, even if they indicated a problem, were not sufficient to restrict the use of a compound. In 1986, 2003, 2005, and 2011 EPA issued regulations to amend and update the TSCA inventory.

As of April 2010, about 84,000 chemicals were on the TSCA inventory, per a GAO report. TSCA Section 4 gives EPA the authority to demand chemical testing.

== Toxicity data ==
In 1982, U.S. manufacturers, processors, and importers of 75 chemicals that the International Agency for Research on Cancer had found to cause cancers in animals, but the carcinogenicity of which in humans was uncertain, were surveyed. Only for 13 of the 75 chemicals had epidemiologic studies on human health been completed or were in progress. Eighteen of the 75 were HPV chemicals and only for eight HPV chemicals had epidemiologic studies been completed or were in progress. The largest number of chemicals (19) were drugs, and none of them had been epidemiologically studied. Seven chemicals that had been studied were used as pesticides.

In 1997 the Environmental Defense Fund reported in “Toxic Ignorance” results of its analysis of the availability of basic health test data on HPV chemicals that only 29% of the HPV chemicals in the US met minimum data requirements. In 1998 the EPA published a report CHEMICAL HAZARD DATA AVAILABILITY STUDY showing "55% of TRI chemicals have had full SIDS testing, while only 7% of other chemicals have full test data". They wrote "...of the 830 companies making HPV chemicals in the US, 148 companies have NO SIDS data available on their chemicals; an additional 459 companies sell products for which, on average, half or less of SIDS tests are available. Only 21 companies (or 3% of the 830 companies) have all SIDS tests available for their chemicals. The basic set of test data costs about $200,000 per chemical." In 1999, the European Union (EU) published a study about how many EU-HPV chemicals were publicly available in a comprehensive chemical data base called IUCLID: Only 14% of the EU-HPV chemicals had data at the level of the base-set, 65% had less than base-set, and 21% had no data available. The authors concluded, "more data [were] publicly available than most previous studies" had shown.

In 2004, one of the partners in EPA's HPV Challenge Program assessed 532 up to then unsponsored chemicals, whether they were "orphaned" or not, and found:

- 156 chemicals (29%) likely were still "orphans" – i.e., they could and should be sponsored, but had not been
- 103 chemicals (19%) had an unclear status
- 266 chemicals (50%) were likely no longer HPV
- only 7 chemicals (1%) appeared to be in the process of becoming sponsored.

Since 2009, the EPA required companies to perform toxicity testing on merely 34 chemicals. In 2011, the EPA announced, but as of 2013 had yet to finalize, plans to require testing for 23 additional chemicals, so altogether 57 chemicals. The EPA has prioritized 83 chemicals for risk assessment, and initiated seven assessments in 2012, with plans to start 18 additional assessments in 2013 and 2014. In 2007, EPA began Toxcast which uses "automated chemical screening technologies (called "high-throughput screening assays") to expose living cells or isolated proteins to chemicals".

In 2009, EPA reported that it developed a system called ACToR (Aggregated Computational Toxicology Resource) to expose living cells or isolated proteins to chemicals. It pooled chemical research, data and screening tools from multiple federal agencies including the National Toxicology Program/ National Institute of Environmental Health Science, National Center for Advancing Translational Sciences and the Food and Drug Administration.

== See also ==
- Chemical compound
- Risk assessment
- TSCA
