= Reverse tolerance =

Pharmacological phenomenon

Addiction and dependence glossary
- addiction – a neuropsychological disorder characterized by a persistent and intense urge to use a drug or engage in a behavior that produces natural reward; addictive drug – psychoactive substances that with repeated use are associated with significantly higher rates of substance use disorders, due in large part to the drug's effect on brain reward systems; dependence – an adaptive state associated with a withdrawal syndrome upon cessation of repeated exposure to a stimulus (e.g., drug intake); drug sensitization or reverse tolerance – the escalating effect of a drug resulting from repeated administration at a given dose; drug withdrawal – symptoms that occur upon cessation of repeated drug use; physical dependence – dependence that involves persistent physical–somatic withdrawal symptoms (e.g., delirium tremens and nausea); psychological dependence – dependence that is characterized by emotional-motivational withdrawal symptoms (e.g., anhedonia and anxiety) that affect cognitive functioning.; reinforcing stimuli – stimuli that increase the probability of repeating behaviors paired with them; rewarding stimuli – stimuli that the brain interprets as intrinsically positive and desirable or as something to approach; sensitization – an amplified response to a stimulus resulting from repeated exposure to it; substance use disorder – a condition in which the use of substances leads to clinically and functionally significant impairment or distress; drug tolerance – the diminishing effect of a drug resulting from repeated administration at a given dose

Reverse tolerance or drug sensitization is a pharmacological phenomenon describing subjects' increased reaction (positive or negative) to a drug following its repeated use. Not all drugs are subject to reverse tolerance.

This is the opposite of drug tolerance, in which the effect or the subject's reaction decreases following its repeated use. The two notions are not incompatible, and tolerance may sometimes lead to reverse tolerance. For example, heavy drinkers initially develop tolerance to alcohol, requiring them to drink larger amounts to achieve a similar effect, but as excessive drinking can cause liver damage, this can then put this group at risk of intoxication when drinking even very small amounts of alcohol. Sensitization, a form of reverse tolerance, develops rapidly to the positive, euphoric effects of alcohol, but not to the physical effects, such as sedation and respiratory depression, which diminish with prolonged use. This sensitization does not occur, however, with administration of benzodiazepines or neuroactive steroids, which only exhibit weakening of effect with repeated use.

Reverse tolerance can also occur in users of stimulants such as cocaine or amphetamines. A previously recreational dose may become enough to cause psychosis in regular users, or users who previously had a psychotic episode may be more likely to have one in the future and at lower doses once drug usage continues.

In some cases drug sensitization may also refer to medical interventions (e.g. a drug holiday) that aim to reduce the insensitivity caused by drug tolerance.

== See also ==
- Desensitization (medicine)
- Downregulation and upregulation
- Kindling (sedative–hypnotic withdrawal)
