= Drug holiday =

Planned period of time when taking a medication is paused

A drug holiday (sometimes also called a drug vacation, medication vacation, structured treatment interruption, tolerance break, treatment break, t-break, or strategic treatment interruption) is when a patient stops taking a medication(s) for a period of time; anywhere from a few days to many months or even years if the doctor or medical provider feels it is best for the patient. It is recommended not to discontinue any medication without the close supervision of the prescribing party as it is only for specific cases.

Planned drug holidays are used in some fields of medicine. They are perhaps best known in HIV therapy, after a study suggested that stopping medication may stimulate the immune system to attack the virus. As of 2025, there is a scientific consensus against drug holiday for HIV. Another reason for drug holidays is to permit a drug to regain effectiveness after a period of continuous use, and to reduce the tolerance effect that may require increased dosages.

In addition to drug holidays that are intended for therapeutic effect, they are sometimes used to reduce drug side effects so that patients may enjoy a more normal life for a period of time such as a weekend or holiday, or engage in a particular activity. For example, it is common for patients using SSRI anti-depressant therapies to take a drug holiday to reduce or avoid side effects associated with sexual dysfunction.

In the treatment of mental illness, a drug holiday may be part of a progression toward treatment cessation. The holiday is also a tool to assess a drug's benefits against unwanted side effects, assuming that both will dissipate after an extended vacation.

== Evolution of the practice ==
=== As a treatment for bipolar disorder ===
One-day drug holidays in the lithium treatment of bipolar disorder, known as "lithium-free days", have been in use since the pioneering work of Noack and Trautner in 1951. This was found to reduce toxic buildup of the drug in some patients.

=== As a treatment for Parkinson's disease ===
Drug holidays from L-dopa found use in the early 1970s when Sweet et al. reported they were beneficial in terms of restoring the effectiveness of the treatment after adaptation by the brain had diminished its effectiveness. However, later studies revealed that such drug holidays conferred only temporary benefits to L-dopa responsiveness. Furthermore, there was an increased risk of death from associated complications, namely aspiration pneumonia, depression, and thromboembolic disease. L-dopa drug holidays are thus no longer recommended.

=== As a treatment for schizophrenia ===
Drug holidays from antipsychotic medication such as chlorpromazine have been used since the early 1980s to alleviate adverse reactions associated with long-term treatment.

According to Ann Mortimer, it is acknowledged that established guidelines require long-term treatment in established schizophrenia, because the vast majority of evidence from discontinuation, "drug holiday", and ultra-low-dose studies conducted over many years points to significantly higher relapse rates when compared to maintenance treatment. If antipsychotics cannot be avoided in the near term, there is no reason to question their long-term usefulness. The same might be said of insulin in diabetes.

=== As a treatment for HIV ===
HIV selectively targets activated helper T-cells. Thus, over time, HIV will tend to selectively destroy those helper T-cells most capable of fighting the HIV infection off, effectively desensitizing the immune system to the infection. The purpose of a structured treatment interruption is to create a short interval in which the virus becomes common enough to stimulate reproduction of T-cells capable of fighting the virus.

A 2006 HIV literature review noted that "two studies suggested that so-called drug holidays were of no benefit and might actually harm patients, while a third study suggested that the idea might still have value and should be revisited." As of 2025, there is a scientific consensus against drug holiday for HIV.

== See also ==
- Downregulation and upregulation
- Rebound effect
- Tachyphylaxis
