= Concise International Chemical Assessment Document =

Documents describing the toxicological properties of chemical compounds

Concise International Chemical Assessment Documents (CICADs) are published by the World Health Organization within the framework of the International Programme on Chemical Safety (IPCS). They describe the toxicological properties of chemical compounds.

CICADs are prepared in draft form by one or two experts from national bodies such as the US Centers for Disease Control and Prevention, and then peer reviewed by an international group of experts. They do not constitute the official policy of any of the bodies which contribute to their publication.
