= Drug withdrawal =

Medical condition caused by drug dependence

- Specialty: Psychiatry

Drug withdrawal, drug withdrawal syndrome, or substance withdrawal syndrome is the group of symptoms that occur upon the abrupt discontinuation or decrease in the intake of pharmaceutical or recreational drugs.

In order for the symptoms of withdrawal to occur, one must have first developed a form of drug dependence. This may occur as physical dependence, psychological dependence, or both. Drug dependence develops from consuming one or more substances over a period of time.

Dependence arises in a dose-dependent manner and produces withdrawal symptoms that vary with the type of drug that is consumed. For example, prolonged use of an antidepressant medication is likely to cause a rather different reaction when discontinued compared to discontinuation of an opioid, such as heroin. Withdrawal symptoms from opioids include joint, bone and muscle pain, anxiety, cold sweats, increased heart rate and blood pressure, dilated pupils, vomiting, and diarrhea. Alcohol withdrawal symptoms include irritability, fatigue, shaking, sweating, and nausea. Withdrawal from nicotine can cause irritability, fatigue, insomnia, headache, and difficulty concentrating. Many prescription and legal non-prescription substances can also cause withdrawal symptoms when individuals stop consuming them, even if they were taken as directed by a physician.

The route of administration, whether intravenous, intramuscular, oral, or otherwise, can also play a role in determining the severity of withdrawal symptoms. There are different stages of withdrawal as well; generally, a person will start to feel bad (crash or comedown), progress to feeling worse, hit a plateau, and then the symptoms begin to dissipate. However, withdrawal from certain drugs (e.g., barbiturates, benzodiazepines, alcohol, glucocorticoids) can be fatal. While it is seldom fatal to the user, withdrawal from opioids (and some other drugs) can cause cardiac arrest in some cases, and miscarriages due to fetal withdrawal. The term "cold turkey" is used to describe the sudden cessation of use of a substance and the ensuing physiologic manifestations.

The symptoms from withdrawal may be even more dramatic when the drug has masked prolonged malnutrition, disease, chronic pain, infections (common in intravenous drug use), or sleep deprivation, conditions that drug abusers often develop as a secondary consequence of the drug. When the drug is removed, these conditions may resurface and be confused with withdrawal symptoms. Genes that encode for the alpha-5 nicotinic acetylcholine receptor affect nicotine and alcohol withdrawal symptoms.

== Effect on homeostasis ==
Homeostasis is the body's ability to maintain a certain chemical equilibrium in the brain and throughout the body. For example, the function of shivering in response to cold is to produce heat maintaining internal temperature at around 37 °C (98.6 °F). Homeostasis is impacted in many ways by drug usage and withdrawal. The internal systems perpetuate homeostasis by using different counter-regulatory methods in order to create a new state of balance based on the presence of the drug in the system. These methods include adapting the body's levels of neurotransmitters, hormones, and other substances present to adjust for the addition of the drug to the body.

== Substances ==
Addiction and dependence glossary
- addiction – a neuropsychological disorder characterized by a persistent and intense urge to use a drug or engage in a behavior that produces natural reward; addictive drug – psychoactive substances that with repeated use are associated with significantly higher rates of substance use disorders, due in large part to the drug's effect on brain reward systems; dependence – an adaptive state associated with a withdrawal syndrome upon cessation of repeated exposure to a stimulus (e.g., drug intake); drug sensitization or reverse tolerance – the escalating effect of a drug resulting from repeated administration at a given dose; drug withdrawal – symptoms that occur upon cessation of repeated drug use; physical dependence – dependence that involves persistent physical–somatic withdrawal symptoms (e.g., delirium tremens and nausea); psychological dependence – dependence that is characterized by emotional-motivational withdrawal symptoms (e.g., anhedonia and anxiety) that affect cognitive functioning.; reinforcing stimuli – stimuli that increase the probability of repeating behaviors paired with them; rewarding stimuli – stimuli that the brain interprets as intrinsically positive and desirable or as something to approach; sensitization – an amplified response to a stimulus resulting from repeated exposure to it; substance use disorder – a condition in which the use of substances leads to clinically and functionally significant impairment or distress; drug tolerance – the diminishing effect of a drug resulting from repeated administration at a given dose

Examples (and ICD-10 code) of withdrawal syndrome include:

- F10.3 alcohol withdrawal syndrome (which can lead to delirium tremens)
- F11.3 opioid withdrawal
- F12.3 cannabis withdrawal
- F13.3 benzodiazepine withdrawal
- F14.3 cocaine withdrawal
- F15.3 caffeine withdrawal
- F17.3 nicotine withdrawal

== Prescription medicine ==
As noted above, many drugs should not be stopped abruptly without the advice and supervision of a physician, especially if the medication induces dependence or if the condition they are being used to treat is potentially dangerous and likely to return once medication is stopped, such as diabetes, asthma, heart conditions, and many psychological or neurological conditions, like epilepsy, depression, hypertension, schizophrenia, and psychosis. The stopping of antipsychotics in schizophrenia and psychoses needs monitoring. The stopping of antidepressants for example, can lead to antidepressant discontinuation syndrome. With careful physician attention, however, medication prioritization and discontinuation can decrease costs, simplify prescription regimens, decrease risks of adverse drug events and poly-pharmacy, focus therapies where they are most effective, and prevent cost-related under-use of medications.

Medication Appropriateness Tool for Comorbid Health Conditions in Dementia (MATCH-D) warns that people with dementia are more likely to experience adverse effects, and to monitor carefully for withdrawal symptoms when ceasing medications for these people as they are both more likely to experience symptoms and less likely to be able to reliably report symptoms.

=== Antihypertensive drugs ===
The latest evidence does not have evidence of an effect due to discontinuing vs continuing medications used for treating elevated blood pressure or prevention of heart disease in older adults on all-case mortality and incidence of heart attack. The findings are based on low quality evidence suggesting it may be safe to stop antihypertensive medications. However, older adults should not stop any of their medications without talking to a healthcare professional.

== See also ==
- Drug detoxification
- Hangover
- List of investigational substance-related disorder drugs
- Neonatal withdrawal
- Post-acute withdrawal syndrome (PAWS)
- Rebound effect
