= Psychological dependence =

Form of behavioral dependence involving emotional symptoms

Addiction and dependence glossary
- addiction – a neuropsychological disorder characterized by a persistent and intense urge to use a drug or engage in a behavior that produces natural reward; addictive drug – psychoactive substances that with repeated use are associated with significantly higher rates of substance use disorders, due in large part to the drug's effect on brain reward systems; dependence – an adaptive state associated with a withdrawal syndrome upon cessation of repeated exposure to a stimulus (e.g., drug intake); drug sensitization or reverse tolerance – the escalating effect of a drug resulting from repeated administration at a given dose; drug withdrawal – symptoms that occur upon cessation of repeated drug use; physical dependence – dependence that involves persistent physical–somatic withdrawal symptoms (e.g., delirium tremens and nausea); psychological dependence – dependence that is characterised by emotional-motivational withdrawal symptoms (e.g., anhedonia and anxiety) that affect cognitive functioning.; reinforcing stimuli – stimuli that increase the probability of repeating behaviors paired with them; rewarding stimuli – stimuli that the brain interprets as intrinsically positive and desirable or as something to approach; sensitization – an amplified response to a stimulus resulting from repeated exposure to it; substance use disorder – a condition in which the use of substances leads to clinically and functionally significant impairment or distress; drug tolerance – the diminishing effect of a drug resulting from repeated administration at a given dose

Psychological dependence is a cognitive disorder and a form of dependence that is characterized by emotional–motivational withdrawal symptoms upon cessation of prolonged drug use or certain repetitive behaviors. Consistent and frequent exposure to particular substances or behaviors is responsible for inducing psychological dependence, requiring ongoing engagement to prevent the onset of an unpleasant withdrawal syndrome driven by negative reinforcement. Neuronal counter-adaptation is believed to contribute to the generation of withdrawal symptoms through changes in neurotransmitter activity or altered receptor expression. Environmental enrichment and physical activity have been shown to attenuate withdrawal symptoms.

== Symptoms ==
Psychological withdrawal symptoms include:

- Anhedonia
- Anxiety
- Changes in appetite
- Craving for responsible stimulus
- Dysphoria
- Exhaustion
- Insomnia / Hypersomnia
- Irritability
- Panic attack
- Stress

== Development ==
Psychological dependence develops through consistent and frequent exposure to a stimulus. After sufficient exposure to a stimulus capable of inducing psychological dependence (e.g., drug use), an adaptive state develops that results in the onset of withdrawal symptoms that negatively affect psychological function upon cessation of exposure.

While psychological dependence is commonly associated with prolonged drug use, it can also manifest through certain behaviors. Psychostimulants (e.g., amphetamine) are a class of drugs that induce only psychological withdrawal symptoms in dependent users. Behaviors such as excessive exercise can lead to exercise dependence in both amateur and professional athletes, where cognitive withdrawal symptoms—such as anxiety and irritability—arise during periods of abstinence and often correlate with the duration of abstinence. Other behaviors that can produce observable psychological withdrawal symptoms (i.e., cause psychological dependence) include shopping, sex and self-stimulation using pornography, and eating food with high sugar or fat content, among others.

The process responsible for the induction of psychological dependence is a negative feedback mechanism that involves neuronal-counter adaptation, leading to tolerance to the desirable effects of certain drugs or stimuli and a subsequent withdrawal syndrome upon abrupt cessation of exposure. While psychological dependence and addiction are distinct disease states mediated by opposite modes of reinforcement, they arise through partially overlapping biological processes. In the nucleus accumbens, both conditions involve overlapping signaling cascades that diverge at the CREB transcription factor. Upregulation of CREB expression in the nucleus accumbens plays a major role in mediating psychological dependence by inhibiting reward-related motivational salience, which mediates the onset of emotional-motivational withdrawal symptoms. Evidence indicates that the unpleasant nature of these withdrawal symptoms intensifies the desire to resume the associated drug or behavior.

=== Biomolecular mechanisms ===
Two factors have been identified as playing pivotal roles in psychological dependence: the neuropeptide "corticotropin-releasing factor" (CRF) and the gene transcription factor "cAMP response element binding protein" (CREB). The nucleus accumbens (NAcc) is one brain structure that has been implicated in the psychological component of drug dependence. In the NAcc, CREB is activated by cyclic adenosine monophosphate (cAMP) immediately after a high and triggers changes in gene expression that affect proteins such as dynorphin; dynorphin peptides reduce dopamine release into the NAcc by temporarily inhibiting the reward pathway. A sustained activation of CREB thus forces a larger dose to be taken to reach the same effect. In addition, it leaves the user feeling generally depressed and dissatisfied, and unable to find pleasure in previously enjoyable activities, often leading to a return to the drug for another dose.

In addition to CREB, it is hypothesized that stress mechanisms play a role in dependence. Koob and Kreek have hypothesized that during drug use, CRF activates the hypothalamic–pituitary–adrenal axis (HPA axis) and other stress systems in the extended amygdala. This activation influences the dysregulated emotional state associated with psychological dependence. They found that as drug use escalates, so does the presence of CRF in human cerebrospinal fluid. In rat models, the separate use of CRF inhibitors and CRF receptor antagonists both decreased self-administration of the drug of study. Other studies in this review showed dysregulation of other neuropeptides that affect the HPA axis, including enkephalin which is an endogenous opioid peptide that regulates pain. It also appears that μ-opioid receptors, which enkephalin acts upon, is influential in the reward system and can regulate the expression of stress hormones.

Increased expression of AMPA receptors in nucleus accumbens MSNs is a potential mechanism of aversion produced by drug withdrawal.

== Methods for reducing dependence ==
A study examined how rats experienced morphine withdrawal in different surroundings. The rats were either placed in a standard environment (SE) or in an enriched environment (EE). The study concluded that EE reduced depression and anxiety withdrawal symptoms.

Another study tested whether swimming exercises affected the intensity of perceivable psychological symptoms in rodents during morphine withdrawal. It concluded that the anxious and depressive states of the withdrawal were reduced in rats from the exercise group.

== Distinction between psychological and physical dependence ==
Table 1: Drugs and Their Associated Dependence Syndrome (Note: Substances listed under the physical dependence column are also capable of inducing psychological dependence. Conversely, substances listed under the psychological dependence column do not induce physical dependence.)
| Physical dependence | Psychological dependence |
|---|---|
| Alcohols | Hallucinogens |
| Barbiturates | Inhalants |
| Benzodiazepines | Psychostimulants |
| Cannabis products | |
| Opioids | |

The defining contrast between psychological dependence and physical dependence syndromes lies in the nature of the withdrawal symptoms experienced from removal of a particular stimulus following the development of tolerance. Psychological dependence is characterized by symptoms that are cognitive in nature and may include anxiety, dysphoria, exhaustion, hyperphagia, or irritability, among other symptoms. Conversely, physical dependence involves entirely somatic symptoms, such as diarrhea, myalgia, nausea, sweating, tremors, and other symptoms that are readily observable. Substance dependence is a general term that can refer to either psychological or physical dependence, or both, depending on the specific substance involved.

== See also ==
- Compulsion loop
- Emotional security
- Habituation
- Substance dependence
- Substance use disorder
