= Drug tolerance =

Reduced reaction to a drug following repeated use

Addiction and dependence glossary
- addiction – a neuropsychological disorder characterized by a persistent and intense urge to use a drug or engage in a behavior that produces natural reward; addictive drug – psychoactive substances that with repeated use are associated with significantly higher rates of substance use disorders, due in large part to the drug's effect on brain reward systems; dependence – an adaptive state associated with a withdrawal syndrome upon cessation of repeated exposure to a stimulus (e.g., drug intake); drug sensitization or reverse tolerance – the escalating effect of a drug resulting from repeated administration at a given dose; drug withdrawal – symptoms that occur upon cessation of repeated drug use; physical dependence – dependence that involves persistent physical–somatic withdrawal symptoms (e.g., delirium tremens and nausea); psychological dependence – dependence that is characterised by emotional-motivational withdrawal symptoms (e.g., anhedonia and anxiety) that affect cognitive functioning.; reinforcing stimuli – stimuli that increase the probability of repeating behaviors paired with them; rewarding stimuli – stimuli that the brain interprets as intrinsically positive and desirable or as something to approach; sensitization – an amplified response to a stimulus resulting from repeated exposure to it; substance use disorder – a condition in which the use of substances leads to clinically and functionally significant impairment or distress; drug tolerance – the diminishing effect of a drug resulting from repeated administration at a given dose

Drug tolerance or drug insensitivity is a pharmacological concept describing subjects' reduced reaction to a drug following its repeated use. Drug tolerance develops gradually over time. Increasing its dosage may re-amplify the drug's effects; however, this may accelerate tolerance, further reducing the drug's effects. Drug tolerance is indicative of drug use but is not necessarily associated with drug dependence or addiction. The process of tolerance development is reversible (e.g., through a drug holiday) and can involve both physiological factors and psychological factors. Tolerance can occur with drugs taken for pharmaceutical or recreational purposes.

One may also develop drug tolerance to side effects, in which case tolerance is a desirable characteristic. A medical intervention that has an objective to increase tolerance (e.g., allergen immunotherapy, in which one is exposed to larger and larger amounts of allergen to decrease one's allergic reactions) is called drug desensitization.

The opposite concept to drug tolerance is reverse tolerance, in which case the subject's reaction or effect will increase following its repeated use. The two notions are not incompatible and tolerance may sometimes lead to reverse tolerance. For example, heavy drinkers initially develop tolerance to alcohol (requiring them to drink larger amounts to achieve a similar effect) but excessive drinking can cause liver damage, which then puts them at risk of intoxication when drinking even very small amounts of alcohol.

Drug tolerance should not be confused with drug tolerability, which refers to the degree to which overt adverse effects of a drug can be tolerated by a patient.

== Tachyphylaxis ==
Tachyphylaxis is a subcategory of drug tolerance referring to cases of sudden, short-term onset of tolerance following the administration of a drug. This is commonly seen with drugs that act on the nervous and immune systems. The exact mechanism of tachyphylaxis vary depending on the drug, and they may include receptor desensitization, depletion of neurotransmitters or mediators and physiological adaptation.

== Pharmacodynamic tolerance ==
Pharmacodynamic tolerance begins when the cellular response to a substance is reduced with repeated use. A common cause of pharmacodynamic tolerance is high concentrations of a substance constantly binding with the receptor, desensitizing it through constant interaction. Other possibilities include a reduction in receptor density (usually associated with receptor agonists), other mechanisms leading to changes in action potential firing rate, or alterations in protein transcription among others adaptations. Pharmacodynamic tolerance to a receptor antagonist involves the reverse, i.e., increased receptor firing rate, an increase in receptor density, or other mechanisms.

While most occurrences of pharmacodynamic tolerance occur after sustained exposure to a drug, instances of acute or instant tolerance (tachyphylaxis) can occur.

== Pharmacokinetic (metabolic) tolerance ==
Pharmacokinetics refers to the absorption, distribution, metabolism, and excretion of drugs (ADME). All psychoactive drugs are first absorbed into the bloodstream, carried in the blood to various parts of the body including the site of action (distribution), broken down in some fashion (metabolism), and ultimately removed from the body (excretion). All of these factors are very important determinants of crucial pharmacological properties of a drug, including its potency, side effects, and duration of action.

Pharmacokinetic tolerance (dispositional tolerance) occurs because of a decreased quantity of the substance reaching the site it affects. This may be caused by an increase in induction of the enzymes required for degradation of the drug e.g. CYP450 enzymes. This is most commonly seen with substances such as ethanol.

This type of tolerance is most evident with oral ingestion, because other routes of drug administration bypass first-pass metabolism. Enzyme induction is partly responsible for the phenomenon of tolerance, in which repeated use of a drug leads to a reduction of the drug's effect. However, it is only one of several mechanisms leading to tolerance.

== Behavioral tolerance ==
Behavioral tolerance occurs with the use of certain psychoactive drugs, where tolerance to a behavioral effect of a drug, such as increased motor activity by methamphetamine, occurs with repeated use. It may occur through drug-independent learning or as a form of pharmacodynamic tolerance in the brain; the former mechanism of behavioral tolerance occurs when one learns how to actively overcome drug-induced impairment through practice. Behavioral tolerance is often context-dependent, meaning tolerance depends on the environment in which the drug is administered, and not on the drug itself. Behavioral sensitization describes the opposite phenomenon.

== See also ==
- Addiction
- Cross-sensitization
- Cross-tolerance
- Desensitization
- Drug dependence
- Rebound effect
- Sensitization
