= Sensitization =

Non-associative learning process

Sensitization is a psychological phenomenon whereby repeated exposure to a stimulus results in the progressive enhancement of a response that is not specific to the original stimulus. The concept has been studied using the reflexes of animals such as Aplysia to better understand the underlying neural mechanisms. Research on sensitization includes a range of phenomena including drug sensitization and cross-sensitization, where a response is enhanced for a whole class of stimuli in addition to the original repeated stimulus. It has also been implicated in the pathologies of various health disorders.

== History ==
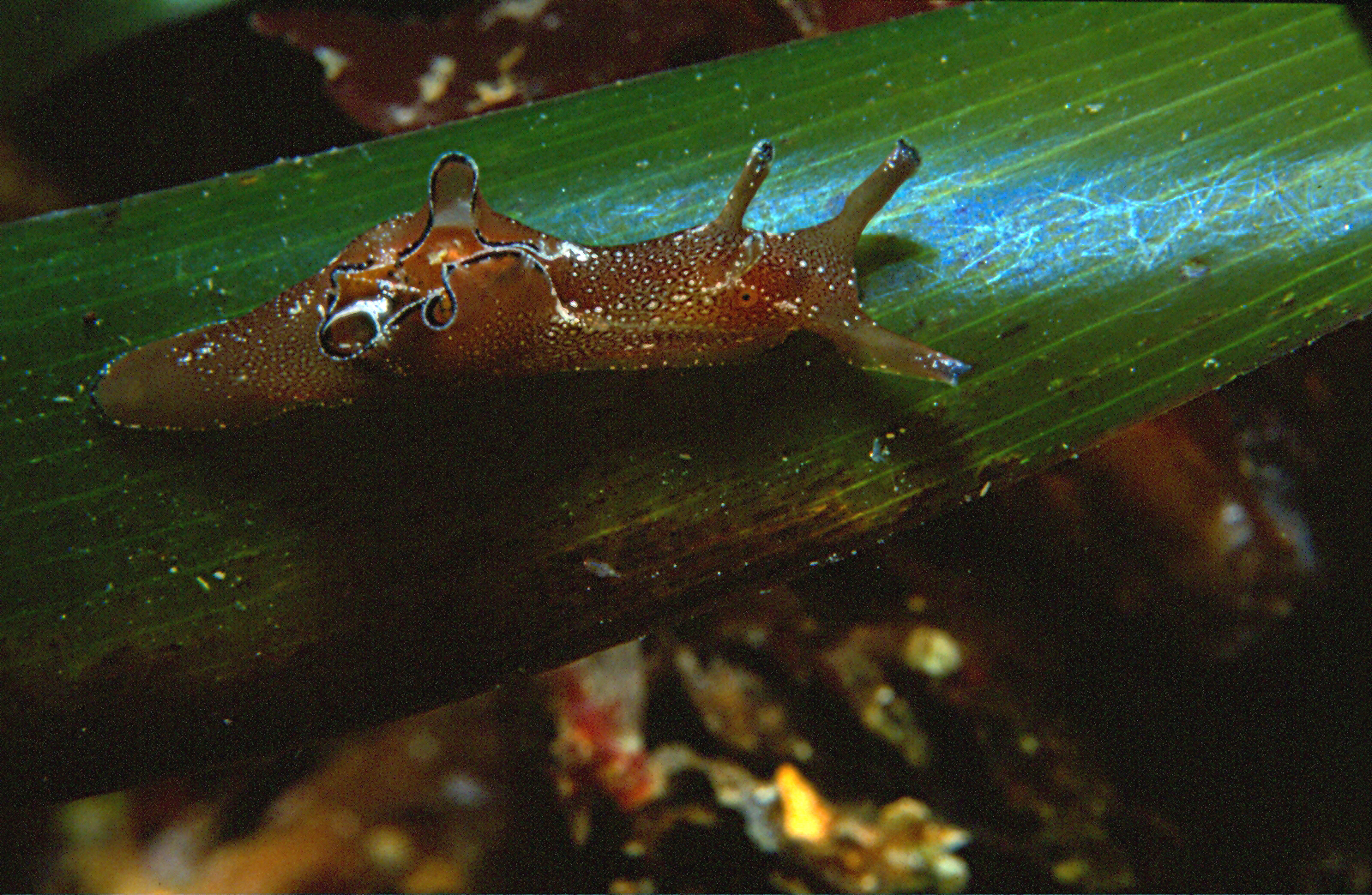
Aplysia with its siphon exposed on the posterior dorsal side.

Eric Kandel was one of the first researchers to study the neural basis of sensitization, aiming to understand the cellular and molecular mechanisms of learning and memory. He began conducting experiments in the 1960s and 1970s on the gill withdrawal reflex of the sea slug Aplysia. Kandel and his colleagues first habituated the reflex by repeatedly touching the animal's siphon until the gill withdrawal response was weakened. They then paired a noxious electrical shock to the tail with a touch to the siphon, causing the gill withdrawal response to reappear. After this sensitization, a light touch to the siphon alone produced a strong gill withdrawal response, and this sensitization effect lasted for several days. Further research in the Kandel laboratory revealed the role of the neurotransmitter serotonin in this process by initiating the cAMP-PKA signaling pathway that results in synaptic strengthening. In 2000, Eric Kandel was awarded the Nobel Prize in Physiology or Medicine for his research in neuronal learning processes.

== Neural mechanisms of sensitization ==
As with many learning and memory processes, the biological basis of short-term sensitization differs from long-term sensitization. In Aplysia, for example, a single shock to the tail results in short-term sensitization because the heightened gill withdrawal response lasts only a few minutes. After multiple shocks are administered per day over a few days, however, the heightened response lasts for weeks. This long-term sensitization requires protein synthesis, unlike short-term sensitization.

In short-term sensitization in Aplysia, a tail shock causes a brief release of serotonin (5-HT) onto 5-HT receptors of the presynaptic sensory neuron. This initiates the cyclic AMP second messenger system via the enzyme adenylyl cyclase, activating cAMP-dependent protein kinase A (PKA). This can lead to phosphorylation of channels in the presynaptic membrane which increases neurotransmitter release.

In long-term sensitization, the activation of PKA is prolonged, allowing its catalytic subunits enough time to enter the nucleus. In the nucleus, PKA works with mitogen-activated protein kinase (MAPK) to activate cAMP response element-binding (CREB) protein. As a result, genes are expressed, new proteins are synthesized, and new synaptic connections are formed.

== Neural substrates ==
Addiction and dependence glossary
- addiction – a neuropsychological disorder characterized by a persistent and intense urge to use a drug or engage in a behavior that produces natural reward; addictive drug – psychoactive substances that with repeated use are associated with significantly higher rates of substance use disorders, due in large part to the drug's effect on brain reward systems; dependence – an adaptive state associated with a withdrawal syndrome upon cessation of repeated exposure to a stimulus (e.g., drug intake); drug sensitization or reverse tolerance – the escalating effect of a drug resulting from repeated administration at a given dose; drug withdrawal – symptoms that occur upon cessation of repeated drug use; physical dependence – dependence that involves persistent physical–somatic withdrawal symptoms (e.g., delirium tremens and nausea); psychological dependence – dependence that is characterized by emotional-motivational withdrawal symptoms (e.g., anhedonia and anxiety) that affect cognitive functioning.; reinforcing stimuli – stimuli that increase the probability of repeating behaviors paired with them; rewarding stimuli – stimuli that the brain interprets as intrinsically positive and desirable or as something to approach; sensitization – an amplified response to a stimulus resulting from repeated exposure to it; substance use disorder – a condition in which the use of substances leads to clinically and functionally significant impairment or distress; drug tolerance – the diminishing effect of a drug resulting from repeated administration at a given dose

The neural basis of behavioral sensitization is often unknown, but it typically results from a cellular receptor becoming more likely to respond to a stimulus. Several examples of neural sensitization include:

- Electrical or chemical stimulation of the rat hippocampus causes strengthening of synaptic signals, a process known as long-term potentiation (LTP). The LTP of AMPA receptors is a potential mechanism underlying memory and learning in the brain.
- In kindling, repeated stimulation of hippocampal or amygdaloid neurons in the limbic system eventually leads to seizures in laboratory animals. After sensitization, very little stimulation may be required to produce seizures. Thus, kindling has been suggested as a model for temporal lobe epilepsy in humans, where stimulation of a repetitive type (flickering lights for instance) can cause epileptic seizures. Often, people suffering from temporal lobe epilepsy report symptoms of negative effects such as anxiety and depression that might result from limbic dysfunction.
- In central sensitization, nociceptive neurons in the dorsal horns of the spinal cord become sensitized by peripheral tissue damage or inflammation. This type of sensitization has been suggested as a possible causal mechanism for chronic pain conditions. The changes of central sensitization occur after repeated trials to pain. Research from animals has consistently shown that when a trial is repeatedly exposed to a painful stimulus, the animal’s pain threshold will decrease and result in a stronger pain response. Researchers believe that there are parallels that can be drawn between these animal trials and persistent pain in people. For example, after a back surgery that removed a herniated disc from causing a pinched nerve, the patient may still continue to feel pain. Also, newborns who are circumcised without anesthesia have shown stronger reactions to similar future procedures than those who were given anesthesia.
- Drug sensitization (or reverse tolerance) occurs in substance use disorder, and is defined as an increased effect of drug following repeated doses (the opposite of drug tolerance). Such sensitization involves changes in brain mesolimbic dopamine transmission, as well as a protein inside mesolimbic neurons called delta FosB. An associative process may contribute to addiction, for environmental stimuli associated with drug taking may increase craving. This process may increase the risk for relapse in addicts attempting to quit.

== Cross-sensitization ==
Cross-sensitization is a phenomenon in which sensitization to a stimulus is generalized to a related stimulus, resulting in the amplification of a particular response to both the original stimulus and the related stimulus. For example, types of cross-sensitization to the neural and behavioral effects of addictive drugs well characterized, such as sensitization to the locomotor response of a stimulant resulting in cross-sensitization to the motor-activating effects of other stimulants. Similarly, reward sensitization to a particular addictive drug often results in reward cross-sensitization, which entails sensitization to the rewarding property of other addictive drugs in the same drug class or even certain natural rewards.

In animals, cross-sensitization has been established between the consumption of many different types of drugs of abuse – in line with the gateway drug theory – and also between sugar consumption and the self-administration of drugs of abuse.

== As a causal factor in pathology ==
Sensitization has been implied as a causal or maintaining mechanism in a wide range of apparently unrelated pathologies including addiction, allergies, asthma, overactive bladder, and potentially contribute to some medically unexplained syndromes such as fibromyalgia, as well as the controversial diagnosis multiple chemical sensitivity. Sensitization may also contribute to psychological disorders such as post-traumatic stress disorder, anxiety disorder or panic disorder, and mood disorders.

== See also ==
- Long-term potentiation
- Multiple chemical sensitivity
- Neuroplasticity
- Synaptic plasticity
- Tocqueville effect
