= Physical dependence =

Physical condition caused by chronic use of a tolerance-forming drug

Addiction and dependence glossary
- addiction – a neuropsychological disorder characterized by a persistent and intense urge to use a drug or engage in a behavior that produces natural reward; addictive drug – psychoactive substances that with repeated use are associated with significantly higher rates of substance use disorders, due in large part to the drug's effect on brain reward systems; dependence – an adaptive state associated with a withdrawal syndrome upon cessation of repeated exposure to a stimulus (e.g., drug intake); drug sensitization or reverse tolerance – the escalating effect of a drug resulting from repeated administration at a given dose; drug withdrawal – symptoms that occur upon cessation of repeated drug use; physical dependence – dependence that involves persistent physical–somatic withdrawal symptoms (e.g., delirium tremens and nausea); psychological dependence – dependence that is characterized by emotional-motivational withdrawal symptoms (e.g., anhedonia and anxiety) that affect cognitive functioning.; reinforcing stimuli – stimuli that increase the probability of repeating behaviors paired with them; rewarding stimuli – stimuli that the brain interprets as intrinsically positive and desirable or as something to approach; sensitization – an amplified response to a stimulus resulting from repeated exposure to it; substance use disorder – a condition in which the use of substances leads to clinically and functionally significant impairment or distress; drug tolerance – the diminishing effect of a drug resulting from repeated administration at a given dose

Physical dependence is a physical condition caused by chronic use of a tolerance-forming drug, in which abrupt or gradual drug withdrawal causes unpleasant physical symptoms. Physical dependence can develop from low-dose therapeutic use of certain medications such as benzodiazepines, opioids, stimulants, antiepileptics and antidepressants, as well as the recreational misuse of drugs such as alcohol, opioids and benzodiazepines. The higher the dose used, the greater the duration of use, and the earlier age use began are predictive of worsened physical dependence and thus more severe withdrawal syndromes. Acute withdrawal syndromes can last days, weeks or months. Protracted withdrawal syndrome, also known as post-acute-withdrawal syndrome or "PAWS", is a low-grade continuation of some of the symptoms of acute withdrawal, typically in a remitting-relapsing pattern, often resulting in relapse and prolonged disability of a degree to preclude the possibility of lawful employment. Protracted withdrawal syndrome can last for months, years, or depending on individual factors, indefinitely. Protracted withdrawal syndrome is noted to be most often caused by benzodiazepines as well as opioids. To dispel the popular misassociation with addiction, physical dependence to medications is sometimes compared to dependence on insulin by persons with diabetes.

== Symptoms ==
Physical dependence can manifest itself in the appearance of both physical and psychological symptoms which are caused by physiological adaptions in the central nervous system and the brain due to chronic exposure to a substance. Symptoms which may be experienced during withdrawal or reduction in dosage include increased heart rate and/or blood pressure, sweating, and tremors. More serious withdrawal symptoms such as confusion, seizures, and visual hallucinations indicate a serious emergency and the need for immediate medical care. Sedative hypnotic drugs such as alcohol, benzodiazepines, and barbiturates are the only commonly available substances that can be fatal in withdrawal due to their propensity to induce withdrawal convulsions. Abrupt withdrawal from other drugs, such as opioids can cause an extremely painful withdrawal that is very rarely fatal in patients of general good health and with medical treatment, but is more often fatal in patients with weakened cardiovascular systems; toxicity is generally caused by the often-extreme increases in heart rate and blood pressure (which can be treated with clonidine), or due to arrhythmia due to electrolyte imbalance caused by the inability to eat, and constant diarrhea and vomiting (which can be treated with loperamide and ondansetron respectively) associated with acute opioid withdrawal, especially in longer-acting substances where the diarrhea and emesis can continue unabated for weeks, although life-threatening complications are extremely rare, and nearly non-existent with proper medical management.

== Treatment ==
Treatment for physical dependence depends upon the drug being withdrawn and often includes administration of another drug, especially for substances that can be dangerous when abruptly discontinued or when previous attempts have failed. Physical dependence is usually managed by a slow dose reduction over a period of weeks, months or sometimes longer depending on the drug, dose and the individual. A physical dependence on alcohol is often managed with a cross tolerant drug, such as long acting benzodiazepines to manage the alcohol withdrawal symptoms.

== Drugs that cause physical dependence ==
- All μ-opioids with any (even slight) agonist effect, such as (partial list) morphine, heroin, codeine, oxycodone, buprenorphine, nalbuphine, methadone, and fentanyl, but not agonists specific to non-μ opioid receptors, such as salvinorin A (a k-opioid agonist), nor opioid antagonists or inverse agonists, such as naltrexone (a universal opioid inverse agonist)
- All GABA agonists and positive allosteric modulators of both the GABA-A ionotropic receptor and GABA-B metabotropic receptor subunits, including (partial list):
  - alcohol (alcoholic beverage) (cf. alcohol dependence, alcohol withdrawal, delirium tremens)
  - barbiturates such as phenobarbital, sodium thiopental and secobarbital
  - benzodiazepines such as diazepam (Valium), lorazepam (Ativan), and alprazolam (Xanax) (see benzodiazepine dependence and benzodiazepine withdrawal syndrome)
  - nonbenzodiazepine hypnotics (z-drugs) such as zopiclone and zolpidem.
  - gamma-hydroxybutyric acid (GHB) and 1,4-butanediol
  - carisoprodol (Soma) and related carbamates (tybamate, meprobamate, ethinamate etc.)
  - baclofen (Lioresal) and its non-chlorinated analogue phenibut
  - chloral hydrate
  - glutethimide
  - clomethiazole
  - methaqualone (Quaalude)
- Nicotine (tobacco) (cf. nicotine withdrawal)
- Gabapentinoids such as gabapentin (Neurontin), Pregabalin (Lyrica), and phenibut (Noofen), Baclofen (Lioresal), which are inhibitors of α_{2}δ subunit-containing VDCCs
- Antiepileptic drugs such as valproate, lamotrigine, tiagabine, vigabatrin, carbamazepine and oxcarbazepine, and topiramate
- Antipsychotic drugs such as clozapine, risperidone, olanzapine, haloperidol, thioridazine, etc.
- Commonly prescribed antidepressants such as the selective serotonin reuptake inhibitors (SSRIs) and serotonin-norepinephrine reuptake inhibitors (SNRIs) (cf. SSRI/SNRI withdrawal syndrome)
- Sympatholytic medications, including beta blockers such as propranolol and alpha-adrenergic agonists such as clonidine
- Androgenic-anabolic steroids
- Glucocorticoids
- Other topical decongestants such as xylometazoline and oxymetazoline

== Rebound syndrome ==
A wide range of drugs whilst not causing a true physical dependence can still cause withdrawal symptoms or rebound effects during dosage reduction or especially abrupt or rapid withdrawal. These can include caffeine, stimulants, steroidal drugs and antiparkinsonian drugs. It is debated whether the entire antipsychotic drug class causes true physical dependency, a subset, or if none do. But, if discontinued too rapidly, it could cause an acute withdrawal syndrome. When talking about illicit drugs rebound withdrawal, especially with stimulants, it is sometimes referred to as "coming down" or "crashing".

Some drugs, like anticonvulsants and antidepressants, describe the drug category and not the mechanism. The individual agents and drug classes in the anticonvulsant drug category act at many different receptors and it is not possible to generalize their potential for physical dependence or incidence or severity of rebound syndrome as a group so they must be looked at individually. Anticonvulsants as a group however are known to cause tolerance to the anti-seizure effect. SSRI drugs, which have an important use as antidepressants, engender a discontinuation syndrome that manifests with physical side effects; e.g., there have been case reports of a discontinuation syndrome with venlafaxine (Effexor).

== See also ==
- Drug tolerance
- Psychological dependence
- Rebound insomnia
- Substance dependence
