= International Programme on Chemical Safety =

International organization

The International Programme on Chemical Safety (IPCS) was formed in 1980 and is a collaboration between three United Nations bodies, the World Health Organization, the International Labour Organization and the United Nations Environment Programme, to establish a scientific basis for safe use of chemicals and to strengthen national capabilities and capacities for chemical safety.

A related joint project with the same aim, IPCS INCHEM, is a collaboration between IPCS and the Canadian Centre for Occupational Health and Safety (CCOHS).

The IPCS identifies the following as "chemicals of major public health concern":

- Air pollution
- Arsenic
- Asbestos
- Benzene
- Cadmium
- Dioxins and dioxin-like compounds
- Inadequate or excess fluoride
- Lead
- Mercury
- Highly hazardous pesticides

== See also ==
- Acceptable daily intake
- International Chemical Safety Card
- Concise International Chemical Assessment Document
- Food safety
