= Benzodiazepine use disorder =

Illicit use of benzodiazepine drugs

- Other names: Benzodiazepine drug misuse
- Specialty: Addiction Medicine, Psychiatry

Benzodiazepine use disorder, also called misuse or abuse, is the use of benzodiazepines without a prescription or for recreational purposes, which poses risks of dependence, withdrawal, and other long-term effects. Benzodiazepines are one of the more common prescription drugs used recreationally. When used recreationally benzodiazepines are usually administered orally but sometimes are taken intranasally, which rarely has any impact on the overall quality or speed of onset due to overall poor quality absorption via mucous membranes, or intravenously. Recreational use produces effects similar to alcohol intoxication.

In tests in pentobarbital-trained rhesus monkeys benzodiazepines produced effects similar to barbiturates. In a 1991 study, triazolam had the highest self-administration rate in cocaine-trained baboons, among the five benzodiazepines examined: alprazolam, bromazepam, chlordiazepoxide, lorazepam, triazolam. A 1985 study found that triazolam and temazepam maintained higher rates of self-injection in both human and animal subjects compared to a variety of other benzodiazepines (others examined: diazepam, lorazepam, oxazepam, flurazepam, alprazolam, chlordiazepoxide, clonazepam, nitrazepam, flunitrazepam, bromazepam, and clorazepate). A 1991 study indicated that diazepam, in particular, had a greater abuse liability among people who were drug abusers than did many of the other benzodiazepines. Some of the available data also suggested that lorazepam and alprazolam are more diazepam-like in having relatively high abuse liability, while oxazepam, halazepam, and possibly chlordiazepoxide, are relatively low in this regard. A 1991–1993 British study found that the hypnotics flurazepam and temazepam were more toxic than average benzodiazepines in overdose. A 1995 study found that temazepam is more rapidly absorbed and oxazepam is more slowly absorbed than most other benzodiazepines. Benzodiazepines have been abused both orally and intravenously. Different benzodiazepines have different abuse potential; the more rapid the increase in the plasma level following ingestion, the greater the intoxicating effect and the more open to abuse the drug becomes. The speed of onset of action of a particular benzodiazepine correlates well with the 'popularity' of that drug for abuse. The two most common reasons for preference were that a benzodiazepine was 'strong' and that it gave a good 'high'.

According to Dr. Chris Ford, former clinical director of Substance Misuse Management in General Practice, among drugs of abuse, benzodiazepines are often seen as the 'bad guys' by drug and alcohol workers. Illicit users of benzodiazepines have been found to take higher methadone doses, as well as showing more HIV/HCV risk-taking behavior, greater poly-drug use, higher levels of psychopathology and social dysfunction. However, there is only limited research into the adverse effects of benzodiazepines in drug misusers and it is unclear whether this is the result of cause or effect.

== Signs and symptoms ==
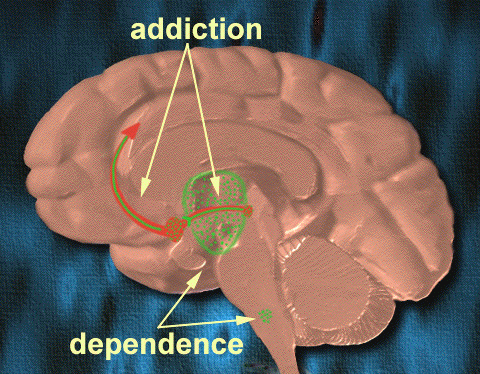
Benzodiazepines can induce a severe benzodiazepine withdrawal syndrome as well as drug seeking behavior.

Sedative-hypnotics such as alcohol, benzodiazepines, and the barbiturates are known for the severe physical dependence that they are capable of inducing which can result in severe withdrawal effects. This severe neuroadaptation is even more profound in people that use high doses. A high degree of tolerance often occurs in people who use benzodiazepine long term, especially if they take high doses, which can lead to benzodiazepine dependence. The benzodiazepine withdrawal syndrome seen in chronic high dose benzodiazepine users is similar to that seen in therapeutic low dose users but of a more severe nature. Extreme antisocial behaviors in obtaining continued supplies and severe drug-seeking behavior when withdrawals occur. The severity of the benzodiazepine withdrawal syndrome has been described by one benzodiazepine drug misuser who stated that:

I'd rather withdraw off heroin any day. If I was withdrawing from benzos you could offer me a gram of heroin or just 20mg of diazepam and I'd take the diazepam every time – I've never been so frightened in my life.

Those who use benzodiazepines intermittently are less likely to develop a dependence and withdrawal symptoms upon dose reduction or cessation of benzodiazepines than those who use benzodiazepines on a daily basis.

Misuse of benzodiazepines is widespread amongst drug misusers; however, many of these people will not require withdrawal management as their use is often restricted to binges or occasional misuse. Benzodiazepine dependence when it occurs requires withdrawal treatment. There is little evidence of benefit from long-term substitution therapy of benzodiazepines, and conversely, there is growing evidence of the harm of long-term use of benzodiazepines, especially higher doses. Therefore, gradual reduction is recommended, titrated against withdrawal symptoms. For withdrawal purposes, stabilisation with a long-acting agent such as diazepam is recommended before commencing withdrawal. Chlordiazepoxide (Librium), a long-acting benzodiazepine, is gaining attention as an alternative to diazepam in substance abusers dependent on benzodiazepines due to its decreased abuse potential. In individuals dependent on benzodiazepines who have been using benzodiazepines long-term, taper regimens of 6–12 months have been recommended and found to be more successful. More rapid detoxifications e.g. of a month are not recommended as they lead to more severe withdrawal symptoms.

Tolerance leads to a reduction in GABA receptors and function; when benzodiazepines are reduced or stopped this leads to an unmasking of these compensatory changes in the nervous system with the appearance of physical and mental withdrawal effects such as anxiety, insomnia, autonomic hyperactivity and possibly seizures.

=== Common withdrawal symptoms ===
Include the following:

- Depression
- Shaking
- Feeling unreal
- Appetite loss
- Muscle twitching
- Severe and debilitating insomnia
- Memory loss
- Motor impairment
- Nausea
- Muscle pains
- Dizziness
- Apparent movement of still objects
- Feeling faint
- Noise sensitivity
- Light sensitivity
- Peculiar taste
- Pins and needles
- Touch sensitivity
- Sore eyes
- Hallucinations
- Smell sensitivity

All sedative-hypnotics, e.g. alcohol, barbiturates, benzodiazepines and Z-drugs have a similar mechanism of action, working on the GABA_{A} receptor complex and are cross tolerant with each other and also have abuse potential. Use of prescription sedative-hypnotics—for example, the nonbenzodiazepine Z-drugs—often leads to a relapse back into substance misuse with one author stating this occurs in over a quarter of those who have achieved abstinence.

=== Background ===
Benzodiazepines are a commonly abused class of drugs, although there is debate as to whether certain benzodiazepines have higher abuse potential than others. In animal and human studies the abuse potential of benzodiazepines is classed as moderate in comparison to other drugs of abuse. Benzodiazepines are commonly abused by poly drug users, especially heroin addicts, alcoholics or amphetamine addicts when "coming down", but sometimes are misused in isolation as the primary drug of misuse. They can be misused to achieve the high that benzodiazepines produce or more commonly they are used to either enhance the effects of other CNS depressant drugs, to stave off withdrawal effects of other drugs or combat the effects of stimulants. As many as 30–50% of alcoholics are also benzodiazepine misusers. Drug abusers often abuse high doses or even therapeutic doses for long periods of time which makes serious benzodiazepine withdrawal symptoms such as psychosis or convulsions more likely to occur during withdrawal.

Benzodiazepine abuse increases risk-taking behaviors such as unprotected sex and sharing of needles amongst intravenous abusers of benzodiazepines. Abuse is also associated with blackouts, memory loss, aggression, violence, and chaotic behavior associated with paranoia. There is little support for long-term maintenance of benzodiazepine abusers and thus a withdrawal regime is indicated when benzodiazepine abuse becomes a dependence. The main source of illicit benzodiazepines are diverted benzodiazepines obtained originally on prescription; other sources include thefts from pharmacies and pharmaceutical warehouses. Benzodiazepine abuse is steadily increasing and is now a major public health problem. Benzodiazepine abuse is mostly limited to individuals who abuse other drugs, i.e. poly-drug abusers. Most prescribed users do not abuse their medication, however, some high dose prescribed users do become involved with the illicit drug scene. Abuse of benzodiazepines occurs in a wide age range of people and includes teenagers and the old. The abuse potential or drug-liking effects appears to be dose related, with low doses of benzodiazepines having limited drug liking effects but higher doses increasing the abuse potential/drug-liking properties.

=== Health related complications ===
Complications of benzodiazepine abuse include drug-related deaths due to overdose especially in combination with other depressant drugs such as opioids. Other complications include: blackouts and memory loss, paranoia, violence and criminal behaviour, risk-taking sexual behaviour, foetal and neonatal risks if taken in pregnancy, dependence, withdrawal seizures and psychosis. Long-term use of benzodiazepines can worsen pre-existing depression and anxiety and may potentially also cause dementia with impairments in recent and remote memory functions.

Use is widespread among amphetamine users, with those that use amphetamines and benzodiazepines having greater levels of mental health problems and social deterioration. Benzodiazepine injectors are almost four times more likely to inject using a shared needle than non-benzodiazepine-using injectors. It has been concluded in various studies that benzodiazepine use causes greater levels of risk and psycho-social dysfunction among drug misusers. Poly-drug users who also use benzodiazepines appear to engage in more frequent high-risk behaviors. Polydrug use involving benzodiazepines and alcohol can result in blackouts, increased risk-taking behaviour, and in severe cases seizures and overdose. Those who use stimulant and depressant drugs are more likely to report adverse reactions from stimulant use, more likely to be injecting stimulants and more likely to have been treated for a drug problem than those using stimulant but not depressant drugs.

== Risk factors ==
Individuals with a substance abuse history are at an increased risk of misusing benzodiazepines.

Several (primary research) studies, even into the last decade, claimed that individuals with a history of familial abuse of alcohol or who are siblings or children of alcoholics appeared to respond differently to benzodiazepines than so called genetically healthy persons, with males experiencing increased euphoric effects and females having exaggerated responses to the adverse effects of benzodiazepines.

Whilst all benzodiazepines have abuse potential, certain characteristics increase the potential of particular benzodiazepines for abuse. Worldwide, diazepam is the benzodiazepine most frequently encountered by customs and law enforcement. Diazepam is available very cheaply in every country. These characteristics are chiefly practical ones—most especially, availability (often based on popular perception of 'dangerous' versus 'not dangerous' drugs) through prescribing physicians or illicit distributors. Pharmacological and pharmacokinetic factors are also crucial in determining abuse potentials. A short elimination half-life and a rapid onset of action are characteristics which increase the abuse potential of a benzodiazepines. The following table provides the elimination half-life, approximate equivalent doses, speed of onset of action, and duration of behavioural effects.

Drug Name	Common Brand Names*	Onset of action	Duration of action (h)**	Elimination Half-Life (h) [active metabolite]	Approximate Equivalent Dose (PO)***
Alprazolam	Xanax, Xanor, Tafil, Alprox, Niravam, Ksalol, Solanax	Intermediate	3–5	11-13 [10–20 hours]	0.5 mg
Chlordiazepoxide	Librium, Tropium, Risolid, Klopoxid	Intermediate	4-6	5–30 hours [36–200 hours]	25 mg
Clonazepam	Klonopin, Klonapin, Rivotril, Iktorivil	Intermediate	10–12	18–50 hours	0.5 mg
Clorazepate	Tranxene	Intermediate	6-8	[36–100 hours]	15 mg
Diazepam	Valium, Apzepam, Stesolid, Vival, Apozepam, Hexalid, Valaxona	Fast	1–6	20–100 hours [36–200]	10 mg
Etizolam****	Etivan	Fast	5-7	6-8 h	1 mg
Estazolam	ProSom	Slow	2–6	10–24 h	2 mg
Flunitrazepam	Rohypnol, Fluscand, Flunipam, Ronal	Fast	6–8	18–26 hours [36–200 hours]	1 mg
Flurazepam	Dalmadorm, Dalmane	Fast	7–10	20 mg	
Lorazepam	Ativan, Temesta, Lorabenz, Tavor	Intermediate	2–6	10–20 hours	1 mg
Midazolam	Dormicum, Versed, Hypnovel, Flormidal	Fast	0.5–1	3 hours (1.8–6 hours)	10 mg
Nitrazepam	Mogadon, Nitrosun, Epam, Alodorm, Insomin	Fast	4-8	16–38 hours	10 mg
Oxazepam	Seresta, Serax, Serenid, Serepax, Sobril, Oxascand, Alopam, Oxabenz, Oxapax	Slow	4–6	4–15 hours	30 mg
Prazepam	Lysanxia, Centrax	Intermediate	6-9	36–200 hours	20 mg
Quazepam	Doral	Slow	6	39–120 hours	20 mg
Temazepam	Restoril, Normison, Euhypnos, Tenox	Fast	1-4	4–11 hours	20 mg
Triazolam	Halcion, Rilamir	Fast	0.5–1	2 hours	0.25 mg

*Not all trade names are listed. Click on the drug name to see a more comprehensive list.
**The duration of apparent action is usually considerably less than the half-life. With most benzodiazepines, noticeable effects usually wear off within a few hours. Nevertheless, as long as the drug is present it will exert subtle effects within the body. These effects may become apparent during continued use or may appear as withdrawal symptoms when dosage is reduced or the drug is stopped.
***Equivalent doses are based on clinical experience but may vary between individuals.
****Etizolam is not a true benzodiazepine but has similar chemistry, effects, and abuse potential.

== Epidemiology ==
Little attention has focused on the degree that benzodiazepines are abused as a primary drug of choice, but they are frequently abused alongside other drugs of abuse, especially alcohol, stimulants and opiates. The benzodiazepine most commonly abused can vary from country to country and depends on factors including local popularity as well as which benzodiazepines are available. Nitrazepam for example is commonly abused in Nepal and the United Kingdom, whereas in the United States where nitrazepam is not available on prescription other benzodiazepines are more commonly abused. In the United Kingdom and Australia there have been epidemics of temazepam abuse. Particular problems with abuse of temazepam are often related to gel capsules being melted and injected and drug-related deaths. Injecting most benzodiazepines is dangerous because of their relative insolubility in water (with the exception of midazolam), leading to potentially serious adverse health consequences for users.

Benzodiazepines are a commonly misused class of drug. A study in Sweden found that benzodiazepines are the most common drug class of forged prescriptions in Sweden. Concentrations of benzodiazepines detected in impaired motor vehicle drivers often exceeding therapeutic doses have been reported in Sweden and in Northern Ireland. One of the hallmarks of problematic benzodiazepine drug misuse is escalation of dose. Most licit prescribed users of benzodiazepines do not escalate their dose of benzodiazepines.

== Society and culture ==
=== Drug-related crime ===
Problem benzodiazepine use can be associated with various deviant behaviors, including drug-related crime. In a survey of police detainees carried out by the Australian Government, both legal and illegal users of benzodiazepines were found to be more likely to have lived on the streets, less likely to have been in full-time work and more likely to have used heroin or methamphetamines in the past 30 days from the date of taking part in the survey. Benzodiazepine users were also more likely to be receiving illegal incomes and more likely to have been arrested or imprisoned in the previous year. Benzodiazepines were sometimes reported to be used alone, but most often formed part of a poly drug-using problem. Female users were more likely than men to be using heroin, whereas male users were more likely to report amphetamine use. Benzodiazepine users were more likely than non-users to claim government financial benefits and benzodiazepine users who were also poly-drug users were the most likely to be claiming government financial benefits. Those who reported using benzodiazepines alone were found to be in the mid-range when compared to other drug using patterns in terms of property crimes and criminal breaches. Of the detainees reporting benzodiazepine use, one in five reported injection use, mostly of illicit temazepam, with some who reported injecting prescribed benzodiazepines. The injection was a concern in this survey due to increased health risks. The main problems highlighted in this survey were concerns of dependence, the potential for overdose of benzodiazepines in combination with opiates and the health problems associated with injection of benzodiazepines.

Benzodiazepines are also sometimes used for drug facilitated sexual assaults and robbery, however, alcohol remains the most common drug involved in drug facilitated assaults. The muscle relaxant, disinhibiting and amnesia producing effects of benzodiazepines are the pharmacological properties which make these drugs effective in drug-facilitated crimes. Serial killer Jeffrey Dahmer admitted to using triazolam (Halcion), and occasionally temazepam (Restoril), in order to sedate his victims prior to murdering them.

In a 2017 publication, an analysis of the blood samples of 22 victims of drug-facilitated robberies in Bangladesh revealed that criminals use different mixtures of Benzodiazepines including Lorazepam, Midazolam, Diazepam and Nordiazepam to immobilize and then rob their victims.

=== Drug regulation and enforcement ===
==== Europe ====
Temazepam abuse and seizures have been falling in the UK probably due to its reclassification as Schedule 3 controlled drug with tighter prescribing restrictions and the resultant reduction in availability. A total of 2.75 million temazepam capsules were seized in the Netherlands by authorities between 1996 and 1999. In Northern Ireland statistics of individuals attending drug addiction treatment centers found that benzodiazepines were the 2nd most commonly reported main problem drugs (31 percent of attendees). Cannabis was the top with 35 percent of individuals reporting it as their main problem drug. The statistics showed that treatment for benzodiazepines as the main problematic drug had more than doubled from the previous year and was a growing problem in Northern Ireland.

==== Oceania ====
Benzodiazepines are common drugs of abuse in Australia and New Zealand, particularly among those who may also be using other illicit drugs. The intravenous use of temazepam poses the greatest threat to those who misuse benzodiazepines. Simultaneous consumption of temazepam with heroin is a potential risk factor of overdose. An Australian study of non-fatal heroin overdoses noted that 26% of heroin users had consumed temazepam at the time of their overdose. This is consistent with an NSW investigation of coronial files from 1992. Temazepam was found in 26% of heroin-related deaths. Temazepam, including tablet formulations, are used intravenously. In an Australian study of 210 heroin users who used temazepam, 48% had injected it. Although abuse of benzodiazepines has decreased over the past few years, temazepam continues to be a major drug of abuse in Australia. In certain states like Victoria and Queensland, temazepam accounts for most benzodiazepine sought by forgery of prescriptions and through pharmacy burglary. Darke, Ross & Hall found that different benzodiazepines have different abuse potential. The more rapid the increase in the plasma level following ingestion, the greater the intoxicating effect and the more open to abuse the drug becomes. The speed of onset of action of a particular benzodiazepine correlates well with the 'popularity' of that drug for abuse. The two most common reasons for preference for a benzodiazepine were that it was the 'strongest' and that it gave a good 'high'.

==== North America ====
The most frequently abused of the benzodiazepines in both the United States and Canada are alprazolam, clonazepam, lorazepam and diazepam. In Canada, bromazepam is marketed and is a highly effective anxiolytic, muscle-relaxant, and sedative. Bromazepam has shown itself to be at least as effective as alprazolam as anxiolytic, and a superior sedative.

==== East and Southeast Asia ====
The Central Narcotics Bureau of Singapore seized 94,200 nimetazepam tablets in 2003. This is the largest nimetazepam seizure recorded since nimetazepam became a controlled drug under the Misuse of Drugs Act in 1992. In Singapore nimetazepam is a Class C controlled drug.

In Hong Kong abuse of prescription medicinal preparations continued in 2006 and seizures of midazolam (120,611 tablets), nimetazepam/nitrazepam (17,457 tablets), triazolam (1,071 tablets), diazepam (48,923 tablets) and chlordiazepoxide (5,853 tablets) were made. Heroin addicts used such tablets (crushed and mixed with heroin) to prolong the effect of the narcotic and ease withdrawal symptoms.

== See also ==
- Drug abuse
- Benzodiazepine overdose
- Effects of long-term benzodiazepine use
- Drug facilitated sexual assault
