= C16H13N3O3 =

The molecular formula C_{16}H_{13}N_{3}O_{3} (molar mass: 295.29 g/mol, exact mass: 295.0957 u) may refer to:

- Nimetazepam
- Mebendazole (MBZ)
