= Drug-related crime =

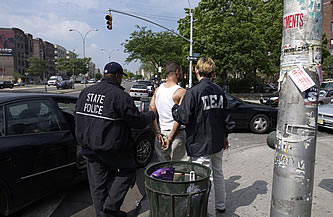
DEA Operation Mallorca, 2005

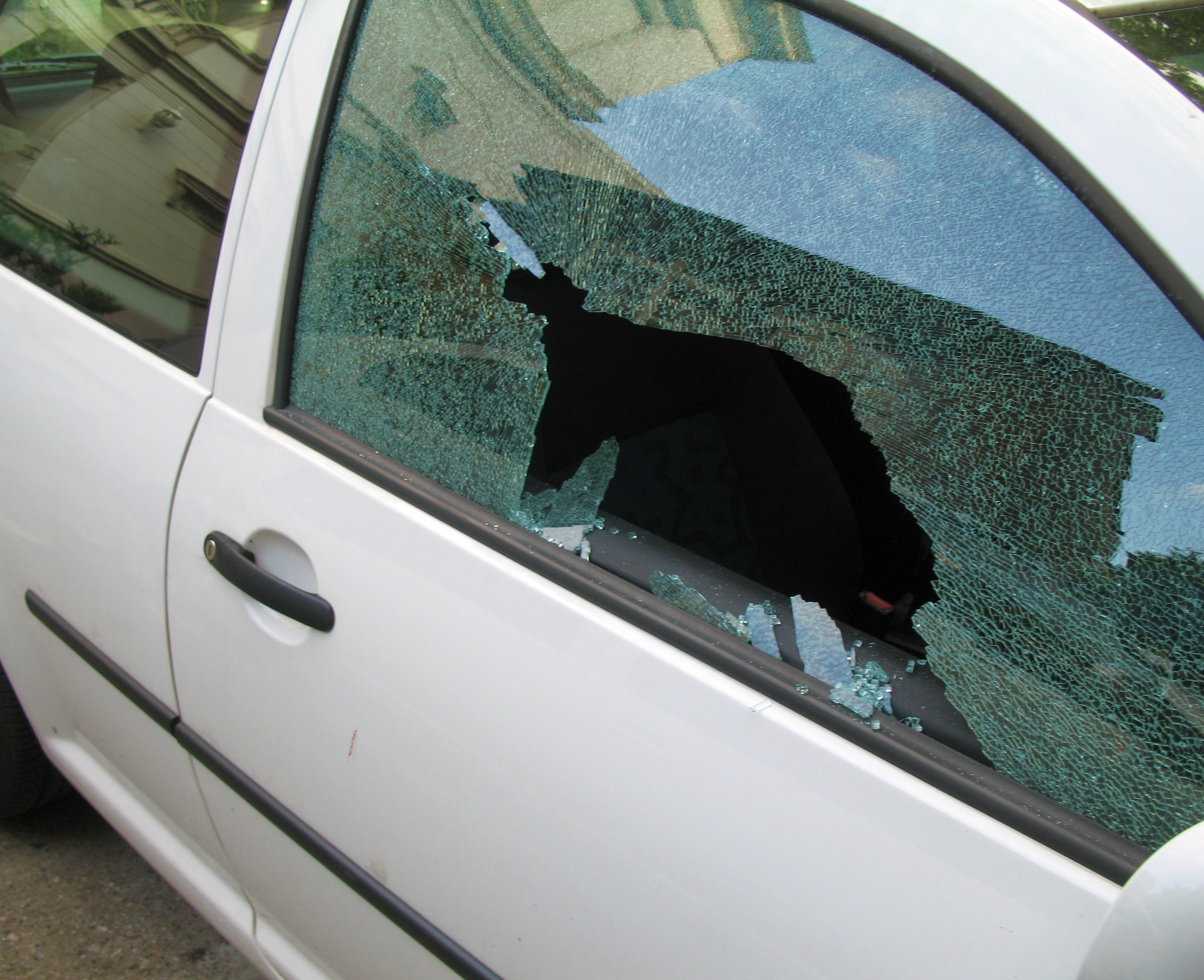
Typical collateral damage of drug-related theft

Drug-related crime involves possessing, manufacturing, or distributing drugs classified as having a potential for abuse (such as cocaine, heroin, morphine and amphetamines). Drugs are also related to crime as drug trafficking and drug production are often controlled by drug cartels, organised crime and gangs. Some drug-related crime involves crime against the person such as robbery or sexual assaults.

== U.S. Bureau of Justice Statistics ==
In 2002, in the U.S. about a quarter of convicted property and drug offenders in local jails had committed their crimes to get money for drugs, compared to 5% of violent and public order offenders. Among State prisoners in 2004 the pattern was similar, with property (30%) and drug offenders (26%) more likely to commit their crimes for drug money than violent (10%) and public-order offenders (7%). In Federal prisons property offenders (11%) were less than half as likely as drug offenders (25%) to report drug money as a motive in their offenses.

In 2004, 17% of U.S. State prisoners and 18% of Federal inmates said they committed their current offense to obtain money for drugs. These percentages represent a slight increase for Federal prisoners (16% in 1997) and a slight decrease for State prisoners (19% in 1997).

A mid‑year report from the Council on Criminal Justice (CCJ), which tracks crime trends across a sample of large U.S. cities, found that drug‑related offenses rose by 12 percent in the first half of 2026 compared with the same period in 2025.

== Drugs and crime ==
Drug abuse and addiction is associated with drug-related crimes. In the U.S. several jurisdictions have reported that benzodiazepine misuse by criminal detainees has surpassed that of opiates. Patients reporting to two emergency rooms in Canada with violence-related injuries were most often found to be intoxicated with alcohol and were significantly more likely to test positive for benzodiazepines (most commonly temazepam) than other groups of individuals, whereas other drugs were found to be insignificant in relation to violent injuries.

Research carried out on drug-related crime found that drug misuse is associated with various crimes that are in part related to the feelings of invincibility, which can become particularly pronounced with abuse. Problematic crimes associated include shoplifting, property crime, drug dealing, violence and aggression and driving whilst intoxicated. In Scotland among the 71% of suspected criminals testing positive for controlled drugs at the time of their arrest benzodiazepines (over 85% are temazepam cases) are detected more frequently than opiates and are second only to cannabis, which is the most frequently detected drug.

Research carried out by the Australian government found that benzodiazepine users are more likely to be violent, more likely to have been in contact with the police, and more likely to have been charged with criminal behavior than those using opiates. Illicit benzodiazepines mostly originate from medical practitioners but leak onto the illicit scene due to diversion and doctor shopping. Although only a very small number originate from thefts, forged prescriptions, armed robberies, or ram raids, it is most often benzodiazepines, rather than opiates, that are targeted in part because benzodiazepines are not usually locked in vaults and or do not have as strict laws governing prescription and storage of many benzodiazepines. Temazepam accounts for most benzodiazepine sought by forgery of prescriptions and through pharmacy burglary in Australia.

Benzodiazepines have been used as a tool of murder by serial killers, and other murderers, such as those with the condition Munchausen Syndrome by Proxy. Benzodiazepines have also been used to facilitate rape or robbery crimes, and benzodiazepine dependence has been linked to shoplifting due to the fugue state induced by the chronic use of the drug. When benzodiazepines are used for criminal purposes against a victim they are often mixed with food or drink.

Temazepam and midazolam are the most common benzodiazepines used to facilitate date rape. Alprazolam has been abused for the purpose of carrying out acts of incest and for the corruption of adolescent girls. However, alcohol remains the most common drug involved in cases of drug rape. Although benzodiazepines and ethanol are the most frequent drugs used in sexual assaults, GHB is another potential date rape drug that has received increased media focus.

Some benzodiazepines are more associated with crime than others especially when abused or taken in combination with alcohol. The potent benzodiazepine flunitrazepam (Rohypnol), which has strong amnesia-producing effects can cause abusers to become ruthless and also cause feelings of being invincible. This has led to some acts of extreme violence to others, often leaving abusers with no recollection of what they have done in their drug-induced state. It has been proposed that criminal and violent acts brought on by benzodiazepine abuse may be related to lowered serotonin levels via enhanced GABAergic effects.

Flunitrazepam has been implicated as the cause of one serial killer's violent rampage, triggering off extreme aggression with anterograde amnesia. A study on forensic psychiatric patients who had abused flunitrazepam at the time of their crimes found that the patients displayed extreme violence, lacked the ability to think clearly, and experienced a loss of empathy for their victims while under the influence of flunitrazepam, and it was found that the abuse of alcohol or other drugs in combination with flunitrazepam compounded the problem. Their behaviour under the influence of flunitrazepam was in contrast to their normal psychological state.

== Criticisms ==
The concept of drug-related crime has been criticized for being too blunt, especially in its failure to distinguish between three types of crime associated with drugs:

- Use-Related crime: These are crimes that result from or involve individuals who ingest drugs, and who commit crimes as a result of the effect the drug has on their thought processes and behavior.
- Economic-Related crime: These are crimes where an individual commits a crime to fund a drug habit. These include theft and prostitution.
- System-Related crime: These are crimes that result from the structure of the drug system. They include production, manufacture, transportation, and sale of drugs, as well as violence related to the production or sale of drugs, such as a turf war.

Drug-related crime may be used as a justification for prohibition, but, in the case of system-related crime, the acts are only crimes because of prohibition. In addition, some consider even user-related and economic-related aspects of crime as symptomatic of a broader problem.

Harm Reduction Interventions U.S.

Harm reduction interventions in the U.S. are directed at preventing negative health outcomes associated with substance abuse through public health strategies. Strategies include having a wide range of treatment options for different types of drug addiction, preventing overdose and transmission of infectious diseases, and linking individuals to treatment. Access to specific treatments varies from state to state through federal and local policies

U.S. Drug Policy and Legal Framework

Federal drug policy within the U.S. is primarily governed by the Controlled Substances Act of 1970 (CSA). Drugs are placed into five schedules based on the compound’s medical acceptance and potential risk of abuse. Schedule 1 drugs are the most restrictive and have the most severe legal consequences due to their having no medical acceptance and the highest risk of dependence. Conversely, Schedule V drugs are medically accepted and are at the lowest risk of abuse. Enforcement of the CSA is through the investigation of illicit drug trafficking by the Drug Enforcement Administration (DEA). The CSA may be revised because of new medical research or patterns of drug misuse. Some scholars claim that the CSA may restrict public health interventions due to it being too enforcement-focused.

Some public health interventions in the U.S. include medications for opioid-use disorder (MOUD). The three primary medications used in treatment are methadone, buprenorphine, and naltrexone, as they reduce withdrawal symptoms or opioid cravings for those with severe dependence. Methadone distribution is only through mandated attendance at opioid treatment centers. Previously, buprenorphine was subject to the federal X-waiver, which limited the number of patients who could be prescribed it, but it was removed in 2023 through the Consolidated Appropriations Act. Naltrexone requires patients to be fully detoxified before receiving treatment. Complete abstinence from opioids may not be a common goal among users and leads to higher dropout rates.

Overdose prevention centers (OPC) are facilities where individuals can safely use drugs under medical supervision to reduce the risk of overdose. A scoping review found that OPCs not only prevent infection and disease transmission by providing sterile syringes but also do not increase crime in surrounding areas. There are a few functioning OPCs in the U.S., as it violates federal policies of having any designated place to consume drugs.

Pre-exposure Prophylaxis (PrEP) is a prescribed medication used to prevent HIV infection from needle sharing or sex. Some research shows that current prescribing regulations prioritize physicians as the primary providers of PrEP. Nurse practitioners and other providers must prescribe under physician supervision, which may prolong PrEP waitlists. Differences in Medicare coverage across states may also create unequal access to this medication.

U.K. Drug Policy and Legal Framework

In the United Kingdom, the Misuse of Drugs Act of 1971 governs federal drug policy. Controlled substances are divided among 3 classes: A, B, and C. Class A is considered the most harmful and has the strictest penalties. The Misuse of Drugs Regulations of 2001 define lawful access to controlled substances for medical and research purposes. This corresponding act determines the accepted medical use of controlled substances and how they may be prescribed or possessed. The classification system is dependent on patterns of drug use and the latest research.

In the U.K., treatment strategies include opioid substitution treatment (OST), which substitutes illicit opioids with their medicinal counterparts (methadone, buprenorphine). In this program, initial doses of medication are given under supervision, with take-home doses allowed later in treatment. Naloxone is used to reverse opioid overdose and cannot be sold over the counter, but specific drug services can supply it without a prescription. Dihydrocodeine is similar to methadone as it must be prescribed by a specialist, provides relief from withdrawal symptoms, has low potency, and fast-acting results.

Treatment for benzodiazepine dependence is through controlled doses where the patient is under medical supervision. Patients are given diazepam, which is in the class of benzodiazepines, but stays in the system longer and produces therapeutic effects. Concurrent withdrawal is detoxing from two or more substances, and it is avoided in this treatment option due to the increased risk of amplifying withdrawal symptoms.

Harm Reduction and Policy Approaches Recommendations

In the U.S., recommendations from research for improving treatment opportunities include allowing MOUD access beyond specific opioid treatments from the DEA and the Substance Abuse and Mental Health Services Administration (SAMHSA). The incorporation of more OPCs in areas struggling with substance abuse through the revision of the CSA, as it is federally illegal for any designated location for illicit drug use . Allow Medicare to cover preventive care costs and increase federal support for insurance coverage of PrEP.

In the U.K., recommendations from research include that opioid agonist therapy (OAT) be revisited as complementary to the treatment system, and shift emphasis from completion to retention throughout treatment programs (Holland et al. 2022). Increase funding for inpatient detoxification and expand access from local to regional. Increase overdose prevention through harm reduction services such as syringe programs.

== See also ==
- Alcohol-related crime
- Drug abuse
- Drugwipe test
- Intoxication defense
- Self-medication

General:

- Prohibition (drugs)
- Single Convention on Narcotic Drugs

Organized crime:

- Cigarette smuggling
- Drug Cartel
- Drug Lord
- Illegal drug trade
- Organized crime
- Rum-running

US specific:

- Bureau of Justice Statistics
- Bureau of Alcohol, Tobacco, Firearms and Explosives
- Comprehensive Drug Abuse Prevention and Control Act of 1970
- Controlled Substances Act
- Drug Enforcement Administration
- Food and Drug Administration
- Racketeer Influenced and Corrupt Organizations Act (RICO)
- U.S. Immigration and Customs Enforcement
- Uniform Crime Report
