= Nitrazepam =

Benzodiazepine sedative

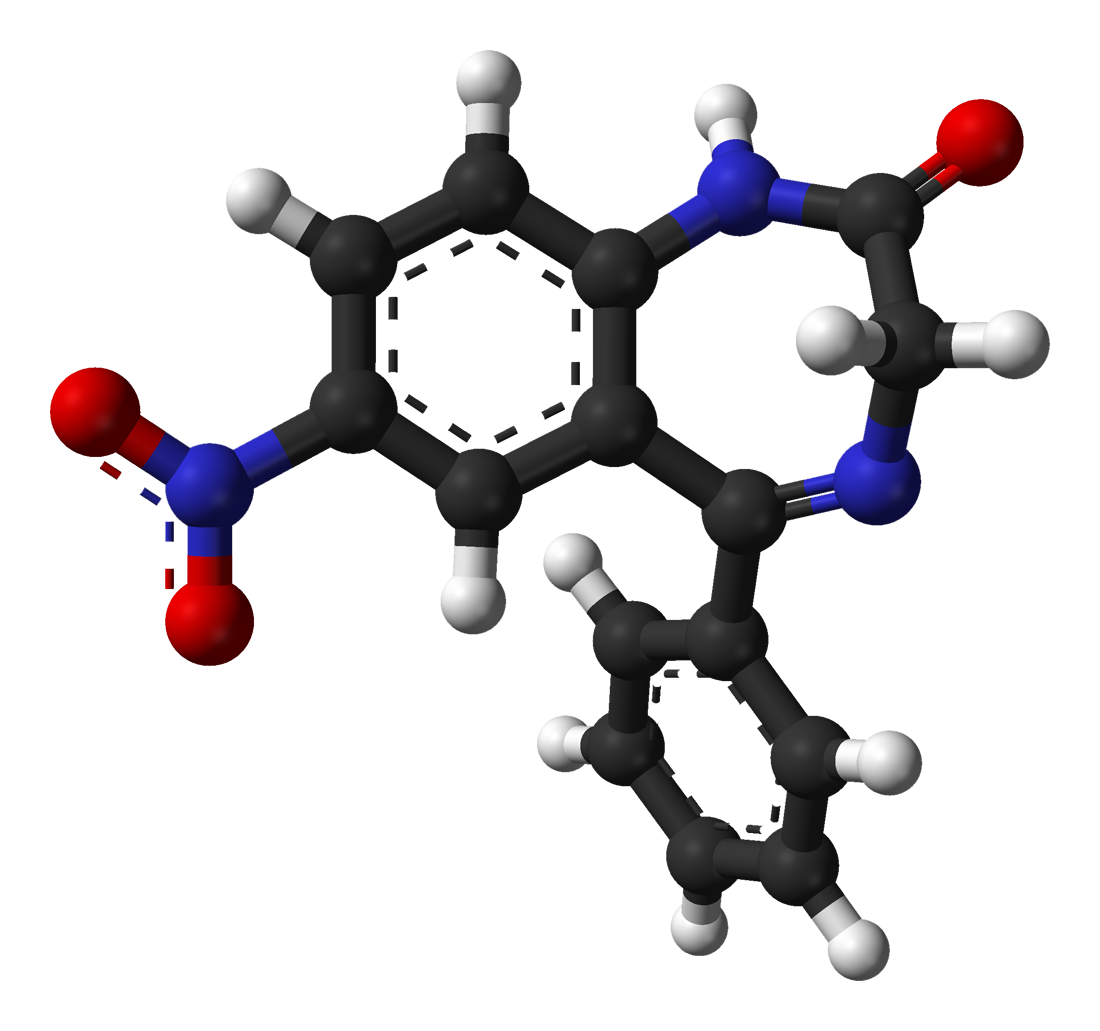

Clinical data
- Trade names: Alodorm, Apodorm, Arem, Cerson, Insoma, Insomin, Mogadon, Nitrados, Nitrazadon, Nitrosun, Nitravet, Ormodon, Paxadorm, Remnos, Epam, and Somnite
- AHFS/Drugs.com: International Drug Names
- Dependence liability: Physical: High Psychological: Moderate
- Addiction liability: Moderate
- Routes of administration: Oral
- ATC code: N05CD02 (WHO)

Legal status
- Legal status: AU: S4 (Prescription only); BR: Class B1 (Psychoactive drugs); CA: Schedule IV; DE: Prescription only (Anlage III for higher doses); UN: Psychotropic Schedule IV; SE: Förteckning IV In general: ℞ (Prescription only)

Pharmacokinetic data
- Bioavailability: 53–94%
- Metabolism: Hepatic
- Elimination half-life: 16–38 hours
- Excretion: Renal

Identifiers
- IUPAC name: 7-nitro-5-phenyl-1H-benzo[e][1,4]diazepin-2(3H)-one
- CAS Number: 146-22-5
- PubChem CID: 4506
- DrugBank: DB01595
- ChemSpider: 4350
- UNII: 9CLV70W7HS
- KEGG: D00531
- ChEBI: CHEBI:7581
- ChEMBL: ChEMBL13209
- CompTox Dashboard (EPA): DTXSID5023372
- ECHA InfoCard: 100.005.151

Chemical and physical data
- Formula: C_{15}H_{11}N_{3}O_{3}
- Molar mass: 281.271 g·mol^{−1}
- 3D model (JSmol): Interactive image
- SMILES: [O-][N+](C1=CC2=C(C=C1)NC(CN=C2C3=CC=CC=C3)=O)=O
- InChI: InChI=1S/C15H11N3O3/c19-14-9-16-15(10-4-2-1-3-5-10)12-8-11(18(20)21)6-7-13(12)17-14/h1-8H,9H2,(H,17,19); Key:KJONHKAYOJNZEC-UHFFFAOYSA-N

Nitrazepam, sold under the brand name Mogadon among others, is a hypnotic drug of the benzodiazepine class used for short-term relief from severe, disabling anxiety and insomnia. It also has sedative (calming) properties, as well as amnestic (inducing forgetfulness), anticonvulsant, and skeletal muscle relaxant effects.

It was first synthesized in the late 1950s by a team of researchers at Hoffmann-La Roche in Switzerland. It was patented in 1961 and came into medical use in 1965.

== Medical use ==
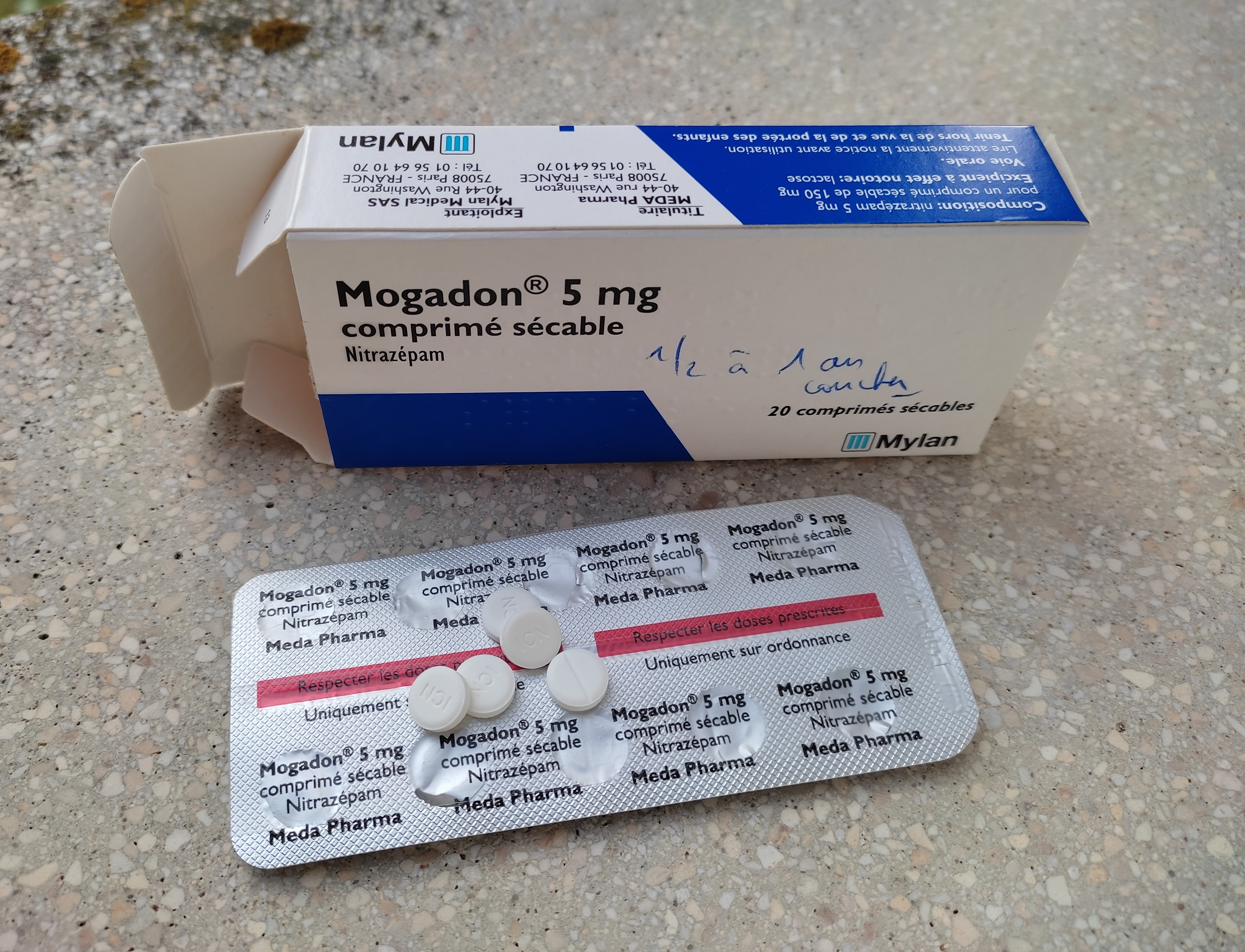
A box of Mogadon pills containing 5mg of Nitrazepam.

Nitrazepam is used to treat short-term sleeping problems (insomnia), namely difficulty falling asleep, frequent awakening, early awakening, or a combination of each.

Nitrazepam is sometimes tried to treat epilepsy when other medications fail. It has been found to be more effective than clonazepam in the treatment of West syndrome, which is an age-dependent epilepsy, affecting the very young. In uncontrolled studies, nitrazepam has shown effectiveness in infantile spasms and is sometimes considered when other anti-seizure drugs have failed. However, drowsiness, hypotonia, and most significantly tolerance to anti-seizure effects typically develop with long-term treatment, generally limiting Nitrazepam to acute seizure management. Nitrazepam can also mitigate effects of alcohol withdrawal.

A light-activated derivative of nitrazepam (fulgazepam) has been developed for research purposes.

== Side effects ==
=== More common ===
More common side effects may include: central nervous system depression, including somnolence, dizziness, depressed mood, fatigue, ataxia, headache, vertigo, impairment of memory, impairment of motor functions, a "hungover" feeling in the morning, slurred speech, decreased physical performance, numbed emotions, reduced alertness, muscle weakness, double vision, and inattention have been reported. Unpleasant dreams and rebound insomnia have also been reported.

Nitrazepam is a long-acting benzodiazepine with an elimination half-life of 15–38 hours (mean elimination half-life 26 hours). Residual "hangover" effects after nighttime administration of nitrazepam such as sleepiness, impaired psychomotor and cognitive functions may persist into the next day, which may impair the ability of users to drive safely and increases the risk of falls and hip fractures.

=== Less common ===
Less common side effects may include: Hypotension, faintness, palpitation, rash or pruritus, gastrointestinal disturbances, and changes in libido are less common. Very infrequently, paradoxical reactions may occur, for example, excitement, stimulation, hallucinations, hyperactivity, and insomnia. Also, depressed or increased dreaming, disorientation, severe sedation, retrograde amnesia, headache, hypothermia, and delirium tremens are reported. Severe liver toxicity has also been reported.

=== Cancer ===
Benzodiazepine use is associated with an increased risk of developing cancer. However, conflicting evidence implies that further research is needed in order to conclude that products of this class really do induce cancer.

=== Mortality ===
Nitrazepam therapy, compared with other drug therapies, increases risk of death when used for intractable epilepsy in an analysis of 302 patients. The risk of death from nitrazepam therapy may be greater in younger patients (children below 3.4 years in the study) with intractable epilepsy. In older children (above 3.4 years), the tendency appears to be reversed in this study. Nitrazepam may cause sudden death in children. It can cause swallowing incoordination, high-peaked esophageal peristalsis, bronchospasm, delayed cricopharyngeal relaxation, and severe respiratory distress necessitating ventilatory support in children. Nitrazepam may promote the development of parasympathetic overactivity or vagotonia, leading to potentially fatal respiratory distress in children.

=== Liver ===
Nitrazepam has been associated with severe hepatic disorders, similar to other nitrobenzodiazepines. Nitrobenzodiazepines such as nitrazepam, nimetazepam, flunitrazepam, and clonazepam are more toxic to the liver than other benzodiazepines as they are metabolically activated by CYP3A4 which can result in cytotoxicity. This activation can lead to the generation of free radicals and oxidation of thiol, as well as covalent binding with endogenous macromolecules; this results, then, in oxidation of cellular components or inhibition of normal cellular function. Metabolism of a nontoxic drug to reactive metabolites has been causally connected with a variety of adverse reactions.

=== Other long-term effects ===
Long-term use of nitrazepam may carry mental and physical health risks, such as the development of cognitive deficits. These adverse effects show improvement after a period of abstinence. Some other sources however seem to indicate that there is no relation between the use of benzodiazepine medication and dementia. Further research is needed in order to assert that this class of medication does really induce cognitive decline.

=== Abuse potential ===
As a depressant, nitrazepam reduces the activity of the central nervous system (CNS). When used in excessive amounts, such as during cases of drug overdoses, nitrazepam can cause CNS depression, and potentially fatal asphyxia.

Recreational use of nitrazepam is common.

A monograph for the drug says: "Treatment with nitrazepam should usually not exceed seven to ten consecutive days. Use for more than two to three consecutive weeks requires complete re-evaluation of the patient. Prescriptions for nitrazepam should be written for short-term use (seven to ten days) and it should not be prescribed in quantities exceeding a one-month supply. Dependence can occur in as little as four weeks."

=== Tolerance ===
Tolerance to nitrazepam's effects often appears with regular use. Increased levels of GABA in cerebral tissue and alterations in the activity state of the serotonergic system occur as a result of nitrazepam tolerance. Tolerance to the sleep-inducing effects of nitrazepam can occur after about seven days; tolerance also frequently occurs to its anticonvulsant effects.

However, other sources indicate that continuous use does not necessarily lead to reduced effectiveness, which implies that tolerance is not automatic and that not all patients exhibit tolerance to the same extent.

==== Dependence and withdrawal ====
Nitrazepam can cause dependence, addiction, and benzodiazepine withdrawal syndrome. Withdrawal from nitrazepam may lead to withdrawal symptoms which are similar to those seen with alcohol and barbiturates. Common withdrawal symptoms include anxiety, insomnia, concentration problems, and fatigue. Discontinuation of nitrazepam produced rebound insomnia after short-term single nightly dose therapy.

== Special precautions ==
Benzodiazepines require special precautions if used in alcohol- or drug-dependent individuals and individuals with comorbid psychiatric disorders. Caution should be exercised in prescribing nitrazepam to anyone who is of working age due to the significant impairment of psychomotor skills; this impairment is greater when the higher dosages are prescribed.

Nitrazepam in doses of 5 mg or more causes significant deterioration in vigilance performance combined with increased feelings of sleepiness. Nitrazepam at doses of 5 mg or higher impairs driving skills and like other hypnotic drugs, it is associated with an increased risk of traffic accidents. In the elderly, nitrazepam is associated with an increased risk of falls and hip fractures due to impairments of body balance. The elimination half-life of nitrazepam is 40 hours in the elderly and 29 hours in younger adults. Nitrazepam is commonly taken in overdose by drug abusers or suicidal individuals, sometimes leading to death. Nitrazepam is teratogenic if taken in overdose during pregnancy with 30% of births showing congenital abnormalities. It is a popular drug of abuse in countries where it is available.

Doses as low as 5 mg can impair driving skills. Therefore, people driving or conducting activities which require vigilance should exercise caution in using nitrazepam or possibly avoid it altogether.

=== Elderly ===
Nitrazepam, similar to other benzodiazepines and nonbenzodiazepines, causes impairments in body balance and standing steadiness in individuals who wake up at night or the next morning. Falls and hip fractures are frequently reported. Combination with alcohol increases these impairments. Partial but incomplete tolerance develops to these impairments. Nitrazepam has been found to be dangerous in elderly patients due to a significantly increased risk of falls. This increased risk is probably due to the drug effects of nitrazepam persisting well into the next day. Nitrazepam is a particularly unsuitable hypnotic for the elderly as it induces a disability characterised by general mental deterioration, inability to walk, incontinence, dysarthria, confusion, stumbling, falls, and disoriention which can occur from doses as low as 5 mg. The nitrazepam-induced symptomatology can lead to a misdiagnosis of brain disease in the elderly, for example dementia, and can also lead to the symptoms of postural hypotension which may also be misdiagnosed. A geriatric unit reportedly was seeing as many as seven patients a month with nitrazepam-induced disabilities and health problems. The drug was recommended to join the barbiturates in not being prescribed to the elderly. Only nitrazepam and lorazepam were found to increase the risk of falls and fractures in the elderly. CNS depression occurs much more frequently in the elderly and is especially common in doses above 5 mg of nitrazepam. Both young and old patients report sleeping better after three nights' use of nitrazepam, but they also reported feeling less awake and were slower on psychomotor testing up to 36 hours after intake of nitrazepam. The elderly showed cognitive deficits, making significantly more mistakes in psychomotor testing than younger patients despite similar plasma levels of the drug, suggesting the elderly are more sensitive to nitrazepam due to increased sensitivity of the aging brain to it. Confusion and disorientation can result from chronic nitrazepam administration to elderly subjects. Also, the effects of a single dose of nitrazepam may last up to 60 hours after administration.

=== Children ===
Nitrazepam is not recommended for use in those under 18 years of age. Use in very young children may be especially dangerous. Children treated with nitrazepam for epilepsies may develop tolerance within months of continued use, with dose escalation often occurring with prolonged use. Sleepiness, deterioration in motor skills and ataxia were common side effects in children with tuberous sclerosis treated with nitrazepam. The side effects of nitrazepam may impair the development of motor and cognitive skills in children treated with nitrazepam. Withdrawal only occasionally resulted in a return of seizures and some children withdrawn from nitrazepam appeared to improve. Development, for example the ability to walk at five years of age, was impaired in many children taking nitrazepam, but was not impaired with several other nonbenzodiazepine antiepileptic agents. Children being treated with nitrazepam have been recommended to be reviewed and have their nitrazepam gradually discontinued whenever appropriate. Excess sedation, hypersalivation, swallowing difficulty, and high incidence of aspiration pneumonia, as well as several deaths, have been associated with nitrazepam therapy in children.

=== Pregnancy ===
Nitrazepam is not recommended during pregnancy as it is associated with causing a neonatal withdrawal syndrome and is not generally recommended in alcohol- or drug-dependent individuals or people with comorbid psychiatric disorders. The Dutch, British and French system called the System of Objectified Judgement Analysis for assessing whether drugs should be included in drug formularies based on clinical efficacy, adverse effects, pharmacokinetic properties, toxicity, and drug interactions was used to assess nitrazepam. A Dutch analysis using the system found nitrazepam to be unsuitable in drug-prescribing formularies.

The use of nitrazepam during pregnancy can lead to intoxication of the newborn. A neonatal withdrawal syndrome can also occur if nitrazepam or other benzodiazepines are used during pregnancy with symptoms such as hyperexcitability, tremor, and gastrointestinal upset (diarrhea or vomiting) occurring. Breast feeding by mothers using nitrazepam is not recommended. Nitrazepam is a long-acting benzodiazepine with a risk of drug accumulation, though no active metabolites are formed during metabolism. Accumulation can occur in various body organs, including the heart; accumulation is even greater in babies. Nitrazepam rapidly crosses the placenta and is present in breast milk in high quantities. Therefore, benzodiazepines including nitrazepam should be avoided during pregnancy. In early pregnancy, nitrazepam levels are lower in the baby than in the mother, and in the later stages of pregnancy, nitrazepam is found in equal levels in both the mother and the unborn child. Internationally benzodiazepines are known to cause harm when used during pregnancy and nitrazepam is a category D drug during pregnancy.

Benzodiazepines are lipophilic and rapidly penetrate membranes, so rapidly penetrate the placenta with significant uptake of the drug. Use of benzodiazepines such as nitrazepam in late pregnancy in especially high doses may result in floppy infant syndrome. Use in the third trimester of pregnancy may result in the development of a severe benzodiazepine withdrawal syndrome in the neonate. Withdrawal symptoms from benzodiazepines in the neonate may include hypotonia, and reluctance to suckle, to apnoeic spells, cyanosis, and impaired metabolic responses to cold stress. These symptoms may persist for hours or months after birth.

=== Other precautions ===
==== Caution in hypotension ====
Caution in those suffering from hypotension, nitrazepam may worsen hypotension.

==== Caution in hypothyroidism ====
Caution should be exercised by people who have hypothyroidism, as this condition may cause a long delay in the metabolism of nitrazepam leading to significant drug accumulation.

== Contraindications ==
Nitrazepam should be avoided in patients with chronic obstructive pulmonary disease (COPD), especially during acute exacerbations of COPD, because serious respiratory depression may occur in patients receiving hypnotics.

As with other hypnotic drugs, nitrazepam is associated with an increased risk of traffic accidents. Nitrazepam is recommended to be avoided in patients who drive or operate machinery. A study assessing driving skills of sedative hypnotic users found the users of nitrazepam to be significantly impaired up to 17 hours after dosing, whereas users of temazepam did not show significant impairments of driving ability. These results reflect the long-acting nature of nitrazepam.

== Interactions ==
Nitrazepam interacts with the antibiotic erythromycin, a strong inhibitor of CYP3A4, which affects concentration peak time. Alone, this interaction is not believed to be clinically important. However, anxiety, tremor, and depression were documented in a case report involving a patient undergoing treatment for acute pneumonia and renal failure. Following administration of nitrazepam, triazolam, and subsequently erythromycin, the patient experienced repetitive hallucinations and abnormal bodily sensations. Coadministration of benzodiazepine drugs at therapeutic doses with erythromycin may cause serious psychotic symptoms, especially in persons with other, significant physical complications.

Oral contraceptive pills reduce the clearance of nitrazepam, which may lead to increased plasma levels of nitrazepam and accumulation. Rifampin significantly increases the clearance of nitrazepam, while probenecid significantly decreases its clearance. Cimetidine slows down the elimination rate of nitrazepam, leading to more prolonged effects and increased risk of accumulation. Alcohol in combination with nitrazepam may cause a synergistic enhancement of the hypotensive properties of both benzodiazepines and alcohol. Benzodiazepines including nitrazepam may inhibit the glucuronidation of morphine, leading to increased levels and prolongation of the effects of morphine in rat experiments.

== Pharmacology ==
Nitrazepam is a nitrobenzodiazepine. It is a 1,4 benzodiazepine, with the chemical name 1,3-Dihydro-7-nitro-5-phenyl-2H-1,4- benzodiazepin-2-one.

It is long acting, lipophilic, and metabolised hepatically by oxidative pathways. It acts on benzodiazepine receptors in the brain which are associated with the GABA receptors, causing an enhanced binding of GABA to GABA_{A} receptors. GABA is a major inhibitory neurotransmitter in the brain, involved in inducing sleepiness, muscular relaxation, and control of anxiety and seizures, and slows down the central nervous system. Nitrazepam is similar in action to the z-drug zopiclone prescribed for insomnia. The anticonvulsant properties of nitrazepam and other benzodiazepines may be in part or entirely due to binding to voltage-dependent sodium channels rather than benzodiazepine receptors. Sustained repetitive firing seems to be limited by benzodiazepines effect of slowing recovery of sodium channels from inactivation in mouse spinal cord cell cultures. The muscle relaxant properties of nitrazepam are produced via inhibition of polysynaptic pathways in the spinal cord of decerebrate cats. It is a full agonist of the benzodiazepine receptor. The endogenous opioid system may play a role in some of the pharmacological properties of nitrazepam in rats. Nitrazepam causes a decrease in the cerebral contents of the amino acids glycine and alanine in the mouse brain. The decrease may be due to activation of benzodiazepine receptors. At high doses decreases in histamine turnover occur as a result of nitrazepam's action at the benzodiazepine-GABA receptor complex in mouse brain. Nitrazepam has demonstrated cortisol-suppressing properties in humans. It is an agonist for both central benzodiazepine receptors and to the peripheral-type benzodiazepine receptors found in rat neuroblastoma cells.

== EEG and sleep ==
In sleep laboratory studies, nitrazepam decreased sleep onset latency. In psychogeriatric inpatients, it was found to be no more effective than placebo tablets in increasing total time spent asleep and to significantly impair trial subjects' abilities to move and carry out everyday activities the next day, and it should not be used as a sleep aid in psychogeriatric inpatients.

The drug causes a delay in the onset, and decrease in the duration of REM sleep. Following discontinuation of the drug, REM sleep rebound has been reported in some studies. Nitrazepam is reported to significantly affect stages of sleep - a decrease in stage 1, 3, and 4 sleep and an increase in stage 2. In young volunteers, the pharmacological properties of nitrazepam were found to produce sedation and impaired psychomotor performance and standing steadiness. EEG tests showed decreased alpha activity and increased the beta activity, according to blood plasma levels of nitrazepam. Performance was significantly impaired 13 hours after dosing with nitrazepam, as were decision-making skills. EEG tests show more drowsiness and light sleep 18 hours after nitrazepam intake, more so than amylobarbitone. Fast activity was recorded via EEG 18 hours after nitrazepam dosing. An animal study demonstrated that nitrazepam induces a drowsy pattern of spontaneous EEG including high-voltage slow waves and spindle bursts increase in the cortex and amygdala, while the hippocampal theta rhythm is desynchronized. Also low-voltage fast waves occur particularly in the cortical EEG. The EEG arousal response to auditory stimulation and to electric stimulation of the mesencephalic reticular formation, posterior hypothalamus and centromedian thalamus is significantly suppressed. The photic driving response elicited by a flash light in the visual cortex is also suppressed by nitrazepam. Estazolam was found to be more potent however. Nitrazepam increases the slow wave light sleep (SWLS) in a dose-dependent manner whilst suppressing deep sleep stages. Less time is spent in stages 3 and 4 which are the deep sleep stages, when benzodiazepines such as nitrazepam are used. The suppression of deep sleep stages by benzodiazepines may be especially problematic to the elderly as they naturally spend less time in the deep sleep stage.

== Pharmacokinetics ==
Nitrazepam is largely bound to plasma proteins. Benzodiazepines such as nitrazepam are lipid-soluble and have a high cerebral uptake. The time for nitrazepam to reach peak plasma concentrations following oral administration is about 2 hours (0.5 to 5 hours). The half-life of nitrazepam is between 16.5 and 48.3 hours. In young people, nitrazepam has a half-life of about 29 hours and a much longer half-life of 40 hours in the elderly. Both low dose (5 mg) and high dose (10 mg) of nitrazepam significantly increases growth hormone levels in humans.

Nitrazepam's half-life in the cerebrospinal fluid, 68 hours, indicates that nitrazepam is eliminated extremely slowly from the cerebrospinal fluid. Concomitant food intake has no influence on the rate of absorption of nitrazepam nor on its bioavailability. Therefore, nitrazepam can be taken with or without food.

== Overdose ==
Nitrazepam overdose may result in stereotypical symptoms of benzodiazepine overdose including intoxication, impaired balance and slurred speech. In cases of severe overdose this may progress to a comatose state with the possibility of death. The risk of nitrazepam overdose is increased significantly if nitrazepam is abused in conjunction with opioids, as was highlighted in a review of deaths of users of the opioid buprenorphine. Nitrobenzodiazepines such as nitrazepam can result in a severe neurological effects. Nitrazepam taken in overdose is associated with a high level of congenital abnormalities (30 percent of births). Most of the congenital abnormalities were mild deformities.

Severe nitrazepam overdose resulting in coma causes the central somatosensory conduction time (CCT) after median nerve stimulation to be prolonged and the N20 to be dispersed. Brain-stem auditory evoked potentials demonstrate delayed interpeak latencies (IPLs) I-III, III-V and I-V. Toxic overdoses therefore of nitrazepam cause prolonged CCT and IPLs. An alpha pattern coma can be a feature of nitrazepam overdose with alpha patterns being most prominent in the frontal and central regions of the brain.

Benzodiazepines were implicated in 39% of suicides by drug poisoning in Sweden, with nitrazepam and flunitrazepam accounting for 90% of benzodiazepine implicated suicides, in the elderly over a period of 2 decades. In three quarters of cases death was due to drowning, typically in the bath. Benzodiazepines were the predominant drug class in suicides in this review of Swedish death certificates. In 72% of the cases benzodiazepines were the only drug consumed. Benzodiazepines and in particular nitrazepam and flunitrazepam should therefore be prescribed with caution in the elderly. In a brain sample of a fatal nitrazepam poisoning high concentrations of nitrazepam and its metabolite were found in the brain of the deceased person.

In a retrospective study of deaths in Sweden, when benzodiazepines were implicated in the deaths, the benzodiazepines nitrazepam and flunitrazepam were the most common benzodiazepines involved. Benzodiazepines were a factor in all deaths related to drug addiction in this study of causes of deaths. In Sweden, nitrazepam and flunitrazepam were significantly more commonly implicated in suicide related deaths than natural deaths. In four of the cases benzodiazepines alone were the only cause of death. In Australia, nitrazepam and temazepam were the benzodiazepines most commonly detected in overdose drug related deaths. In a third of cases benzodiazepines were the sole cause of death.

Individuals with chronic illnesses are much more vulnerable to lethal overdose with nitrazepam, as fatal overdoses can occur at relatively low doses in these individuals.

== Synthesis ==
Reaction of 2-amino-5-nitrobenzophenone (1) with bromoacetyl bromide forms the amide 2. Ring closure in liquid ammonia affords nitrazepam (3). More simply, diazepinone (4) can be nitrated directly at the more reactive C_{7} position with potassium nitrate in sulfuric acid.

Nitrazepam synthesis:

== See also ==
- Benzodiazepine
- Benzodiazepine dependence
- Benzodiazepine withdrawal syndrome
- Long-term effects of benzodiazepines
- Nimetazepam — methylamino derivative of nitrazepam
- Flunitrazepam — fluorinated methylamino derivative
- Clonazepam — chlorinated derivative
- Fulgazepam - light-activated derivative of benzodiazepine based on photoisomerizable fulgimide
