= Vagotonia =

- Other names: Increased parasympathetic tone
- Specialty: Neurology, Cardiology
- Symptoms: Bradycardia, fainting, digestive activation
- Causes: Endurance training, autonomic imbalance
- Differential diagnosis: Sympatheticotonia
- Treatment: Lifestyle adjustment, monitoring
- Frequency: Variable

Vagotonia is the state of the autonomic nervous system in which there is increased parasympathetic input through the vagus nerve, or the equilibrium between the sympathetic and parasympathetic is biased towards the latter. The opposite phenomenon has been referred to as sympatheticotonia.

== Description ==
Increased parasympathetic outflow prominently affects the heart, reducing the heart rate or, in extreme cases, completely halting heart beats. This is a common cause of fainting.

The parasympathetic nervous system is dominant in situations of rest and relaxation, it has an activating effect on digestive organs and a relieving one on the heart. Endurance training increases vagotonia. For example, a low heart rate may be observed with sportsmen.
