= Nimetazepam =

Benzodiazepine medication

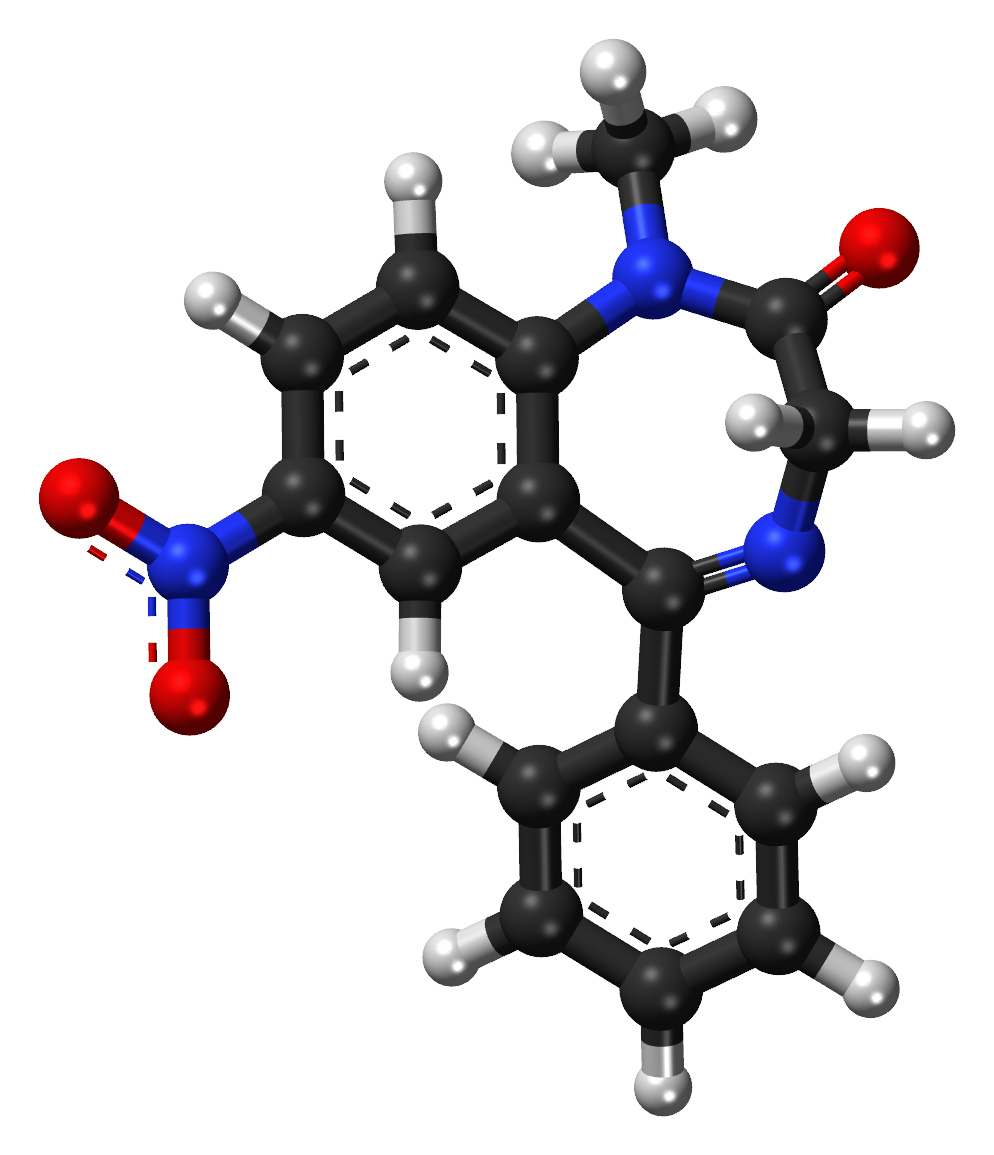

Clinical data
- Trade names: Erimin
- AHFS/Drugs.com: International Drug Names
- Pregnancy category: X
- Routes of administration: By mouth
- ATC code: N05CD15 (WHO)

Legal status
- Legal status: AU: S4 (Prescription only); BR: Class B1 (Psychoactive drugs); CA: Schedule IV; DE: Anlage III (Special prescription form required); US: Schedule IV; UN: Psychotropic Schedule IV

Pharmacokinetic data
- Bioavailability: 95%
- Metabolism: Liver
- Elimination half-life: 14–30 hours
- Excretion: Kidney

Identifiers
- IUPAC name: 1-methyl-7-nitro-5-phenyl-3H-1,4-benzodiazepin-2-one
- CAS Number: 2011-67-8
- PubChem CID: 4496
- ChemSpider: 4340
- UNII: 4532264KW6
- KEGG: D01593
- ChEBI: CHEBI:31912
- ChEMBL: ChEMBL13341
- CompTox Dashboard (EPA): DTXSID6023369
- ECHA InfoCard: 100.016.302

Chemical and physical data
- Formula: C_{16}H_{13}N_{3}O_{3}
- Molar mass: 295.298 g·mol^{−1}
- 3D model (JSmol): Interactive image
- SMILES: [O-][N+](C1=CC2=C(C=C1)N(C)C(CN=C2C3=CC=CC=C3)=O)=O
- InChI: InChI=1S/C16H13N3O3/c1-18-14-8-7-12(19(21)22)9-13(14)16(17-10-15(18)20)11-5-3-2-4-6-11/h2-9H,10H2,1H3; Key:GWUSZQUVEVMBPI-UHFFFAOYSA-N

Nimetazepam (marketed under brand name Erimin and Lavol) is an intermediate-acting hypnotic drug which is a benzodiazepine derivative. It was first synthesized by a team at Hoffmann-La Roche in 1964. It possesses powerful hypnotic, anxiolytic, sedative, and skeletal muscle relaxant properties. Nimetazepam is also a particularly potent anticonvulsant. It was marketed in 5 mg tablets known as Erimin, which is the brand name manufactured and marketed by the large Japanese corporation Sumitomo. Japan was the sole manufacturer of nimetazepam in the world. Outside of Japan, Erimin was available in much of East and Southeast Asia and was widely prescribed for the short-term treatment of severe insomnia in patients who had difficulty falling asleep or maintaining sleep. Sumitomo has ceased manufacturing Erimin since November 2015. It is still available as a generic drug or as Lavol.

Nimetazepam was widely prescribed in the 1980s and 1990s, particularly in Japan, Malaysia, Brunei, the Philippines, Thailand, Indonesia, Hong Kong and Singapore. Prescriptions for the drug have decreased dramatically since 2005 due to rampant misuse and addiction. It is primarily used as an anticonvulsant in children. It is also still used in the most severe and debilitating cases of insomnia in an inpatient setting or in short term outpatient treatment. Hypnotic benzodiazepines estazolam and nitrazepam are used more frequently than nimetazepam for this purpose. Antidepressants such as trazodone and mirtazapine or Z-drugs like zopiclone and zolpidem are first line treatment for insomnia.

Although prescriptions for nimetazepam have decreased, abuse of the drug is still significant in Brunei, Singapore, Malaysia, and the Philippines. It is commonly used in combination with methamphetamine and MDMA (Ecstasy) and opiates (especially heroin or morphine). The strict legal restrictions nimetazepam is subject to in Malaysia has made the drug scarce, but many pills sold as nimetazepam in the black market are counterfeit. Diazepam and nitrazepam are among the most commonly prescribed benzodiazepines in the region, and as a result, they are commonly diverted and sold on the black market, often as nimetazepam.

Illicit manufacturing of nimetazepam (sold as Erimin-5) is prevalent in the region. Abuse of nimetazepam continued to rise throughout the 2010s. Seizures of illicitly manufactured Erimin-5 tablets paralleled the seizures of methamphetamine seizures in Malaysia. A small seizure of 46 illicit Erimin-5 tablets were tested for their physical and chemical characteristics. The active ingredient, adulterant, major diluent, and dyes make up the chemical characteristics of a tablet. The results indicated that nimetazepam was the most common active ingredient in the vast majority of the tablets seized. Lactose was detected as a major diluent in the majority of the samples, followed by mannitol and then calcium phosphate dibasic dihydrate. Sunset yellow was found in most of the tablet samples either alone or in combination with other dyes such as tartrazine and ponceau 4R to give the tablets a peach/orange colour. Green tablets in the samples contained brilliant blue and tartrazine dyes. Diazepam, which is primarily an anxiolytic, was the active ingredient in only one tablet out of the 46. Nitrazepam, a powerful sedative-hypnotic, which is also nimetazepams parent drug, was found to be a minor compound together with a caffeine as a major compound in three of the tablets.

In 2003, 94,200 Erimin-5 tablets were seized in Singapore. The Central Narcotics Bureau's (CNB) laboratory tested the tablets with results that confirmed the tablets were indeed nimetazepam.

== Pharmacokinetics ==
Taken orally, Nimetazepam has very good bioavailability with nearly 100% being absorbed from the gut. It is among the most rapidly absorbed and quickest acting oral benzodiazepines, and hypnotic effects are typically felt within 15–30 minutes after oral ingestion. The blood level decline of the parent drug was biphasic with the short half-life ranging from 0.5–0.7 hours and the terminal half-life from 8 to 26.5 hours (mean 17.25 hours). It is the N-methylated analogue of nitrazepam (Mogadon, Alodorm), to which it is partially metabolized. nitrazepam has a long elimination half-life, so effects of repeated dosage tend to be cumulative.

== Recreational use ==
There is a risk of misuse and dependence in both patients and non-medical users of Nimetazepam. The pharmacological properties of Nimetazepam such as high affinity binding, high potency, being short to intermediate – acting and having a rapid onset of action increase the abuse potential of Nimetazepam. The physical dependence and withdrawal syndrome of Nimetazepam also adds to the addictive nature of Nimetazepam.

Nimetazepam has a particular reputation in South East Asia for recreational use, at around USD 7 per tab, and is particularly popular among persons addicted to amphetamines or opioids. In addition, Nimetazepam has an anti-depressant and muscle relaxant effect. Nimetazepam also has withdrawal suppression effect and lower drug seeking versus nitrazepam in rhesus monkey (Macaca Mulatta). which might help stimulant addicts to overcome withdrawal symptoms.

== Drug misuse ==
Blister packages of Erimin, a discontinued brand for nimetazepam

Nimetazepam has a reputation for being particularly subject to abuse (known as 'Happy 5', sold as an ecstasy replacement without a hangover). Although is still a significant drug of abuse in some Asian countries such as Japan and Malaysia, Nimetazepam is subject to legal restrictions in Malaysia, and due to its scarcity, many tablets sold on the black market are in fact counterfeits containing other benzodiazepines such as diazepam or nitrazepam instead.

== Legal status ==
In the United States, Nimetazepam is categorized Schedule IV FDA and DEA.

Nimetazepam is currently a Schedule IV drug under the international Convention on Psychotropic Substances of 1971.

In Singapore, Nimetazepam is a physician prescribed drug, and is regulated under the Misuse of Drugs Act. The illegal possession or consumption of Nimetazepam is punishable by up to 10 years of imprisonment, a fine of 20,000 Singapore dollars, or both. Importing or exporting nimetazepam is punishable by up to 20 years of imprisonment and/or caning.

In Hong Kong, Nimetazepam is regulated under Schedule 1 of Hong Kong's Chapter 134 Dangerous Drugs Ordinance. Nimetazepam can only be used legally by health professionals and for university research purposes. The substance can be given by pharmacists under a prescription. Anyone who supplies the substance without prescription can be fined $10000 (HKD). The penalty for trafficking or manufacturing the substance is a $5,000,000 (HKD) fine and life imprisonment. Possession of the substance for consumption without license from the Department of Health is illegal with a $1,000,000 (HKD) fine and/or 7 years of jail time.

Similarly in Taiwan and Indonesia Nimetazepam is also regulated as a controlled prescribed substance.

In Victoria Australia, nimetazepam is regulated under Schedule 11 of "Drugs, Poisons and Controlled substances act 1981". It is deemed to fall under the category of "7-NITRO-1,4-BENZODIAZEPINES not included elsewhere in this Part". .

== Toxicity ==
In a rat study Nimetazepam showed greater damage to the fetus, as did nitrazepam when compared against other benzodiazepines, all at a dosage of 100 mg/kg. Diazepam however showed relatively weak fetal toxicities. The same fetotoxicity of nitrazepam could not be observed in mice and is likely due to the particular metabolism of the drug in the rat.

In a rat study nimetazepam showed slight enlargement of the liver and adrenals and atrophy of the testes and ovaries were found in high dose groups of both drugs at the 4th and 12th week, however, in histopathological examination, there were no change in the liver, adrenals and ovaries. Degenerative changes of seminiferous epithelium in the testes were observed, but these atrophic change returned to normal by withdrawal of the drugs for 12 weeks.

== See also ==
- Benzodiazepines
- Flunitrazepam — fluorinated derivative
- Nifoxipam — fluorinated 3-hydroxylated desmethyl derivative
- Nitemazepam — 3-hydroxy derivative
- Nitrazepam — desmethyl derivative
- Temazepam — related hypnotic with similar side effects profile
