= Mark Abie Horowitz =

Australian depression and antidepressant researcher

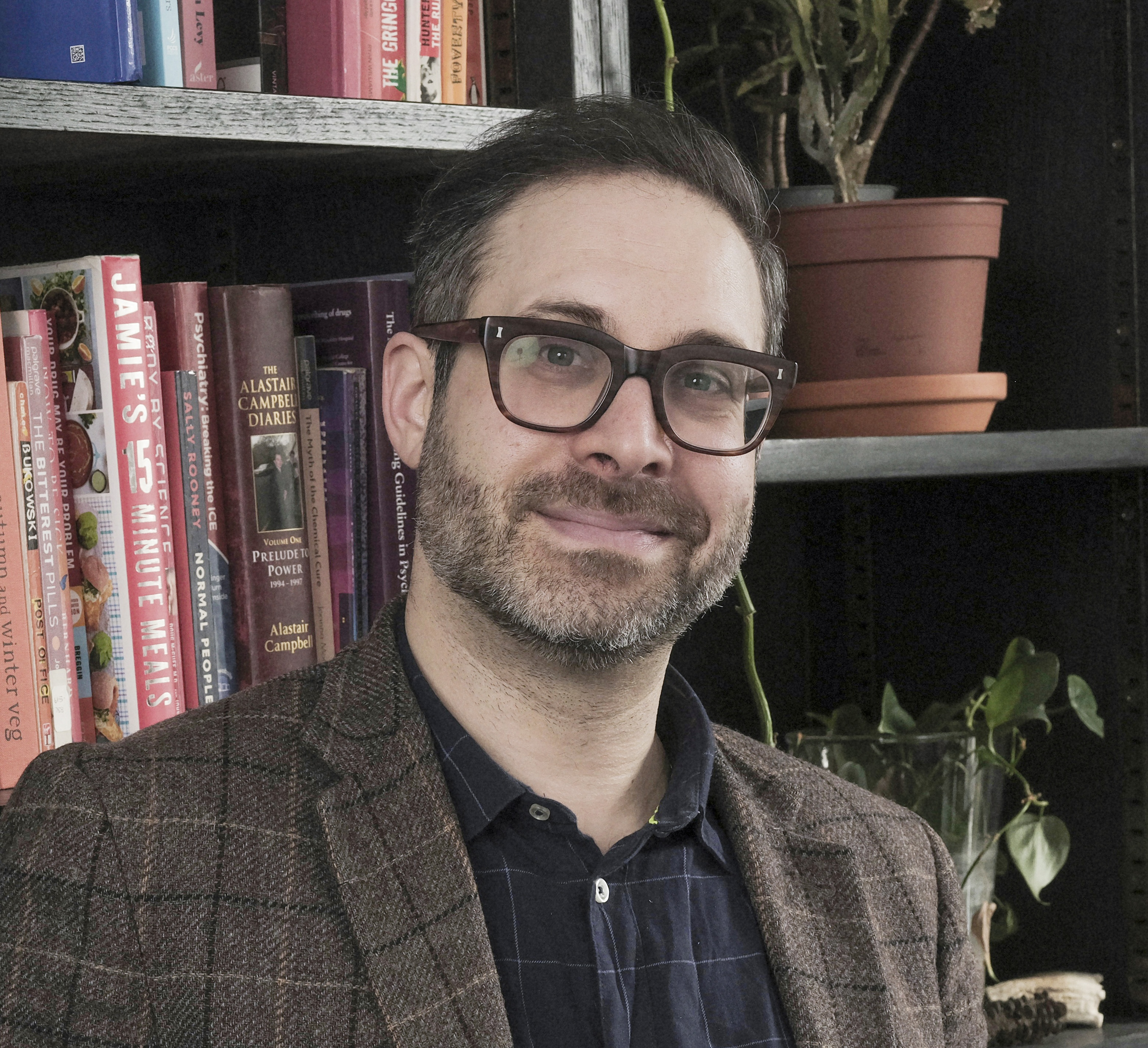
- Education: MBBS, PhD
- Alma mater: King's College London
- Scientific career
- Fields: Psychiatry; Neuroscience; Pharmacology; Depression; Antidepressants
- Institutions: National Health Service
- Website: www.markhorowitz.org

Mark Abie Horowitz is an Australian and British psychiatry researcher and deprescribing expert. He is the lead author of the Maudsley Deprescribing Guidelines, and currently works as a Clinical Research Fellow in psychiatry at North East London NHS Foundation Trust, running a deprescribing clinic. He holds a PhD in the neurobiology of depression and the pharmacology of antidepressants from King's College London.

Horowitz has stated that his career ambitions were influenced by his own experience with having severe withdrawal symptoms when trying to stop his own antidepressants after 15 years of being on them. When trying to wean himself down according to the clinical guidelines at the time, he was blindsided by symptoms so severe they up-ended his life, forcing him to return to his original dose. He and his colleague David Taylor have called for more research to be done on withdrawal and tapering regimens. Horowitz has stated that to him the lack of research on stopping antidepressants is "the same as allowing cars to be sold without brakes".

== Career ==
Illustration of hyperbolic relationship between citalopram dose and SERT occupancy.

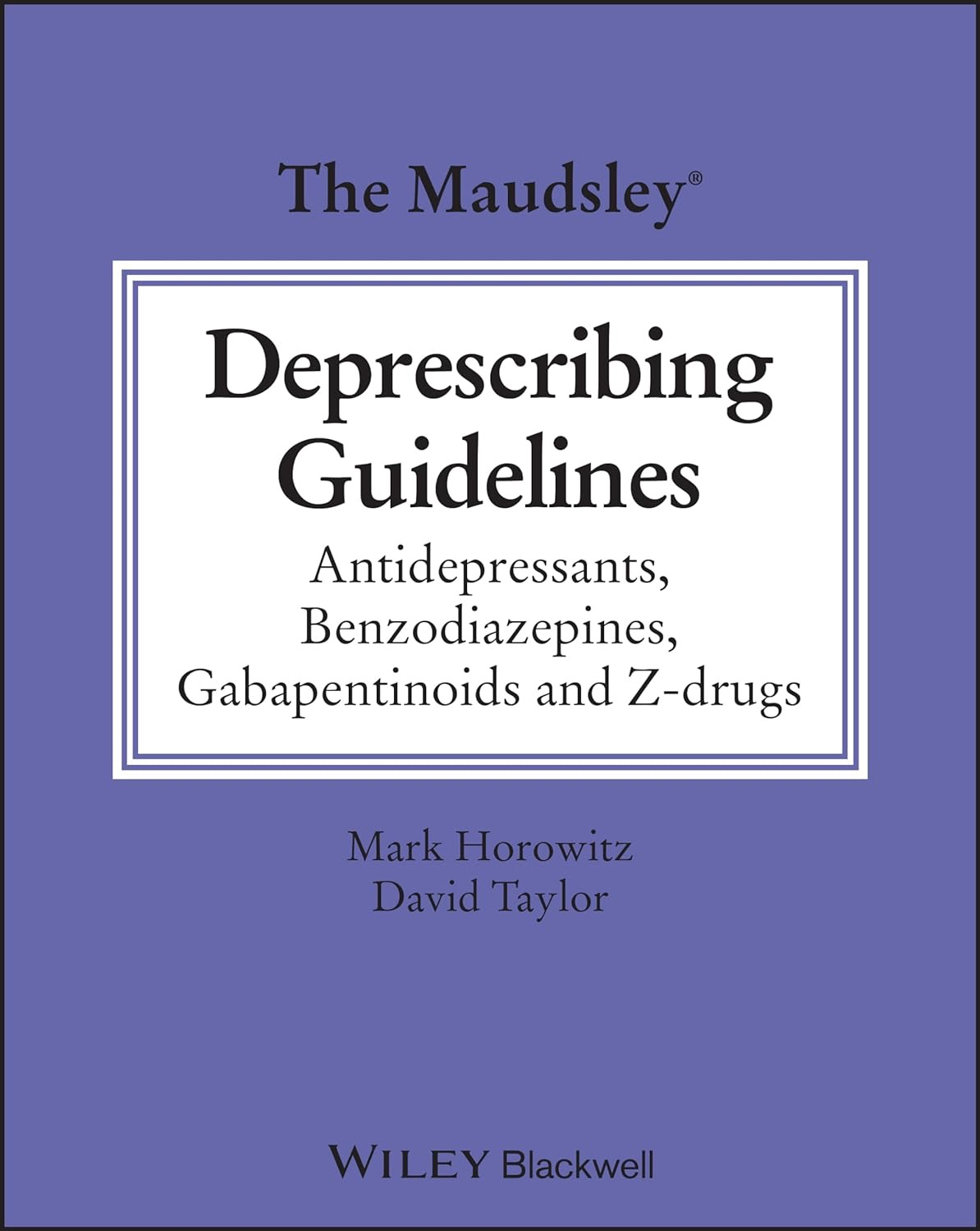
Published in 2024.

In 2019, Horowitz published an analysis of tapering techniques for SSRIs, with the goal of mitigating withdrawal during discontinuation. According to PET imaging, SSRIs have a dose-response relationship with serotonin receptor occupancy which is hyperbolic rather than linear. This means that as the dose of an SSRI increases, the relative increase in effect becomes smaller and smaller. This phenomenon has been known with other drugs such as benzodiazepines; however tapering guidelines for SSRIs at the time had recommended linear dose reductions which make withdrawal reactions more likely at smaller doses. This is because for a fixed dose increment (such as 5 mg), changes at lower doses produce a larger change in receptor occupancy than changes at higher doses. For example, reducing the drug citalopram from 20 mg to 15 mg results in only a 3% absolute decrease in receptor occupancy, but reducing from 5 mg to 0 mg results in a much larger decrease of 58%. The practical implication is that when stopping an SSRI, it needs to be reduced more slowly at smaller doses to prevent withdrawal. Horowitz suggests hyperbolic tapering, where the dose reductions become progressively smaller over time. For citalopram, a hyperbolic tapering regimen of 20 mg, 9.1 mg, 5.4 mg, 3.4 mg, 2.3 mg, 1.5 mg, 0.8 mg, 0.4 mg, then 0 mg translates into an approximate 10% reduction in serotonin receptor occupancy with each dose decrease. This makes the effect on receptor occupancy of each reduction approximately linear rather than becoming increasingly large at smaller doses. Because of differences between individuals, Horowitz also recommends that the tapering process should be personalized to each patient with ongoing monitoring.

In 2020, the Royal College of Psychiatrists published new patient information on stopping antidepressants, co-authored by Horowitz. Also updated in 2024, the guidelines now recommend that somebody who has been taking antidepressants for many months or years should use a slower taper, and a hyperbolic taper is recommended as the slowest tapering plan.

Horowitz set up England's first deprescribing clinic in 2021, along with psychiatrist and professor Joanna Moncrieff.

In 2021, Horowitz published a review of tapering techniques for antipsychotics used in the treatment of schizophrenia, the first ever paper written on the topic. In a way similar to other types of psychiatric medications, dopamine antagonists such as haloperidol also follow a hyperbolic relationship between doses and dopamine receptor occupancy. Based on this, Horowitz and co-authors present hyperbolic tapering as a recommendation for future guidelines on discontinuation, to prevent symptoms like withdrawal-related psychosis and withdrawal dyskinesia. Antipsychotic withdrawal syndrome is hypothesized to be caused by abrupt cessation while dopamine receptors are upregulated (i.e. increased in sensitivity and/or number) as an adaptation to long-term blockage. Slower cessation from a taper is thought to give additional time for this upregulation to resolve. Successful tapering may take months or years in some cases. The paper has been called a 'historic breakthrough' by John Read, a professor at the University of East London. At the time the paper was written, there were no published guidelines on how to stop antipsychotics. A systematic review in 2022 of the need for guideline recommendations on antipsychotic discontinuation also found that "Patients who were gradually weaned off their antipsychotic medication [...] had a much lower risk of experiencing a relapse."

In 2022, Horowitz was a co-author of a systematic umbrella review on the serotonin theory of depression, published in Molecular Psychiatry. The idea that depression results from a chemical imbalance of serotonin is popular and influential, but this review found that "there is no convincing evidence that depression is associated with, or caused by, lower serotonin concentrations or activity".

Along with David Taylor, Horowitz authored the Maudsley Deprescribing Guidelines, a textbook published in 2024. A first of its kind, the deprescribing guidelines are a comprehensive resource on safely reducing or stopping antidepressants, benzodiazepines, gabapentinoids and z-drugs.

Horowitz is the scientific co-founder of Outro Health, a virtual clinic providing antidepressant tapering services, launched in November 2022.

== See also ==
- Tapering (medicine)
- Deprescribing
- Antidepressant discontinuation syndrome
