= Amy Page =

Australian clinical pharmacist

- Born: Australia
- Occupation: Clinical Pharmacist Academic
- Awards: Pharmacist of the Year Young Pharmacist of the Year

Academic background
- Education: Pharmacist; Credentialled Diabetes Educator; Biostatistician
- Alma mater: The University of Western Australia
- Doctoral advisor: Professor Christopher Etherton-Beer, Professor Rhonda Clifford, Dr Kathleen Potter

Academic work
- Discipline: Pharmacist
- Institutions: La Trobe University
- Website: https://scholars.latrobe.edu.au/a2page

Amy Page is an Australian academic and clinical pharmacist who was Australian Pharmacist of the Year in 2024. Page is the Clinical Lead - Pharmacy at La Trobe University.

== Education ==
Page studied health sciences and pharmacy from Charles Sturt University. She then studied at Monash University before completing further clinical qualifications with a Masters of Clinical Pharmacy at the University of Tasmania and a Graduate Certificate in Diabetes Management and Education from Flinders University.

Page received a Doctor of Philosophy in 2017 from The University of Western Australia on deprescribing in older adults under the supervision of Professor Christopher Etherton-Beer, Professor Rhonda Clifford and Dr Kathleen Potter. She holds both a Masters in Health Professional Education and a Graduate Diploma in Biostatistics.

She is a Graduate of the Australian Institute of Company Directors. She credentialled in 2010 through the former Australian Association of Consultant Pharmacy and then in 2014 through the Society of Hospital Pharmacists Australia. She re-credentialled through the Pharmaceutical Society of Australia in 2024 for both Medication Management Reviews and as an Aged Care Onsite Pharmacist. In 2025, she was recognised by the Australian Diabetes Educators Association as a Credentialled Diabetes Educator.

== Career ==
Page has contributed to the profession through senior roles in multiple professional organisations. She was the Chair, Research Leadership Group for the Society of Hospital Pharmacists Australia (now Advanced Pharmacy Australia). She has also served as the state president for the Pharmaceutical Society of Australia. She has been a board member of both the Pharmacy Board of Australia and the Pharmaceutical Society of Australia, and as a councillor for the Australian and New Zealand Council of Pharmacy Schools.

Page has been an instrumental figure in progressing quality use of medicines for allied health professionals. Page has contributed to guidance on prescribing and quality use of medicines for non-medical practitioners. Page has worked on national standards including the NPS Prescribing Competencies version 2, and represented the Pharmacy Board of Australia on the development of the Australian Pharmacy Council's Pharmacist Prescribing accreditation standards. She collaborated with Optometry Australia to develop a Quality Use of Medicines for Optometrists Clinical Practice Guideline. She was an invited speaker at the Physiotherapy Board of Australia's prescribing forum and a member of their working group. Page led work for the pharmacy profession too, having led the Pharmacy Board of Australia's prescribing forum in 2018 that led to the initial statement by the Board that prescribing is within scope for pharmacists, and then the updated statement in 2022. She served on the Department of Health's advisory and clinical reference groups to facilitate the design and implementation of pharmacist prescribing in the jurisdiction.

Page was a member of the working group to develop the Australian Pharmacy Council's Aged Care and Medication Management Review accreditation standards. She consulted on the International Pharmacy Federation's Global Competency Framework.

Page is a regular commentator on medication use in the Australian media particularly on the subject of medication safety for older people.

=== Research ===
Her research relates to medicine safety and the quality use of medicines for older people, particularly those with dementia, chronic diseases or using polypharmacy. She has led work on deprescribing and the quality use of medicines for older people.

=== Teaching ===
Page established and led the development of these six new courses at The University of Western Australia. These courses are the:

- Graduate Certificate in Diabetes Management and Education
- Graduate Certificate in Advanced Medicines Management
- Graduate Certificate in Quality Use of Medicines and Prescribing
- Masters of Advanced Clinical Practice
- Doctor of Pharmacy Practice
- Doctor of Pharmacy Refresher

Page was the Course Director at The University of Western Australia for the first Doctor of Pharmacy Practice qualification for Australian registered pharmacists who wish to upgrade their qualifications.

The Graduate Certificate in Diabetes Management and Education is one of nine courses accredited by the Australian Diabetes Educators Association for initial pathway to becoming a Credentialled Diabetes Educator, and the only one developed in a School of Allied Health.

Page developed a potentially inappropriate medicines list for Australia and the Medication Appropriateness Tool for Comorbid Health Conditions During Dementia. She was co-chair on the Clinical Guidelines for Deprescribing, an evidence-based guideline for medication use in people aged 65 years and over.

=== Clinical Practice ===
Page continues to work in community pharmacy and to undertake Home Medication Reviews (HMRs). She was previously at Alfred Health's Pharmacy Department in Melbourne for four years from 2018 to 2022 as the Lead Pharmacist, Rehabilitation Aged and Community Care. Page was one of the first pharmacists in Australia to work in a general practice, a role she held from 2015 to 2022.

== Awards and recognition ==
The Pharmaceutical Society of Australia selected Page as the Australian Pharmacist of the Year award in 2024. She received the UWA Vice Chancellor's Early Career Researcher Award in 2022 Page was Australian Young Pharmacist of the Year in 2015.

She was also recognised by the Australian Pharmacy Council as an Advanced Practice Pharmacist in the Advanced Practice Pharmacist pilot in 2015.

=== Recognition ===
The Australian Journal of Pharmacy has recognised Page as a leading figure in Australian pharmacy. In 2022, the Journal recognised Page as one of the 12 most influential people in pharmacy. In 2019, Page was listed as one of the most influential people in pharmacy by the Australian Journal of Pharmacy. She had been noted as an "agenda setter" in 2018, and as a "rising star" by the Journal in the previous year.

=== Fellowship ===
Page was elevated to the status of a Fellow of the Pharmaceutical Society of Australia (in 2015) and Advanced Pharmacy Australia (formerly the Society of Hospital Pharmacists Australia) in 2023. In recognition as a strategic leader in education, Page is a Principle Fellow of the Higher Education Academy (PFHEA) with Advance HE.
