= Maudsley Prescribing Guidelines =

The Maudsley Prescribing Guidelines (also known by the abbreviation MPG) is a referenced prescribing guideline for psychotropic drugs.

== History of publication ==
Originally the MPG was produced for local readership in Bethlem Royal Hospital and Maudsley Hospital in London. The 5th edition was the first to be published commercially in 1999 by Martin Dunitz. The 6th (2001) and 7th (2003) were also published by Martin Dunitz. In 2004, Martin Dunitz were subsumed into Taylor and Francis Group and the 8th edition was published under this imprint in 2005. Taylor and Francis then became part of Informa Healthcare who published the 9th edition in 2007 and the 10th edition in 2009. The MPG is revised every two years or so and the 11th edition was published in 2011 by Wiley Blackwell. The 12th edition was published on 17 April 2015 and was available in paperback, as an App and as an e-book. It was edited and written by Professor David Taylor (Maudsley Hospital, UK), Carol Paton (Oxleas Mental Health Trust, UK) and Professor Shitij Kapur (Institute of Psychiatry, Psychology & Neuroscience, UK). Numerous translations have been published. Its guidance was based on primary research, NICE guidance and Cochrane reviews.

The 13th edition was published on 18 May 2018 (in paperback, Kindle and as an App). David Taylor continued as lead author and editor, and was joined by co-authors Thomas Barnes (Imperial College, London) and Allan Young (King's College, London). Japanese and Spanish translations were released in 2019.

The Maudsley Guidelines in Psychiatry 13th Ed is available as an App for all operating systems: https://bookstore.medhand.com/products/the-maudsley-prescribing-guidelines-in-psychiatry.

The 14th Edition was published in June 2021. Italian and Japanese translations followed in 2022. Professor David Taylor continued as lead author and editor.

The 15th edition was published in March 2025.

== Maudsley Deprescribing Guidelines ==
In January 2024, the 1st Edition of the Maudsley Deprescribing Guidelines was published, written by Mark Horowitz and David Taylor. A first of its kind, the deprescribing guidelines are a comprehensive resource on safely reducing or stopping antidepressants, benzodiazepines, gabapentinoids and z-drugs.

== Maudsley Prescribing Guidelines International Conference ==
Attracting delegates from across the world, the Maudsley Prescribing Guidelines International Conference contains the latest evidence-based research and developments in psychiatry. In July 2012, an inaugural conference "Outlining the evidence behind the guidance" was held to celebrate the 11th edition followed by a second conference in September 2014 to launch the 12th edition with the theme "Getting up-to-date: assimilating the latest evidence into practical guidance". Both conferences were attended by over one hundred delegates from around the world and provided the opportunity to hear written guidelines presented by the contributors and to participate in a question and answer session.

The third Maudsley Prescribing Guidelines International Conference "From evidence to practice" was held on Monday 17 December 2018 to celebrate the publication of the 13th edition. Over 200 clinicians attended; more than 50 from outside the UK.

The fourth Maudsley Prescribing Guidelines International Conference Clinical Psychopharmacology in the time of COVID was held remotely on Wednesday 20th October 2021. Coinciding with publication of the 14th edition, the lead editors of the Guidelines and other key contributors, many of them leaders in their fields, have outlined the evidence behind the guidelines.

The fifth Maudsley Prescribing Guidelines International Conference Assuring Evidence-based Prescribing in Mental Illness – the expanding Maudsley Guideline series was held on 10th April 2025 at the Institute of Psychiatry, Psychology and Neuroscience. This was a hybrid event, attended by over 300 delegates..

== The Maudsley Practice Guidelines For Physical Health Conditions in Psychiatry ==
The 1st edition of The Maudsley Practice Guidelines for Physical Health Conditions in Psychiatry was published on 1 October 2020 by Wiley Blackwell (available in paperback). David Taylor, Fiona Gaughran (King's College London), and Toby Pillinger (King's College, London) are co-editors, bringing together contributions from 125 clinicians in the fields of general medicine, surgery, and psychiatry. The text provides evidence-based and practical guidance regarding management of physical health conditions seen commonly in patients with serious mental illness.
