= Hajj cough =

Respiratory tract infection affecting pilgrims

Hajj cough is the informal name for a respiratory tract infection that tends to spread among pilgrims in the crowded conditions of the Islamic pilgrimage to Mecca, known as Hajj. There is much research on the health of the pilgrims before, during, and after their trip, as well as on the causes and remedies of the ailments.

== Pilgrim health throughout Hajj ==
A 2020 study on Australian Hajj pilgrims deduced that of 421 pilgrims surveilled before their trip, 28% reported having already existing health problems, 26 of them were of age 65 or greater, and 103 of them had other chronic problems such as diabetes. 329 obtained recommended vaccines, of which 180 simply got influenza, 139 received that and other vaccines, whereas 10 got a vaccine that was not influenza. Now, when it comes to health during the pilgrimage, 248 of 391 individuals indicated that they had some type of respiratory issues, which included a runny nose, cough, and fever. Finally, after the Hajj pilgrimage, 157 out of 300 pilgrims reported health issues, many of them the similar respiratory issues mentioned above, but also others like diarrhea and influenza-like illness (ILI).

== Causes and symptoms ==
Oversaturation of pilgrims in a confined space greatly increases the likelihood of transmission. A variation of viruses and bacteria cause the cough, one such being the meningococcal strains of 2000/2001, whose associated statistics showed it could easily be transmitted at places where people came together from all over the world.

In terms of the prevalent symptoms, a Malaysian study of 2010 concluded that of a 387-person sample, 91.5% of respondents reported having a cough, 79.3% a runny nose, 59.2% a fever, and 57.1% a sore throat. About 40.1% had all three symptoms.

== Effectiveness of remedial and preventative measures ==
During the pilgrimage, symptoms of upper respiratory tract infections (URTIs) were prevalent amongst the pilgrims. Many physicians assigned to handle the pilgrimage would prescribe antibiotics, and their decisions would be motivated by factors such as clinical assessment, or regulations that they consult. However, a study reports that 45.5% of prescriptions associated with URTIs were unnecessitated, but when a decision was made by a physician to not prescribe, that decision was found to be 95% warranted.

Another remediation is to regularly wash hands and use sanitization, as it helped with reducing influenza-like illness (ILI) symptoms. It is also said that the wearing of protective face masks (in men) lead to only 15% of pilgrims suffering from acute respiratory tract infections (ARI), compared to 31.4% of pilgrims who sometimes wore it, and 61.2% of those that refrained from wearing a face mask at all.
