= NIDS =

NIDS can refer to:

- National Institute for Discovery Science
- Network intrusion detection system, a system that tries to detect malicious activity by monitoring network traffic
- Neuroleptic-induced deficit syndrome, a clinical syndrome that develops in some patients receiving too high doses of an antipsychotic for too long time
- NAS (National Airspace System) Integrated Display System (IDS), a display system used in air traffic control towers and terminal radar approach control
