= Goal-oriented health care =

Form of health care delivery

Goal-oriented health care, also known as goal-directed health care, goal-oriented medical care, and patient priorities care, is a form of health care delivery that is based on achieving individualized goals that are created through collaborative conversations between patients and providers in health care settings. It is a form of Patient Centered Care/Person-Centered Care as the goals are unique to the individual patient and direct the plan of care. This is in contrast to problem-oriented or disease-driven care where the focus is on correcting biological abnormalities (i.e. for a patient with diabetes focusing on control of the hemoglobin A1c). This philosophy of practice is becoming attractive in the medical community especially in primary care practices worldwide.

== Background, history, and definition ==
Goal-oriented care was first suggested in 1991 by James W. Mold, a family physician and geriatrician working at the University of Oklahoma Health Sciences Center in Oklahoma City, Oklahoma, in an article published in the journal, Family Medicine. He proposed that, before considering diagnostic and therapeutic strategies, clinicians and their patients should agree upon their goals. He defined a goal as a desired outcome that is essential to the patient and proposed that four major goal types are relevant to health care: 1) prevention of premature (i.e., preventable) death and disability; 2) maximization of current health-related quality of life; 3) optimization of personal growth and development; and 4) improving the chances of a good death. Goal-directed health care is compatible with a wide variety of clinical strategies, including evidence-based medicine, caring for patients with multimorbidity, patient-centered care, and shared decision making.

== Goal types ==
The clinical methods used to help patients clarify and achieve their health-related goals are different for each goal type though the categories are inter-related. The uniting factor of this conceptual framework is that the goal is formed in a discussion involving both the patient and the health care providers prior to the development of a plan of care that is based upon the patient's goals and priorities, resources and abilities, values and preferences.

=== Prevention of premature death and disability ===
Preventing premature death is a basic tenet of medical and health theory. All human beings want to stay alive as long as possible up to the point when life becomes unbearable, when death becomes a preferable alternative. For each person that point is different and must be determined and reviewed periodically. Preventing premature death and disability can best be accomplished by treating life-threatening conditions and by preferentially implementing preventive strategies with the highest potential impact. A goal-directed approach therefore emphasizes the prioritization of preventive strategies. That process of prioritization includes consideration of all measures that a person might be willing to take to extend their life or prevent disability including primary, secondary, and tertiary preventive strategies.

=== Maximization of current quality of life ===
Health-related quality of life is the ability to participate in both necessary and meaningful activities, defined broadly to include physical, cognitive, and interpersonal activities. The specific components of quality of life for each person are unique, and so measures taken to preserve and enhance quality of life will also differ. This tenet is fundamental to the fields of Occupational Therapy and Sports Medicine and is routinely applied in palliative care, which utilizes a goal directed approach for patients with serious, chronic illnesses that balances prevention of death with optimizing quality of life. Quality of life goals can best be achieved by addressing current obstacles and challenges and by implementing measures to mitigate future obstacles and challenges.

=== Optimization of personal growth and development ===
Growth and development are most often emphasized during childhood. Within the goal-directed health care framework, growth and development are lifelong goals including not only childhood developmental tasks or milestones, but also resilience and coherence throughout life. This requires the provider and patient to discuss personal growth and development goals and consider them when determining a treatment plan.

=== Improving the chances of a good death ===
Making a good death a goal increases the importance of advance directives for all adults. Beyond legal forms, it is also important to help patients document their values and preferences and discuss them with family members and caregivers utilizing prioritization to make sure relevant information is available at the point where critical decisions must be made. Achievement of end-of-life goals depends upon both advance planning and compassionate end-of-life care based upon each person's values and preferences.

== Research in the field ==
A number of articles have been written describing the implementation and potential benefits of various aspects of goal-oriented care and how to integrate it into our health system. Several books have been written to help guide patients and practitioners. Additional information can be found at https://www.goalorientedcare.org.
