= List of long-term side effects of antipsychotics =

This is a general list of long-term side effects associated with Antipsychotic (neuroleptic) medication.

Many patients will not develop these side effects, although there is still a significant possibility of risks associated with antipsychotic usage.

The percentage of patients affected by side effects like Tardive dyskinesia is significantly high and estimated to be a 20-50% prevalence.

These side effects are serious and some of them are permanent, and many remain a crucial concern for companies and healthcare professionals and substantial efforts are being encouraged to reduce the potential risks for future antipsychotics through more clinical trials and drug development. Much is still being discovered about long term side- effects and insufficient research has been done to verify the mechanistic causes and severity of these long term side-effects

Overprescription of antipsychotics among seniors with dementia is evident in spite of side effects.

== List of potential long-term side effects ==
- Alzheimer's disease,
- Akathisia
- Anhedonia
- Anxiety
- Cerebral atrophy
- Cognitive dysfunction
- Early dementia and dementia
- Dementia worsening
- Diabetes
- Gynecomastia
- Hyperglycemia
- Hyperprolactinemia causes impotence in males.
- Hyponatremia low sodium blood levels.
- Metabolic syndrome
- Neuroleptic-induced deficit syndrome
- Neuroleptic malignant syndrome
- Oculogyric crisis
- Parkinsonism
- Somnolence
- Tardive dyskinesia
- Weight gain

There has been a study that suggests antipsychotics are associated with possible cortical reconfiguration and gray matter loss, but correlational data also suggests patients who consume antipsychotics, like people with schizophrenia, tend to engage in unhealthy habits like smoking which may exacerbate gray matter loss.

There are very few studies on healthy controls. There are also few studies of long term effects on animal controls. There are no studies on the long-term effects of polypharmacy (prescribing more than one anti-psychotic at a time), although the practice has been widespread.

== See also ==
- Antipsychotic
- Psychiatry
- Anti-psychiatry
