= Dosmatic U.S.A. =

Dosmatic U.S.A., Inc. (also known as Dosmatic) was a Texas-based company which manufactures dosing pumps, fertigators, medicators and chemical injectors.

Dosmatic U.S.A. International, Inc. was founded in 1981 by Frank Walton as a small sales company for chemical injectors. Dosmatic has been the provider to OEMs, distributors and service centers throughout the world.

Dosmatic grew from its headquarters in Carrollton, to offices in France, Belgium, Thailand, Japan, Australia and Argentina. The company exported products to over 70 countries worldwide. Additionally, Dosmatic had a worldwide network of over 500 distributors and regional service centers.

In 2011, Dosmatic was purchased by Hydro Systems Co. Inc. a division of Dover Corporation. Hydro is the world's largest independent manufacturer of chemical injecting, proportioning, dispensing equipment serving the janitorial, institutional, food service, commercial cleaning, industrial, automotive care markets, animal health and water treatment markets.
