= Mark Horowitz =

Mark Horowitz may refer to:

- Mark Alan Horowitz, American electrical engineer and computer scientist at Stanford University
- Mark Abie Horowitz, Australian and British depression and antidepressant researcher
- Mark Horowitz (director), American television producer and director

== See also ==
- Marc Horowitz, American artist
