= Overmedication =

Excessive drug dosing

Overmedication describes the excessive use of over-the-counter or prescription medicines for a person. Overmedication can have harmful effects, such as non-adherence or interactions with multiple prescription drugs.

== Over-the-counter medication overuse ==
Over-the-counter (OTC) medications are generally first-line therapies that people may choose to treat common acute illnesses, such as fevers, colds, allergies, headaches, or other pain. Many of these medications can be bought in retail pharmacies or grocery stores without a prescription. OTC medication overuse is most prevalent in adolescents and young adults. This overuse is common due to the relatively low cost, widespread availability, low perceived dangers, and internet culture associated with OTC medications. OTC medications may be combination formulations that contain multiple drugs. These combination formulations are often used with other substances, which complicates treatment for these types of overdoses. Furthermore, the easy access to information online can sometimes lead to self-diagnosis and self-medication, contributing to the potential for misuse and overuse.

=== Acetaminophen ===
Overuse of acetaminophen is the leading cause of liver failure in the Western world. The maximum daily limit of acetaminophen is 4 grams per day for someone with a healthy liver. It is also highly recommended to not go over the maximum daily limit. Exceeding the maximum daily limit could involve severe liver toxicity, liver failure, kidney failure, or even death. People who have poor liver function or with chronic alcohol use disorder should either limit or not ingest acetaminophen to prevent morbidities. Additionally, acetaminophen is an ingredient in many combination medications, increasing the risk of unintentional overdose. Consumers should read labels carefully and consult healthcare providers to ensure they are not consuming excessive doses. In cases of suspected overdose, immediate medical attention is needed to mitigate potential life-threatening consequences.

=== Codeine ===
Codeine is an opioid and shares similarities to other opioid overuse. Many OTC medications for cough have formulations that contain codeine, which people may seek to overuse. The common effects of codeine include miosis, respiratory depression, CNS depression, and decreased bowel motility. Despite the risk of death, dependence is another significant issue related to codeine overuse. Tolerance can cause users to use more opioid, leading to dependence, especially with chronic daily use of codeine. Additionally, the misuse of codeine-containing cough syrups has become a public health concern, as it can serve as a gateway to stronger opioids. Education about the risks and signs of opioid addiction can play a role in prevention and early intervention.

=== Dextromethorphan ===
Dextromethorphan, also shortened to DXM, affects the NMDA receptor and serotonin receptors which is believed to give its psychoactive effects at high doses. Similarly to codeine, DXM comes primarily in formulations that contain other OTC medications and is not common to find DXM on its own. Moreso, people who use DXM tend to use it concomitantly with other substances such as alcohol, hallucinogens, sedative drugs, and opioids. DXM has dose dependent psychoactive effects with lower dose leading to more restlessness and euphoria and higher doses causing hallucinations, delusional beliefs, paranoia, perceptual distortions, ataxia, and out of body experiences.

=== Diphenhydramine ===
Diphenhydramine is typically used for allergy relief, although it may be used to alleviate sleeping problems, anxiety, and overall restlessness. Effects may include euphoria, hallucinations, or psychosis. The anticholinergic activity of diphenhydramine may lead to tachycardia, dry mouth, blurred vision, mydriasis, depression, and urinary retention.

In 2020, purposeful overmedication with Benadryl (diphenhydramine) was a concern due to use of social media by teenagers in the United States, with the FDA issuing a public warning about the possibility of seizures, hallucinations, breathing difficulty or loss of consciousness.

=== Pseudoephedrine ===
Pseudoephedrine, ephedrine or phenylpropanolamine can be overused with the intent for weight loss or improving athletic performance, possibly causing insomnia, diminished sense of fatigue, euphoria, and psychotic behavior. The habitual use of the medication has led to dependence, with symptoms of restlessness, dysphoria, and distorted perceptions on withdrawal.

== Elderly ==
Seniors (65 years old and up) are possible users of overmedication. Seniors are disproportionately affected by not only adverse drug events, but also drug interactions and more hospital admissions.

The term for individuals taking five or more medications is polypharmacy, which commonly occurs in elderly people, increasing their risk of overmedication. Medical providers are generally hesitant to prescribe polypharmacy in the elderly due to the risk of harmful drug interactions. Concerns with polypharmacy and elderly groups are reduced medication adherence, increased fall risk, cognitive function impairment, and adverse drug reaction. Almost 75% of clinic visits result in people obtaining a written prescription.

More careful prescribing practices could increase medication adherence in elderly people. Single-pill combination formulations make it easier for a person to monitor medications.

== Overprescription ==
=== Opioids ===
Opioids are used for pain management acutely or prescribed after a surgical procedure. While opioids aid in short- and long-term pain management, overprescription or constant opioid-exposure increases the risk for addiction. There is a rise within healthcare systems to manage prescription of opioids. Children prescribed opioids may become susceptible to the harms of addiction.

Reducing or withdrawing prescribed opioids, such as for people with chronic non-cancerous pain, using either dose-reduction or stopping opioid prescriptions, may be effective, but standards are absent for managing withdrawal symptoms and deprescribing coprescription of sedatives. Studies found a significant increase in opioid surplus disposal when individuals were provided with the necessary education or disposal kits.

=== Antibiotics ===
As antibiotics inhibit bacterial infections, they are a commonly prescribed medication. Overuse of these medications over the years has contributed to reduced efficacy against certain bacteria due to antimicrobial resistance, a global medical concern. Antibiotic overprescription is a potential problem in acute care, primary hospitals, and dental offices.

Antibiotic-resistant bacterial infections are increasing. A systemic review of admitted COVID-19 patients who were prescribed antibiotics showed that 80% of the admitted people were given antibiotics upon admission without confirmed bacterial coinfections.

Physicians prescribe antibiotics for non-indicated diagnoses, such as viral infections, possibly contributing to more antibiotic-resistant infections, greater adverse drug events, more drug-drug interactions, and deaths. Dentists may prescribe antibiotics for non-indicated conditions that could otherwise be treated with other interventions, according to clinical guidelines.

== See also ==
- Polypharmacy
- Deprescribing
- Medication discontinuation
- Tapering (medicine)
