= Mark H. Beers =

American physician

- Born: 1954; Brooklyn, New York
- Died: February 28, 2009 (aged 54–55); Miami Beach, Florida
- Education: Tufts University
- Known for: Beers criteria
- Scientific career
- Fields: Geriatrician
- Workplaces: University of California, Los Angeles

Mark Howard Beers (April 21, 1954 – February 28, 2009) was an American geriatrician whose research on drug interactions among the elderly led to the creation of the eponymous Beers criteria, which lists prescription medications that may have deleterious side effects in older patients.

== Biography ==
Born in Brooklyn, New York, Beers graduated from Tufts University and was awarded a degree in medicine in 1982 from the University of Vermont College of Medicine, and then performed his postgraduate medical training at Harvard University and Mount Sinai Hospital in New York City. He was appointed to the faculty of the University of California, Los Angeles, in 1987 as assistant professor of medicine and also served at the RAND Corporation from 1989 to 1992 as a senior natural scientist.

=== Beers criteria ===
Beers led a team from Harvard University that studied 850 residents of Boston-area nursing homes, looking at the medications they were prescribed and their case histories. The research, published in the Journal of the American Medical Association in 1988, found that many had symptoms of mental confusion and tremors associated with use of antidepressants, antipsychotics and sedatives that they had been prescribed.

Using this research as a foundation, Beers prepared a list in 1991 called Beers criteria that specifies several groups of medications that can cause harm in elderly patients, such as antihistamines and muscle relaxants, with the list updated again in 2003. Medical professionals use this list in selecting medications for their patients though the list has never been clinically validated, and a 2007 study showed that Beers criteria medications caused low numbers of and few risks for emergency department visits for adverse events.

=== Merck Manuals ===
Beers was named as associate editor of Merck Manual of Diagnosis and Therapy, a reference book for medical professionals published by Merck & Co., and co-edited The Merck Manual of Geriatrics. He edited the 2003 edition of the Merck Manual of Medical Information: Home Edition, which was designed for use by laypeople. In a review in The New York Times, Jane Brody said the book "could well be the most useful of all" of the plethora of medical guides aimed at the general public.

His performance deteriorated over years due to vascular dementia attributable to diabetes and he resigned as editor in chief of The Merck Manuals in 2006 due to disability.

=== Personal life ===
Beers was diagnosed with diabetes as a child. Both of his legs were amputated in the 1990s, after which he served as a volunteer counselor for amputees at Philadelphia's Magee Rehabilitation Hospital.

Beers had lived in Miami Beach and Fire Island, New York. He died at age 54 on February 28, 2009, in Miami Beach, Florida, due to complications of diabetes and was survived by his husband, Stephen K. Urice, as well as by his mother and a sister.
