= Neuroleptic-induced deficit syndrome =

Psychopathological syndrome caused by overdose of antipsychotics

Neuroleptic-induced deficit syndrome (NIDS) is a psychopathological syndrome that develops in some patients who take high doses of a neuroleptic (antipsychotic) drug for an extended time. It is most often caused by high-potency typical antipsychotics, but can also be caused by high doses of many atypicals, especially those closer in profile to typical ones (that have higher D_{2} dopamine receptor affinity and relatively low 5-HT_{2} serotonin receptor binding affinity), like paliperidone and amisulpride.

In 2016, researchers from Nippon Medical School in Tokyo noted that the concept of NIDS appeared "almost forgotten in current psychiatry" and called for a reappraisal of antipsychotic drugs and NIDS.

== Symptoms ==
Neuroleptic-induced deficit syndrome is principally characterized by the same symptoms that constitute the negative symptoms of schizophrenia: emotional blunting, apathy, hypobulia, anhedonia, indifference, difficulty or total inability in thinking, difficulty or total inability in concentrating, lack of initiative, attention deficits, and desocialization. There are significant difficulties in the differential diagnosis of primary negative symptoms and neuroleptic deficiency syndrome (secondary negative symptoms), as well as depression. This can easily lead to misdiagnosis and mistreatment. Instead of decreasing the antipsychotic, the doctor may increase their dose to try to "improve" what they perceive to be negative symptoms of schizophrenia, rather than antipsychotic side effects—i.e., "prescribing cascade". The concept of neuroleptic-induced deficit syndrome was initially presented for schizophrenia, and it has rarely been associated in other mental disorders. In recent years, atypical neuroleptics are being more often managed to patients with bipolar disorder, so some studies about neuroleptic-induced deficit syndrome in bipolar disorder patients are now available.

Antipsychotic drugs are strongly associated with sexual dysfunction, including reduced libido, erectile dysfunction, and impaired orgasm. Although not discussed in the early descriptions of neuroleptic-induced deficit syndrome (NIDS), this is likely due to the limited development of the concept rather than a deliberate exclusion. The NIDS construct was proposed in 1993 but was not subsequently validated or expanded, leaving its boundaries undefined.

== History ==
Before the term NIDS was coined, the cluster of signs and symptoms was described using various labels such as "drug-induced akinesia", "neuroleptic dysphoria", "neuroleptic-induced anhedonia" and "pharmacogenic depression". Arthur Rifkin and his colleagues systematically described the key symptoms now associated with NIDS in their 1975 paper "Akinesia: A Poorly Recognized Drug-Induced Extrapyramidal Behavioral Disorder", writing: "We consider akinesia to be a common but subtle toxic effect of antipsychotic medication that is often difficult to distinguish from either residual schizophrenia, depression, or demoralization. Its precise incidence is now the subject of a controlled, double-blind study." Their paper presented eight case histories and concluded:

"We urge physicians to be more aware of this condition. Unfortunately, investigators suggesting that prophylactic antiparkinson medication is unnecessary have not looked for akinesia as we described it. We therefore question their conclusion. Also, since these studies were conducted on patients with chronic conditions, the developing akinesia could easily be attributed to a defect state. In our experience, akinesia can be the only manifestation of EPS [extrapyramidal side-effects] and is common in patients receiving antipsychotic drugs."

The clinical description of akinesia as a behavioral side effect was further developed by Theodore van Putten and colleagues. In 1974, van Putten first described a dysphoric response to neuroleptic drugs, finding it closely associated with extrapyramidal side effects and a predictor of drug refusal and non-compliance. In a separate 1974 paper with Mutalipassi and Malkin, he described adverse behavioral reactions to phenothiazines that mimicked or exacerbated psychosis, sometimes leading to inappropriate increases in neuroleptic dosage. In 1978, van Putten and May further described "akinetic depression" in schizophrenia, highlighting the difficulty of distinguishing drug-induced akinesia from postpsychotic depression. These clinical descriptions were later synthesized in the 1987 review by van Putten and Stephen R. Marder, "Behavioral toxicity of antipsychotic drugs," which characterized akinesia as "a behavioral state of diminished motoric and psychic spontaneity that is difficult to distinguish from the negative symptoms of schizophrenia." The review noted that the most useful clinical correlates of akinesia are a subjective sense of sedation and excessive sleeping, and that the condition could interfere with social adjustment and manifest as "postpsychotic depression." They also emphasized that extrapyramidal symptoms "cause much misery, often go undiagnosed, and can interfere with treatment and rehabilitation."

The specific term "neuroleptic-induced deficit syndrome" was born from an international meeting of psychiatrists and psychologists in 1993 chaired by Malcolm Lader. The proceedings of the 1993 Paris meeting (the "First International Meeting on Neuroleptic Induced Deficit Syndrome") were published in 1994 as a supplement to the journal Acta Psychiatrica Scandinavica. The 85-page supplement includes the peer-reviewed papers presented at the meeting, including contributions from Tommy Lewander, Nina Schooler, Marjorie Wallace and other researchers. A 1995 Polish review article by T. Szafrański explicitly states: "For the drug-related impairment... the name of neuroleptic-induced deficit syndrome (NIDS) is proposed", which supports that the term was formally entering medical literature in the mid-1990s.

With the heavy marketing of second-generation antipsychotics (starting in the mid-to-late 1990s) as having fewer extrapyramidal side effects and less "cognitive dulling" than older neuroleptics, the pharmaceutical industry had no incentive to fund research into a syndrome implying their products caused cognitive harm, and the primary research funding shifted toward studying the "deficit symptoms" of schizophrenia itself, now broadly known as Cognitive Impairment Associated with Schizophrenia (CIAS), rather than the drug side effects, e.g. the 2002 NIMH-funded MATRICS initiative, specifically launched to develop treatments for CIAS. Many clinicians believed (incorrectly, as later evidence showed) that NIDS was mostly a problem of the older drugs. As a result, NIDS research from the 1993–1994 period waned, the specific term "NIDS" fell out of favor because it implied the drug was responsible for a "deficit" that, it was argued, could be part of the underlying disease itself, and the research program was largely abandoned.

In 2016, researchers from Nippon Medical School in Tokyo noted that the concept of NIDS appeared "almost forgotten" and called for its reappraisal, writing:

"As long as antipsychotics are clinically used, whether typical or atypical, the recognition and differentiation of deficit status is needed for the treatment of bipolar disorder as well as schizophrenia. When taking this problem into consideration, it is clear that NIDS is becoming an increasingly important issue in pharmacotherapy. The authors believe that its concept should be reappraised in current clinical psychiatry."

== Cases ==
A Japanese man, who was being treated for schizophrenia, exhibited neuroleptic-induced deficit syndrome and obsessive–compulsive symptoms. His symptoms were remarkably improved by quitting a course of antipsychotics followed by the introduction of the antidepressant fluvoxamine. He had been misdiagnosed with schizophrenia, the real diagnosis was obsessive–compulsive disorder.

From June 2023 to April 2024, Serbian television presenter Bojana Nikolić Janković, known for hosting the show City, posted to the internet forum Bluelight that she was bedridden with anhedonia, cognitive issues, low energy and other symptoms consistent with neuroleptic-induced deficit syndrome after receiving six depot injections of paliperidone palmitate. She wrote: "My main problem is 0 motivation, low energy and anhedonia. Also i have cognitive issues. Beddriden mostly..." The injections were prescribed by her private psychiatrist and friend around the time of her divorce from Ognjen Janković, a member of the hip-hop group Beogradski Sindikat. She died by suicide in Belgrade on April 19, 2024, aged 46.

== See also ==
- Disorders of diminished motivation
- List of long-term side effects of antipsychotics
- Parkinsonism
