= Drug titration =

Process of adjusting the dose of a medication

Therapeutic (green) and side effect dose response curves (red) illustrating a typical starting and progressively increasing titrated doses (arrows).

Drug titration is the process of adjusting the dose of a medication for the maximum benefit without adverse effects.

When a drug has a narrow therapeutic index, titration is especially important, because the range between the dose at which a drug is effective and the dose at which side effects occur is small. Some examples of the types of drugs commonly requiring titration include insulin, anticonvulsants, blood thinners, anti-depressants, and sedatives.

Titrating off of a medication instead of stopping abruptly is recommended in some situations. Glucocorticoids should be tapered after extended use to avoid adrenal insufficiency.

Drug titration is also used in phase I of clinical trials. The experimental drug is given in increasing dosages until side effects become intolerable. A clinical trial in which a suitable dose is found is called a dose-ranging study.

== See also ==
- Therapeutic drug monitoring
- Pituri – chewed as a stimulant (or, after extended use, a depressant) by Aboriginal Australians
