= Multimorbidity =

Concept in health research

Multimorbidity, also known as multiple long-term conditions (MLTC), means living with two or more chronic illnesses. For example, a person could have diabetes, heart disease and depression at the same time. Multimorbidity can have a significant impact on people's health and wellbeing. It also poses a complex challenge to healthcare systems which are traditionally focused on individual diseases. Multiple long-term conditions can affect people of any age, but they are more common in older age, affecting more than half of people over 65 years old.

== Definition ==
The concept of multiple long-term conditions is not clearly defined and may be referred to by various names.

=== Difference from comorbidity ===
Multimorbidity is often referred to as comorbidity even though the two are considered distinct clinical scenarios.

Comorbidity means that one 'index' condition is the focus of attention, and others are viewed in relation to this. In contrast, multimorbidity describes someone having two or more long-term (chronic) conditions without any of them holding priority over the others. This distinction is important in how the healthcare system treats people and helps making clear the specific settings in which the use of one or the other term can be preferred. Multimorbidity offers a more general and person-centered concept that allows focusing on all of the patient's symptoms and providing a more holistic care. In other settings, for example in pharmaceutical research, comorbidity might often be the more useful term to use.

=== Definitions ===
The broad definition of multimorbidity, consistent with what is used by most researchers, the WHO and the UK's Academy of Medical Sciences is the "co-existence of two or more chronic conditions". These can be physical non-communicable diseases, infectious and mental health conditions in any possible combinations and they may or may not interact with each other. When the co-existing conditions have similar origins or treatments the terms used is concordant multimorbidity, while discordant multimorbidity is used to refer to conditions that appear to be unrelated to each other.

Definitions of multimorbidity usually differ in the minimum number of concurrent conditions they require (most often this is two or more) and in the types of conditions they consider. For example the UK's National Institute for Health and Care Excellence (NICE) includes alcohol and substance misuse in their list of conditions considered to constitute multimorbidity.

=== Naming ===
The most commonly used term to describe the concept is multimorbidity. However, scientific literature shows a diverse range of terms used with the same meaning. These include comorbidity, polymorbidity, polypathology, pluripathology, multipathology, multicondition.

The UK's National Institute for Health and Care Research (NIHR) uses the term multiple long-term conditions (MLTC) as it is more accepted and understood by patients and the public.

== Causes ==
=== Risk factors ===
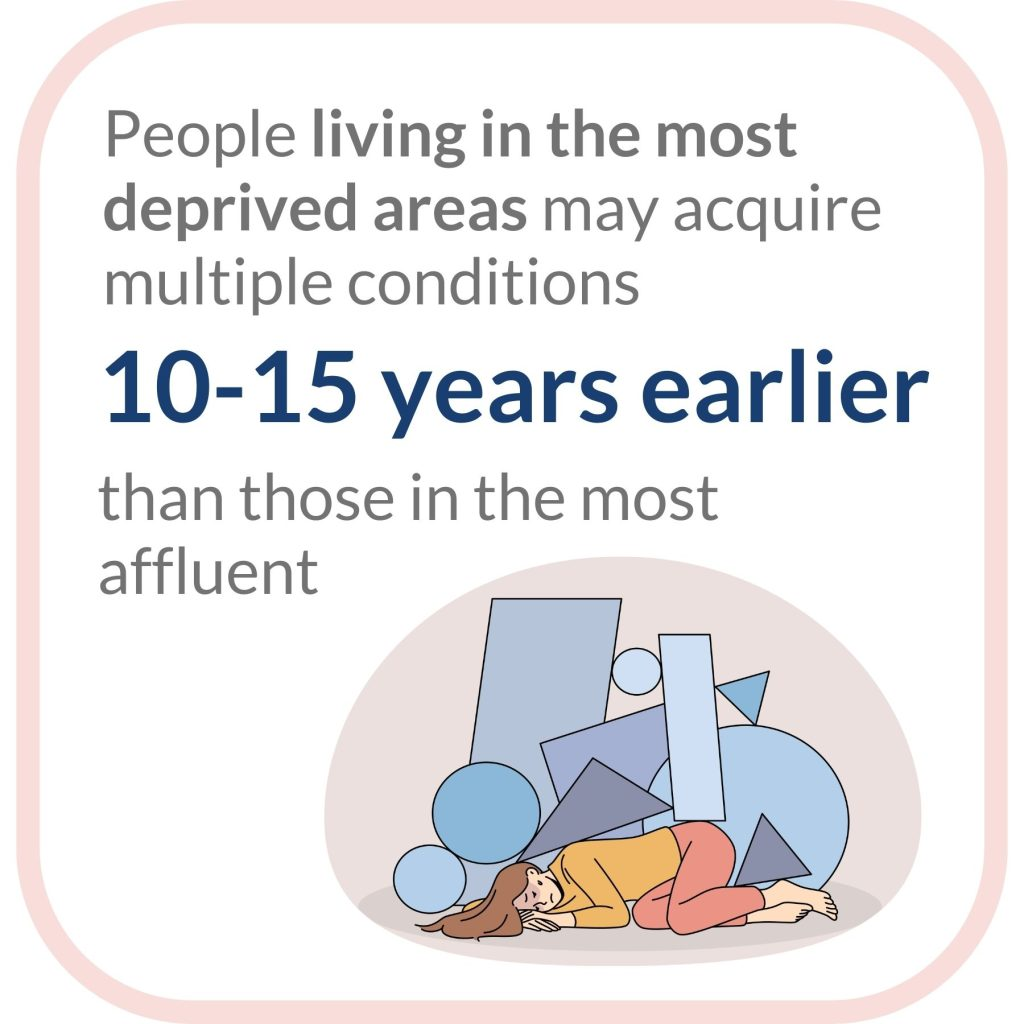
Socioeconomic inequalities influence when people develop multiple long-term conditions.

A range of biological, psychological, behavioural, socioeconomic and environmental factors affect the likelihood of having multimorbidity. How these risk factors interact to trigger multiple long-term conditions is complex and still not fully understood.

One risk factor of multimorbidity in young people is being born premature. Lifestyle factors that may increase the risk of multiple long-term conditions include obesity, poor diet, poor sleep, smoking, air pollution, alcohol; and lifestyles factors that may reduce the risk of MLTC includes eating a healthy diet, physical activity, and strong social networks.

Lower socioeconomic status, measured by a combination of education, occupation and literacy indicators, seems to increase the risk of developing multimorbidity. For instance, based on the Whitehall II Study, people in lower employment positions seem to have a 66% higher risk of developing multiple long-term conditions than people in higher positions. However, socioeconomic status does not appear to influence the risk of dying after the onset of multiple long-term conditions. Another study showed an increase of almost 50% in the odds of multimorbidity occurring in those with the least wealth compared to those with the most wealth. Therefore, reducing socioeconomic inequalities by improving working and living conditions and education to everyone is important to reduce the burden of multiple long-term conditions on population health.

== Diagnosis and impact ==
Multimorbidity is associated with reduced quality of life and increased risk of death. The risk of death is positively associated with individuals with greater number of chronic conditions and reversely associated with socioeconomic status. People with multiple long-term conditions may have a four-fold increase in the risk of death in comparison with people without MLTC irrespective of their socioeconomic status.

In some cases, specific combinations of diseases are associated with higher mortality. For example, people with long-term conditions affecting the heart, lung, and urinary systems have strong effects on mortality.

There are many additional issues associated with living with multiple long term conditions. One study from the US found that having more than 3 conditions significantly increased the chance of reduced quality of life and physical functioning. The researchers called for the holistic treatment of multimorbidities due to the complexities of multiple long-term conditions.

Due to the higher prevalence of multimorbidity (55 - 98%), a new concept of "complex multimorbidity (CMM)" has been proposed CMM differs from the definition of conventional multimorbidity in that CMM is defined by the number of body systems affected by the diseases rather than the number of diseases. CMM is associated is mortality and long-term care needs in older adults.

=== Mental health ===
Physical and mental health conditions can adversely impact the other through a number of pathways, and have significant impact on health and wellbeing. For people whose long-term conditions include severe mental illness, the lifespan can be 10–20 years less than the general population. For them, addressing the underlying risk factors for physical health problems is critical to good outcomes.

There is considerable evidence that having multiple long-term physical conditions can lead to the development of both depression and anxiety. There are many factors which might explain why physical multi-morbidity affects mental health including chronic pain, frailty, symptom burden, functional impairment, reduced quality of life, increased levels of inflammation, and polypharmacy. Evidence from large population studies from the United Kingdom and China suggests that specific combinations of physical conditions increase the risk of developing depression and anxiety more than others, such as co-occurring respiratory disorders and co-occurring painful and gastrointestinal disorders. There has been a scarcity of economic evaluations concerning interventions for managing individuals with mental-physical multimorbidity, including depression. A recent systematic review identified four intervention types (collaborative care, self-management, telephone-based, and antidepressant treatment)) that were assessed for cost-effectiveness in high-income countries. However, such evaluations are currently absent in low-income and middle-income countries as no studies have been identified in these regions.

Strategies to prevent the onset of depression or depressive episodes in people with long-term physical conditions include psychological interventions and pharmacological interventions, however the long-term effectiveness and benefits of these approaches is very uncertain.

=== Healthcare ===
People with multimorbidity face many challenges because of the way health systems are organised. Most health systems are designed to cater for people with a single chronic condition. Some of the difficulties experienced by people with multiple long-term conditions include: poor coordination of medical care, managing multiple medications (polypharmacy), high costs associated with treatment, increases in their time spent managing illness, difficulty managing multiple illness management regimes, and aggravation of one condition by symptoms or treatment of another.

There is growing recognition that living with multiple long-term conditions leads to complex and challenging burdens for people living with MLTC themselves but also health care professionals working in the health system looking after those with long-term conditions. Living with multiple-long term conditions can be burdensome in terms of managing the illness, particularly if the diagnoses results in polypharmacy (taking multiple medicines).

==== Medication management ====
Older people and their family carers frequently find medication management a burden. This burden fluctuates and is often hidden from health and social care practitioners. For example, the burden, on the family carer, may increase if the older person is suffering from confusion or dementia. In general there are five burdens that make managing medicines challenging for older people: when the purpose of reviewing medicines is not clear to the person; when a lack of information prevents the person contributing to decisions about their health; when people with MLTC don't see the same health care professional consistently; when people are seen by lots of different professionals working across different services; and when the health service does not recognise the experiences of people living with MLTC. To help older people and their family carers experiencing medication-related burden, medical professionals can consider this burden when changing or amending a medication.

Multimorbidity often results in taking 5 or more medicines (polypharmacy) which can represent a burden and might come with potential harm. When the medications are not effective enough or the risks outweigh the benefits, stopping medicines (deprescribing) might be necessary. In people with multiple long-term conditions and polypharmacy this represents a complex challenge as clinical guidelines are usually developed for single conditions. In these cases tools and guidelines like the Beers Criteria and STOPP/START could be used safely by clinicians but not all patients might benefit from stopping their medication. Clarity about how much clinicians can do beyond the guidelines and the responsibility they need to take could help them prescribing and deprescribing for complex cases. Further factors that can help clinicians tailor their decisions to the individual are: access to detailed data on the people in their care (including their backgrounds and personal medical goals), discussing plans to stop a medicine already when it is first prescribed, and a good relationship that involves mutual trust and regular discussions on progress. Furthermore, longer appointments for prescribing and deprescribing would allow time explain the process of deprescribing, explore related concerns, and support making the right decisions.

== Prevention ==
There are well-evidenced prevention strategies for many of the component diseases of multiple condition clusters. For example:

- quitting smoking - to prevent cardiovascular, respiratory and several neoplastic diseases
- a reduction in blood pressure - to prevent coronary disease, ischaemic stroke, cerebral haemorrhage, congestive heart failure and chronic kidney disease, and
- LDL-cholesterol lowering - to prevent coronary heart disease and ischaemic stroke.

An increased understanding of which conditions most commonly cluster, along with their underlying risk factors, would help prioritise strategies for early diagnosis, screening and prevention.

== Epidemiology ==
Multimorbidity is common in older adults, estimated to affect over half of those aged 65 and over. This increased prevalence has been explained by older adults' "longer exposure and increased vulnerability to risk factors for chronic health problems". For example, COVID-19 has been shown to be associated with an increased risk of multimorbidity in individuals with one pre-existing chronic condition.

The prevalence of multimorbidity has been increasing in recent decades. The high prevalence of multimorbidity has led to some describing it as "The most common chronic condition". Multimorbidity is also more common among people from lower socioeconomic statuses. Multimorbidity is a significant issue in low‐ and middle‐income countries, although prevalence is not as high as in high income countries.

=== As a global health issue and in the demographic transition ===
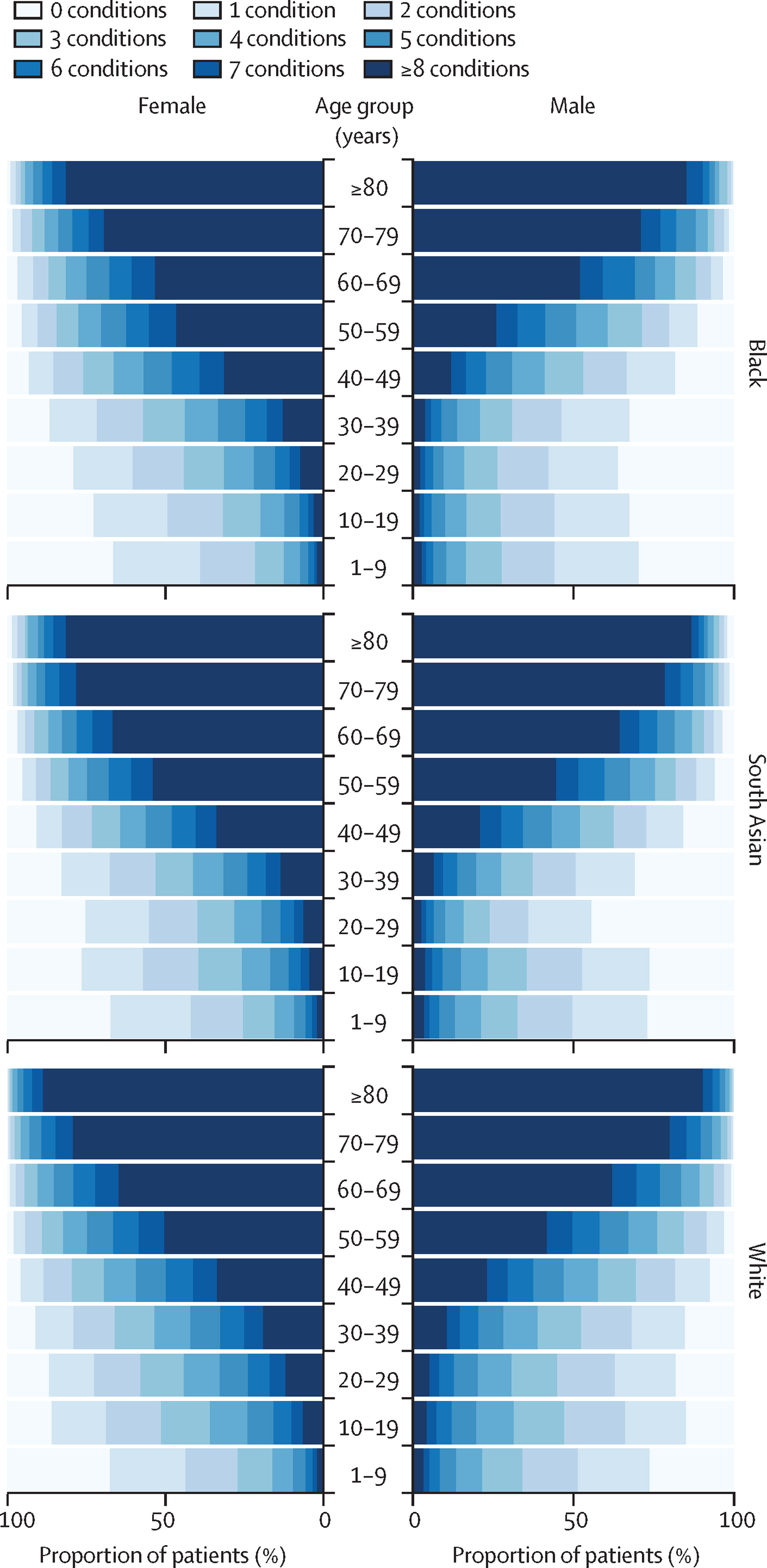
Number of conditions ever recorded per individual (from 308 health conditions), stratified by age, sex, and ethnicity

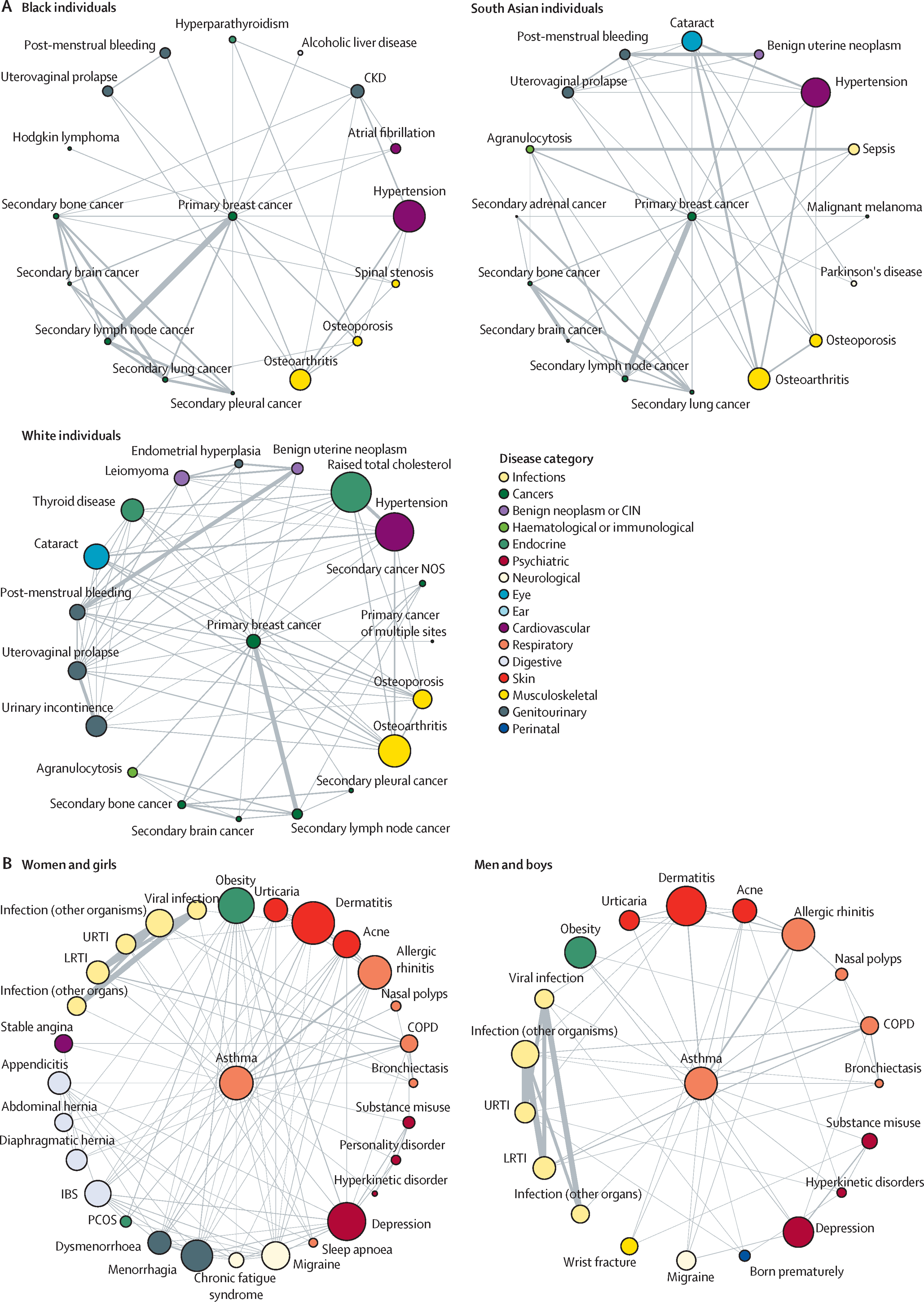
Comparison of comorbidities for primary breast cancer by ethnicity (A), and asthma by sex (B)

Multimorbidity is "a growing public health problem worldwide", "likely driven by the ageing population but also by factors such as high body-mass index, urbanisation, and the growing burden of NCDs (such as type 2 diabetes) and tuberculosis in low- and middle-income countries (LMICs)". Around the world, many people do not die from one isolated condition but from a multitude of factors and conditions. A study suggested there is a paucity of multimorbidity and comorbidity data globally and mapped comorbidity patterns.

With aging populations, there is a rise of age-related diseases which puts major burdens on healthcare systems as well as contemporary economies or contemporary economics and their appendant societal systems. Healthspan extension and anti-aging research seek to extend the span of health in the old as well as slow aging or its negative impacts such as physical and mental decline. Modern anti-senescent and regenerative technology with augmented decision making could help "responsibly bridge the healthspan-lifespan gap for a future of equitable global wellbeing". Aging is "the most prevalent risk factor for chronic disease, frailty and disability, and it is estimated that there will be over 2 billion persons age > 60 by the year 2050", making it a large global health challenge that demands substantial (and well-orchestrated or efficient) efforts, including interventions that alter and target the inborn aging process.

== Health inequalities ==
The likelihood of having multiple long-term conditions is increased by socioeconomic inequalities. Certain groups of disadvantaged or discriminated people are more likely to struggle with earlier and more severe multimorbidity. Multimorbidity is also associated with factors that are related to socioeconomic disadvantage such as food insecurity, low level of education, living in deprived areas and having unhealthy lifestyles.

There are multiple theories on how socioeconomic inequality leads to multimorbidity but so far there is a lack of scientific evidence about the exact mechanism. Some of the potential links between the two are health-related behaviours (smoking, drinking, diet), lack of access to financial resources and housing, and the psychological response to living in difficult circumstances. Knowing the exact pathway would allow designing effective interventions that prevent or mitigate inequalities in multimorbidity.

=== Deprivation and poverty ===
Living in poverty or deprived areas is associated with higher rates of multimorbidity. Those with the lowest income have a 4 times higher chance of having multiple long-term conditions than those with the highest income. Self-management is vital in coping with multimorbidity but people living in deprivation struggle more with managing their conditions. Self-management becomes more challenging due to financial barriers, health literacy (difficulties with understanding health information) and the combined weight of multimorbidity and deprivation.

Research shows that in Scotland residents of deprived areas are affected by multiple long-term conditions 10 to 15 years earlier than people living in affluent neighborhoods. They also have a higher chance that their long-term conditions include mental health disorders. In England, according to research, people from deprived neighborhoods had complex multimorbidity (3 or more conditions) 7 years earlier than the least deprived. People living in deprived areas also have a higher risk of dying because of multimorbidity.

=== Ethnicity and sexual orientation ===
Ethnic inequalities also affect who acquires multimorbidity. In the United Kingdom, Indian, Pakistani, Bangladeshi, Black African, Black Caribbean people and those who identify as Black other, other Asian, and mixed ethnicity have a higher risk of developing multiple long-term conditions. In England, people from Pakistani and Bangladeshi backgrounds have the highest multimorbidity rates and they are twice as likely than people from the Chinese minority to have multimorbidity. Pakistani, Black African, Black Caribbean and other black ethnic groups in England are also significantly more likely to die due to having multiple long-term conditions.

Belonging to a sexual minority also means being disproportionately affected by multimorbidity, especially mental health conditions.

== Research directions ==
Research funders in the UK, including the Medical Research Council (MRC), the Wellcome Trust and the National Institute for Health and Care Research (NIHR) have published the "Cross-funder multimorbidity research framework" which sets out a vision for the research agenda of multiple long-term conditions. The framework aims to drive advances in the understanding of multiple long-term conditions and promote a change in research culture to tackle multimorbidity. The NIHR also published its own strategic framework regarding MLTC which aligns with the cross-funder framework.

As rehabilitation usually focuses on a single disease people with multiple long-term conditions are often excluded or not all their conditions are treated during rehabilitation. Researchers are looking for new models of rehabilitation that could be applied to people with multimorbidity. For example the PERFORM (Personalised Exercise-Rehabilitation For people with Multiple long-term conditions) research group in the UK is developing and evaluating an exercise-based rehabilitation intervention that can be personalised for people with multiple long-term conditions. The MOBILIZE group in Denmark are currently undertaking a randomised controlled trial of a rehabilitation intervention for people with multimorbidity co-developed with people with long-term conditions and clinicians.
