= David Taylor (professor) =

British pharmaceutical scientist (born 1963)

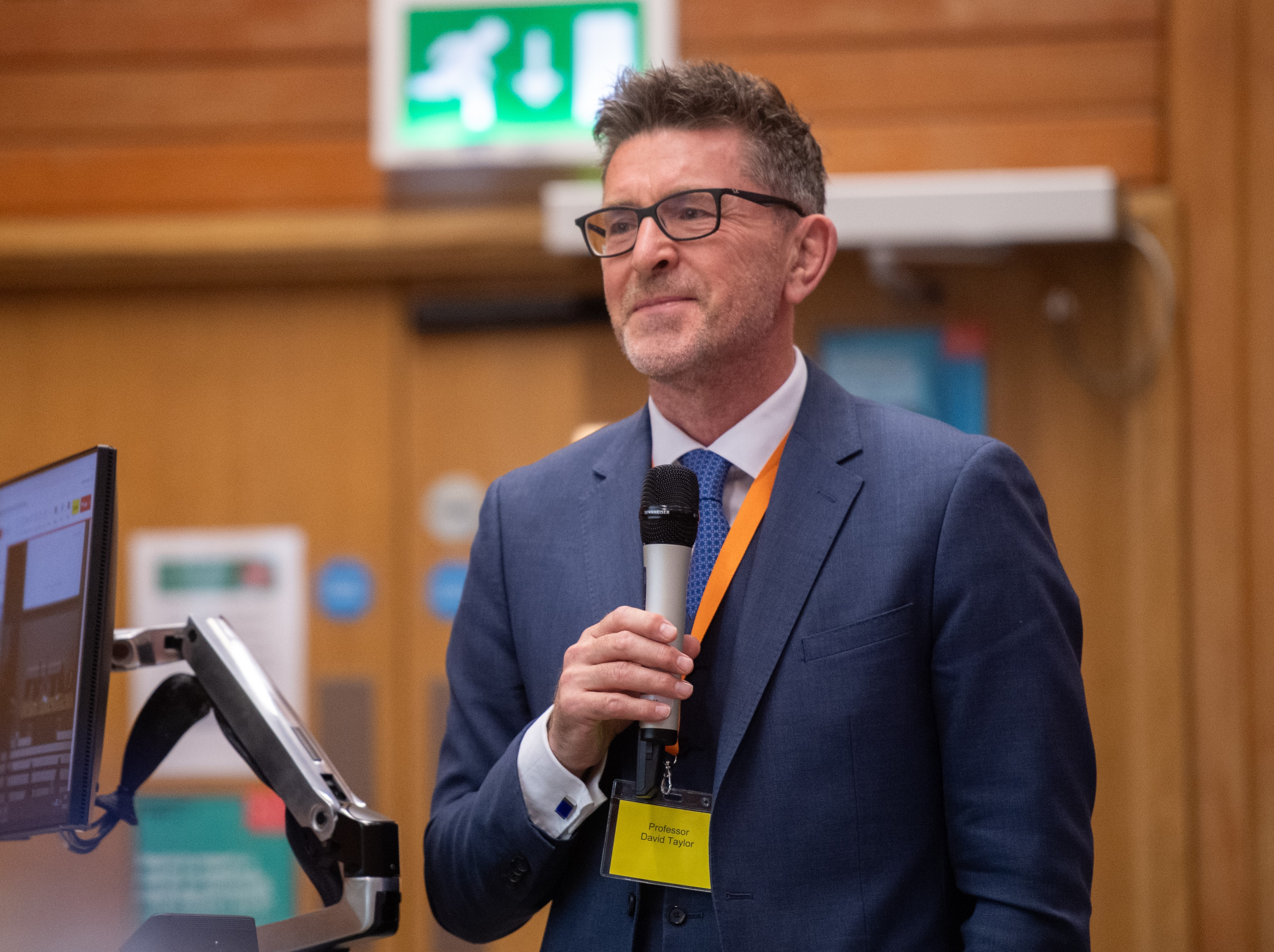
At the Maudsley Guidelines Conference in 2025

David Taylor FFRPS FRCPharm (born 1963) is a British academic pharmacist. He is the head of the Pharmaceutical Sciences Clinical Academic Group within King's Health Partners. Taylor has been lead author and editor of the Maudsley Prescribing Guidelines in Psychiatry since 1994. In 2014, Taylor was named as one of the top 100 clinical leaders in the UK National Health Service.

== Early life and education ==
Taylor was born in Leicester in 1963 and attended Loughborough Grammar School (1975-1982). He is the second of four brothers. His younger brother is the presenter and historian, Stephen Taylor. His father, James Taylor CChem MRSC, contributed to the development of sodium cromoglycate.

Taylor obtained a BSc in pharmacy and an MSc in clinical pharmacy from the University of Brighton. He later gained a PhD in clinical pharmacology at King’s College, London. He is a fellow of the Royal College of Pharmacy (FRCPharm), a fellow of that organisation’s faculty (FFRPS) and an elected fellow of the Royal College of Physicians, Edinburgh (FRCPEdin). In 2021 he was made an honorary fellow of the Royal College of Psychiatrists (FRCPsych Hon) in recognition of his "outstanding contribution to the profession and the cause of mental health".

== Career ==
Taylor's first experience in psychiatry was in 1986 – a brief placement at the Towers Hospital in Leicester. He then worked in general medicine at hospitals in London and Sydney until joining the Maudsley hospital in 1993. In 1997 Taylor founded the national centre for information on drugs in, part of the UKMi network. He has been head of pharmacy since 1995 and Director of Pharmacy and Pathology at the South London and Maudsley NHS Foundation Trust since 2000.

In 2008, Taylor was awarded a chair in psychopharmacology at King’s College, London and also made honorary professor at the Institute of Psychiatry. Since 2010, Taylor has been head of the Pharmaceutical Sciences Clinical Academic Group within King's Health Partners.

=== Public works ===
Taylor was chairman of the UK Psychiatric Pharmacy Group (1997-1999) and the foundation president of the College of Mental Health Pharmacists, a role recognised by the award of a lifetime fellowship (FCMHP). He was a member of the government-appointed panel which brought in laws in drug driving and between 2020 and 2024 was a member of the Advisory Council on the Misuse of Drugs.

Taylor has been a member of several NICE panels responsible for drawing up treatment guidelines in mental health, including the 2022 guideline on depression in adults.

Since 2011 he has been editor-in-chief of the journal Therapeutic Advances in Psychopharmacology which was launched in the same year. The journal has an official Impact Factor of 5.0 and is ranked 41st out of 293 psychiatry journals.

== Research ==
Taylor has authored around 500 papers (H Index 84 ) in journals such as the Lancet, BMJ, British Journal of Psychiatry and Journal of Clinical Psychiatry, on subjects ranging from the value of long-acting antipsychotic injections, the efficacy of psilocybin as an antidepressant and the efficacy and safety of agomelatine. Taylor’s research has helped further understanding of the use of clozapine. In 2022 he suggested a refined phenotype for genetic studies into clozapine-related agranulocytosis. His work directly contributed to the change in clozapine monitoring requirements announced by the European medicines Agency. He has also developed a genetic test predicting response to clozapine and the risk of agranulocytosis. This test is marketed in the UK by Myogenes. Most recently Taylor has tackled the controversial subjects of discontinuation of antidepressants and antipsychotics. He is co-founder of 428 Pharma a company developing the world's first antidepressant long-acting injection which is designed for use both as longterm treatment and, at different dosage levels, as a means of successfully withdrawing from antidepressant treatment. Taylor has pioneered the use of point-of-care capillary testing for clozapine

=== Maudsley Prescribing Guidelines ===
Taylor was the originator of the idea of an evidenced-based mental health prescribing guideline along with the late professor Robert Kerwin and has made a major and unique contribution by writing the Maudsley Prescribing Guidelines for over 30 years. Taylor is the de facto editor of this publication and is the only author to be credited on all 15 editions. The Maudsley Prescribing Guidelines have sold over 300,000 copies in thirteen languages. The 15th edition was published in April 2025. He has also co-written four other books in the Maudsley Prescribing Guidelines series, including The Maudsley Deprescribing Guidelines, first published in January 2024.

== Lectures ==
Professor Taylor has lectured throughout the world, including tours of New Zealand (2011), Hong Kong (2016), Australia (2019) and Japan (2019). He was a keynote speaker at the 2018 annual meeting of Royal Australian and New Zealand College of Psychiatrists in Auckland, at the Royal College of Psychiatrists annual meeting in London in 2019, and at The 119th Annual Meeting of the Japanese Society of Psychiatry and Neurology in 2023.

== Selected publications ==
- The Use of Drugs in Psychiatry, Cookson J, Taylor D, Katona C, 2002. Gaskell.
- Schizophrenia in Focus. 2006. David M Taylor. Pharmaceutical Press
- The effects of antidepressants on cardiometabolic and other physiological parameters: a systematic review and network meta-analysis
- Antidepressant efficacy of agomelatine: meta-analysis of published and unpublished studies. BMJ 2014 Mar 19;348:g1888. David Taylor, Anna Sparshatt, Seema Varma, Olubanke Olofinjana
- Psilocybin with psychological support for treatment-resistant depression: an open-label feasibility study, RL Carhart-Harris, M Bolstridge, J Rucker, CMJ Day, D Erritzoe, M Kaelen, The Lancet Psychiatry 3 (7), 619-627 2016.
- Tapering of SSRI treatment to mitigate withdrawal symptoms. Lancet Psychiatry. 2019; 6: 538–546. Horowitz MA Taylor D
- The Maudsley Guidelines for Physical Health Conditions in Psychiatry. 2020. David Taylor, Fiona Gaughran, Toby Pillinger. Wiley Blackwell.
- Covid has led to record levels of antidepressant use – but withdrawal can be difficult - David Taylor
