= Beers criteria =

Guidelines on medication for older adults

The Beers Criteria for Potentially Inappropriate Medication Use in Older Adults, commonly called the Beers List, are consensus guidelines published by the American Geriatrics Society (AGS) for healthcare professionals to help improve the safety of prescribing medications for adults 65 years and older in all except palliative settings. They emphasize deprescribing medications that are unnecessary, which helps to reduce the problems of polypharmacy, drug interactions, and adverse drug reactions, thereby improving the risk–benefit ratio of medication regimens in at-risk people.

The criteria are used in geriatrics clinical care to monitor and improve the quality of care. They are also used in training, research, and healthcare policy to assist in developing performance measures and document outcomes. These criteria include lists of medications in which the potential risks may be greater than the potential benefits for people 65 and older. By considering this information, practitioners may be able to reduce harmful side effects caused by such medications. The Beers Criteria are intended to serve as a guide for clinicians and not as a substitute for professional judgment in prescribing decisions. The criteria may be used in conjunction with other information to guide clinicians about safe prescribing in older adults..

The criteria are frequently used internationally although they were only intended for use in the United States. Some countries have adapted the criteria to their own context. Others countries have observed that the listed medications may not be applicable in their country. In the US, the list has never been clinically validated; a 2007 study showed that Beers criteria medications caused low numbers of and few risks for emergency department visits for adverse events.

== History ==
Geriatrician Mark H. Beers formulated the Beers Criteria through a consensus panel of experts using the Delphi method. The criteria were originally published in the Archives of Internal Medicine in 1991 and updated in 1997, 2003, 2012, 2015, 2019, and 2023.

The AGS has registered a trademark for the term "AGS Beers Criteria" and in 2018, it formed a commercial partnership to authorize the release of a software application applying its official criteria.

== Management of criteria ==
In 2011, the American Geriatrics Society (AGS) convened an eleven-member multidisciplinary panel of experts in geriatric medicine, nursing, and pharmacotherapy to develop the 2012 edition of the American Geriatrics Society Updated Beers Criteria for Potentially Inappropriate Medication Use in Older Adults.

The 2012 AGS Beers Criteria differ from previous editions in several ways. In addition to using a modified Delphi process for building consensus, the expert panel followed the evidence-based approach that AGS has used since it developed its first practice guideline on persistent pain in 1998. The Institute of Medicine (IOM) in its 2011 report, Clinical Practice Guidelines We Can Trust, recommended that all guideline developers complete a systematic review of the evidence. Following the recommendation of the IOM, AGS added a public comment period that occurred in parallel to its standard invited external peer review process. In a significant departure from previous versions of the criteria, each recommendation is rated for quality of both the evidence supporting the panel's recommendations and the strength of their recommendations.

In another departure from the 2003 criteria, the 2012 AGS Beers Criteria identify and group medications that may be inappropriate for older adults into three different categories instead of the previous two. The first category includes medications that are potentially inappropriate for older people because they either pose high risks of adverse effects or appear to have limited effectiveness in older patients, and because there are alternatives to these medications. The second category includes medications that are potentially inappropriate for older people who have certain diseases or disorders because these drugs may exacerbate the specified health problems. The third category includes medications that, although they may be associated with more risks than benefits in general, may be the best choice for a particular individual if administered with caution.

The 2012 AGS Beers Criteria was released in February 2012 via publication in the early online edition of the Journal of the American Geriatrics Society.

The Beers Criteria was updated in 2019 and 2023.

== Style of the publication ==
Drugs listed on the Beers List are categorized according to risks for negative outcomes. The tables include medications that have cautions, should be avoided, should be avoided with concomitant medical conditions, and are contraindicated and relatively contraindicated in the elderly population. An example of an included drug is diphenhydramine (Benadryl), a first-generation H1 antagonist with anticholinergic properties, which may increase sedation and lead to confusion or falls.
