= Dosing =

General term for feeding small quantities of chemicals or medicines

Dosing generally applies to feeding chemicals or medicines when used in small quantities.

For medicines the term dose is generally used. In the case of inanimate objects the word dosing is typical. The term dose titration, referring to stepwise adjustment of doses until a desired level of effect is reached, is common in medicine.

== Engineering ==
The word dosing is very commonly used by engineers in thermal power stations, in water treatment, in any industry where steam is being generated, and in building services for heating and cooling water treatment. Dosing procedures are also in vogue in textile and similar industries where chemical treatment is involved.

Commercial swimming pools also require chemical dosing in order to control pH balance, chlorine level, and other such water quality criteria. A modern swimming pool plant will have bulk storage of chemicals held in separate dosing tanks and will have automated controls and dosing pumps, also called metering pumps, to top up the various chemicals as required to control the water quality.

In a power station treatment chemicals are injected, or fed, to a boiler system and also to make up water under pressure, but in small dosages or rates of injection. The feeding at all places is done by means of small-capacity dosing pumps specially designed for the duty demanded.

In building services the water quality of various pumped-fluid systems, including for heating, cooling, and condensate water, will be regularly checked and topped up with chemicals manually as required. Most commonly, inhibitors will be added to protect the pipework and components against corrosion, or a biocide will be added to stop the growth of bacteria in lower-temperature systems. The required chemicals will be added to the fluid system by use of a dosing pot; a multi-valved chamber in which the chemical can be added, and then introduced to the fluid system in a controlled manner.

In food industries, the dosing of ingredients is particularly important in order to ensure food safety and quality. Dosing is done in wet processes with dosing pumps but, even more importantly, in dry processes, just prior to the packaging of the product. Dosing of dry materials is commonly done through gain-in-weight or loss-in-weight dosing using equipment on load cells.

== Agriculture ==
See pesticide application

The feeding of chemicals in agriculture has also become common due to technology developments. However agricultural dosing is done by means of hand-held spray pumps.

=== Aerial spraying ===
Sometimes aerial spraying of fixed quantities of substances at certain intervals, or dosing, is also adopted for agricultural spraying and for atmospheric spraying for eliminating certain types of harmful insects.
