= Therapeutic Advances in Psychopharmacology =

- Discipline: Psychopharmacology
- Language: English

Publication details
- History: 2011–present
- Open access: Yes

Standard abbreviations
- ISO 4: Ther. Adv. Psychopharmacol.

Links
- Journal homepage

Therapeutic Advances in Psychopharmacology is a peer-reviewed open access medical journal. The journal was established in 2011.
