= Medication Appropriateness Tool for Comorbid Health conditions during Dementia =

MATCH-D Criteria: USA clinicians, medication health

The Medication Appropriateness Tool for Comorbid Health conditions during Dementia (MATCH-D) criteria supports clinicians to manage medication use specifically for people with dementia without focusing only on the management of the dementia itself.

== History ==
The MATCH-D were developed by medical practitioners and pharmacists at Australian Group of Eight Universities. It was led by Dr Amy Page at the Western Australian Centre for Health and Ageing at the University of Western Australia. The MATCH-D Criteria were developed through a consensus panel of experts using the Delphi method. The criteria were originally published in the Internal Medicine Journal in 2016. The protocol explaining the rigorous methods used to develop the criteria were originally published in the BMJ Open in 2015. The systematic review that informed the criteria were published subsequently in 2018 and updated in 2022.

== Style of the criteria ==
The MATCH-D is presented in categories of recommendations for all stages of dementia, as well as divided into specific recommendations for early, mid and late-stage dementia. The recommendations are groups as: medication side effects, principles for medication use, medication review, treatment goals, preventative medications, symptom management, psycho-active medications and medications to modify dementia progression.

== Reception of the criteria ==
The MATCH-D attracted media attention as it was under development, and as it was released. Page was interviewed on the ABC national radio's science show during its development. The health media picked up the story as soon as it was published.

=== Organisations who recommend the criteria ===
Respected organisations such as the British Geriatrics Society incorporated into their own medicines management guidelines. In New Zealand, the NZ Health Quality & Safety Commission have shared it in their communications.

It is cited and promoted by influential professional bodies in many countries including:

- the British Geriatrics Society's End of Life Care in Frailty guidelines

- New Zealand's Health Quality & Safety Commission's medication management work

- Australia's Royal Australian College of General Practitioners (RACGP) aged care clinical guide known as the Silver Book

- Australia's Pharmaceutical Society of Australia (PSA) Choosing Wisely series

- Australian Commission on Safety and Quality in Health Care

- Australian Deprescribing Network (ADeN)

- Australia's NPS MedicinesWise recommended it in their Medication Management Review Reports: Best practice recommendations program and Changed Behaviour in Dementia.

- New South Wales' Therapeutic Advisory Group (TAG)

== Uses ==
Consumers considered the MATCH-D to be a useful tool for prompting and supporting conversations about their preferences for medication use. They would prefer that these conversations began as early as possible so that their treating health professionals knew their preferences. General practitioners, pharmacists and nurses stated they often felt less comfortable discussing these issues as they were concerned that it may cause distress to the consumer. Health professionals and consumers alike thought that using the MATCH-D as a conversation starter could assist with these conversations.

It is incorporated in to the TaperMD decision support tool and the PIMSPlus platform. This incorporation has hastened the uptake of the criteria in both long term care facilities and community in Canada.

More than one-quarter of Australian consultant pharmacists state that they use the MATCH-D during Home Medicine Reviews. This figure is suggestive of high uptake given that most Home Medicine Reviews are most likely undertaken for people who are not living with dementia.

== Research on the criteria ==
Translational research was undertaken with consumers, general practitioners, nurses and pharmacists to explore the enablers and barriers to using the MATCH-D in practice. This research showed the need for a website (since launched at MATCH-D.com.au), checklists (available at the website) and educational resources. These stakeholder roles have shown that there is a strong need for support and collaboration to improve medication use.

Research at King's College London explored the hazards of suboptimal prescribing and polypharmacy in medicines use for people with dementia. They determined that each year there are globally up to 10 million people living with dementia require hospital treatment (emergency department or hospital admissions) related to medicines related harm for people with dementia. They concluded that, if the MATCH-D were successfully implemented that the relative hazards of medicines use for people with dementia would need to be re-evaluated.

The National Health and Medical Research Council (NHMRC) are currently funding a randomised controlled trial implementing the MATCH-D using pharmacists embedded in general practice.

== Educational resources ==
The Dementia Training Australia funding an interactive online education package for deprescribing in dementia centered around the MATCH-D. It was a joint collaboration between the University of Western Australia, University of Tasmania, La Trobe University, Monash University, Alfred Health and FireFilms. This education package launched in mid-2019. This online course is suitable for consumers and health professionals, with a target audience of nurses working in residential aged care facilities. The training package was in the format of a documentary film, with its original developer, Dr Page featured as narrator and interviewer. It includes simulated patient encounters and expert interviews, interspersed with interactive activities.

The MATCH-D and the training package by Dementia Training Australia have now been incorporated into undergraduate degrees for health professionals including the University of Tasmania's second year Bachelor of Nursing curriculum and Monash University's Bachelor of Pharmacy (Honours) curriculum.
