= Tapering (medicine) =

Gradually reducing the dose of a medication

In medicine, tapering is the practice of gradually reducing the dosage of a medication to reduce or discontinue it. Generally, tapering is done to avoid or minimize withdrawal symptoms that arise from neurobiological adaptation to the drug.

Prescribed psychotropic drugs that may require tapering due to this physical dependence include opioids, selective serotonin reuptake inhibitors, antipsychotics, anticonvulsants, and benzodiazepines.

== Hyperbolic tapering ==
Hyperbolic tapering is where the size of dose reductions become progressively smaller over time as the total dose itself becomes smaller. It is often used when tapering antidepressants to avoid antidepressant discontinuation syndrome. Rather than being based on a linear reduction of total medication dose in milligrams, the goal of hyperbolic tapering is to achieve linear reductions of brain receptor occupancy.

For example when tapering citalopram, a hyperbolic tapering regimen of 20 mg, 9.1 mg, 5.4 mg, 3.4 mg, 2.3 mg, 1.5 mg, 0.8 mg, 0.4 mg, then 0 mg equals an approximate 10% reduction in serotonin receptor occupancy with each dose decrease. The decrease in dose is hyperbolic, getting smaller over time, while the effect on receptor occupancy is linear, equaling about 10% per dose reduction.

== Cross-tapering ==
Cross-tapering refers to the practice of reducing one drug, while introducing a new medication that is titrated to an effective dose. This can be used, for example, when changing antipsychotic medications.

== Peer support groups ==
Peer support groups, such as survivingantidepressants.org, provide a medium where those tapering medication can discuss approaches and withdrawal symptoms. Surviving antidepressants advocate for a slower rate of tapering than that used in standard medical practice. Many such groups exist on Facebook and other social media platforms. Along with sharing tapering tips, members of the groups discuss the risks of prescription cascade, where withdrawal symptoms or the side effects of a psychotropic medication result in further medication, and the risk of neurobiological "kindling" effects where repeated unsuccessful withdrawal attempts yield progressively poor results upon drug reinstatement or, later, may increase the risk of withdrawal symptoms.

== See also ==
- Deprescribing
- Opioid tapering
- Antidepressant discontinuation syndrome
- Benzodiazepine withdrawal syndrome
