= Prescription cascade =

Prescription cascade is the process whereby the side effects of drugs are misdiagnosed as symptoms of another problem, resulting in further prescriptions and further side effects and unanticipated drug interactions, which itself may lead to further symptoms and further misdiagnoses. This is a pharmacological example of a feedback loop. Such cascades can be reversed through deprescribing.

== Theory ==
Over the past 20 years, spending on prescription drugs has increased drastically. This can be attributed to several different situations: There is the increased diagnosis of chronic conditions; and the use of numerous medications by the older population; and an increase in the incidence of obesity has meant an increase in chronic conditions such as diabetes and hypertension. As each condition is treated with a specific drug, a correlating side-effect of each drug comes into play. If a doctor fails to acknowledge all the drugs that a patient is taking, an adverse drug reaction may be misinterpreted as a new medical condition. Another drug is prescribed to treat the new condition, and an adverse drug side-effect occurs that is again mistakenly diagnosed as a new medical condition. Thus the patient is at risk of developing additional adverse effects.

The most frequent medical intervention performed by a doctor is the writing of a prescription. Because chronic illness increases with advancing age, older people are more likely to have conditions that require drug treatment, and they are more likely to suffer the effects of a prescription cascade.

A prescriber can do little to modify age-related physiological changes when trying to minimize the likelihood that an older person will develop an adverse drug reaction. However, when assessing a patient who is already taking drugs, a doctor should always consider the development of any new signs and symptoms as a possible consequence of the patient's drug treatment.

== Polypharmacy ==
Polypharmacy is the use of numerous medications at the same time (from the root "multiple pharmacies"). As people age, various health conditions may arise and must be treated. Suffering a range of issues from short-term medical conditions to chronic conditions like diabetes or high blood pressure, the older patient may be medicated by a variety of drugs at one time. A review in 2010 found that the average 81-year-old is taking an average of 15 different medications at the same time, ranging from 6 to 28 medications. It also found approximately 8.9 drug-related problems per patient in the study, ranging from 3 to 19 problems. The review found that patients were commonly taking medications that they did not need anymore. More specifically, work from Australia has identified that 16% of older people use medicines that are part of a prescribing cascade.
