= Deprescribing =

Process to taper or stop medications

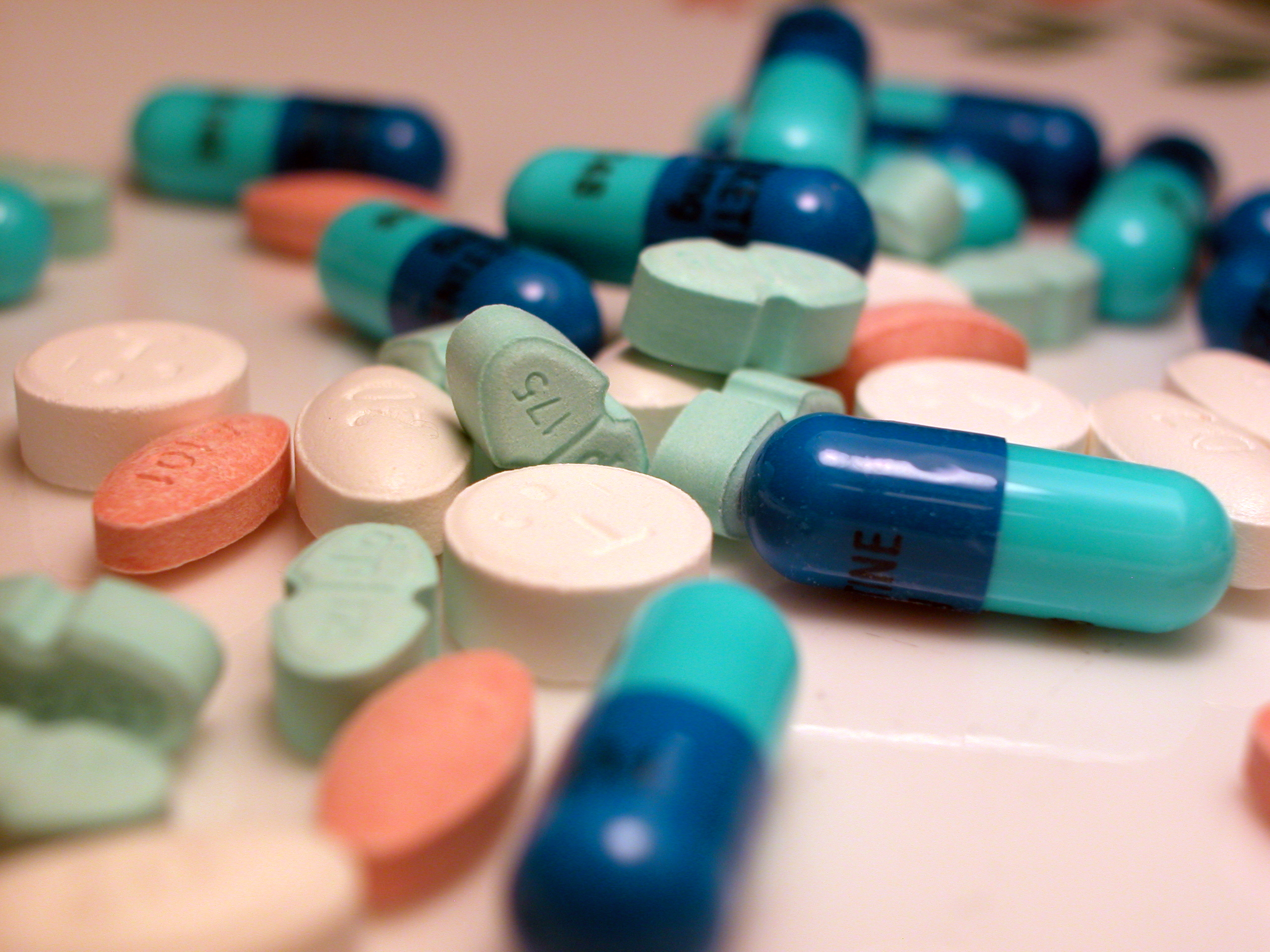
Reduce medication burden and harm

Deprescribing is a process of tapering or stopping medications to achieve improved health outcomes by reducing exposure to medications that are potentially either harmful or no longer required. Deprescribing is important to consider with changing health and care goals over time, as well as polypharmacy and adverse effects. Deprescribing can improve adherence, cost, and health outcomes but may have adverse drug withdrawal effects. More specifically, deprescribing is the planned and supervised process of intentionally stopping a medication or reducing its dose to improve the person's health or reduce the risk of adverse side effects. Deprescribing is usually done because the drug may be causing harm, may no longer be helping the patient, or may be inappropriate for the individual patient's current situation. Deprescribing can help correct polypharmacy and prescription cascade.

Deprescribing is often done with people who have multiple long-term conditions (multimorbidity), older people, and people who have a limited life expectancy. In all of these situations, certain medications may contribute to an increased risk of adverse events, and people may benefit from a reduction in the amount of medication taken. Deprescribing aims to reduce medication burden and harm while maintaining or improving quality of life. "Simply because a patient has tolerated a therapy for a long duration does not mean that it remains an appropriate treatment. Thoughtful review of a patient's medication regimen in the context of any changes in medical status and potential future benefits should occur regularly, and those agents that may no longer be necessary should be considered for a trial of medication discontinuation."

The process of deprescribing is usually planned and supervised by healthcare professionals. To some, the definition of deprescribing includes only completely stopping a medication, while to others, deprescribing also includes dose reduction, which can improve quality of life (minimize side effects) while maintaining benefits.

== History ==
The world's first published use of the term "deprescribing" was described in 2003 by Michael Woodward in his article titled 'Deprescribing: Achieving Better Health Outcomes for Older People through Reducing Medications.' It was published in the Society of Hospital Pharmacists of Australia's flagship Journal of Pharmacy Practice and Research (JPPR).'

== Demographics ==
Older people are the heaviest users of medications and frequently take five or more medications (polypharmacy). Polypharmacy is associated with increased risks of adverse events, drug interactions, falls, hospitalization, cognitive deficits, and mortality. These effects are particularly seen in high-risk prescribing. Thus, optimizing medication through targeted deprescribing is a vital part of managing chronic conditions, avoiding adverse effects and improving outcomes.

== Evidence base ==
Deprescribing is considered a potential intervention with reported safety and feasibility. For a wide range of medications, including diuretics, blood pressure medication, sedatives, antidepressants, benzodiazepines and nitrates, adverse effects of deprescribing are rare. While deprescribing has been shown to result in fewer medications, it is less certain if deprescribing is associated with significant changes in health outcomes. Although it might be possible and safe to reduce the number of medicines that people use, reversing the potential harms associated with polypharmacy may not always be achievable. Early evidence suggested that deprescribing may reduce premature death, leading to calls to undertake a double-blind study. A placebo-controlled, double-blind, randomized controlled trial was published in 2023. This study undertook deprescribing in people over 65 years living in residential aged care. It found no change in mortality and that, if implemented in all residential aged care facilities across Australia, it could save up to $16 million annually.

Deprescribing medications may improve patient function, generate a higher quality of life, and reduce bothersome signs and symptoms. Deprescribing has been shown to reduce the number of falls people experience but not to change the risk of having the first fall. Most health outcomes remain unchanged as an effect of deprescribing. The absence of a change has been viewed as a positive outcome, as the medications can often be safely withdrawn without altering health outcomes. This absence of an effect means that older people may not miss out on potentially beneficial effects of using medications due to deprescribing.

Targeted deprescribing can improve adherence to other drugs. Deprescribing can reduce the complexity of medication schedules. Complicated schedules are difficult for people to follow correctly.

The product information provided by drug companies provides much information on how to start medications and what to expect when using them. However, it provides little information on when and how to stop medications. Research into deprescribing is accumulating, with two papers showing a rapid acceleration in using the word since 2015.

In people with multiple long-term conditions and polypharmacy, deprescribing represents a complex challenge as clinical guidelines are usually developed for single conditions. In these cases, tools and guidelines like the Beers Criteria and STOPP/START could be used safely by clinicians, but not all patients might benefit from stopping their medication. There is a need for clarity about how much clinicians can do beyond the guidelines and the responsibility they need to take could help them prescribing and deprescribing for complex cases. Further factors that can help clinicians tailor their decisions to the individual are: access to detailed data on the people in their care (including their backgrounds and personal medical goals), discussing plans to stop a medicine already when it is first prescribed, and a good relationship that involves mutual trust and regular discussions on progress. Furthermore, longer appointments for prescribing and deprescribing would allow time to explain the process, explore related concerns, and support making the right decisions.

A review analysed way to improve deprescribing in primary care. It concluded that clearly defined roles and responsibilities, with good communication between multidisciplinary team members, and pharmacists integrated within teams could aid deprescribing. Routine discussions about deprescribing when prescribing, with medication reviews tailored to patients' needs and preferences could also help. Patients and informal carers should be involved in decisions, and trusted relationships should be built up with professionals allowing continuity of care. Clinicians would also benefit from training and education on deprescribing.

== Risks ==
It is possible for the patient to develop adverse drug withdrawal events (ADWE). These symptoms may be related to the original reason why the medication was prescribed, to withdrawal symptoms or to underlying diseases that medications have masked. For some medications, ADWEs can generally be minimized or avoided by tapering the dose slowly and carefully monitoring for symptoms. Prescribers should be aware of which medications usually require tapering (such as corticosteroids and benzodiazepines) and which can be safely stopped suddenly (such as antibiotics and nonsteroidal anti-inflammatory drugs).

=== Monitoring ===
Deprescribing requires detailed follow-up and monitoring, not unlike the attention required when starting a new medication. It is recommended that prescribers frequently monitor "relevant signs, symptom, laboratory or diagnostic tests that were the original indications for starting the medication," as well as for potential withdrawal effects. The recommended schedule for monitoring during deprescribing is at two-week intervals.

== Resources to support deprescribing ==
=== Implicit tools ===
Several tools have been published to inform prescribers of inappropriate medications for various patient groups. The most common deprescribing algorithm is validated and has been tested in two RCTs. It is available for clinicians to identify medications that can be deprescribed. It prompts clinicians to consider if it is (1) an inappropriate prescription, (2) adverse effects or interactions that outweigh symptomatic effects or potential future benefits, (3) drugs taken for symptom relief but the symptoms are stable, and (4) drug intended to prevent future severe events but the potential benefit is unlikely to be realized due to limited life expectancy. If the answer to any of the four prompts is yes, then the medication should be considered for deprescribing.

The CEASE algorithm prompts clinicians to consider if the treated condition remains a current concern for their patient.

The ERASE algorithm prompts clinicians to consider whether the treated condition still requires treatment. The ERASE mnemonic stands for "evaluate diagnostic parameters," "resolved conditions," "ageing normally," "select targets," and "eliminate."

=== Explicit tools ===
The Beers Criteria and the STOPP/START criteria present medications that may be inappropriate for use in older adults, including drugs associated with high risk of adverse reactions for this population or lacking evidence for their benefits when safer and more effective alternatives exist. Some countries, such as, Australia have their lists of Potentially Inappropriate Medicines. For people with dementia, the Medication Appropriateness Tool for Comorbid Health Conditions in Dementia (MATCH-D) can help clinicians identify when and what to consider deprescribing.

=== Resources ===
RxFiles, an academic detailing group based in Saskatchewan, Canada, has developed a tool to help long-term care providers identify potentially inappropriate medications in their residents. Tasmanian Medicare Local has created resources to help clinicians deprescribe. Theoretical Underpinnings of a Model to Reduce Polypharmacy and Its Negative Health Effects: Introducing the Team Approach to Polypharmacy Evaluation and Reduction (TAPER) is a framework to support practitioners in deprescribing.

==== Guidelines to inform deprescribing ====
Deprescribing guidelines provide structured approaches to safely reduce or stop medications that may no longer be beneficial or could be harmful. The Maudsley Guidelines offer comprehensive strategies for tapering antidepressants, benzodiazepines, gabapentinoids, and Z-drugs, emphasizing the importance of distinguishing withdrawal symptoms from the underlying condition. The Bruyere Guidelines, developed by the deprescribing.org team, include evidence-based algorithms and decision-support tools for various medication classes, such as proton pump inhibitors and antipsychotics. The Tasmanian Primary Health Network Guidelines focus on minimizing polypharmacy and improving patient outcomes through detailed deprescribing strategies for a wide range of medications, including opioids and antihypertensives. Additionally, the new evidence based guidelines available at deprescribing.com provide resources and support for healthcare providers and patients to optimize medication use and enhance quality of life.

== Practice changes to encourage deprescribing ==
An expert working group concluded that integrated healthcare provided by multidisciplinary patient-centred teams was the most appropriate approach to promote deprescribing and improve appropriate medication use. Deprescribing rounds in tertiary care hospitals have also been evaluated and shown to improve health-related outcomes.

== Barriers and enablers to deprescribing ==
=== Barriers ===
Although many trials have successfully resulted in a reduction in medication use, there are some barriers to deprescribing:

- the prescriber's beliefs, attitudes, knowledge, skills, and behaviour
- the prescriber's work environment, including work setting, health system and cultural factors
- patients' fears about cessation or dislike of medications.

=== Enablers ===
- the prescriber's beliefs, attitudes, knowledge, skills, and behaviour
- the prescriber's work environment, including work setting, health system and cultural factors
- the patient's agreement that deprescribing was appropriate,
- a structured process for cessation,
- the patients' need for influences or reasons to cease medication,

The prescriber and patients were shown to have the most significant influence on each other rather than external influences. 9 out of 10 older people said they would be willing to stop one or more medications if their doctor said it was okay.

== See also ==
- Tapering (medicine)
- Medication discontinuation
- Overmedication
- Polypharmacy
- Beers Criteria – Guidelines on medication in older adults
- Medication Appropriateness Tool for Comorbid Health Conditions During Dementia (MATCH-D)
- Drug interaction
