= Polypharmacy =

Use of multiple medications daily

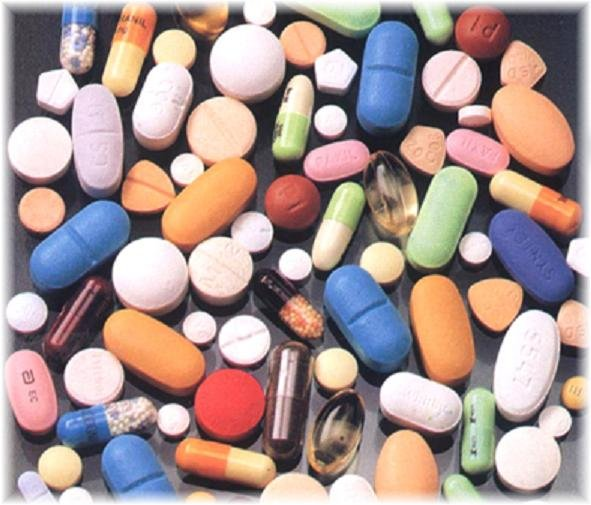
Polypharmacy is often defined as taking 5 or more medicines.

Polypharmacy (polypragmasia) is an umbrella term to describe the simultaneous use of multiple medicines by a patient for their conditions. The term polypharmacy is often defined as regularly taking five or more medicines, but there is no standard definition, and the term has also been used when a person is prescribed 2 or more medications at the same time. Polypharmacy may be the consequence of having multiple long-term conditions, also known as multimorbidity. Both are more common in the elderly. Polypharmacy may increase the risk of an adverse event in elderly populations and/or those with many chronic comorbidities. In many cases, polypharmacy cannot be avoided, but 'appropriate polypharmacy' practices are encouraged to decrease the risk of adverse effects. Appropriate polypharmacy is defined as polypharmacy in which medications prescribed are optimized, necessary, and follow 'best evidence' practices.

The prevalence of polypharmacy is estimated to be between 10% and 90% depending on the definition used, the age group studied, and the geographic location. Polypharmacy continues to grow in importance because of aging populations. Many countries are experiencing a fast growth of the older population, 65 years and older. This growth is a result of the baby-boomer generation getting older and an increased life expectancy as a result of ongoing improvement in health care services worldwide. About 21% of adults with intellectual disability are also exposed to polypharmacy. The level of polypharmacy has been increasing in the past decades. Research in the USA shows that the percentage of patients greater than 65 years-old using more than 5 medications increased from 24% to 39% between 1999 and 2012. Similarly, research in the UK found that the number of older people taking 5 plus medication had quadrupled from 12% to nearly 50% between 1994 and 2011.

Polypharmacy is not necessarily ill-advised, but it can lead to negative outcomes or poor treatment effectiveness; it is often more harmful than helpful or presents too much risk for too little benefit. Therefore, health professionals consider polypharmacy a situation that requires monitoring and review to validate whether all of the medications are still necessary. Concerns about polypharmacy include increased adverse drug reactions, drug interactions, prescribing cascade, and higher costs. Polypharmacy also increases the burden of taking medication, particularly in older people, and is associated with medication non-adherence.

Polypharmacy is associated with a decreased quality of life, including decreased mobility and cognition. Patient factors that influence the number of medications a patient is prescribed include a high number of chronic conditions requiring a complex drug regimen. Other systemic factors that impact the number of medications a patient is prescribed include a patient having multiple prescribers and multiple pharmacies that may not communicate.

Whether or not the advantages of polypharmacy (over taking single medications or monotherapy) outweigh the disadvantages or risks depends upon the particular combination and diagnosis involved in any given case. The use of multiple drugs, even in fairly straightforward illnesses, is not an indicator of poor treatment and is not necessarily overmedication. Moreover, it is well accepted in pharmacology that it is impossible to accurately predict the side effects or clinical effects of a combination of drugs without studying that particular combination of drugs in test subjects. Knowledge of the pharmacologic profiles of the individual drugs in question does not assure accurate prediction of the side effects of combinations of those drugs; and effects also vary among individuals because of genome-specific pharmacokinetics. Therefore, deciding whether and how to reduce a list of medications (deprescribe) is often not simple and requires the experience and judgment of a practicing clinician, as the clinician must weigh the pros and cons of keeping the patient on the medication. However, such thoughtful and wise review is an ideal that too often does not happen, owing to problems such as poorly handled care transitions (poor continuity of care, usually because of siloed information), overworked physicians and other clinical staff, and interventionism.

== Appropriate medical uses ==
While polypharmacy is typically regarded as undesirable, prescription of multiple medications can be appropriate and therapeutically beneficial in some circumstances. "Appropriate polypharmacy" is described as prescribing for complex or multiple conditions in such a way that necessary medicines are used based on the best available evidence at the time to preserve safety and well-being. Polypharmacy is clinically indicated in some chronic conditions, for example in diabetes mellitus, but should be discontinued when evidence of benefit from the prescribed drugs no longer outweighs potential for harm (described below in Contraindications).

Often certain medications can interact with others in a positive way specifically intended when prescribed together, to achieve a greater effect than any of the single agents alone. This is particularly prominent in the field of anesthesia and pain management – where atypical agents such as antiepileptics, antidepressants, muscle relaxants, NMDA antagonists, and other medications are combined with more typical analgesics such as opioids, prostaglandin inhibitors, NSAIDS and others. This practice of pain management drug synergy is known as an analgesia sparing effect.

=== Examples ===
- A legitimate treatment regimen in the first year after a myocardial infarction may include: a statin, an ACE inhibitor, a beta-blocker, aspirin, paracetamol and an antidepressant.
- In anesthesia (particularly IV anesthesia and general anesthesia) multiple agents are almost always required – including hypnotics or analgesic inducing/maintenance agents such as midazolam or propofol, usually an opioid analgesic such as morphine or fentanyl, a paralytic such as vecuronium, and in inhaled general anesthesia generally a halogenated ether anesthetic such as sevoflurane or desflurane.

== Special populations ==
People who are at greatest risk for negative polypharmacy consequences include elderly people, people with psychiatric conditions, patients with intellectual or developmental disabilities, people taking five or more drugs at the same time, those with multiple physicians and pharmacies, people who have been recently hospitalized, people who have concurrent comorbidities, people who live in rural communities, people with inadequate access to education, and those with impaired vision or dexterity. Marginalized populations may have a greater degrees of polypharmacy, which can occur more frequently in younger age groups.

It is not uncommon for people who are dependent or addicted to substances to enter or remain in a state of polypharmacy misuse. About 84% of prescription drug misusers reported using multiple drugs. Note, however, that the term polypharmacy and its variants generally refer to legal drug use as-prescribed, even when used in a negative or critical context.

Measures can be taken to limit polypharmacy to its truly legitimate and appropriate needs. This is an emerging area of research, frequently called deprescribing. Reducing the number of medications, as part of a clinical review, can be an effective healthcare intervention. Clinical pharmacists can perform drug therapy reviews and teach physicians and their patients about drug safety and polypharmacy, as well as collaborating with physicians and patients to correct polypharmacy problems. Similar programs are likely to reduce the potentially deleterious consequences of polypharmacy such as adverse drug events, non-adherence, hospital admissions, drug-drug interactions, geriatric syndromes, and mortality. Such programs hinge upon patients and doctors informing pharmacists of other medications being prescribed, as well as herbal, over-the-counter substances and supplements that occasionally interfere with prescription-only medication. Staff at residential aged care facilities have a range of views and attitudes towards polypharmacy that, in some cases, may contribute to an increase in medication use.

== Risks of polypharmacy ==
The risk of polypharmacy increases with age, although there is some evidence that it may decrease slightly after age 90 years. Poorer health is a strong predictor of polypharmacy at any age, although it is unclear whether the polypharmacy causes the poorer health or if polypharmacy is used because of the poorer health. It appears possible that the risk factors for polypharmacy may be different for younger and middle-aged people compared to older people.

The use of polypharmacy is correlated to the use of potentially inappropriate medications. Potentially inappropriate medications are generally taken to mean those that have been agreed upon by expert consensus, such as by the Beers Criteria. These medications are generally inappropriate for older adults because the risks outweigh the benefits. Examples of these include urinary anticholinergics used to treat incontinence; the associated risks, with anticholinergics, include constipation, blurred vision, dry mouth, impaired cognition, and falls. Many older people living in long term care facilities experience polypharmacy, and under-prescribing of potentially indicated medicines and use of high risk medicines can also occur. Medicine use rises from 6.0 ± 3.8 regular medicines on average when people enter long term care to 8.9 ± 4.1 regular medicines after two years.

Polypharmacy is associated with an increased risk of falls in elderly people. Certain medications are well known to be associated with the risk of falls, including cardiovascular and psychoactive medications. There is some evidence that the risk of falls increases cumulatively with the number of medications. Although often not practical to achieve, withdrawing all medicines associated with falls risk can halve an individual's risk of future falls.

Every medication has potential adverse side-effects. With every drug added, there is an additive risk of side-effects. Also, some medications have interactions with other substances, including foods, other medications, and herbal supplements. 15% of older adults are potentially at risk for a major drug-drug interaction. Older adults are at a higher risk for a drug-drug interaction due to the increased number of medications prescribed and metabolic changes that occur with aging. When a new drug is prescribed, the risk of interactions increases exponentially. Doctors and pharmacists aim to avoid prescribing medications that interact; often, adjustments in the dose of medications need to be made to avoid interactions. For example, warfarin interacts with many medications and supplements that can cause it to lose its effect.

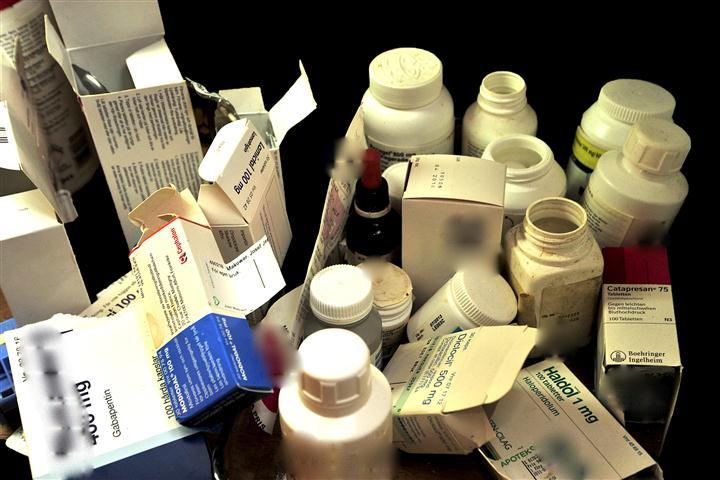

=== Pill burden ===
Pill burden is the number of pills (tablets or capsules, the most common dosage forms) that a person takes on a regular basis, along with all associated efforts that increase with that number — like storing, organizing, consuming, and understanding the various medications in one's regimen. The use of individual medications is growing faster than pill burden. A recent study found that older adults in long term care are taking an average of 14 to 15 tablets every day.

Poor medical adherence is a common challenge among individuals who have increased pill burden and are subject to polypharmacy. It also increases the possibility of adverse medication reactions (side effects) and drug-drug interactions. High pill burden has also been associated with an increased risk of hospitalization, medication errors, and increased costs for both the pharmaceuticals themselves and for the treatment of adverse events. Finally, pill burden is a source of dissatisfaction for many patients and family carers.

High pill burden was commonly associated with antiretroviral drug regimens to control HIV, and is also seen in other patient populations. For instance, adults with multiple common chronic conditions such as diabetes, hypertension, lymphedema, hypercholesterolemia, osteoporosis, constipation, inflammatory bowel disease, and clinical depression may be prescribed more than a dozen different medications daily. The combination of multiple drugs has been associated with an increased risk of adverse drug events.

Reducing pill burden is recognized as a way to improve medication compliance, also referred to as adherence. This is done through "deprescribing", where the risks and benefits are weighed when considering whether to continue a medication. This includes drugs such as bisphosphonates (for osteoporosis), which are often taken indefinitely although there is only evidence to use it for five to ten years. Patient educational programs, reminder messages, medication packaging, and the use of memory tricks has also been seen to improve adherence and reduce pill burden in several countries. These include associating medications with mealtimes, recording the dosage on the box, storing the medication in a special place, leaving it in plain sight in the living room, or putting the prescription sheet on the refrigerator. The development of applications has also shown some benefit in this regard. The use of a polypill regimen, such as combination pill for HIV treatment, as opposed to a multi-pill regimen, also alleviates pill burden and increases adherence.

The selection of long-acting active ingredients over short-acting ones may also reduce pill burden. For instance, ACE inhibitors are used in the management of hypertension. Both captopril and lisinopril are examples of ACE inhibitors. However, lisinopril is dosed once a day, whereas captopril may be dosed 2-3 times a day. Assuming that there are no contraindications or potential for drug interactions, using lisinopril instead of captopril may be an appropriate way to limit pill burden.

== Interventions ==
The most common intervention to help people who are struggling with polypharmacy is deprescribing (reducing the number of medications prescribed, and identifying and discontinuing medications which now do more harm than good) Deprescribing is distinct from medication simplification, reducing the number of dose forms and administration times. This can commonly be done as an elderly patient becomes more frail and treatment needs to shift from preventative to palliative. Deprescribing is feasible and effective in many settings including residential care, communities and hospitals. Deprescribing should be considered when: (1) a new symptom or adverse event arises, (2) the person develops an end-stage disease, (3) the combination of drugs is risky, or (4) stopping the drug does not alter the disease trajectory.

Several tools exist to help physicians decide when to deprescribe and what medications can be added to a pharmaceutical regimen. The Beers Criteria and the STOPP/START criteria help identify medications that have the highest risk of adverse drug events (ADE) and drug-drug interactions. The Medication Appropriateness Tool for Comorbid Health conditions during Dementia As of 2016 (MATCH-D) is the only tool available specifically for people with dementia, and also cautions against polypharmacy and complex medication regimens.

Barriers faced by both physicians and patients have made it challenging to apply deprescribing strategies. For physicians, these include fear of consequences of deprescribing, the prescriber's own confidence in their skills and knowledge to deprescribe, reluctance to alter medications that are prescribed by other practitioners, the feasibility of deprescribing, lack of access to all of a patient's clinical notes, and the complexity of having multiple providers. For patients who are prescribed or require the medication, barriers include attitudes or beliefs about the medications, inability to communicate with physicians, fears and uncertainties surrounding deprescribing, and influence of physicians, family, and the media. Barriers can include other health professionals or carers, such as in residential care, believing that the medicines are required.

In people with multiple long-term conditions (multimorbidity) and polypharmacy deprescribing represents a complex challenge as clinical guidelines are usually developed for single conditions. In these cases tools and guidelines like the Beers Criteria and STOPP/START could be used safely by clinicians but not all patients might benefit from stopping their medication. There is a need for clarity about how much clinicians can do beyond the guidelines and the responsibility they need to take could help them prescribing and deprescribing for complex cases. Further factors that can help clinicians tailor their decisions to the individual are: access to detailed data on the people in their care (including their backgrounds and personal medical goals), discussing plans to stop a medicine already when it is first prescribed, and a good relationship that involves mutual trust and regular discussions on progress. Furthermore, longer appointments for prescribing and deprescribing would allow time explain the process of deprescribing, explore related concerns, and support making the right decisions.

The effectiveness of specific interventions to improve the appropriate use of polypharmacy such as pharmaceutical care and computerised decision support is unclear. This is due to low quality of current evidence surrounding these interventions. High quality evidence is needed to make any conclusions about the effects of such interventions in any environment, including in care homes. Deprescribing is not influenced by whether medicines are prescribed through a paper-based or an electronic system. Deprescribing rounds has been proposed as a potentially successful methodology in reducing polypharmacy. Sharing of positive outcomes from physicians who have implemented deprescribing, increased communication between all practitioners involved in patient care, higher compensation for time spent deprescribing, and clear deprescribing guidelines can help enable the practice of deprescribing. Despite the difficulties, a recent blinded study of deprescribing reported that participants used an average of two fewer medicines each after 12 months showing again that deprescribing is feasible.

== See also ==
- Adverse effect
- Classification of Pharmaco-Therapeutic Referrals
- Compliance
- Overmedication
- Deprescribing
- Multimorbidity
