= Nordazepam =

Benzodiazepine derivative medication

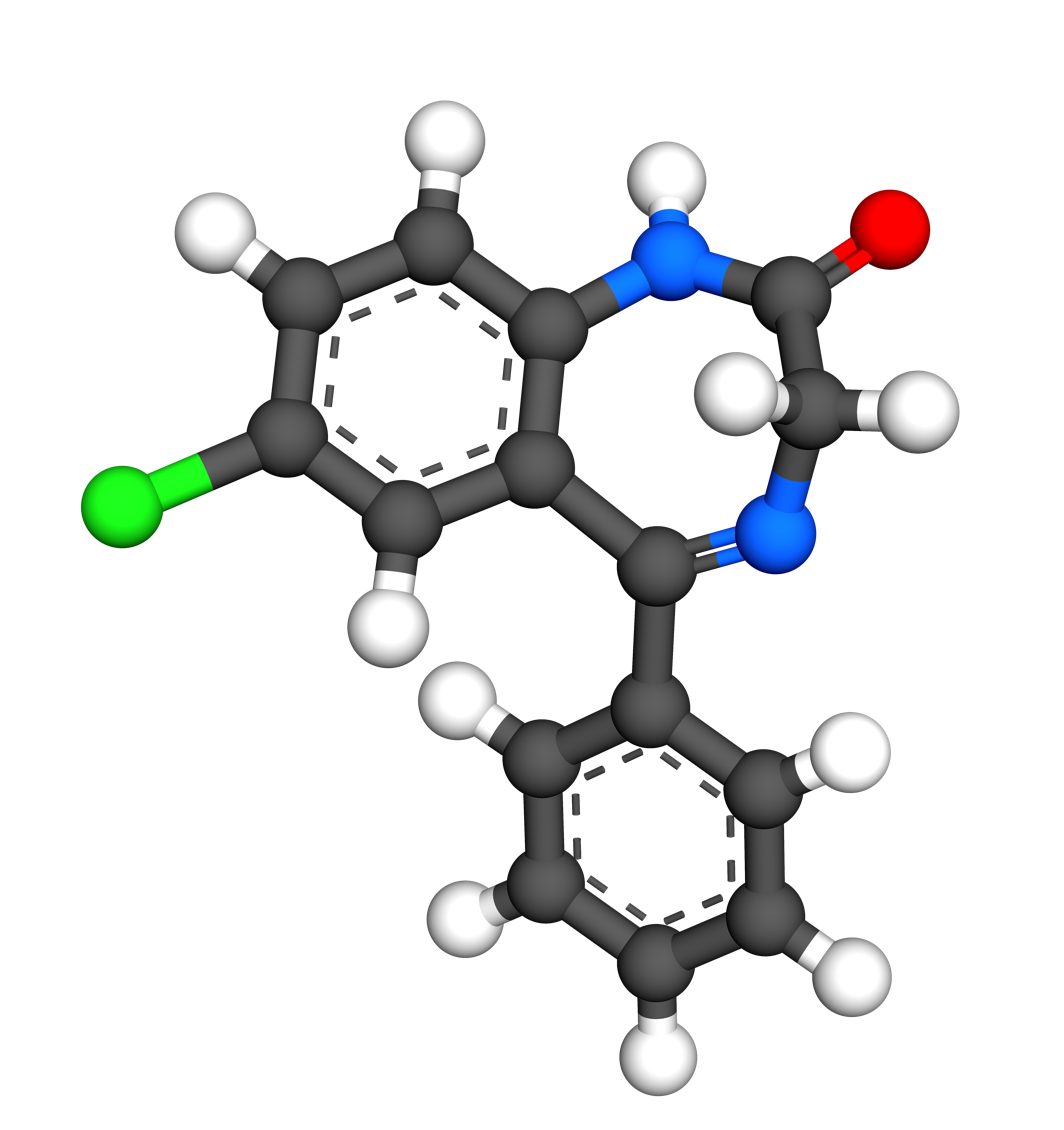

Clinical data
- Other names: Nordiazepam, desoxydemoxepam, desmethyldiazepam
- AHFS/Drugs.com: International Drug Names
- Pregnancy category: ?
- Routes of administration: Oral
- ATC code: N05BA16 (WHO)

Legal status
- Legal status: BR: Class B1 (Psychoactive drugs); CA: Schedule IV; DE: Prescription only (Anlage III for higher doses); US: Schedule IV

Pharmacokinetic data
- Bioavailability: ?
- Metabolism: Hepatic
- Elimination half-life: 36–200 hours
- Excretion: Renal

Identifiers
- IUPAC name: 7-Chloro-5-phenyl-1,3-dihydro-2H-1,4-benzodiazepin-2-one
- CAS Number: 1088-11-5
- PubChem CID: 2997
- DrugBank: DB14028
- ChemSpider: 2890
- UNII: 67220MCM01
- KEGG: D08283
- ChEBI: CHEBI:111762
- ChEMBL: ChEMBL523
- CompTox Dashboard (EPA): DTXSID2049000
- ECHA InfoCard: 100.012.840

Chemical and physical data
- Formula: C_{15}H_{11}ClN_{2}O
- Molar mass: 270.72 g·mol^{−1}
- 3D model (JSmol): Interactive image
- SMILES: ClC1=CC2=C(C=C1)NC(CN=C2C3=CC=CC=C3)=O
- InChI: InChI=1S/C15H11ClN2O/c16-11-6-7-13-12(8-11)15(17-9-14(19)18-13)10-4-2-1-3-5-10/h1-8H,9H2,(H,18,19); Key:AKPLHCDWDRPJGD-UHFFFAOYSA-N

Nordazepam (marketed under brand names Nordaz, Stilny, Madar, Vegesan, and Calmday; also known as nordiazepam, desoxydemoxepam, and desmethyldiazepam) is a 1,4-benzodiazepine derivative. Like other benzodiazepine derivatives, it has amnesic, anticonvulsant, anxiolytic, muscle relaxant, and sedative properties. However, it is used primarily in the treatment of anxiety disorders. It is an active metabolite of diazepam, chlordiazepoxide, clorazepate, prazepam, pinazepam, and medazepam.

Nordazepam is among the longest lasting (longest half-life) benzodiazepines, and its occurrence as a metabolite is responsible for most cumulative side-effects of its myriad pro-drugs when they are used repeatedly at moderate-high doses; the nordazepam metabolite oxazepam is also active (and is a more potent, full BZD-site agonist), which contributes to nordazepam cumulative side-effects but occur too minutely to contribute to the cumulative side-effects of nordazepam pro-drugs (except when they are abused chronically in extremely supra-therapeutic doses).

== Side effects ==
Common side effects of nordazepam include somnolence, which is more common in elderly patients and/or people on high-dose regimens. Hypotonia, which is much less common, is also associated with high doses and/or old age.

== Contraindications ==
Benzodiazepines require special precaution if used in the elderly, during pregnancy, in children, alcohol- or drug-dependent individuals, and individuals with comorbid psychiatric disorders. As with many other drugs, changes in liver function associated with aging or diseases such as cirrhosis, may lead to impaired clearance of nordazepam.

== Pharmacology ==
Nordazepam is a partial agonist at the GABA_{A} receptor, which makes it less potent than other benzodiazepines, particularly in its amnesic and muscle-relaxing effects. Its elimination half-life is between 36 and 200 hours, with wide variation among individuals; factors such as age and sex are known to impact it. The variation of reported half-lives are attributed to differences in nordazepam metabolism and that of its metabolites as nordazepam is hydroxylated to active metabolites such as oxazepam, before finally being glucuronidated and excreted in urine. This can be attributed to extremely variable hepatic and renal metabolic functions among individuals depending upon a number of factors (including age, ethnicity, disease, and current or previous use/abuse of other drugs/medicines).

== Chemistry ==
Nordazepam is similar to diazepam, except that the methyl group at the R1 position has been replaced with a hydrogen. Nordazepam can be synthesized with 2-amino-5-chlorobenzophenone and chloroacetyl chloride. Nordazepam itself can also be used in the synthesis of diazepam by methylating the R1 position using dimethyl sulfate.

== Pregnancy and nursing mothers ==
Nordazepam, like other benzodiazepines, easily crosses the placental barrier, so the drug should not be administered during the first trimester of pregnancy. In case of serious medical reasons, nordazepam can be given in late pregnancy, but the fetus, due to the pharmacological action of the drug, may experience side effects such as hypothermia, hypotonia, and sometimes mild respiratory depression. Since nordazepam and other benzodiazepines are excreted in breast milk, the substance should not be administered to mothers who are breastfeeding. Discontinuing of breast-feeding is indicated for regular intake by the mother.

== Recreational use ==
Nordazepam and other sedative–hypnotic drugs are detected frequently in cases of people suspected of driving under the influence of drugs. Many drivers have blood levels far exceeding the therapeutic dose range, suggesting benzodiazepines are commonly used in doses higher than the recommended doses.

== See also ==
- Benzodiazepine
- Benzodiazepine dependence
- Benzodiazepine withdrawal syndrome
- Long-term effects of benzodiazepines
- Clobazam (1,5-benzodiazepine and potent partial agonist)
