= Clorazepate =

Benzodiazepine medication

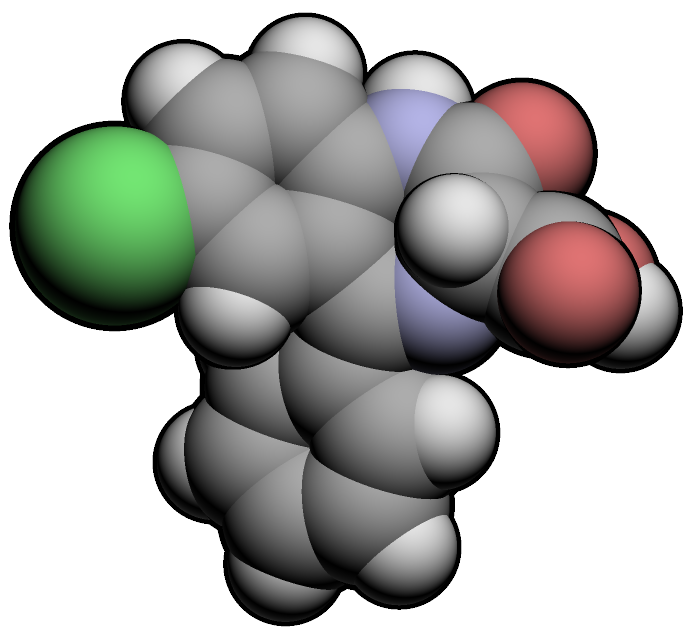

Clinical data
- Trade names: Tranxene, Novo-Clopate, others
- Other names: Clorazepate dipotassium
- AHFS/Drugs.com: Monograph
- MedlinePlus: a682052
- Routes of administration: Oral
- ATC code: N05BA05 (WHO)

Legal status
- Legal status: BR: Class B1 (Psychoactive drugs); CA: Schedule IV; DE: Prescription only (Anlage III for higher doses); UK: Class C; US: Schedule IV

Pharmacokinetic data
- Bioavailability: 91%
- Metabolism: Hepatic
- Elimination half-life: 48 hours
- Excretion: Renal

Identifiers
- IUPAC name: (RS)-7-Chloro-2,3-dihydro-2-oxo-5-phenyl-1H-1,4-benzodiazepine-3-carboxylic acid
- CAS Number: 23887-31-2 57109-90-7 (potassium salt)
- PubChem CID: 2809
- IUPHAR/BPS: 7548
- DrugBank: DB00628
- ChemSpider: 2707
- UNII: D51WO0G0L4
- KEGG: C06921; as potassium: D00694
- ChEMBL: ChEMBL1201305
- CompTox Dashboard (EPA): DTXSID20863674
- ECHA InfoCard: 100.041.737

Chemical and physical data
- Formula: C_{16}H_{11}ClN_{2}O_{3}
- Molar mass: 314.73 g·mol^{−1}
- 3D model (JSmol): Interactive image
- SMILES: O=C(O)C1N=C(c2ccccc2)c2cc(Cl)ccc2NC1=O
- InChI: InChI=1S/C16H11ClN2O3/c17-10-6-7-12-11(8-10)13(9-4-2-1-3-5-9)19-14(16(21)22)15(20)18-12/h1-8,14H,(H,18,20)(H,21,22); Key:XDDJGVMJFWAHJX-UHFFFAOYSA-N

Clorazepate, sold under the brand name Tranxene among others, is a benzodiazepine medication. It possesses anxiolytic, anticonvulsant, sedative, hypnotic, and skeletal muscle relaxant properties. Clorazepate is an unusually long-lasting benzodiazepine and serves as a prodrug for the equally long-lasting desmethyldiazepam, which is rapidly produced as an active metabolite. Desmethyldiazepam is responsible for most of the therapeutic effects of clorazepate.

It was patented in 1965 and approved for medical use in 1967.

== Medical uses ==
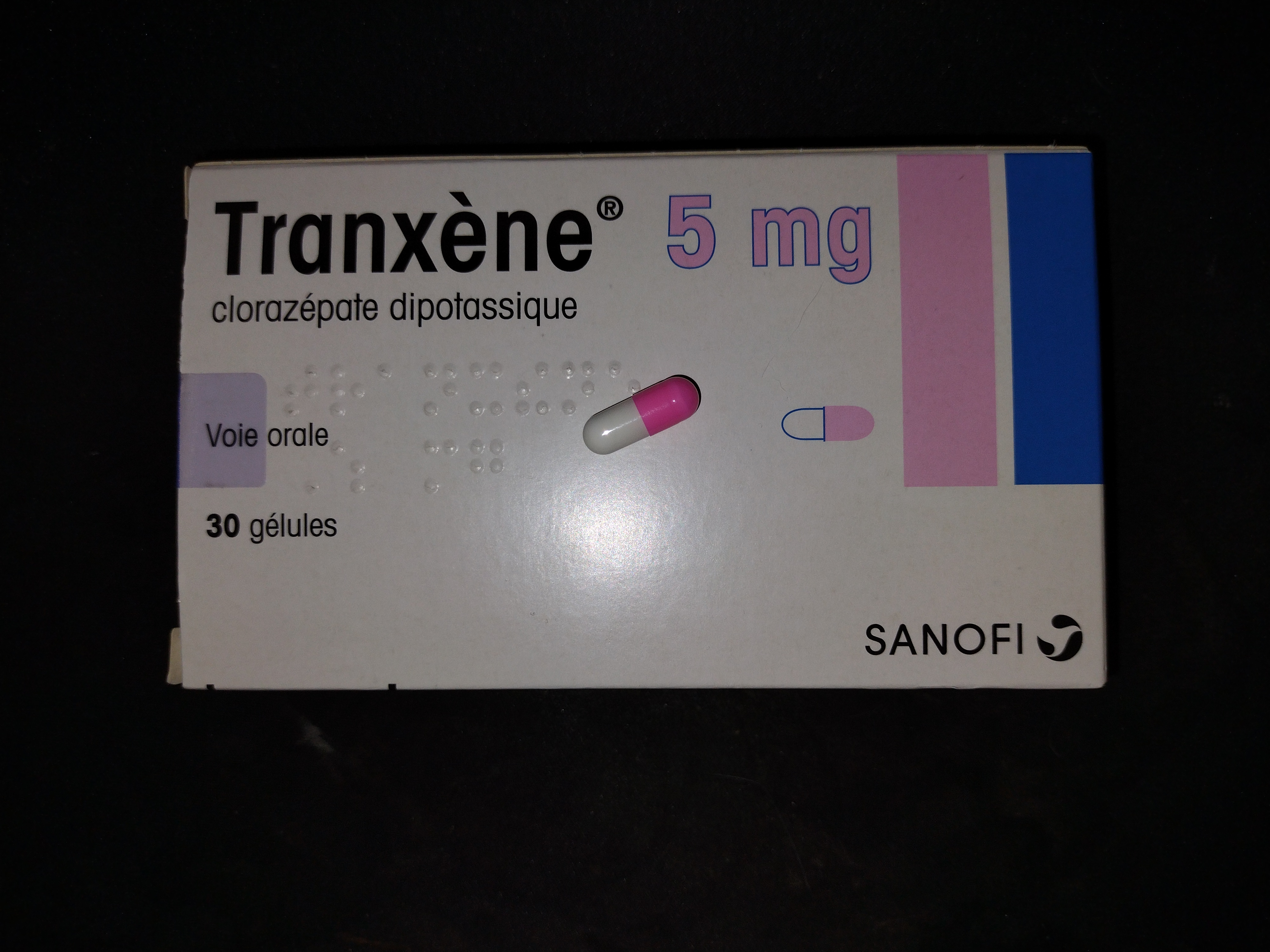
Clorazepate, sold under the name Tranxène, from France

Clorazepate is used in the treatment of anxiety disorders and insomnia. It may also be prescribed as an anticonvulsant or muscle relaxant. It is also used as a premedication.

Clorazepate is prescribed principally in the treatment of alcohol withdrawal and epilepsy, although it is also a useful anxiolytic because of its long half-life. The normal starting dosage range of clorazepate is 15 to 60 mg per day. The drug is to be taken two to four times per day. Dosages as high as 90 to 120 mg per day may be used in the treatment of acute alcohol withdrawal. In the United States and Canada, clorazepate is available in 3.75, 7.5, and 15 mg capsules or tablets. In Europe, tablet formations are 5 mg, 10 mg, 20 mg and 50 mg. Clorazepate SD (controlled release) is available and may have a reduced incidence of adverse effects. The sustained-release formulation of clorazepate has some advantages in that, if a dose is missed, less profound fluctuations in blood plasma levels occur, which may be helpful to some people with epilepsy at risk of break-through seizures.

== Adverse effects ==
Adverse effects of clorazepate include tolerance, dependence, withdrawal reactions, cognitive impairment, confusion, anterograde amnesia, falls in the elderly, ataxia, hangover effects, and drowsiness. It is unclear whether cognitive deficits resulting from the long-term use of benzodiazepines return to normal or persist indefinitely after withdrawal from benzodiazepines. Benzodiazepines are also known to cause or worsen depression. Paradoxical effects including excitement and paradoxical worsening of seizures can sometimes result from the use of benzodiazepines. Children, the elderly, individuals with a history of alcohol use disorder or a history of aggressive behavior and anger are at greater risk of developing paradoxical reactions to benzodiazepines.

In September 2020, the U.S. Food and Drug Administration (FDA) required the boxed warning be updated for all benzodiazepine medicines to describe the risks of non-medical use, addiction, physical dependence, and withdrawal reactions consistently across all the medicines in the class.

=== Tolerance, dependence and withdrawal ===
Delirium has been noted from discontinuation from clorazepate. A benzodiazepine dependence occurs in approximately one third of patients who take benzodiazepines for longer than 4 weeks, which is characterised by a withdrawal syndrome upon dose reduction. When used for seizure control, tolerance may manifest itself with an increased rate of seizures as well an increased risk of withdrawal seizures. In humans, tolerance to the anticonvulsant effects of clorazepate occurs frequently with regular use. Due to the development of tolerance, benzodiazepines are, in general, not considered appropriate for the long-term management of epilepsy; increasing the dose may result only in the developing of tolerance to the higher dose combined with worsened adverse effects. Cross-tolerance occurs between benzodiazepines, meaning that, if individuals are tolerant to one benzodiazepine, they will display a tolerance to equivalent doses of other benzodiazepines. Withdrawal symptoms from benzodiazepines include a worsening of pre-existing symptoms as well as the appearance of new symptoms that were not pre-existing. The withdrawal symptoms may range from mild anxiety and insomnia to severe withdrawal symptoms such as seizures and psychosis. Withdrawal symptoms can be difficult in some cases to differentiate between pre-existing symptoms and withdrawal symptoms. Use of high doses, long-term use and abrupt or over-rapid withdrawal increase the severity of withdrawal syndrome. However, tolerance to the active metabolite of clorazepate may occur more slowly than with other benzodiazepines. Regular use of benzodiazepines causes the development of dependence characterised by tolerance to the therapeutic effects of benzodiazepines and the development of the benzodiazepine withdrawal syndrome including symptoms such as anxiety, apprehension, tremor, insomnia, nausea, and vomiting upon cessation of benzodiazepine use. Withdrawal from benzodiazepines should be gradual as abrupt withdrawal from high doses of benzodiazepines may cause confusion, toxic psychosis, convulsions, or a condition resembling delirium tremens. Abrupt withdrawal from lower doses may cause depression, nervousness, rebound insomnia, irritability, sweating, and diarrhea.

== Interactions ==
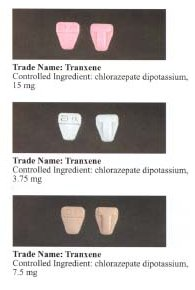

All sedatives or hypnotics, e.g., other benzodiazepines, barbiturates, antiepileptic drugs, alcohol, antihistamines, opioids, neuroleptics, sleep aids are likely to magnify the effects of clorazepate (and each other) on the central nervous system. Drugs that may interact with clorazepate include, digoxin, disulfiram, fluoxetine, isoniazid, ketoconazole, levodopa, metoprolol, hormonal contraceptives, probenecid, propranolol, rifampin, theophylline, valproic acid. Selective serotonin reuptake inhibitors, cimetidine, macrolide antibiotics and antimycotics inhibit the metabolism of benzodiazepines and may result in increased plasma levels with resultant enhancement of adverse effects. Phenytoin, phenobarbital, and carbamazepine have the opposite effect, with coadministration leading to increased metabolism and decreased therapeutic effects of clorazepate.

== Contraindications ==
Benzodiazepines require special precaution if used in the elderly, children, alcohol- or drug-dependent individuals and individuals with comorbid psychiatric disorders.

Clorazepate if used late in pregnancy, the third trimester, causes a definite risk of severe benzodiazepine withdrawal syndrome in the neonate with symptoms including hypotonia, and reluctance to suck, to apnoeic spells, cyanosis, and impaired metabolic responses to cold stress. Floppy infant syndrome and sedation in the newborn may also occur. Symptoms of floppy infant syndrome and the neonatal benzodiazepine withdrawal syndrome have been reported to persist from hours to months after birth.

== Pharmacology ==
Clorazepate is a "classical" benzodiazepine. Other classical benzodiazepines include chlordiazepoxide, diazepam, clonazepam, oxazepam, lorazepam, nitrazepam, bromazepam and flurazepam. Clorazepate is a long-acting benzodiazepine drug. Clorazepate produces the active metabolite desmethyl-diazepam, which is a partial agonist of the GABA_{A} receptor and has a half-life of 20–179 hours; a small amount of desmethyldiazepam is further metabolised into oxazepam. Clorazepate exerts its pharmacological properties via increasing the opening frequency of the chloride ion channel of GABA_{A} receptors. This effect of benzodiazepines requires the presence of the neurotransmitter GABA and results in enhanced inhibitory effects of the neurotransmitter GABA acting on GABA_{A} receptors. Clorazepate, like other benzodiazepines, is widely distributed and is highly bound to plasma proteins; clorazepate also crosses readily over the placenta and into breast milk. Peak plasma levels of the active metabolite desmethyl-diazepam are seen between 30 minutes and 2 hours after oral administration of clorazepate. Clorazepate is completely metabolised to desmethyl-diazepam in the gastrointestinal tract and thus the pharmacological properties of clorazepate are largely due to desmethyldiazepam.

== Chemistry ==
Clorazepate is used in the form of a dipotassium salt. It is unusual among benzodiazepines in that it is freely soluble in water.

Clorazepate can be synthesized starting from 2-amino-5-chlorobenzonitrile, which upon reaction with phenylmagnesium bromide is transformed into 2-amino-5-chlorbenzophenone imine. Reacting this with aminomalonic ester gives a heterocyclization product, 7-chloro-1,3-dihydro-3-carbethoxy-5-phenyl-2H-benzodiazepin-2-one. Upon hydrolysis using an alcoholic solution of potassium hydroxide forms a dipotassium salt, chlorazepate.

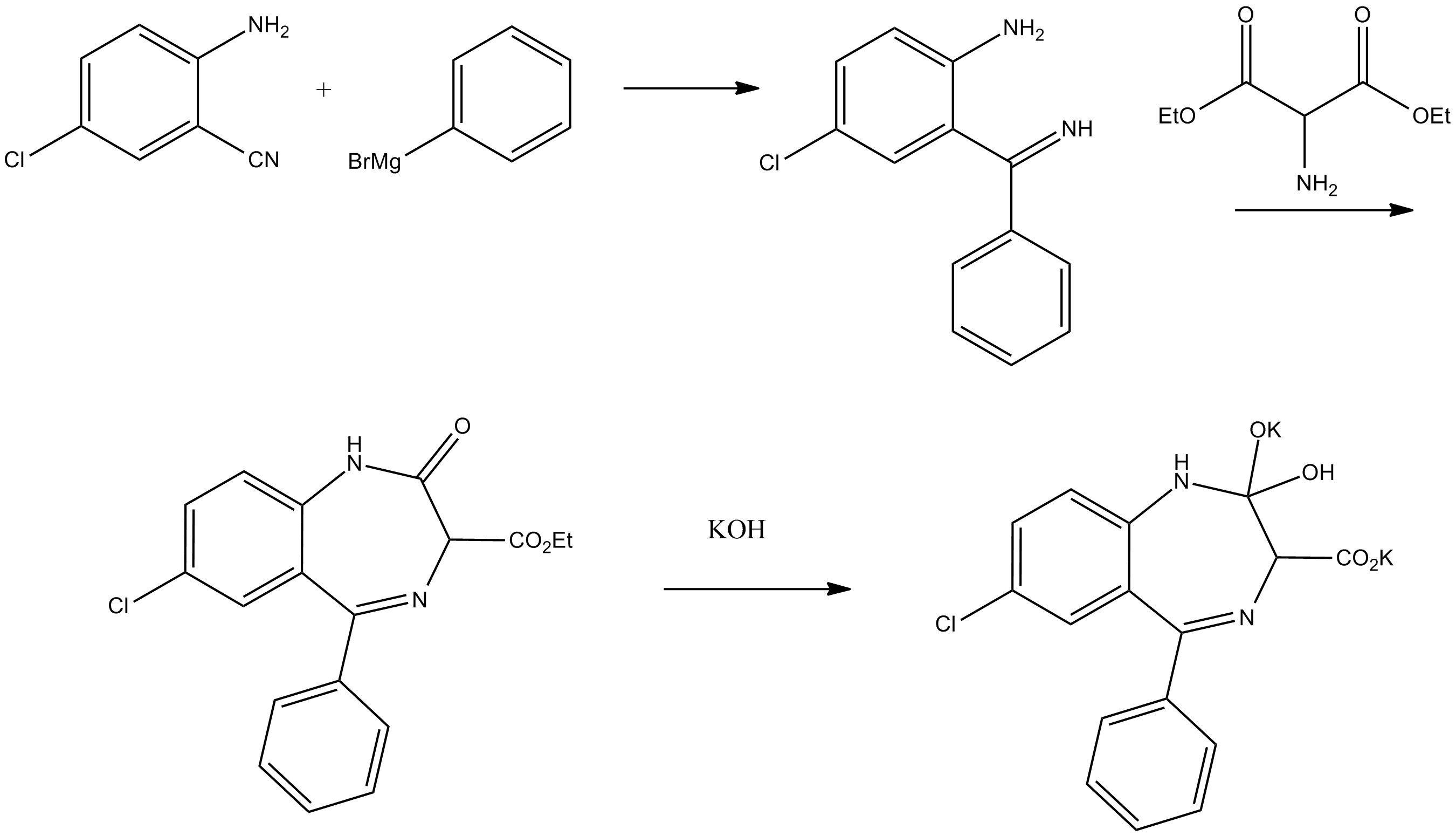

== Legal status ==
In the United States, clorazepate is listed under Schedule IV of the Controlled Substances Act.
