= Diazepam =

Benzodiazepine sedative

Clinical data
- Pronunciation: /daɪˈæzɪpæm/ dy-AZ-ip-am
- Trade names: Valium, others
- AHFS/Drugs.com: Monograph
- MedlinePlus: a682047
- License data: US DailyMed: Diazepam
- Pregnancy category: AU: C
- Dependence liability: High
- Addiction liability: Moderate
- Routes of administration: Oral, intramuscular, intravenous, rectal, intranasal, buccal
- Drug class: Benzodiazepine
- ATC code: N05BA01 (WHO)

Legal status
- Legal status: AU: S4 (Prescription only); BR: Class B1 (Psychoactive drugs); CA: Schedule IV; DE: Prescription only (Anlage III for higher doses); NZ: Class C5; UK: Class C; US: Schedule IV; UN: Psychotropic Schedule IV; EU: Rx-only; SE: Förteckning IV

Pharmacokinetic data
- Bioavailability: Oral: 76% (64–97%); Rectal: 81% (62–98%)
- Metabolism: Liver – CYP2B6 (minor route) to desmethyldiazepam, CYP2C19 (major route) to inactive metabolites, CYP3A4 (major route) to temazepam
- Metabolites: Temazepam; Oxazepam; Nordiazepam
- Onset of action: 15–60 minutes orally and 1–3 minutes IV
- Elimination half-life: (50 h); 20–100 h (32–200 h for main active metabolite desmethyldiazepam)
- Excretion: Kidney

Identifiers
- IUPAC name: 7-chloro-1-methyl-5-phenyl-3H-1,4-benzodiazepin-2-one
- CAS Number: 439-14-5
- PubChem CID: 3016
- IUPHAR/BPS: 3364
- DrugBank: DB00829
- ChemSpider: 2908
- UNII: Q3JTX2Q7TU
- KEGG: D00293
- ChEBI: CHEBI:49575
- ChEMBL: ChEMBL12
- CompTox Dashboard (EPA): DTXSID4020406
- ECHA InfoCard: 100.006.476

Chemical and physical data
- Formula: C_{16}H_{13}ClN_{2}O
- Molar mass: 284.74 g·mol^{−1}
- 3D model (JSmol): Interactive image
- SMILES: c1ccccc1C2=NCC(=O)N(C)c3ccc(Cl)cc23
- InChI: InChI=1S/C16H13ClN2O/c1-19-14-8-7-12(17)9-13(14)16(18-10-15(19)20)11-5-3-2-4-6-11/h2-9H,10H2,1H3; Key:AAOVKJBEBIDNHE-UHFFFAOYSA-N

Diazepam, sold under the brand name Valium among others, is a medication of the benzodiazepine family that acts as an anxiolytic. It is used to treat a range of conditions, including anxiety disorders, seizures, alcohol withdrawal syndrome, muscle spasms, insomnia, and restless legs syndrome. It may also be used to cause memory loss during certain medical procedures. It can be taken orally (by mouth), as a suppository (inserted into the rectum), intramuscularly (injected into muscle), intravenously (injection into a vein) or used as a nasal spray. When injected intravenously, effects begin in one to five minutes and last up to an hour. When taken by mouth, effects begin after 15 to 60 minutes.

Common side effects include sleepiness and trouble with coordination. Serious side effects are rare. They include increased risk of suicide, decreased breathing, and a paradoxical increased risk of seizures if used too frequently in those with epilepsy. Occasionally, excitement or agitation may occur. Long-term use can result in tolerance, dependence, and withdrawal symptoms on dose reduction. Abrupt stopping after long-term use can be potentially dangerous. After stopping, cognitive problems may persist for six months or longer. It is not recommended during pregnancy or breastfeeding. Its mechanism of action works by increasing the effect of the neurotransmitter gamma-aminobutyric acid (GABA).

Diazepam was patented in 1959 by Hoffmann-La Roche. It has been one of the most frequently prescribed medications in the world since its launch in 1963. In the United States it was the best-selling medication between 1968 and 1982, selling more than 2 billion tablets in 1978 alone. In 2023, it was the 183rd most commonly prescribed medication in the United States, with more than 2 million prescriptions. In 1985 the patent expired, and there are more than 500 brands available on the market. It is on the World Health Organization's List of Essential Medicines.

== Medical uses ==
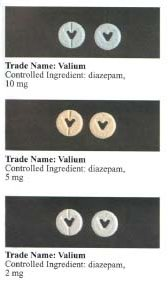
Diazepam tablets (10, 5, and 2 mg)

Diazepam is mainly used to treat anxiety, insomnia, panic attacks, and symptoms of acute alcohol withdrawal. It is also used as a premedication for inducing sedation, anxiolysis, or amnesia before certain medical procedures (e.g., endoscopy). In 2020, it was approved for use in the United States as a nasal spray to interrupt seizure activity in people with epilepsy. Diazepam is the most commonly used benzodiazepine for "tapering" benzodiazepine dependence due to diazepam's comparatively long half-life, allowing for more efficient dose reduction. Benzodiazepines have a relatively low toxicity in overdose.

Diazepam has several uses, including:

- Treatment of anxiety, panic attacks, and states of agitation
- Treatment of autonomic symptoms associated with vertigo
- Treatment of the symptoms of alcohol, opioid, and benzodiazepine withdrawal
- Short-term treatment of insomnia
- Treatment of muscle spasms
- Treatment of tetanus, together with other measures of intensive treatment
- Adjunctive treatment of spastic muscular paresis (paraplegia/tetraplegia) caused by cerebral or spinal cord conditions such as stroke, multiple sclerosis, or spinal cord injury (long-term treatment is coupled with other rehabilitative measures)
- Palliative treatment of stiff person syndrome
- Pre- or postoperative sedation, anxiolysis or amnesia (e.g., before endoscopic or surgical procedures)
- Treatment of complications with stimulant overdoses and psychosis, such as cocaine or methamphetamine
- Used in the treatment of organophosphate poisoning and reduces the risk of seizure-induced brain and cardiac damage.
- Preventive treatment of oxygen toxicity during hyperbaric oxygen therapy

Dosages are typically determined on an individual basis, depending on the condition being treated, the severity of symptoms, the patient's body weight, and any other conditions the person may have.

=== Seizures ===
Intravenous diazepam and lorazepam are first-line treatments for status epilepticus. However, intravenous lorazepam has advantages over intravenous diazepam, including a higher rate of terminating seizures and a more prolonged anticonvulsant effect. Diazepam gel was better than placebo gel in reducing the risk of non-cessation of seizures. Diazepam is rarely used for the long-term treatment of epilepsy because tolerance to its anticonvulsant effects usually develops within six to twelve months of treatment, effectively rendering it useless for that purpose.

The anticonvulsant effects of diazepam can help in the treatment of seizures due to a drug overdose or chemical toxicity as a result of exposure to sarin, VX, or soman (or other organophosphate poisons), lindane, chloroquine, physostigmine, or pyrethroids.

Diazepam is sometimes used intermittently for the prevention of febrile seizures that may occur in children under five years of age. Recurrence rates are reduced, but side effects are common, and the decision to treat febrile seizures (which are benign in nature) with medication uses these factors as part of the evaluation. Long-term use of diazepam for the management of epilepsy is not recommended; however, a subgroup of individuals with treatment-resistant epilepsy benefit from long-term benzodiazepines, and for such individuals, clorazepate has been recommended due to its slower onset of tolerance to the anticonvulsant effects.

=== Alcohol withdrawal ===
Because of its relatively long duration of action and evidence of safety and efficacy, diazepam is preferred over other benzodiazepines for the treatment of persons experiencing moderate to severe alcohol withdrawal. An exception to this is when a medication is required intramuscular in which case either lorazepam or midazolam is recommended.

=== Other ===
Diazepam is used for the emergency treatment of eclampsia when IV magnesium sulfate and blood-pressure control measures have failed. Benzodiazepines do not have any pain-relieving properties themselves and are generally recommended to be avoided in individuals with pain. However, benzodiazepines such as diazepam can be used for their muscle-relaxant properties to alleviate pain caused by muscle spasms and various dystonias, including blepharospasm. Tolerance often develops to the muscle relaxant effects of benzodiazepines such as diazepam. Baclofen is sometimes used as an alternative to diazepam.

=== Availability ===
Diazepam is marketed in over 500 brands throughout the world. It is supplied in oral, injectable, inhalation, and rectal forms.

The United States military employs a specialized diazepam preparation known as Convulsive Antidote, Nerve Agent (CANA), which contains diazepam. One CANA kit is typically issued to service members, along with three Mark I NAAK kits, when operating in circumstances where deployment of nerve agents is considered a potential hazard. Both of these kits deliver drugs using autoinjectors. They are intended for use in "buddy aid" or "self-aid" administration of the drugs in the field before decontamination and delivery of the patient to definitive medical care.

== Contraindications ==
Use of diazepam is avoided, when possible, in individuals with:

- Ataxia
- Severe hypoventilation
- Acute narrow-angle glaucoma
- Severe hepatic deficiencies (hepatitis and liver cirrhosis decrease elimination by a factor of two)
- Severe renal deficiencies (for example, patients on dialysis)
- Liver disorders
- Severe sleep apnea
- Severe depression, particularly when accompanied by suicidal tendencies
- Psychosis
- Pregnancy or breastfeeding
- Caution required in elderly or debilitated patients
- Coma or shock
- Abrupt discontinuation of therapy
- Acute intoxication with alcohol, narcotics, or other psychoactive substances (with the exception of hallucinogens or some stimulants, where it is occasionally used as a treatment for overdose)
- History of alcohol or drug dependence
- Myasthenia gravis, an autoimmune disorder causing marked fatiguability
- Hypersensitivity or allergy to any drug in the benzodiazepine class

=== Abuse and special populations ===
- Benzodiazepine abuse and misuse are guarded against when prescribed to those with alcohol or other drug dependencies or who have psychiatric disorders.
- Pediatric patients
  - For those less than 18 years of age, this treatment is usually not indicated, except for treatment of epilepsy, and pre-or postoperative treatment. The smallest possible effective dose is typically used for this group of patients.
  - Under 6 months of age, safety and effectiveness have not been established; diazepam is not given to those in this age group.
- Elderly and seriously ill patients can experience apnea or cardiac arrest. Concomitant use of other central nervous system depressants increases this risk. The smallest possible effective dose is generally used for this group of people. The elderly metabolize benzodiazepines much more slowly than younger adults, and are also more sensitive to the effects of benzodiazepines, even at similar blood plasma levels. Doses of diazepam are recommended to be about half of those given to younger people, and treatment is limited to a maximum of two weeks. Long-acting benzodiazepines such as diazepam are not recommended for the elderly. Diazepam can also be dangerous in geriatric patients owing to a significantly increased risk of falls.
- Intravenous or intramuscular injections in hypotensive people or those in shock are administered carefully, and vital signs are closely monitored.
- Benzodiazepines such as diazepam are lipophilic and rapidly penetrate membranes, thus rapidly cross over into the placenta with significant uptake of the drug. Use of benzodiazepines, including diazepam in late pregnancy, especially high doses, can result in floppy infant syndrome. Diazepam when taken late in pregnancy, during the third trimester, causes a definite risk of a severe benzodiazepine withdrawal syndrome in the neonate with symptoms including hypotonia, and reluctance to suck, to apnoeic spells, cyanosis, and impaired metabolic responses to cold stress. Floppy infant syndrome and sedation in the newborn may also occur. Symptoms of floppy infant syndrome and the neonatal benzodiazepine withdrawal syndrome have been reported to persist from hours to months after birth.

== Adverse effects ==
Benzodiazepines, such as diazepam, can cause anterograde amnesia, confusion, and sedation. The elderly are more prone to diazepam's confusion, amnesia, ataxia, hangover symptoms, and falls. Long-term use of benzodiazepines, such as diazepam, induces tolerance, dependency, and withdrawal syndrome. Like other benzodiazepines, diazepam impairs short-term memory and learning new information. Diazepam and other benzodiazepines can produce anterograde amnesia, but not retrograde amnesia, which means information learned before using benzodiazepines is not impaired. Short-term benzodiazepine use does not lead to tolerance, and the elderly are more sensitive to them. Additionally, after stopping benzodiazepines, cognitive problems may last at least six months; it is unclear if these problems last for longer than six months or are permanent. Benzodiazepines may also cause or worsen depression. Infusions or repeated intravenous injections of diazepam when managing seizures, for example, may lead to drug toxicity, including respiratory depression, sedation, and hypotension. Drug tolerance may also develop to infusions of diazepam if it is given for longer than 24 hours. Sedatives and sleeping pills, including diazepam, have been associated with an increased risk of death.

In September 2020, the U.S. Food and Drug Administration (FDA) required the boxed warning be updated for all benzodiazepine medicines to describe the risks of abuse, misuse, addiction, physical dependence, and withdrawal reactions consistently across all the medicines in the class.

Diazepam has a range of side effects common to most benzodiazepines, including:

- Suppression of REM sleep and slow wave sleep
- Impaired motor function
  - Impaired coordination
  - Impaired balance
  - Dizziness
- Reflex tachycardia

Less commonly, paradoxical reactions can occur, including nervousness, irritability, excitement, worsening of seizures, insomnia, muscle cramps, changes in libido, and in some cases, rage and violence. These adverse reactions are more likely to occur in children, the elderly, and individuals with a history of a substance use disorder, such as an alcohol use disorder, or a history of aggressive behavior. In some people, diazepam may increase the propensity toward self-harming behavior and, in extreme cases, may provoke suicidal tendencies or acts. Very rarely dystonia can occur.

Diazepam may impair the ability to drive vehicles or operate machinery. The impairment is worsened by the consumption of alcohol because both act as central nervous system depressants.

During therapy, tolerance to the sedative effects usually develops, but not to the anxiolytic and myorelaxant effects.

Patients with severe attacks of apnea during sleep may experience respiratory depression (hypoventilation), leading to respiratory arrest and death.

Diazepam in doses of 5 mg or more causes significant deterioration in alertness performance combined with increased feelings of sleepiness.

=== Tolerance and withdrawal ===
Diazepam, as with other benzodiazepine drugs, can cause tolerance, physical dependence, substance use disorder, and benzodiazepine withdrawal syndrome. Withdrawal from diazepam or other benzodiazepines often leads to withdrawal symptoms similar to those seen during barbiturate or alcohol withdrawal. The higher the dose and the longer the drug is taken, the greater the risk of experiencing unpleasant withdrawal symptoms.

Withdrawal symptoms can occur from standard dosages and also after short-term use, and can range from insomnia and anxiety to more serious symptoms, including seizures and psychosis. Withdrawal symptoms can sometimes resemble pre-existing conditions and be misdiagnosed. Diazepam may produce less intense withdrawal symptoms due to its long elimination half-life.

Benzodiazepine treatment is recommended to be discontinued as soon as possible by a slow and gradual dose reduction regimen. Tolerance develops to the therapeutic effects of benzodiazepines; for example, tolerance occurs to the anticonvulsant effects and as a result benzodiazepines are not generally recommended for the long-term management of epilepsy. Dose increases may overcome the effects of tolerance, but tolerance may then develop to the higher dose, and adverse effects may increase. The mechanism of tolerance to benzodiazepines includes uncoupling of receptor sites, alterations in gene expression, down-regulation of receptor sites, and desensitization of receptor sites to the effect of GABA. About one-third of individuals who take benzodiazepines for longer than four weeks become dependent and experience withdrawal syndrome on cessation.

Differences in withdrawal rates (50–100%) vary depending on the patient sample. For example, a random sample of long-term benzodiazepine users typically finds around 50% experience few or no withdrawal symptoms, with the other 50% experiencing notable withdrawal symptoms. Certain select patient groups show a higher rate of notable withdrawal symptoms, up to 100%.

Rebound anxiety, more severe than baseline anxiety, is also a common withdrawal symptom when discontinuing diazepam or other benzodiazepines. Diazepam is therefore only recommended for short-term therapy at the lowest possible dose owing to risks of severe withdrawal problems from low doses even after gradual reduction. The risk of pharmacological dependence on diazepam is significant, and patients experience symptoms of benzodiazepine withdrawal syndrome if it is taken for six weeks or longer. In humans, tolerance to the anticonvulsant effects of diazepam occurs frequently.

=== Dependence ===
Improper or excessive use of diazepam can lead to dependence. At a particularly high risk for diazepam misuse, substance use disorder, or dependence are:

- People with a history of a substance use disorder or substance dependence. Research suggests that diazepam may increase motivation for alcohol consumption and cravings in some individuals with a history of problematic drinking.
- People with severe personality disorders, such as borderline personality disorder.

Patients from the aforementioned groups are monitored closely during therapy for signs of abuse and the development of dependence. Therapy is recommended to be discontinued if any of these signs are noted. If dependence has developed, therapy is still discontinued gradually to avoid severe withdrawal symptoms. Long-term therapy in such instances is not recommended.

People suspected of being dependent on benzodiazepine drugs are gradually tapered off the drug. Withdrawals can be life-threatening, particularly when excessive doses have been taken for extended periods. Therefore, equal prudence is used whether dependence has occurred in therapeutic or recreational contexts.

Diazepam is seen as a good choice for tapering for those using high doses of other benzodiazepines since it has a long half-life, thus withdrawal symptoms are tolerable. The process is slow (usually from 14 to 28 weeks) but is considered safe when done appropriately.

== Overdose ==
An individual who has consumed too much diazepam typically displays one or more of these symptoms in approximately four hours immediately following a suspected overdose:

- Drowsiness
- Mental confusion
- Hypotension
- Impaired motor function
  - Impaired reflexes
  - Impaired coordination
  - Impaired balance
  - Dizziness
- Coma

Although not usually fatal when taken alone, a diazepam overdose is considered a medical emergency and generally requires the immediate attention of medical personnel. The antidote for an overdose of diazepam (or any other benzodiazepine) is flumazenil (Anexate). This drug is used only in cases with severe respiratory depression or cardiovascular complications. Because flumazenil is a short-acting drug, and the effects of diazepam can last for days, several doses of flumazenil may be necessary. Artificial respiration and stabilization of cardiovascular functions may also be necessary. Though not routinely indicated, activated charcoal can be used for decontamination of the stomach following a diazepam overdose. Emesis is contraindicated. Dialysis is minimally effective. Hypotension may be treated with levarterenol or metaraminol.

The oral LD_{50} (lethal dose in 50% of the population) of diazepam is 720 mg/kg in mice and 1240 mg/kg in rats. D. J. Greenblatt and colleagues reported in 1978 on two patients who had taken 500 mg and 2000 mg of diazepam, respectively, went into moderately deep comas, and were discharged within 48 hours without having experienced any important complications, despite having high concentrations of diazepam and its metabolites desmethyldiazepam, oxazepam, and temazepam, according to samples taken in the hospital and as follow-up.

Overdoses of diazepam with alcohol, opiates, or other depressants may be fatal.

== Interactions ==
If diazepam is administered concomitantly with other drugs, it is recommended that attention be paid to the possible pharmacological interactions. Particular care is taken with drugs that potentiate the effects of diazepam, such as barbiturates, phenothiazines, opioids, and antidepressants.

Diazepam does not increase or decrease hepatic enzyme activity and does not alter the metabolism of other compounds. No evidence has suggested that diazepam alters its metabolism with chronic administration.

Agents with an effect on hepatic cytochrome P450 pathways or conjugation can alter the rate of diazepam metabolism. These interactions would be expected to be most significant with long-term diazepam therapy, and their clinical significance is variable.

- Diazepam increases the central depressive effects of alcohol, other hypnotics/sedatives (e.g., barbiturates), other muscle relaxants, certain antidepressants, sedative antihistamines, opioids, and antipsychotics, as well as anticonvulsants such as phenobarbital, phenytoin, and carbamazepine. The euphoriant effects of opioids may be increased, leading to an increased risk of psychological dependence.
- Cimetidine, omeprazole, oxcarbazepine, ticlopidine, topiramate, ketoconazole, itraconazole, disulfiram, fluvoxamine, isoniazid, erythromycin, probenecid, propranolol, imipramine, ciprofloxacin, fluoxetine, and valproic acid prolong the action of diazepam by inhibiting its elimination.
- Alcohol in combination with diazepam may cause a synergistic enhancement of the hypotensive properties of benzodiazepines and alcohol.
- Oral contraceptives significantly decrease the elimination of desmethyldiazepam, a major metabolite of diazepam.
- Rifampin, phenytoin, carbamazepine, and phenobarbital increase the metabolism of diazepam, thus decreasing drug levels and effects. Dexamethasone and St John's wort also increase the metabolism of diazepam.
- Diazepam increases the serum levels of phenobarbital.
- Nefazodone can cause increased blood levels of benzodiazepines.
- Cisapride may enhance the absorption, and therefore the sedative activity, of diazepam.
- Small doses of theophylline may inhibit the action of diazepam.
- Diazepam may block the action of levodopa (used in the treatment of Parkinson's disease).
- Diazepam may alter digoxin serum concentrations.
- Other drugs that may have interactions with diazepam include antipsychotics (e.g. chlorpromazine), MAO inhibitors, and ranitidine.
- Because it acts on the GABA receptor, the herb valerian may produce an adverse effect.
- Foods that acidify the urine can lead to faster absorption and elimination of diazepam, reducing drug levels and activity.
- Foods that alkalinize the urine can lead to slower absorption and elimination of diazepam, increasing drug levels and activity.
- Reports conflict as to whether food in general has any effects on the absorption and activity of orally administered diazepam.

== Pharmacology ==
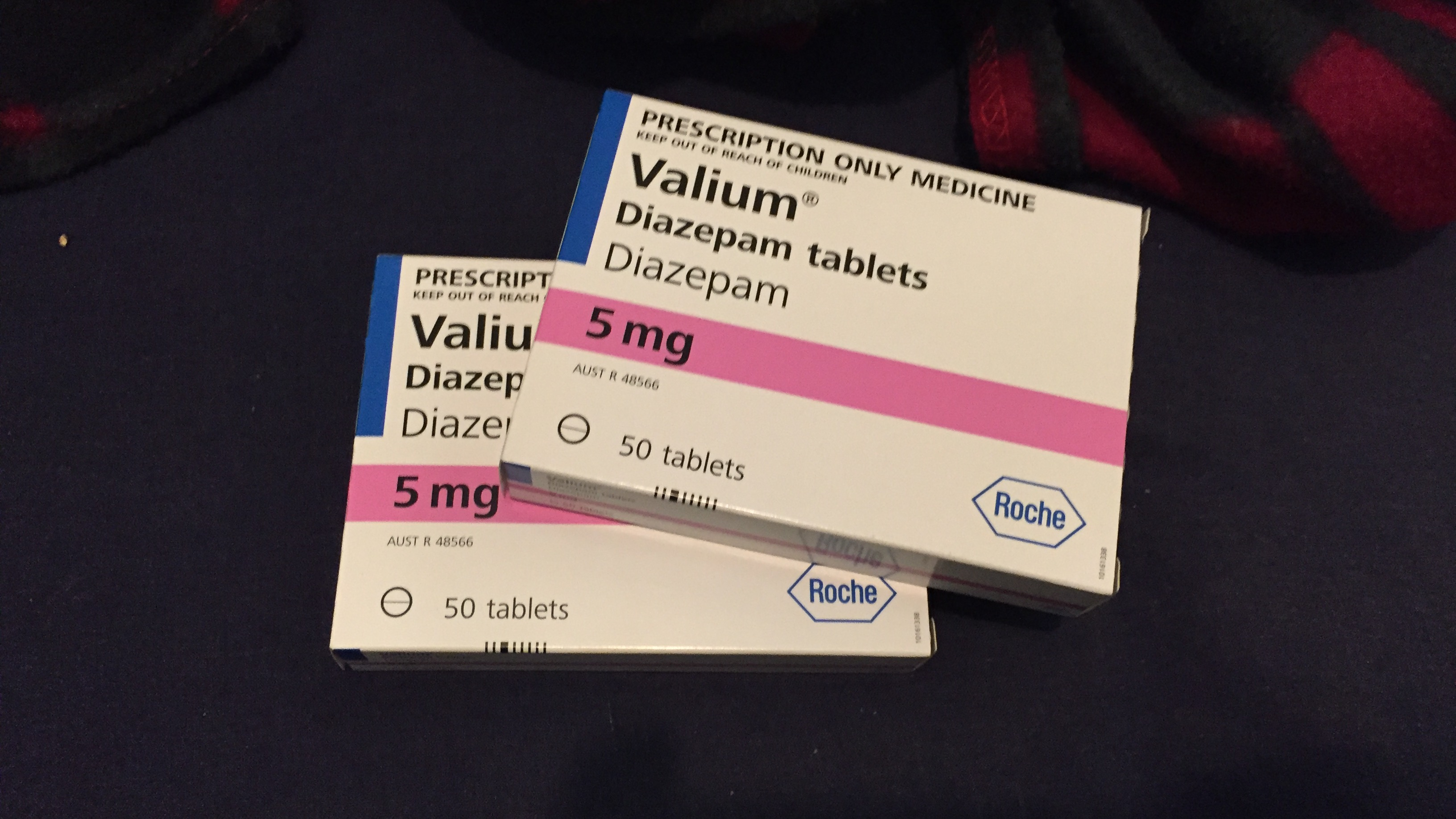
5 mg Valium Roche packaging Australia

Diazepam is a long-acting "classical" benzodiazepine. Other classical benzodiazepines include chlordiazepoxide, clonazepam, lorazepam, oxazepam, nitrazepam, temazepam, flurazepam, bromazepam, and clorazepate. Diazepam has anticonvulsant properties. Benzodiazepines act via micromolar benzodiazepine binding sites as calcium channel blockers and significantly inhibit depolarization-sensitive calcium uptake in rat nerve cell preparations.

Diazepam inhibits acetylcholine release in mouse hippocampal synaptosomes. This has been found by measuring sodium-dependent high-affinity choline uptake in mouse brain cells in vitro, after pretreatment of the mice with diazepam in vivo. This may play a role in explaining diazepam's anticonvulsant properties.

Diazepam binds with high affinity to glial cells in animal cell cultures. Diazepam at high doses has been found to decrease histamine turnover in mouse brain via diazepam's action at the benzodiazepine-GABA receptor complex. Diazepam also decreases prolactin release in rats.

=== Mechanism of action ===
Benzodiazepines are positive allosteric modulators of the GABA type A receptors (GABA_{A}). The GABA_{A} receptors are ligand-gated chloride-selective ion channels that are activated by GABA, the major inhibitory neurotransmitter in the brain. The binding of benzodiazepines to this receptor complex promotes the binding of GABA, which in turn increases the total conduction of chloride ions across the neuronal cell membrane. This increased chloride ion influx hyperpolarizes the neuron's membrane potential. As a result, the difference between resting potential and threshold potential is increased, and firing is less likely. As a result, the arousal of the cortical and limbic systems in the central nervous system is reduced.

The GABA_{A} receptor is a heteromer composed of five subunits, the most common ones being two αs, two βs, and one γ (α2β2γ). For each subunit, many subtypes exist (α1–6, β1–3, and γ1–3). GABA_{A} receptors containing the α1 subunit mediate the sedative, anterograde amnesic, and partly the anticonvulsive effects of diazepam. GABA_{A} receptors containing α2 mediate the anxiolytic actions and, to a large degree, the myorelaxant effects. GABA_{A} receptors containing α3 and α5 also contribute to benzodiazepines myorelaxant actions, whereas GABA_{A} receptors comprising the α5 subunit were shown to modulate the temporal and spatial memory effects of benzodiazepines. Diazepam is not the only drug to target these GABA_{A} receptors. Drugs such as flumazenil also bind to GABA_{A} to induce their effects.

Diazepam appears to act on areas of the limbic system, thalamus, and hypothalamus, inducing anxiolytic effects. Benzodiazepine drugs, including diazepam, increase the inhibitory processes in the cerebral cortex.

The anticonvulsant properties of diazepam and other benzodiazepines may be in part or entirely due to binding to voltage-dependent sodium channels rather than GABA_{A} receptors. Sustained repetitive firing seems limited by benzodiazepines' effect of slowing recovery of sodium channels from inactivation.

The muscle relaxant properties of diazepam are produced via inhibition of polysynaptic pathways in the spinal cord.

=== Pharmacokinetics ===
Diazepam can be administered orally, intravenously (it is always diluted, as it is painful and damaging to veins), intramuscularly (IM), or as a suppository.

The onset of action is one to five minutes for IV administration and 15–30 minutes for IM administration. The duration of diazepam's peak pharmacological effects is 15 minutes to one hour for both routes of administration. The half-life of diazepam, in general, is 30–56 hours. Peak plasma levels occur between 30 and 90 minutes after oral administration and between 30 and 60 minutes after intramuscular administration; after rectal administration, peak plasma levels occur after 10 to 45 minutes. Diazepam is highly plasma protein-bound, with 96–99% of the absorbed drug being protein-bound. The distribution half-life of diazepam is two to 13 minutes.

Diazepam is highly lipid-soluble and is widely distributed throughout the body after administration. It easily crosses both the blood–brain barrier and the placenta, and is excreted into breast milk. After absorption, diazepam is redistributed into muscle and adipose tissue. Continual daily doses of diazepam quickly build to a high concentration in the body (mainly in adipose tissue), far above the actual dose for any given day.

Diazepam is stored preferentially in some organs, including the heart. Absorption by any administered route and the risk of accumulation is significantly increased in the neonate, and withdrawal of diazepam during pregnancy and breastfeeding is clinically justified.

Diazepam undergoes oxidative metabolism by demethylation (CYP2C9, 2C19, 2B6, 3A4, and 3A5), hydroxylation (CYP3A4 and 2C19) and glucuronidation in the liver as part of the cytochrome P450 enzyme system. It has several pharmacologically active metabolites. The main active metabolite of diazepam is desmethyldiazepam (also known as nordazepam or nordiazepam). Its other active metabolites include the minor active metabolites temazepam and oxazepam. These metabolites are conjugated with glucuronide and are excreted primarily in the urine. Because of these active metabolites, the serum values of diazepam alone are not useful in predicting the effects of the drug. Diazepam has a biphasic half-life of about one to three days and two to seven days for the active metabolite desmethyldiazepam. Most of the drug is metabolized; little diazepam is excreted unchanged. The elimination half-life of diazepam and also the active metabolite desmethyldiazepam increases significantly in the elderly, which may result in prolonged action, as well as accumulation of the drug during repeated administration.

=== Synthesis ===
The synthesis of diazepam was first achieved through a reaction pathway developed by Leo Sternbach and his team at Hoffmann-La Roche in the late 1950s.

Sternbach's method commenced with 2-amino-5-chlorobenzophenone, which undergoes cyclocondensation with glycine ethyl ester hydrochloride to construct the benzodiazepine core. This core is subsequently alkylated at the nitrogen in the 1-position using dimethyl sulfate in the presence of sodium methoxide and methanol under reflux conditions. Although the direct transformation from 2-amino-5-chlorobenzophenone to Nordazepam is conceptually straightforward, an alternative approach involving the treatment of 2-amino-5-chlorobenzophenone with chloroacetyl chloride, succeeded by ammoniation and heating, culminates in Nordazepam with enhanced yield and facilitates easier purification processes.

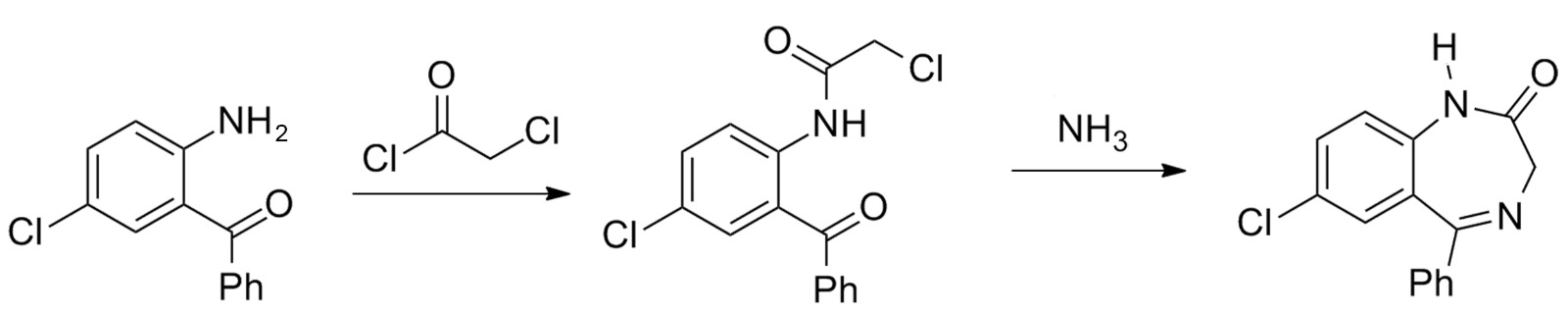

=== Detection in body fluids ===
Diazepam may be quantified in blood or plasma to confirm a diagnosis of poisoning in hospitalized patients, provide evidence in an impaired driving arrest, or assist in a medicolegal death investigation. Blood or plasma diazepam concentrations are usually in a range of 0.1–1.0 mg/L in persons receiving the drug therapeutically. Most commercial immunoassays for the benzodiazepine class of drugs cross-react with diazepam, but confirmation and quantitation are usually performed using chromatographic techniques.

=== Environmental ===
Diazepam is a common environmental contamination finding near human settlements.

== Chemistry ==
Diazepam does not possess any chiral centers in its structure, but it does have two conformers: the 'P'-conformer and 'M'-conformer. Diazepam is an equimolar mixture, and it was shown through CD spectra in serum protein solutions that the 'P'-conformer is preferred by α1-acid glycoprotein binding.

The drug diazepam occurs as a pale yellow-white crystalline powder without a distinctive smell and has a low molecular weight (MW = 284.74 g/mol). This classic aryl 1,4-benzodiazepine possesses three acceptors and no hydrogen bond donors. Diazepam is moderately lipophilic with LogP (Octanol-Water Partition Coefficient) value of 2,82 and hydrophilic with a TPSA (Topological Polar Surface Area) value of 32.7 Å². The LogP value indicates that diazepam tends to dissolve more readily in lipid-based environments, such as chloroform, acetone, ethanol and ether, compared to water. The TPSA value implies that a segment of the molecule exhibits a degree of polarity or hydrophilicity and represents the collective surface area of polar atoms, like oxygen or nitrogen, along with their connected hydrogen atoms. A TPSA value of 32,7 Å² signifies a moderate level of polarity within the compound. TPSA is especially useful in medical chemistry as it shows the ability of a molecule to permeate cells. Molecules with a PSA value smaller than 60–70 Å² have a better ability to permeate cells. The balance between its lipophilic and hydrophilic characteristics can impact various aspects of the molecule's behavior, including its solubility, absorption, distribution, metabolism, and potential interactions within the biological system.

Diazepam is overall a stable molecule. The British Pharmacopoeia lists it as being very slightly soluble in water, soluble in alcohol, and freely soluble in chloroform. The United States Pharmacopoeia lists diazepam as soluble 1 in 16 ethyl alcohol, 1 in 2 of chloroform, 1 in 39 ether, and practically insoluble in water. The pH of diazepam is neutral (i.e., pH = 7). Diazepam has a shelf life of five years for oral tablets and three years for IV/IM solutions.Diazepam is stored at room temperature (15–30 °C). The solution for parenteral injection is kept so that it is protected from light and kept from freezing. The oral forms are stored in air-tight containers and protected from light.

Diazepam can be absorbed into plastics, so liquid preparations are not kept in plastic bottles or syringes, etc. As such, it can leach into the plastic bags and tubing used for intravenous infusions. Absorption appears to depend on several factors, such as temperature, concentration, flow rates, and tube length. Diazepam should not be administered if a precipitate has formed and does not dissolve.

== History ==
Diazepam was the second benzodiazepine invented by Leo Sternbach of Hoffmann-La Roche at the company's Nutley, New Jersey, facility following chlordiazepoxide (Librium), which was approved for use in 1960. Released in 1963 as an improved version of Librium, diazepam became incredibly popular, helping Roche to become a pharmaceutical industry giant. It is 2.5 times more potent than its predecessor, which it quickly surpassed in terms of sales. After this initial success, other pharmaceutical companies began to introduce other benzodiazepine derivatives.

Medical professionals adopted the benzodiazepines as an improvement over barbiturates, which have a comparatively narrow therapeutic index, and are far more sedative at therapeutic doses. The benzodiazepines are also far less dangerous; death rarely results from diazepam overdose, except in cases where it is consumed with large amounts of other depressants (such as alcohol or opioids). Benzodiazepine drugs such as diazepam initially had widespread public support, but with time the view changed to one of growing criticism and calls for restrictions on their prescription.

Marketed by Roche using an advertising campaign conceived by the William Douglas McAdams Agency under the leadership of Arthur Sackler, diazepam was the top-selling pharmaceutical in the United States from 1969 to 1982, with peak annual sales in 1978 of 2.3 billion tablets. Diazepam, along with oxazepam, nitrazepam and temazepam, represents 82% of the benzodiazepine market in Australia. While psychiatrists continue to prescribe diazepam for the short-term relief of anxiety, neurology has taken the lead in prescribing diazepam for the palliative treatment of certain types of epilepsy and spastic activity, for example, forms of paresis. It is also the first line of defense for a rare disorder called stiff-person syndrome.

== Society and culture ==
=== Recreational use ===
Diazepam is a medication with a high risk of misuse and can cause drug dependence. Some pharmacologists recommend urgent action by national governments to improve prescribing patterns of benzodiazepines such as diazepam. A single dose of diazepam modulates the dopamine system in similar ways to how morphine and alcohol modulate the dopaminergic pathways. Between 50 and 64% of rats will self-administer diazepam. Diazepam can substitute for the behavioral effects of barbiturates in a primate study. Diazepam has been found as an adulterant in heroin.

Diazepam drug misuse can occur either through recreational misuse, where the drug is taken to achieve a high, or when the drug is continued long term against medical advice.

Sometimes, it is used by stimulant users to "come down" and sleep and to help control the urge to binge. These users often escalate dosage from 2 to 25 times the therapeutic dose of 5 mg to 10 mg.

A large-scale study in the US, conducted by SAMHSA, using data from 2011, determined that benzodiazepines were present in 28.7% of emergency department visits involving nonmedical use of pharmaceuticals. In this regard, benzodiazepines are second only to opiates, the study found in 39.2% of visits. About 29.3% of drug-related suicide attempts involve benzodiazepines, making them the most frequently represented class in drug-related suicide attempts. Males misuse benzodiazepines as commonly as females.

Diazepam was detected in 26% of cases of people suspected of driving under the influence of drugs in Sweden, and its active metabolite nordazepam, was detected in 28% of cases. Other drugs, zolpidem, and zopiclone were also found in high numbers. Many drivers had blood levels far exceeding the therapeutic dose range, suggesting a high degree of potential for misuse of the drugs zolpidem, and zopiclone. In Northern Ireland, in cases where drugs were detected in samples from impaired drivers who were not impaired by alcohol, benzodiazepines were found in 87% of cases. Diazepam was the most commonly detected benzodiazepine.

=== Legal status ===
Diazepam is regulated as a prescription medication.

==== International ====
Diazepam is a Schedule IV controlled drug under the Convention on Psychotropic Substances.

==== UK ====
Classified as a controlled drug, listed under Schedule IV, Part I (CD Benz POM) of the Misuse of Drugs Regulations 2001, allowing possession with a valid prescription. The Misuse of Drugs Act 1971 makes it illegal to possess the drug without a prescription, and for such purposes, it is classified as a Class C drug.

==== Germany ====
Classified as a prescription drug, or in high dosage as a restricted drug (Betäubungsmittelgesetz, Anlage III).

==== Australia ====
Diazepam is a Schedule 4 substance under the Poisons Standard (June 2018). A Schedule 4 drug is outlined in the Poisons Act 1964 as, "Substances, the use or supply of which should be by or on the order of persons permitted by State or Territory legislation to prescribe and should be available from a pharmacist on prescription".

==== United States ====
Diazepam is controlled as a Schedule IV substance.

The states of California and Florida offer diazepam to condemned inmates as a pre-execution sedative as part of their lethal injection program. The state of California has not executed a prisoner since 2006. In August 2018, Nebraska used diazepam as part of the drug combination used to execute Carey Dean Moore, the first death row inmate executed in Nebraska in over 21 years.

== Veterinary uses ==
Diazepam is used as a short-term sedative and anxiolytic for cats and dogs, sometimes used as an appetite stimulant. It can also be used to stop seizures in dogs and cats.
