= Lorazepam =

Benzodiazepine medication

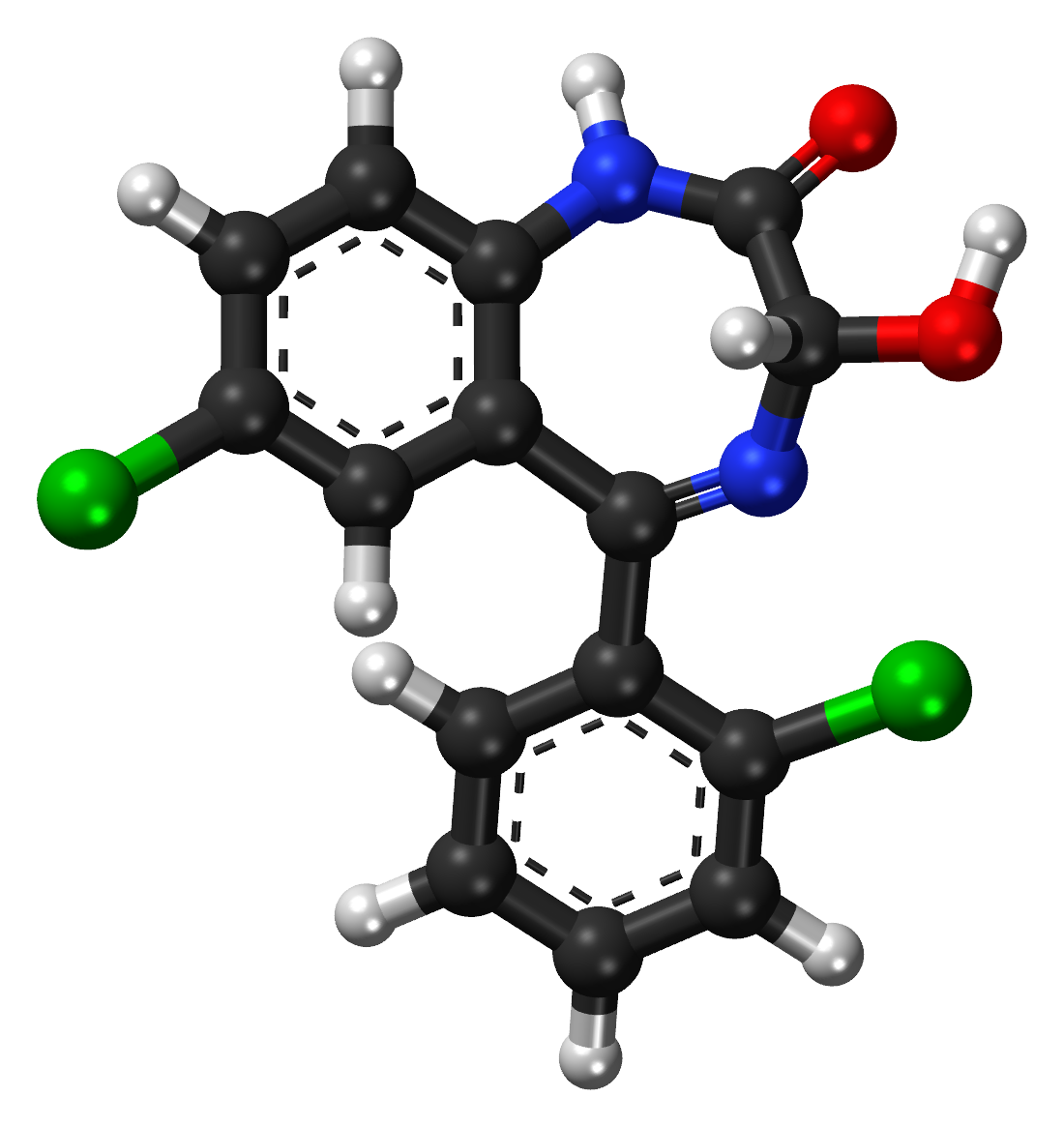

Clinical data
- Trade names: Ativan, others
- Other names: o-Chloroxazepam
- AHFS/Drugs.com: Monograph
- MedlinePlus: a682053
- License data: US DailyMed: Lorazepam
- Pregnancy category: AU: C
- Dependence liability: High
- Addiction liability: Moderate
- Routes of administration: By mouth, intramuscular, intravenous, transdermal
- Drug class: Benzodiazepine
- ATC code: N05BA06 (WHO)

Legal status
- Legal status: AU: S4 (Prescription only); BR: Class B1 (Psychoactive drugs); CA: Schedule IV; DE: Prescription only (Anlage III for higher doses); UK: POM (Prescription only); US: Schedule IV; SE: Förteckning IV; Rx-only

Pharmacokinetic data
- Bioavailability: By mouth: 85%
- Metabolism: Liver glucuronidation
- Onset of action: IV: 1–5 minutes; IM: 15–30 minutes; PO: 20–30 minutes
- Elimination half-life: 10–20 hours
- Duration of action: IV/IM: 12–24 hours; PO: 6–8 hours
- Excretion: Kidney

Identifiers
- IUPAC name: (RS)-7-Chloro-5-(2-chlorophenyl)-3-hydroxy-1,3-dihydro-1,4-benzodiazepin-2-one
- CAS Number: 846-49-1
- PubChem CID: 3958
- DrugBank: DB00186
- ChemSpider: 3821
- UNII: O26FZP769L
- KEGG: D00365
- ChEBI: CHEBI:6539
- ChEMBL: ChEMBL580
- CompTox Dashboard (EPA): DTXSID7023225
- ECHA InfoCard: 100.011.534

Chemical and physical data
- Formula: C_{15}H_{10}Cl_{2}N_{2}O_{2}
- Molar mass: 321.16 g·mol^{−1}
- 3D model (JSmol): Interactive image
- SMILES: O=C1Nc2ccc(Cl)cc2C(c2ccccc2Cl)=NC1O
- InChI: InChI=1S/C15H10Cl2N2O2/c16-8-5-6-12-10(7-8)13(19-15(21)14(20)18-12)9-3-1-2-4-11(9)17/h1-7,15,21H,(H,18,20); Key:DIWRORZWFLOCLC-UHFFFAOYSA-N

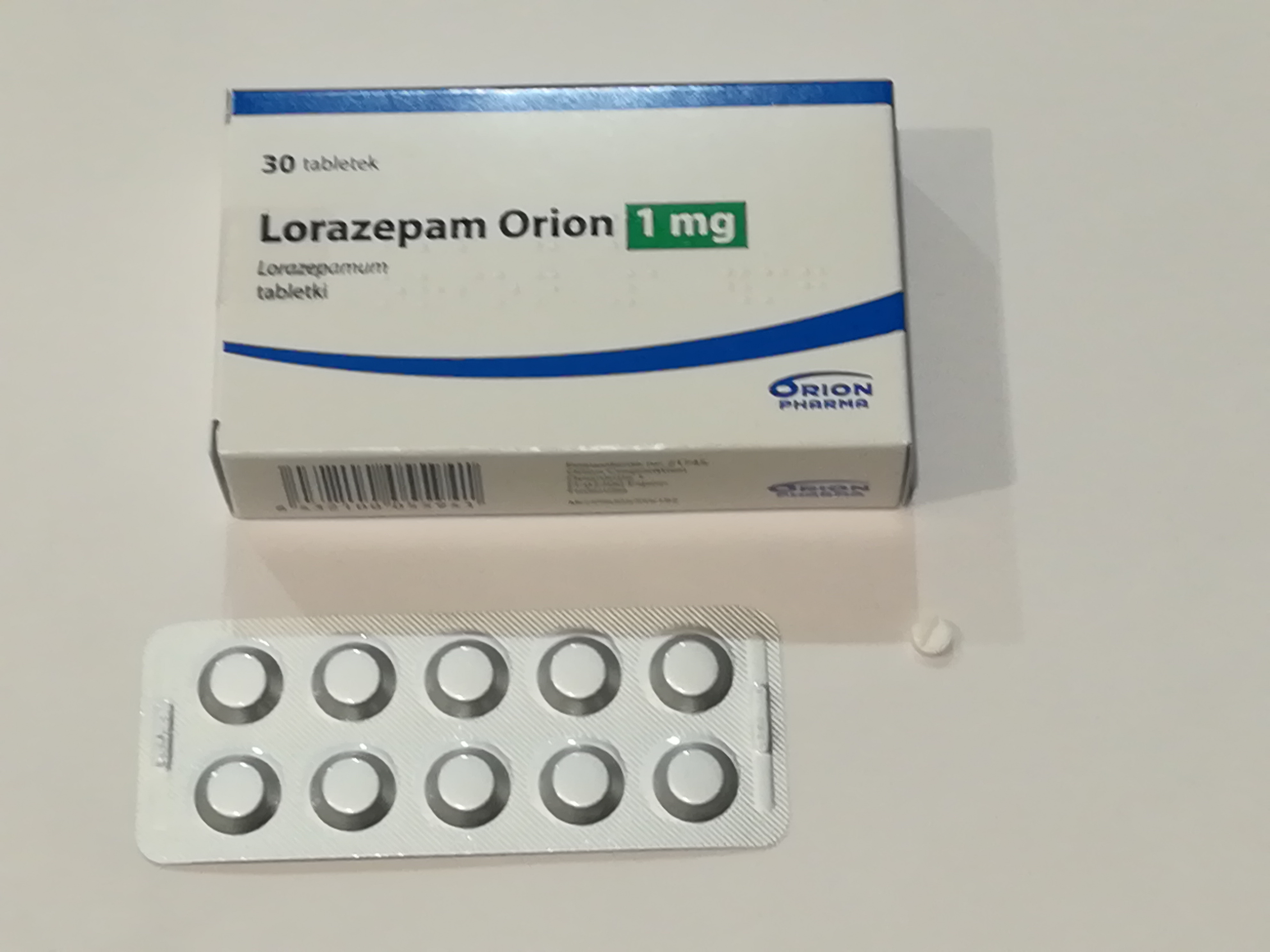
A box of Lorazepam Orion (lorazepam) tablets

Lorazepam, sold under the brand name Ativan among others, is a benzodiazepine medication that possesses anxiolytic, hypnotic, and anticonvulsant properties. It is indicated for the short term treatment of anxiety (including anxiety disorders), insomnia, severe agitation, active seizures including status epilepticus, alcohol withdrawal, and chemotherapy-induced nausea and vomiting. It is also used during surgery to interfere with memory formation, to sedate those who are being mechanically ventilated, and, along with other treatments, for acute coronary syndrome due to cocaine use. It can be given orally (by mouth), transdermally (on the skin via a topical gel or patch), intravenously (injection into a vein), or intramuscularly (injection into a muscle). When given by injection, onset of effects is between one and thirty minutes and effects last for up to a day.

Common side effects include weakness, sleepiness, dizziness, decreased alertness, decreased memory formation, low blood pressure, and a decreased effort to breathe. When given intravenously, the person is typically closely monitored. Among those who are depressed, there may be an increased risk of suicide. Drug tolerance may occur, especially after long-term use, where increasingly larger doses are required to achieve the same effect. Its use is highly liable to physical dependence and psychological dependence, and sudden stop after long-term use can cause symptoms of benzodiazepine withdrawal. Older people more often develop adverse effects. In this age group, lorazepam is associated with falls and hip fractures. Due to these concerns, lorazepam use is generally recommended for at most four weeks.

Lorazepam was initially patented in 1963 and went on sale in the United States in 1977. It is on the World Health Organization's List of Essential Medicines. It is available as a generic medication. In 2023, it was the 100th most commonly prescribed medication in the United States, with more than 6 million prescriptions.

== Medical uses ==
=== Anxiety ===
Lorazepam is used in the short-term management of severe anxiety. In the US, the Food and Drug Administration (FDA) advises against use of benzodiazepines such as lorazepam for longer than four weeks. It is fast-acting, and useful in treating fast-onset anxiety and panic attacks.

Lorazepam can effectively reduce agitation and induce sleep, and the duration of effects from a single dose makes it an appropriate choice for the short-term treatment of insomnia, especially in the presence of severe anxiety or night terrors. It has a fairly short duration of action.

Withdrawal symptoms, including rebound insomnia and rebound anxiety, may occur after seven days of use of lorazepam.

=== Seizures ===
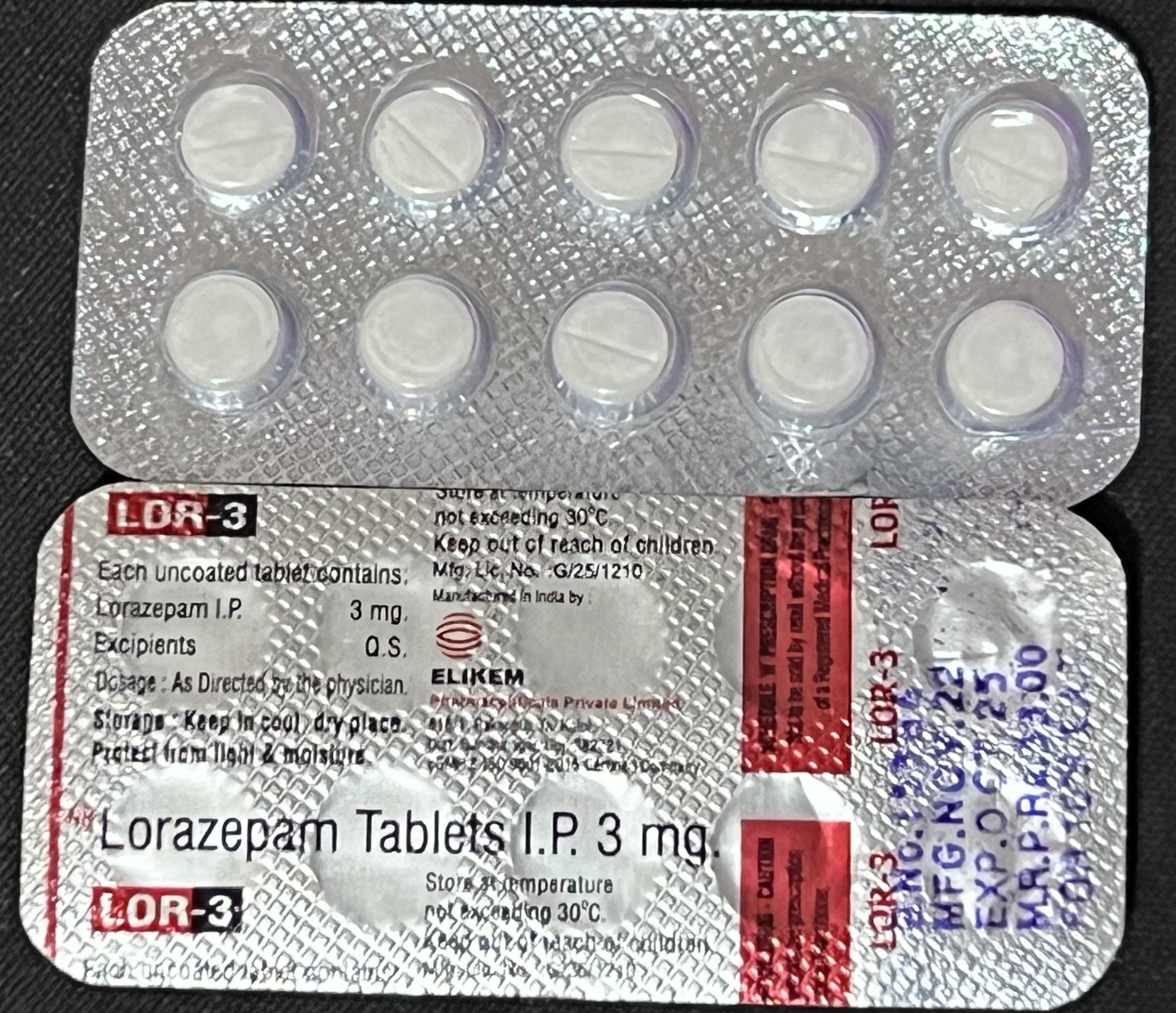
Lorazepam 3 mg scored tablets in a blister pack

Intravenous diazepam or lorazepam are first-line treatments for convulsive status epilepticus. Lorazepam is more effective than diazepam and intravenous phenytoin in the treatment of status epilepticus and has a lower risk of continuing seizures that might require additional medication.

Lorazepam's anticonvulsant properties and pharmacokinetic profile make intravenous use reliable for terminating acute seizures, but induce prolonged sedation. Orally administered benzodiazepines, including lorazepam, are occasionally used as long-term prophylactic treatment of resistant absence seizures; because of gradual tolerance to their anti-seizure effects, benzodiazepines are not considered first-line therapies. Additionally, common seizure characteristics (e.g., hypersalivation, jaw-clenching, involuntary swallowing) pose some difficulties with regard to oral administration.

Lorazepam's anticonvulsant and central nervous system depressant properties are useful for the treatment and prevention of alcohol withdrawal syndrome. In this setting, impaired liver function is not a hazard with lorazepam, since lorazepam does not require oxidation, in the liver or otherwise, for its metabolism. Lorazepam is noted as being the most tolerable benzodiazepine in those with advanced-stage liver disease.

=== Sedation ===
The relative effectiveness of lorazepam in preventing new memory formation, along with its ability to reduce agitation and anxiety, makes it useful as premedication. It is given before a general anesthetic to reduce the amount of anesthetic required or before unpleasant awake procedures, such as in dentistry or endoscopies, to reduce anxiety, increase compliance, and induce anterograde amnesia for the procedure. Orally administered lorazepam is given 90 to 120 minutes before procedures, and intravenous lorazepam is given up to 10 minutes before procedures. Lorazepam is sometimes used as an alternative to midazolam in palliative sedation. In intensive care units, lorazepam is sometimes used to produce anxiolysis, hypnosis, and amnesia.

Lorazepam is sometimes used for individuals receiving mechanical ventilation. In critically ill people, propofol has been found to be superior to lorazepam both in effectiveness and overall cost; as a result, the use of propofol for this indication is now encouraged, whereas the use of lorazepam is discouraged.

=== Agitation ===
Lorazepam is sometimes used as an alternative to haloperidol when there is the need for rapid sedation of violent or agitated individuals. Haloperidol plus promethazine is preferred due to better effectiveness and due to lorazepam's adverse effects on respiratory function. Adverse effects such as behavioral disinhibition may make benzodiazepines inappropriate for some people who are acutely psychotic. Acute delirium is sometimes treated with lorazepam, but as it can cause paradoxical effects, it is preferably given together with haloperidol. Lorazepam is absorbed relatively slowly if given intramuscularly, a common route in restraint situations.

=== Other ===
Catatonia with inability to speak is responsive to lorazepam. Symptoms may recur and treatment for some days may be necessary. Catatonia due to abrupt or overly rapid withdrawal from benzodiazepines, as part of the benzodiazepine withdrawal syndrome, also responds to lorazepam treatment. As lorazepam can have paradoxical effects, haloperidol is sometimes given at the same time.

It is sometimes used in chemotherapy in addition to antiemetics (i.e., nausea and vomiting caused or worsened by psychological sensitization to the thought of being sick). A transdermal product known as ABH gel containing lorazepam along with diphenhydramine and haloperidol is widely used in hospice and palliative care settings for the treatment of nausea and vomiting, though studies suggest absorption of the active ingredients is poor via this route, and evidence for efficacy is limited.

=== Available forms ===
Pure lorazepam is an almost white powder that is nearly insoluble in water and oil. In medicinal form, it is mainly available as tablets and a solution for injection, but, in some locations, it is also available as a skin patch, an oral solution, and a sublingual tablet.

Lorazepam injectable solution is administered either by deep intramuscular injection or by intravenous injection. The injectable solution comes in 1 mL ampoules containing 2 or 4 mg of lorazepam. The solvents used are polyethylene glycol 400 and propylene glycol. As a preservative, the injectable solution contains benzyl alcohol. Toxicity from propylene glycol has been reported in the case of a person receiving a continuous lorazepam infusion.

Topical formulations of lorazepam, while sometimes used as a treatment for nausea, especially in people in hospice, has been advised against by the American Academy of Hospice and Palliative Medicine for this purpose as it has not been proven effective.

== Contraindications ==
Various medical conditions and stages of life can cause problems with lorazepam.

- Past hypersensitivity or allergy to lorazepam, its ingredients in tablets or injections or any other benzodiazepine.
- Ataxia, a neurological clinical sign, consisting of unsteady and clumsy motion of the limbs and torso, due to the failure of gross muscle movement coordination, most evident on standing and walking. It is the classic way in which acute alcohol intoxication may affect a person. Benzodiazepines are not recommended to be administered to people who are already ataxic.
- Lorazepam has pupil-dilating effects, which may further interfere with the drainage of aqueous humor from the anterior chamber of the eye, thus worsening narrow-angle glaucoma.
- Sleep apnea may be worsened by lorazepam's central nervous system depressant effects. It may further reduce the person's ability to protect their airway during sleep.
- Myasthenia gravis, which is characterized by muscle weakness, may have exacerbated symptoms with muscle relaxants such as lorazepam.
- Lorazepam belongs to the Food and Drug Administration (FDA) pregnancy category D, which means it is likely to cause harm to the developing baby if taken during the first trimester of pregnancy. The evidence is inconclusive as to whether lorazepam if taken early in pregnancy results in reduced intelligence, neurodevelopmental problems, physical malformations in cardiac or facial structure, or other malformations in some newborns. Lorazepam given to pregnant women antenatally may cause floppy infant syndrome in the neonate, or respiratory depression necessitating ventilation. Regular lorazepam use during late pregnancy (the third trimester), carries a definite risk of benzodiazepine withdrawal syndrome in the neonate. Neonatal benzodiazepine withdrawal may include hypotonia, reluctance to suck, apneic spells, cyanosis, and impaired metabolic responses to cold stress. Symptoms of floppy infant syndrome and neonatal benzodiazepine withdrawal syndrome have been reported to persist from hours to months after birth. Lorazepam may also inhibit fetal liver bilirubin glucuronidation, leading to neonatal jaundice. Lorazepam is present in breast milk, so caution is exercised about lorazepam usage for breastfeeding patients.

== Adverse effects ==
Many beneficial effects of lorazepam (e.g., sedative, muscle relaxant, anti-anxiety, and amnesic effects) may become adverse effects when unwanted. Adverse effects can include sedation and low blood pressure; the effects of lorazepam are increased in combination with other CNS depressants. Other adverse effects include confusion, ataxia, inhibiting the formation of new memories, pupil constriction, and hangover effects. With long-term benzodiazepine use, it is unclear whether cognitive impairments fully return to normal after stopping lorazepam use; cognitive deficits persist for at least six months after withdrawal, but longer than six months may be required for recovery of cognitive function. Lorazepam appears to have more profound adverse effects on memory than other benzodiazepines; it impairs both explicit and implicit memory. In the elderly, falls may occur as a result of benzodiazepines. Adverse effects are more common in the elderly, and they appear at lower doses than in younger people. Benzodiazepines can cause or worsen depression. Paradoxical effects can also occur, such as worsening of seizures, or paradoxical excitement; paradoxical excitement is more likely to occur in the elderly, children, those with a history of alcohol abuse, and in people with a history of aggression or anger problems. Lorazepam's effects are dose-dependent, meaning the higher the dose, the stronger the effects (and side effects) will be. Using the smallest dose needed to achieve desired effects lessens the risk of adverse effects. Sedative drugs and sleeping pills, including lorazepam, have been associated with an increased risk of death.

Sedation is the side effect people taking lorazepam most frequently report. In a group of around 3,500 people treated for anxiety, the most common side effects complained of from lorazepam were sedation (15.9%), dizziness (6.9%), weakness (4.2%), and unsteadiness (3.4%). Side effects such as sedation and unsteadiness increased with age. Cognitive impairment, behavioral disinhibition and respiratory depression as well as hypotension may also occur.

- Paradoxical effects: In some cases, paradoxical effects can occur with benzodiazepines, such as increased hostility, aggression, angry outbursts, and psychomotor agitation. These effects are seen more commonly with lorazepam than with other benzodiazepines. Paradoxical effects are more likely to occur with higher doses, in people with pre-existing personality disorders and those with a psychiatric illness. Frustrating stimuli may trigger such reactions, though the drug may have been prescribed to help the person cope with such stress and frustration in the first place. As paradoxical effects appear to be dose-related, they usually subside on dose reduction or on complete withdrawal of lorazepam.
- Suicidality: Benzodiazepines are associated with an increased risk of suicide, possibly due to disinhibition. Higher dosages appear to confer greater risk.
- Amnesic effects: Among benzodiazepines, lorazepam has relatively strong amnesic effects, but people soon develop tolerance to this with regular use. An initial total daily lorazepam dose that does not exceed 2 mg may help avoid amnesia (or excess sedation) being a problem. This also applies to use for night sedation. Five participants in a sleep study were prescribed lorazepam 4 mg at night, and the next evening, three subjects unexpectedly volunteered memory gaps for parts of that day, an effect that subsided completely after two to three days' use. Amnesic effects cannot be estimated from the degree of sedation present, since the two effects are unrelated.
- High-dose or prolonged parenterally-administered lorazepam with its associated solvent can cause propylene glycol intoxication and poisoning.

In September 2020, the US Food and Drug Administration (FDA) required the boxed warning be updated for all benzodiazepine medicines to describe the risks of abuse, misuse, addiction, physical dependence, and withdrawal reactions consistently across all the medicines in the class.

=== Specific groups ===
- Children and the elderly – The safety and effectiveness of lorazepam are not well determined in children under 18 years of age, but it is used to treat acute seizures. Dose requirements have to be individualized, especially in people who are elderly and debilitated in whom the risk of oversedation is greater. Long-term therapy may lead to cognitive deficits, especially in the elderly, which may only be partially reversible. The elderly metabolize benzodiazepines more slowly than younger people and are more sensitive to the adverse effects of benzodiazepines compared to younger individuals even at similar plasma levels. Additionally, the elderly tend to take more drugs which may interact with or enhance the effects of benzodiazepines. Benzodiazepines, including lorazepam, have been found to increase the risk of falls and fractures in the elderly. As a result, dosage recommendations for the elderly are about half of those used in younger individuals and used for no longer than two weeks. Lorazepam may also be slower to clear in the elderly, leading potentially to accumulation and enhanced effects. Lorazepam, similar to other benzodiazepines and nonbenzodiazepines, causes impairments in body balance and standing steadiness in individuals who wake up at night or the next morning. Falls and hip fractures are frequently reported. The combination with alcohol increases these impairments. Partial, but incomplete, tolerance develops to these impairments.
- Liver or kidney failure – Lorazepam may be safer than most benzodiazepines in people with impaired liver function. Like oxazepam, it does not require liver oxidation, but only liver glucuronidation into lorazepam-glucuronide. Therefore, impaired liver function is unlikely to result in lorazepam accumulation to an extent causing adverse reactions. Similarly kidney disease has minimal effects on lorazepam levels.
- Drug and alcohol dependence – The risk of abuse of lorazepam is increased in dependent people.
- Comorbid psychiatric disorders also increase the risk of dependence and paradoxical adverse effects.

=== Tolerance and dependence ===
Dependence typified by a withdrawal syndrome occurs in about one-third of individuals who are treated for longer than four weeks with a benzodiazepine. Higher doses and longer periods of use increase the risk of developing a benzodiazepine dependence. Potent benzodiazepines with a relatively short half-life, such as lorazepam, alprazolam, and triazolam, have the highest risk of causing dependence.

If regular treatment is continued for longer than four to six months, dose increases may be necessary to maintain effects, but treatment-resistant symptoms may be benzodiazepine withdrawal symptoms. Due to the development of tolerance to the anticonvulsant effects, benzodiazepines are generally not recommended for long-term use for the management of epilepsy. Increasing the dose may overcome tolerance, but tolerance may then develop to the higher dose and adverse effects may persist and worsen. The mechanism of tolerance to benzodiazepines is complex and involves GABA_{A} receptor downregulation, alterations to subunit configuration of GABA_{A} receptors, uncoupling, and internalization of the benzodiazepine binding site from the GABA_{A} receptor complex as well as changes in gene expression.

Coming off long-term lorazepam use may be more realistically achieved by a gradual switch to an equivalent dose of diazepam and a period of stabilization on this, and only then initiating dose reductions. The advantage of switching to diazepam is that dose reductions are felt less acutely, because of the longer half-lives (20–200 hours) of diazepam and its active metabolites.

=== Withdrawal ===
On abrupt or overly rapid discontinuation of lorazepam, anxiety, and signs of physical withdrawal have been observed, similar to those seen on withdrawal from alcohol and barbiturates. Lorazepam, as with other benzodiazepine drugs, can cause physical dependence, addiction, and benzodiazepine withdrawal syndrome. The higher the dose and the longer the drug is taken, the greater the risk of experiencing unpleasant withdrawal symptoms. Withdrawal symptoms can also occur from standard dosages and after short-term use. Benzodiazepine treatment is recommended to be discontinued as soon as possible via a slow and gradual dose reduction regimen. Rebound effects often resemble the condition being treated, but typically at a more intense level and may be difficult to diagnose. Withdrawal symptoms can range from mild anxiety and insomnia to more severe symptoms such as seizures and psychosis. The risk and severity of withdrawal are increased with long-term use, use of high doses, abrupt or over-rapid reduction, among other factors. Short-acting benzodiazepines, such as lorazepam, are more likely to cause a more severe withdrawal syndrome compared to longer-acting benzodiazepines.

Withdrawal symptoms can occur after taking therapeutic doses of lorazepam for as little as one week. Withdrawal symptoms include headaches, anxiety, tension, depression, insomnia, restlessness, confusion, irritability, sweating, dysphoria, dizziness, derealization, depersonalization, numbness/tingling of extremities, hypersensitivity to light, sound, and smell, perceptual distortions, nausea, vomiting, diarrhea, appetite loss, hallucinations, delirium, seizures, tremor, stomach cramps, myalgia, agitation, palpitations, tachycardia, panic attacks, short-term memory loss, and hyperthermia. It takes about 18–36 hours for lorazepam to be removed from the body.

== Overdose ==
Signs of overdose range through mental confusion, dysarthria, paradoxical reactions, drowsiness, hypotonia, ataxia, hypotension, hypnotic state, coma, cardiovascular depression, respiratory depression, and death. Fatal overdoses on benzodiazepines alone are rare and less common than with barbiturates.

Early management of people under alert includes emetics, gastric lavage, and activated charcoal. Otherwise, management is by observation, including vital signs, support and, if necessary, giving intravenous flumazenil.

=== Detection in body fluids ===
Lorazepam may be quantitated in blood or plasma to confirm poisoning in hospitalized people, provide evidence of an impaired driving arrest or to assist in a medicolegal death investigation. Blood or plasma concentrations are usually in a range of 10–300 μg/L in persons either receiving the drug therapeutically or in those arrested for impaired driving. Approximately 300–1000 μg/L is found in people after acute overdosage. Lorazepam may not be detected by commonly used urine drug screenings for benzodiazepines. This is due to the fact that the majority of these screening tests are only able to detect benzodiazepines that undergo oxazepam glucuronide metabolism.

== Interactions ==
Lorazepam is not usually fatal in overdose but may cause respiratory depression if taken in overdose with alcohol. The combination also causes greater enhancement of the disinhibitory and amnesic effects of both drugs, with potentially embarrassing or criminal consequences. Some experts advise that people should be warned against drinking alcohol while on lorazepam treatment, but such clear warnings are not universal.

Greater adverse effects may also occur when lorazepam is used with other drugs, such as opioids or other hypnotics. Lorazepam may also interact with rifabutin. Valproate inhibits the metabolism of lorazepam, whereas carbamazepine, lamotrigine, phenobarbital, phenytoin, and rifampin increase its rate of metabolism. Some antidepressants, anticonvulsants drugs such as phenobarbital, phenytoin, and carbamazepine, sedative antihistamines, opioids, antipsychotics, and alcohol, when taken with lorazepam, may result in enhanced sedative effects.

== Pharmacology ==
Lorazepam has anxiolytic, sedative, hypnotic, amnesic, anticonvulsant, and muscle relaxant properties. It is a high-potency and an intermediate-acting (10–20 hour half-life) benzodiazepine, and its uniqueness, advantages, and disadvantages are largely explained by its pharmacokinetic properties (poor water and lipid solubility, high protein binding and anoxidative metabolism to a pharmacologically inactive glucuronide form) and by its high relative potency (lorazepam 1 mg is equal in effect to diazepam 10 mg). The biological half-life of lorazepam is 10–20 hours.

=== Pharmacokinetics ===
Lorazepam is highly protein-bound and is extensively metabolized into pharmacologically inactive metabolites. Due to its poor lipid solubility, lorazepam is absorbed relatively slowly by mouth and is unsuitable for rectal administration. However, its poor lipid solubility and a high degree of protein binding (85–90%) mean that its volume of distribution is mainly the vascular compartment, causing relatively prolonged peak effects. This contrasts with the highly lipid-soluble diazepam, which, although rapidly absorbed orally or rectally, soon redistributes from the serum to other parts of the body, in particular, body fat. This explains why one lorazepam dose, despite its shorter serum half-life, has more prolonged peak effects than an equivalent diazepam dose. Lorazepam is rapidly conjugated at its 3-hydroxy group into lorazepam glucuronide which is then excreted in the urine. Lorazepam glucuronide has no demonstrable CNS activity in animals. The plasma levels of lorazepam are proportional to the dose given. There is no evidence of accumulation of lorazepam on administration up to six months. On regular administration, diazepam will accumulate, since it has a longer half-life and active metabolites, these metabolites also have long half-lives.

Clinical example: Diazepam has long been a drug of choice for status epilepticus; its high lipid solubility means it gets absorbed with equal speed whether given orally, or rectally (nonintravenous routes are convenient outside of hospital settings), but diazepam's high lipid solubility also means it does not remain in the vascular space, but soon redistributes into other body tissues. So, it may be necessary to repeat diazepam doses to maintain peak anticonvulsant effects, resulting in excess body accumulation. Lorazepam is a different case; its low lipid solubility makes it relatively slowly absorbed by any route other than intravenously, but once injected, it will not get significantly redistributed beyond the vascular space. Therefore, lorazepam's anticonvulsant effects are more durable, thus reducing the need for repeated doses. If a person is known to usually stop convulsing after only one or two diazepam doses, it may be preferable because sedative after effects will be less than if a single dose of lorazepam is given (diazepam anticonvulsant/sedative effects wear off after 15–30 minutes, but lorazepam effects last 12–24 hours). The prolonged sedation from lorazepam may, however, be an acceptable trade-off for its reliable duration of effects, particularly if the person needs to be transferred to another facility. Although lorazepam is not necessarily better than diazepam at initially terminating seizures, lorazepam is, nevertheless, replacing diazepam as the intravenous agent of choice in status epilepticus.

Lorazepam serum levels are proportional to the dose administered. Giving 2 mg oral lorazepam will result in a peak total serum level of around 20 ng/mL around two hours later, half of which is lorazepam, half its inactive metabolite, lorazepam-glucuronide. A similar lorazepam dose given intravenously will result in an earlier and higher peak serum level, with a higher relative proportion of unmetabolised (active) lorazepam. On regular administration, maximum serum levels are attained after three days. Longer-term use, up to six months, does not result in further accumulation. On discontinuation, lorazepam serum levels become negligible after three days and undetectable after about a week. Lorazepam is metabolized in the liver by conjugation into inactive lorazepam-glucuronide. This metabolism does not involve liver oxidation, so is relatively unaffected by reduced liver function. Lorazepam-glucuronide is more water-soluble than its precursor, so gets more widely distributed in the body, leading to a longer half-life than lorazepam. Lorazepam-glucuronide is eventually excreted by the kidneys, and, because of its tissue accumulation, it remains detectable, particularly in the urine, for substantially longer than lorazepam.

=== Pharmacodynamics ===
Relative to other benzodiazepines, lorazepam is thought to have a high affinity for GABA receptors, which may also explain its marked amnesic effects. Its main pharmacological effects are the enhancement of the effects of the neurotransmitter GABA at the GABA_{A} receptor. Benzodiazepines, such as lorazepam, enhance the effects of GABA at the GABA_{A} receptor via increasing the frequency of opening of the chloride ion channel on the GABA_{A} receptors; which results in the therapeutic actions of benzodiazepines. They, however, do not on their own activate the GABA_{A} receptors but require the neurotransmitter GABA to be present. Thus, the effect of benzodiazepines is to enhance the effects of the neurotransmitter GABA.

The magnitude and duration of lorazepam effects are dose-related, meaning larger doses have stronger and longer-lasting effects, because the brain has spare benzodiazepine drug receptor capacity, with single, clinical doses leading only to an occupancy of some 3% of the available receptors.

The anticonvulsant properties of lorazepam and other benzodiazepines may be, in part or entirely, due to binding to voltage-dependent sodium channels rather than benzodiazepine receptors. Sustained repetitive firing seems to be limited by the benzodiazepine effect of slowing recovery of sodium channels from inactivation to deactivation in mouse spinal cord cell cultures, hence prolonging the refractory period.

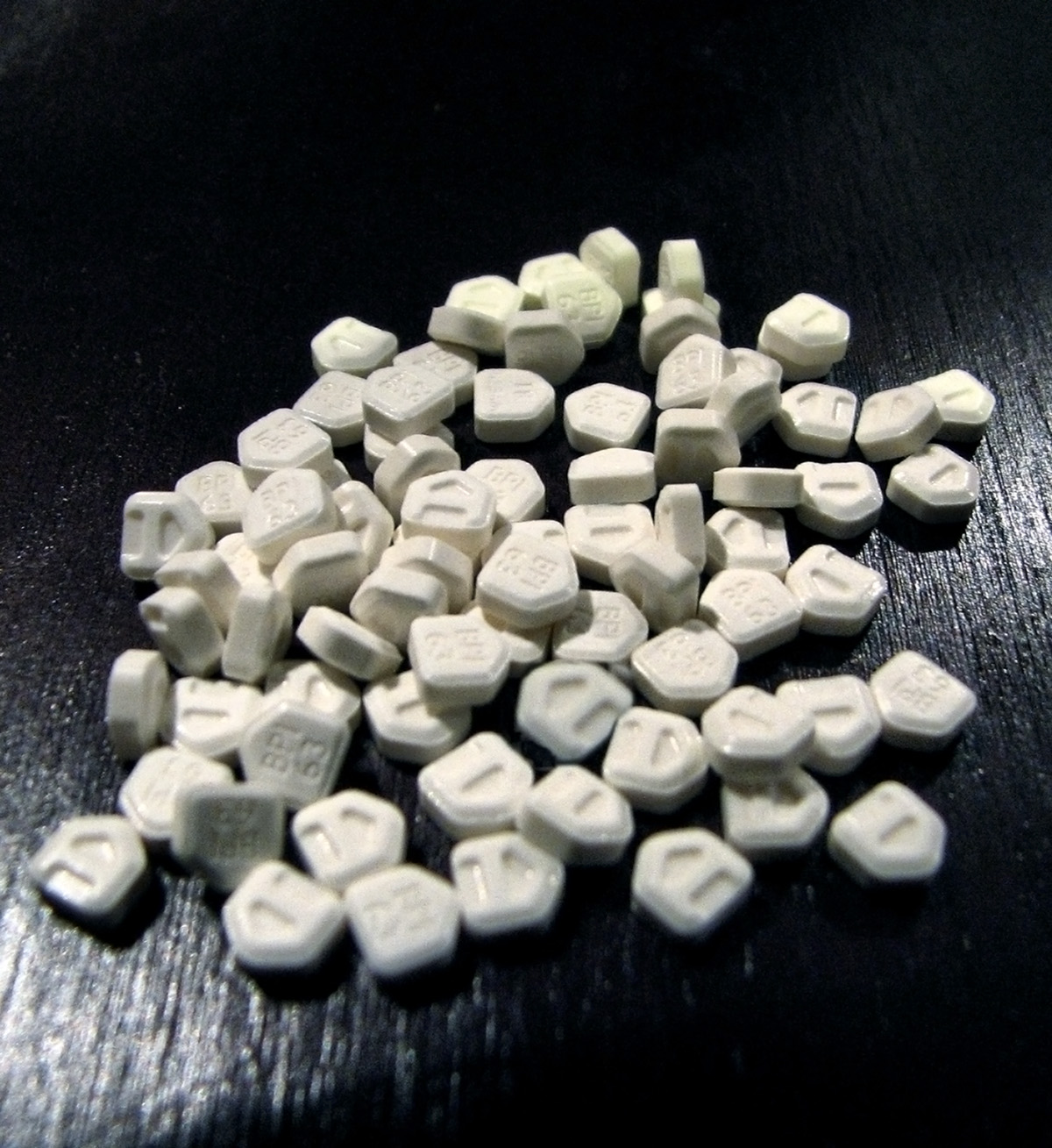
0.5 mg tablets of the Ativan brand of lorazepam

== History ==
1987 advertisement. "In a world where certainties are few...no wonder Ativan is prescribed by so many caring clinicians."

Historically, lorazepam is one of the "classical" benzodiazepines. Others include diazepam, clonazepam, oxazepam, nitrazepam, flurazepam, bromazepam, and clorazepate. Lorazepam was introduced by Wyeth Pharmaceuticals in 1977 under the brand names Ativan and Temesta. The drug was developed by D.J. Richards, president of research. Wyeth's original patent on lorazepam is expired in the United States.

== Society and culture ==
=== Recreational use ===
Lorazepam is also used for other purposes, such as recreational drug use, wherein it is taken to achieve a high, or when the medication is continued long-term against medical advice.

A 2006 large-scale, nationwide, US government study of pharmaceutical-related emergency department visits by SAMHSA found sedative-hypnotics are the pharmaceuticals most frequently used outside of their prescribed medical purpose in the United States, with 35% of drug-related emergency department visits involving sedative-hypnotics. In this category, benzodiazepines are most commonly used. Males and females use benzodiazepines for nonmedical purposes equally. Of drugs used in attempted suicide, benzodiazepines are the most commonly used pharmaceutical drugs, with 25% of attempted suicides involving them and lorazepam specifically being used in 3.6% of attempts. Lorazepam was the third-most-common benzodiazepine used outside of prescription in these ER visit statistics.

=== Legal status ===
Lorazepam is a Schedule IV drug under the Controlled Substances Act in the US and internationally under the United Nations Convention on Psychotropic Substances. It is a Schedule IV drug under the Controlled Drugs and Substances Act in Canada. In the United Kingdom, it is a Class C, Schedule 4 Controlled Drug under the Misuse of Drugs Regulations 2001.
