= Paradoxical disinhibition =

Unexpected reaction to benzodiazepines

Paradoxical disinhibition is a paradoxical reaction, an uncommon but recognized phenomenon, characterized by acute excitement and an altered mental state, caused by benzodiazepines. The mechanism is poorly known, but the most accepted theory is that it occurs secondary to inhibition of the restraining influences of the cortex and frontal lobe due to the GABA-mimetic action of benzodiazepines. Reversal of this action could be attained by an NMDA-receptor antagonist, ketamine.

== Mechanism ==
It is thought that blockage of presynasptic GABA receptors of GABAergic neurons induce stimulation as a net effect, because the action of the most powerful inhibitory neurotransmitter, GABA, is blocked.
