= Eagle effect =

Reduced antibiotic effect at higher concentrations

The Eagle effect, Eagle phenomenon, or paradoxical zone phenomenon, named after Harry Eagle who first described it, originally referred to the paradoxically reduced antibacterial effect of penicillin at high doses, though recent usage generally refers to the relative lack of efficacy of beta lactam antibacterial drugs on infections having large numbers of bacteria. The former effect is paradoxical because the effectiveness of an antibiotic generally rises with increasing drug concentration.

== Mechanism ==
Proposed mechanisms:

- Reduced expression of penicillin binding proteins during stationary growth phase
- Induction of microbial resistance mechanisms (such as beta lactamases with short half-lives) by high drug concentrations
- Precipitation of antimicrobial drug in vitro, possibly also leading to the crystallized drug being mis-detected as colonies of the microbe.
- Self-antagonising the receptor with which it binds (penicillin binding proteins, for example, in the case of a penicillin).

Penicillin is a bactericidal antibiotic that works by inhibiting cell wall synthesis but this synthesis only occurs when bacteria are actively replicating (or in the log phase of growth). In cases of extremely high bacterial burden (such as with Group A Strep), bacteria may be in the stationary phase of growth. In this instance since no bacteria are actively replicating (presumably due to nutrient restriction) penicillin has no activity. This is why adding an antibiotic like clindamycin, which acts ribosomally, kills some of the bacteria and returns them to the log phase of growth.
