= 2-Amino-5-chlorobenzophenone =

Chemical compound, benzodiazepine precursor

Names
- Preferred IUPAC name (2-Amino-5-chlorophenyl)(phenyl)methanone
- Other names: 2-amino-5-chlorobenzophenone; 2-Benzoyl-4-chloroaniline

Identifiers
CAS Number	719-59-5
3D model (JSmol)	Interactive image
ChEMBL	ChEMBL1417425
ChemSpider	12339
ECHA InfoCard	100.010.864
EC Number	211-949-7
PubChem CID	12870
UNII	FR80014ZBT
CompTox Dashboard (EPA)	DTXSID0052463
- InChI: InChI=1S/C13H10ClNO/c14-10-6-7-12(15)11(8-10)13(16)9-4-2-1-3-5-9/h1-8H,15H2 Key: ZUWXHHBROGLWNH-UHFFFAOYSA-N
- SMILES: C1=CC=C(C=C1)C(=O)C2=C(C=CC(=C2)Cl)N

Properties
Chemical formula	C_{13}H_{10}ClNO
Molar mass	231.68 g·mol^{−1}

Hazards
- GHS labelling
Pictograms	(GHS07: Exclamation mark)
Signal word	Warning
Hazard statements	H315, H319, H335
Precautionary statements	P261, P264, P264+P265, P271, P280, P302+P352, P304+P340, P305+P351+P338, P319, P321, P332+P317, P337+P317, P362+P364, P403+P233, P405, P501
- Except where otherwise noted, data are given for materials in their standard state (at 25 °C [77 °F], 100 kPa). Infobox references

2-Amino-5-chlorobenzophenone is a substituted benzophenone that can be used in the synthesis of benzodiazepines.

== Chemistry ==
2-Amino-5-chlorobenzophenone is a substituted derivative of benzophenone, where the hydrogen atom at the 2 position has been replaced by an amino group (–NH_{2}) and the one at the 5 position replaced with a chlorine atom.

=== Synthesis ===
Synthesis of 2-amino-5-chlorobenzophenone in two steps from 4-nitrochlorobenzene.

2-Amino-5-chlorobenzophenone can be synthesized in two steps from 4-nitrochlorobenzene. In the first step 4-nitrochlorobenzene is condensed with phenylacetonitrile in alkaline methanol. This proceeds with the loss of cyanide and water to produce 5-chloro-3-phenylanthranil. In a subsequent step the isoxazole ring undergoes reductive cleavage to furnish the benzophenone. This reduction can be conducted with iron in hydrochloric acid or by catalytic hydrogenation in the presence of palladium.

== Synthesis of benzodiazepines ==
2-Amino-5-chlorobenzophenone and its derivatives can be used to produce benzodiazepines, a few examples are listed below;

=== Prazepam ===
Prazepam can be produced by the acylation of 2-amino-5-chlorobenzophenone with cyclo-propanecarbonyl chloride and triethylamine, 2-cyclopropylmethylamino-5-chlorobenzhydrol is then obtained by using lithium aluminium hydride as a reducing agent, this product is then oxidized by using manganese dioxide. The resulting compound goes another acylation reaction using phthalimidoacetyl chloride and finally treated with hydrazine hydrate to produce prazepam.

=== Lorazepam ===
Lorazepam can be made using 2-amino-2′,5-dichlorobenzophenone (a derivative of 2-amino-5-chlorobenzophenone), which is first reacted with hydroxylamine, the obtained product is then reacted with chloroacetyl chloride to give 6-chloro-2-chlormethyl-4-(2′-chlorophenyl)quinazolin-3-oxide, a reaction with methylamine produces ring expansion and rearrangement, which forms 7-chloro-2-methylamino-5-(2′-chlorphenyl)-3H-1,4-benzodiazepin-4-oxide, acetylation with acetic anhydride gives a product which goes under hydrolysis by reacting it with hydrochloric acid, this gives 7-chloro-5-(2′-chlorophenyl)-1,2-dihydro-3H-1,4-benzodiazepin-2-on-4-oxide, a second reaction with acetic anhydride gives 7-chloro-1,3-dihydro-3-acetoxy-5-(2′-chlorphenyl)-2H-benzodiazepin-2-one, the last step involves hydrolysis of this product under sodium hydroxide to give lorazepam.

=== Chlordiazepoxide ===
To make chlordiazepoxide, 2-amino-5-chlorobenzophenone is first reacted with hydroxylamine, the resulting product is then reacted with chloracetyl chloride in acetic acid, resulting in 6-chloro-2-chloromethyl-4-phenylquinazolin-3-oxide, reaction with methylamine gives chlordiazepoxide.
