= Prazepam =

Benzodiazepine drug

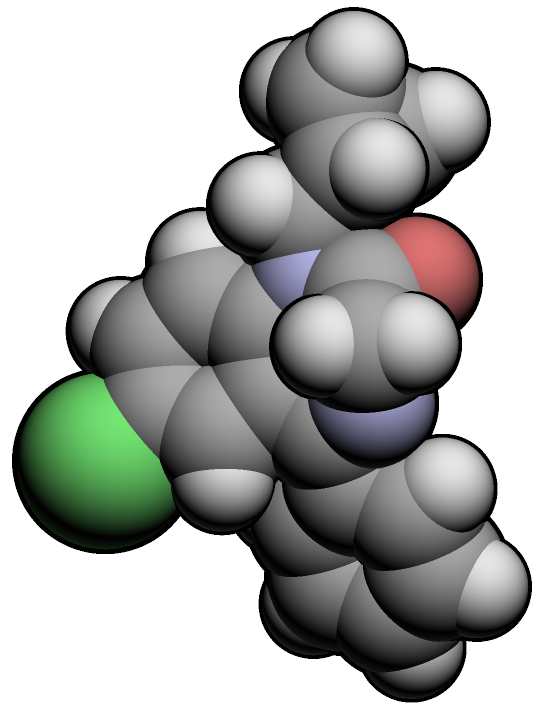

Clinical data
- Other names: 9-chloro-2-(cyclopropylmethyl)-6-phenyl-2,5-diazabicyclo[5.4.0]undeca-5,8,10,12-tetraen- 3-one
- AHFS/Drugs.com: Micromedex Detailed Consumer Information
- MedlinePlus: a601036
- Routes of administration: Oral
- ATC code: N05BA11 (WHO)

Legal status
- Legal status: BR: Class B1 (Psychoactive drugs); CA: Schedule IV; DE: Prescription only (Anlage III for higher doses); US: Schedule IV

Pharmacokinetic data
- Metabolism: Hepatic
- Elimination half-life: 36–200 hours
- Excretion: Renal

Identifiers
- IUPAC name: 7-Chloro-1-(cyclopropylmethyl)-5-phenyl-1,3-dihydro-2H-1,4-benzodiazepin-2-one
- CAS Number: 2955-38-6
- PubChem CID: 4890
- IUPHAR/BPS: 7275
- DrugBank: DB01588
- ChemSpider: 4721
- UNII: Q30VCC064M
- KEGG: D00470
- ChEMBL: ChEMBL969
- CompTox Dashboard (EPA): DTXSID4021181
- ECHA InfoCard: 100.019.069

Chemical and physical data
- Formula: C_{19}H_{17}ClN_{2}O
- Molar mass: 324.81 g·mol^{−1}
- 3D model (JSmol): Interactive image
- SMILES: Clc4cc\1c(N(C(=O)C/N=C/1c2ccccc2)CC3CC3)cc4
- InChI: InChI=1S/C19H17ClN2O/c20-15-8-9-17-16(10-15)19(14-4-2-1-3-5-14)21-11-18(23)22(17)12-13-6-7-13/h1-5,8-10,13H,6-7,11-12H2; Key:MWQCHHACWWAQLJ-UHFFFAOYSA-N

Prazepam is a benzodiazepine derivative drug developed by Warner-Lambert in the 1960s. It possesses anxiolytic, anticonvulsant, sedative and skeletal muscle relaxant properties. Prazepam, (Elimination half-life 29-224h), is a prodrug for desmethyldiazepam, (Elimination half-life 36-200h), which is responsible for the therapeutic effects of prazepam.

== Indications ==
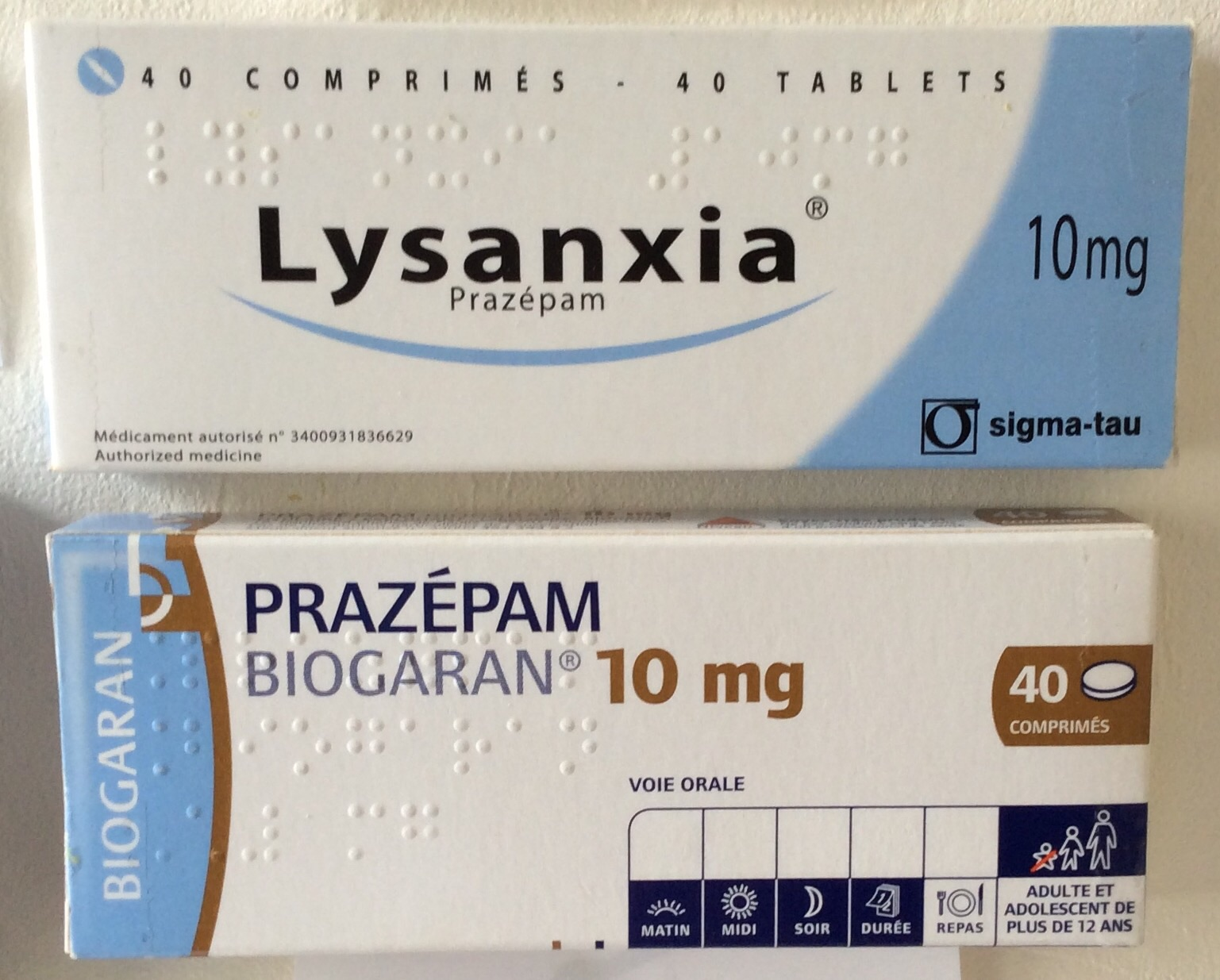
Prazepam 10mg manufactured by two different companies in France

Prazepam is indicated for the short-term treatment of anxiety. After short-term therapy, the dose is usually gradually tapered-off to reduce or avoid any withdrawal or rebound effects. Desmethyldiazepam, an active metabolite, has a very long half-life of 36 to 200 hours, which contributes to the therapeutic effects of prazepam.

== Side effects ==
Side effects of prazepam are less profound than with other benzodiazepines. Excessive drowsiness and with longer-term use, drug dependence, are the most common side effects of prazepam. Side effects such as fatigue or "feeling spacey" can also occur but less commonly than with other benzodiazepines. Other side effects include feebleness, clumsiness or lethargy, clouded thinking and mental slowness.

== Tolerance, dependence and withdrawal ==
Tolerance and dependence can develop with long-term use of prazepam, and upon cessation or reduction in dosage, then a benzodiazepine withdrawal syndrome may occur with symptoms such as tremulousness, dysphoria, psychomotor agitation, tachycardia and sweating. In severe cases, hallucinations, psychosis and seizures can occur. Withdrawal-related psychosis is generally unresponsive to antipsychotic mediations. The risk and severity of the withdrawal syndrome increases the higher the dose and the longer prazepam is taken for. Tolerance, dependence and withdrawal problems may be less severe than with other benzodiazepines, such as diazepam. It may be because tolerance is slower to develop with prazepam than with other benzodiazepines. Abrupt or over-rapid discontinuation of prazepam after long-term use, even at low dosage, may result in a protracted withdrawal syndrome.

Benzodiazepines can induce serious problems of addiction, which is one of the main reasons for their use being restricted to short-term use. A survey in Senegal found that the majority of doctors believed that their training in this area was generally poor. It was recommended that national authorities take urgent action regarding the rational use of benzodiazepines. Almost one-fifth of doctors ignored prescription guidelines regarding short-term use of benzodiazepines, and almost three-quarters of doctors regarded their training and knowledge of benzodiazepines to be inadequate. More training regarding benzodiazepines has been recommended for doctors.

== Contraindications and special caution ==
Benzodiazepines require special precaution if used in the elderly, during pregnancy, in children, alcohol or drug-dependent individuals and individuals with comorbid psychiatric disorders.

== Mechanism of action ==
Prazepam exerts its therapeutic effects primarily via modulating the benzodiazepine site which in turn enhances GABA function in the brain. Prazepam like other benzodiazepines has anticonvulsant properties, but its anticonvulsant properties are not as potent as other benzodiazepines when tested in animal studies.

== Pharmacokinetics ==
Prazepam is metabolised into descyclopropylmethylprazepam (also known as desmethyldiazepam) and 3-hydroxyprazepam which is further metabolised into oxazepam. Prazepam is a prodrug for descyclopropylmethylprazepam/desmethyldiazepam (also known as norprazepam or nordazepam) which is responsible for most of the therapeutic activity of prazepam rather than prazepam itself.

== Interactions ==
Prazepam may interact with cimetidine. Alcohol in combination with prazepam increases the adverse effects, particularly performance impairing side effects and drowsiness.

== Overdose ==
The symptoms of an overdose of prazepam include sleepiness, agitation and ataxia. Hypotonia may also occur in severe cases. Overdoses in children typically result in more severe symptoms of overdose.

== Abuse potential ==
Prazepam like other benzodiazepines has abuse potential and can be habit forming. However, its abuse potential may be lower than other benzodiazepines because it has a slow onset of action.

== Toxicity ==
Animal studies have found prazepam taken during pregnancy results in delayed growth and causes reproductive abnormalities.

== Trade names ==
Common trade names include Centrac, Centrax, Demetrin, Lysanxia, Mono Demetrin, Pozapam, Prasepine, Prazene, Reapam and Trepidan. Trade names vary depending on the country; Austria: Demetrin, Belgium: Lysanxia, France: Lysanxia, Germany: Demetrin; Mono Demetrin, Greece: Centrac, Ireland: Centrax, Italy: Prazene; Trepidan, Macedonia: Demetrin, Prazepam, Netherlands: Reapam, Portugal: Demetrin, South Africa: Demetrin, Switzerland: Demetrin, Thailand: Pozapam; Prasepine.

== See also ==
- Benzodiazepine
- Benzodiazepine dependence
- Long-term effects of benzodiazepines
