= Oxazepam =

Benzodiazepine medication

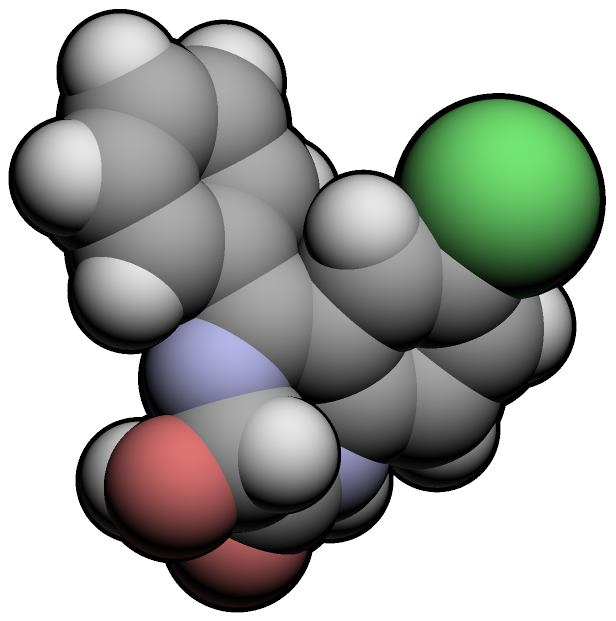

Clinical data
- Pronunciation: /ɒkˈsæzɪpæm/ ok-SAZ-i-pam
- Trade names: Serax, Alepam, Serepax, others
- Dependence liability: Moderate
- Addiction liability: Low–moderate
- Routes of administration: By mouth
- Drug class: Benzodiazepine
- ATC code: N05BA04 (WHO)

Legal status
- Legal status: AU: S4 (Prescription only); BR: Class B1 (Psychoactive drugs); CA: Schedule IV; DE: Prescription only (Anlage III for higher doses); US: Schedule IV; EU: Rx-only; SE: Förteckning IV

Pharmacokinetic data
- Bioavailability: 92.8%
- Metabolism: Hepatic (glucuronidation)
- Onset of action: 30 - 120 minutes
- Elimination half-life: 6–9 hours
- Duration of action: 6 - 12 hours
- Excretion: Renal

Identifiers
- IUPAC name: (RS)-7-Chloro-3-hydroxy-5-phenyl-1,3-dihydro-1,4-benzodiazepin-2-one
- CAS Number: 604-75-1
- PubChem CID: 4616
- IUPHAR/BPS: 7253
- DrugBank: DB00842
- ChemSpider: 4455
- UNII: 6GOW6DWN2A
- KEGG: D00464
- ChEBI: CHEBI:7823
- ChEMBL: ChEMBL568
- CompTox Dashboard (EPA): DTXSID1021087
- ECHA InfoCard: 100.009.161

Chemical and physical data
- Formula: C_{15}H_{11}ClN_{2}O_{2}
- Molar mass: 286.71 g·mol^{−1}
- 3D model (JSmol): Interactive image
- Melting point: 205 to 206 °C (401 to 403 °F)
- SMILES: O=C1Nc2ccc(Cl)cc2C(c2ccccc2)=NC1O
- InChI: InChI=1S/C15H11ClN2O2/c16-10-6-7-12-11(8-10)13(9-4-2-1-3-5-9)18-15(20)14(19)17-12/h1-8,15,18,20H; Key:IMAUTQQURLXUGJ-UHFFFAOYSA-N

Oxazepam is a short-to-intermediate-acting benzodiazepine. Oxazepam is used for the treatment of anxiety, insomnia, and to control symptoms of alcohol withdrawal syndrome.

It is a metabolite of diazepam, prazepam, and temazepam, and has moderate amnesic, anxiolytic, anticonvulsant, hypnotic, sedative, and skeletal muscle relaxant properties compared to other benzodiazepines.

It was patented in 1962 and approved for medical use in 1964.

== Medical uses ==
Oxazepam is an intermediate-acting benzodiazepine with a slow onset of action, so it is usually prescribed to individuals who have trouble staying asleep, rather than falling asleep. It is commonly prescribed for anxiety disorders with associated tension, irritability, and agitation. It is also prescribed for drug and alcohol withdrawal, and for anxiety associated with depression. Oxazepam is sometimes prescribed off-label to treat social phobia, post-traumatic stress disorder, insomnia, premenstrual syndrome, and other conditions.

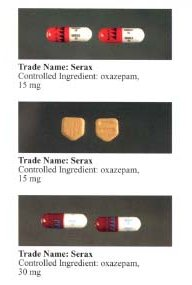

== Side effects ==
The side effects of oxazepam are similar to those of other benzodiazepines, and may include dizziness, drowsiness, headache, memory impairment, paradoxical excitement, and anterograde amnesia, but does not affect transient global amnesia. Withdrawal effects due to rapid decreases in dosage or abrupt discontinuation of oxazepam may include abdominal and muscle cramps, seizures, depression, insomnia, sweating, tremors, or nausea and vomiting.

In September 2020, the U.S. Food and Drug Administration (FDA) required the boxed warning be updated for all benzodiazepine medicines to describe the risks of abuse, misuse, addiction, physical dependence, and withdrawal reactions consistently across all the medicines in the class.

=== Tolerance, dependence and withdrawal ===
Oxazepam, as with other benzodiazepine drugs, can cause tolerance, physical dependence, addiction, and benzodiazepine withdrawal syndrome. Withdrawal from oxazepam or other benzodiazepines often leads to withdrawal symptoms which are similar to those seen during alcohol and barbiturate withdrawal. The higher the dose and the longer the drug is taken, the greater the risk of experiencing unpleasant withdrawal symptoms. Withdrawal symptoms can occur, though, at standard dosages and also after short-term use. Benzodiazepine treatment should be discontinued as soon as possible by a slow and gradual dose reduction regimen.

== Contraindications ==
Oxazepam is contraindicated in myasthenia gravis, chronic obstructive pulmonary disease, and limited pulmonary reserve, as well as severe hepatic disease.

== Special precautions ==
Benzodiazepines require special precautions if used in the elderly, during pregnancy, in children, alcohol- or drug-dependent individuals, and individuals with comorbid psychiatric disorders. Benzodiazepines including oxazepam are lipophilic drugs and rapidly penetrate membranes, so rapidly crosses over into the placenta with significant uptake of the drug. Use of benzodiazepines in late pregnancy, especially high doses, may result in floppy infant syndrome.

=== Pregnancy ===
Oxazepam, when taken during the third trimester, causes a definite risk to the neonate, including a severe benzodiazepine withdrawal syndrome including hypotonia, reluctance to suck, apnoeic spells, cyanosis, and impaired metabolic responses to cold stress. Floppy infant syndrome and sedation in the newborn may also occur. Symptoms of floppy infant syndrome and the neonatal benzodiazepine withdrawal syndrome have been reported to persist from hours to months after birth.

== Interactions ==
As oxazepam is an active metabolite of diazepam, an overlap in possible interactions is likely with other drugs or food, with exception of the pharmacokinetic CYP450 interactions (e.g. with cimetidine). Precautions and following the prescription are required when taking oxazepam (or other benzodiazepines) in combinations with antidepressants or opioids. Concurrent use of these medications can interact in a way that is difficult to predict. Drinking alcohol when taking oxazepam is not recommended. Concomitant use of oxazepam and alcohol can lead to increased sedation, memory impairment, ataxia, decreased muscle tone, and, in severe cases or in predisposed patients, respiratory depression and coma.

== Overdose ==
Oxazepam is generally less toxic in overdose than other benzodiazepines. Important factors which affect the severity of a benzodiazepine overdose include the dose ingested, the age of the patient, and health status prior to overdose. Benzodiazepine overdoses can be much more dangerous if a coingestion of other CNS depressants such as opiates or alcohol has occurred. Symptoms of an oxazepam overdose include:

- Respiratory depression
- Excessive somnolence
- Altered consciousness
- Central nervous system depression
- Occasionally cardiovascular and pulmonary toxicity
- Rarely, deep coma

== Pharmacology ==
Oxazepam is an intermediate-acting benzodiazepine of the 3-hydroxy family; it acts on benzodiazepine receptors, resulting in increased effect of GABA to the GABA_{A} receptor which results in inhibitory effects on the central nervous system. The half-life of oxazepam is between 6 and 9 hours. It has been shown to suppress cortisol levels. Oxazepam is the most slowly absorbed and has the slowest onset of action of all the common benzodiazepines according to one British study.

Oxazepam is an active metabolite formed during the breakdown of diazepam, nordazepam, and certain similar drugs. It may be safer than many other benzodiazepines in patients with impaired liver function because it does not require hepatic oxidation, but rather, it is simply metabolized by glucuronidation, so oxazepam is less likely to accumulate and cause adverse reactions in the elderly or people with liver disease. Oxazepam is similar to lorazepam in this respect. Preferential storage of oxazepam occurs in some organs, including the heart of the neonate. Absorption by any administered route and the risk of accumulation is significantly increased in the neonate, and withdrawal of oxazepam during pregnancy and breast feeding is recommended, as oxazepam is excreted in breast milk.

Two milligrams of oxazepam equates to 1 mg of diazepam according to the benzodiazepine equivalency converter, therefore 20 mg of oxazepam according to BZD equivalency equates to 10 mg of diazepam and 15 mg oxazepam to 7.5 mg diazepam (rounded up to 8 mg of diazepam). Some BZD equivalency converters use 3 to 1 (oxazepam to diazepam), 1 to 3 (diazepam to oxazepam) as the ratio (3:1 and 1:3), so 15 mg of oxazepam would equate to 5 mg of diazepam.

== Chemistry ==
Oxazepam exists as a racemic mixture. Early attempts to isolate enantiomers were unsuccessful; the corresponding acetate has been isolated as a single enantiomer. Given the different rates of epimerization that occur at different pH levels, it was determined that there would be no therapeutic benefit to the administration of a single enantiomer over the racemic mixture.

== Frequency of use ==
Oxazepam, along with diazepam, nitrazepam, and temazepam, were the four benzodiazepines listed on the pharmaceutical benefits scheme and represented 82% of the benzodiazepine prescriptions in Australia in 1990–1991. It is in several countries the benzodiazepine of choice for novice users, due to a low chance of accumulation and a relatively slow absorption speed.

== Society and culture ==
=== Misuse ===
Oxazepam has the potential for misuse, defined as taking the drug to achieve a high, or continuing to take the drug in the long term against medical advice. Benzodiazepines, including diazepam, oxazepam, nitrazepam, and flunitrazepam, accounted for the largest volume of forged drug prescriptions in Sweden from 1982 to 1986. During this time, a total of 52% of drug forgeries were for benzodiazepines, suggesting they were a major prescription drug class of abuse.

However, due to its slow rate of absorption and its slow onset of action, oxazepam has a relatively low potential for abuse compared to some other benzodiazepines, such as temazepam, flunitrazepam, or triazolam. This is similar to the varied potential for abuse between different drugs of the barbiturate class.

=== Legal status ===
Oxazepam is a Schedule IV drug under the Convention on Psychotropic Substances.

=== Brand names ===
Oxazepam is marketed under many brand names worldwide, including: Alepam, Alepan, Anoxa, Anxiolit, Comedormir, durazepam, Medopam, Murelax, Nozepam, Noripam, Oksazepam, Opamox, Ox-Pam, Oxa-CT, Oxabenz, Oxamin, Oxapam, Oxapax, Oxascand, Oxaze, Oxazepam, Oxazépam, Oxazin, Oxepam, Praxiten, Purata, Selars, Serax, Serepax, Seresta, Séresta, Serenid, Serpax, Sobril, Delipam, Tazepam, Vaben, and Youfei.

It is also marketed in combination with hyoscine as Novalona and in combination with alanine as Pausafrent T.

=== In popular culture ===
In Scrabble, "Oxazepam" is considered the third-highest scoring word, scoring 392 points when played in the ideal spot.

== Environmental concerns ==
In 2013, a laboratory study which exposed European perch to oxazepam concentrations equivalent to those present in European rivers (1.8 μg/L) found that they exhibited increased activity, reduced sociality, and higher feeding rate. In 2016, a follow-up study which exposed salmon smolt to oxazepam for seven days before letting them migrate observed increased intensity of migratory behaviour compared to controls. A 2019 study associated this faster, bolder behaviour in exposed smolt to increased mortality due to a higher likelihood of being predated on.

On the other hand, a 2018 study from the same authors, which kept 480 European perch and 12 northern pikes in 12 ponds over 70 days, half of them control and half spiked with oxazepam, found no significant difference in either perch growth or mortality. However, it suggested that the latter could be explained by the exposed perch and pike being equally hampered by oxazepam, rather than the lack of an overall effect. Lastly, a 2021 study built on these results by comparing two whole lakes filled with perch and pikes - one control while the other was exposed to oxazepam 11 days into experiment, at concentrations between 11 and 24 μg/L, which is 200 times greater than the reported concentrations in the European rivers. Even so, there were no measurable effects on pike behaviour after the addition of oxazepam, while the effects on perch behaviour were found to be negligible. The authors concluded that the effects previously attributed to oxazepam were instead likely caused by a combination of fish being stressed by human handling and small aquaria, followed by being exposed to a novel environment.

== See also ==
- Oxazepam hemisuccinate
