= Harry Eagle =

American physician

- Born: July 13, 1905; New York City, US
- Died: June 12, 1992 (aged 86); Port Chester, New York, US
- Education: Johns Hopkins University (B.S.); Johns Hopkins University School of Medicine (M.D.)
- Occupation: Physician
- Years active: 1927–1991
- Known for: Eagle's growth medium; development of VDRL test; treatment for arsenic poisoning
- Medical career
- Profession: Medicine
- Institutions: Johns Hopkins School of Medicine; National Institutes of Health; Albert Einstein College of Medicine
- Research: Microbiology, immunology, pathology
- Awards: Eli Lilly Award in Bacteriology (1936); Louisa Gross Horwitz Prize (1973); Sidney Farber Medical Research Award (1974); National Medal of Science (1987); Waterford International Biomedical Award

Harry Eagle (July 13, 1905 – June 12, 1992) was an American physician and pathologist. He was born in New York City then studied, and later worked, at Johns Hopkins University before moving on to the National Institutes of Health. From 1961 to 1988 he worked at the Albert Einstein College of Medicine. He is best known for Eagle's minimal essential medium, which is important in understanding how human and mammalian cells reproduce. He is also known for the Eagle effect. In 1936 he was the inaugural winner of the Eli Lilly and Company-Elanco Research Award. In 1973, he was a co-winner of the Louisa Gross Horwitz Prize of Columbia University. In 1987, he was awarded the National Medal of Science for his work in the Biological Sciences.

== Books ==
- Eagle, Harry (1937). Laboratory Diagnosis of Syphilis. St. Louis, Mo.: C.V. Mosby.

== Articles ==
- Darnell, James E.; Levintow, Leon; Scharff, Matthew D. (December 1970). "A Brief Chronicle on Harry Eagle". Journal of Cellular Physiology. 76 (3): 241–252. doi:10.1002/jcp.1040760304. PMID 4925975.
- Gilman, Alfred (September 1970). "Presentation of the Academy Medal to Harry Eagle, M.D." Bulletin of the New York Academy of Medicine. 46 (9): 666–669. PMC 1749767. PMID 4916300.
