= Paradoxical reaction =

Effect of drug opposite to expectation

A paradoxical reaction (or paradoxical effect) is an effect of a chemical substance, such as a medical drug, that is opposite to what would usually be expected. An example of a paradoxical reaction is pain caused by a pain relief medication.

== Substances ==
=== Amphetamines ===
Amphetamines are a class of psychoactive drugs that are stimulants. Paradoxical drowsiness can sometimes occur in adults. Research from the 1980s popularized the belief that ADHD stimulants such as amphetamine have a calming effect in individuals with ADHD, but opposite effects in the general population. Research in the early 2000s, however, disputes this claim, suggesting that ADHD stimulants have similar effects in adults with and without ADHD.

=== Antibiotics ===
The paradoxical effect or Eagle effect (named after Harry Eagle, who first described it) refers to an observation of an increase in survivors, seen when testing the activity of an antimicrobial agent. Initially when an antibiotic agent is added to a culture media, the number of bacteria that survive drops, as one would expect. But after increasing the concentration beyond a certain point, the number of bacteria that survive, paradoxically, increases.

=== Antidepressants ===
In a minority of cases, antidepressants can lead to violent thoughts of suicide or self-harm, as observed in some patients during and after treatment, which is in marked contrast to their intended effect. A 1991 study found that children and adolescents were more sensitive to paradoxical reactions of self-harm and suicidal ideation while taking fluoxetine (commonly known as Prozac).

=== Antipsychotics ===
Chlorpromazine, an antipsychotic and antiemetic drug which is classed as a "major" tranquilizer, may cause paradoxical effects such as agitation, hallucinations, excitement, insomnia, bizarre dreams, aggravation of psychotic symptoms and delirium.

These may be more common in elderly dementia patients. The apparent worsening of dementia may be due to the anticholinergic side effects of many antipsychotics.

=== Barbiturates ===
Phenobarbital can cause hyperactivity in children. This may follow after a small dose of 20 mg, on condition of no phenobarbital administered in previous days.

Barbiturates such as pentobarbital have been shown to cause paradoxical hyperactivity in an estimated 1% of children, who display symptoms similar to the hyperactive-impulsive subtype of attention deficit hyperactivity disorder. Intravenous caffeine administration can return these patients' behavior to baseline levels. A case report proposes a high rate (10-20%) of paradoxical response to anesthesia in ADHD patients, though this has not been objectively corroborated in controlled studies.

=== Benzodiazepines ===
Benzodiazepines, a class of psychoactive drugs called the "minor" tranquilizers, have varying hypnotic, sedative, anxiolytic, anticonvulsant, and muscle relaxing properties, but they may create the exact opposite effects. Susceptible individuals may respond to benzodiazepine treatment with an increase in anxiety, aggressiveness, agitation, confusion, disinhibition, loss of impulse control, talkativeness, violent behavior, and even convulsions. Paradoxical adverse effects may even lead to criminal behavior. Severe behavioral changes resulting from benzodiazepines have been reported including mania, hypomania, psychosis, anger and impulsivity.

Paradoxical rage reactions due to benzodiazepines occur as a result of an altered level of consciousness, which generates automatic behaviors, anterograde amnesia and uninhibited aggression. These aggressive reactions may be caused by a disinhibiting serotonergic mechanism.

Paradoxical effects of benzodiazepines appear to be dose-related, that is, likelier to occur with higher doses.

In a letter to the British Medical Journal, it was reported that a high proportion of parents referred for actual or threatened child abuse were taking medication at the time, often a combination of benzodiazepines and tricyclic antidepressants. Many mothers described that instead of feeling less anxious or depressed, they became more hostile and openly aggressive towards the child as well as to other family members while consuming tranquilizers. The author warned that environmental or social stresses such as difficulty coping with a crying baby combined with the effects of tranquilizers may precipitate a child abuse event.

Self-aggression has been reported and also demonstrated in laboratory conditions in a clinical study. Diazepam was found to increase people's willingness to harm themselves.

Benzodiazepines can sometimes cause a paradoxical worsening of EEG readings in patients with seizure disorders.

=== Caffeine ===
Caffeine is believed by many to cause paradoxical calmness or sedation in individuals with ADHD. There is insufficient evidence to determine if sedation caused by caffeine is due to a true paradoxical reaction, or rather from dehydration and sleep deprivation caused by the caffeine. Furthermore, there are no conclusive studies showing a differential effect of caffeine in individuals with ADHD compared to the general population.

=== Naltrexone ===
Naltrexone blocks the opioid receptors, acting opposite to most opioid pain medications. It can be used to negate the effects of opioid painkillers. At doses around one-tenth of the typical dose, naltrexone has been used for pain relief. Low-dose naltrexone is believed to have an anti-inflammatory effect. This is an off-label use and not widely accepted by the medical and scientific community.

=== Diphenhydramine ===
Diphenhydramine (often referred to by the trade name Benadryl) is an anticholinergic antihistamine medicine commonly used to treat allergic reactions and symptoms of a common cold, such as coughing. Its central antihistaminergic properties also cause it to act as a sedative, and for this reason it is also used to treat insomnia. Diphenhydramine is also used off-label for its sedative properties, particularly by parents seeking to make their children sedated or sleep during long-haul flights. This use of diphenhydramine has been criticized for a number of reasons, ranging from ethical to safety concerns, but also due to the risk of diphenhydramine's paradoxical reaction, which induces hyperactivity and irritability. This phenomenon can also be observed in adults who use the medication as a sleep aid. The prevalence of this paradoxical reaction is unknown, but research into the phenomenon suggests that it may be as a result of the medicine's interactions with the CYP2D6 enzyme, and that a metabolite of diphenhydramine may be to blame.

== Causes ==
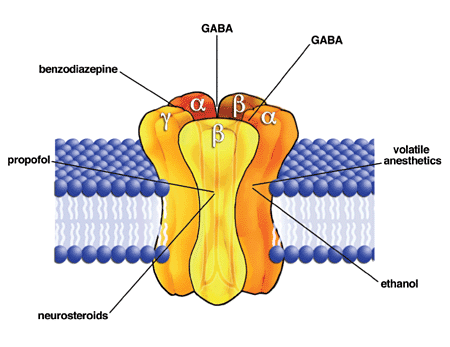
GABA_{A} receptor with its five subunits and where various ligands bind.

The mechanism of a paradoxical reaction has as yet (2019) not been fully clarified, in no small part due to the fact that signal transfer of single neurons in subcortical areas of the human brain is usually not accessible.

There are, however, multiple indications that paradoxical reactions upon – for example – benzodiazepines, barbiturates, inhalational anesthetics, propofol, neurosteroids, and alcohol are associated with structural deviations of GABA_{A} receptors. The combination of the five subunits of the receptor (see image) can be altered in such a way that for example, the receptor's response to GABA remains unchanged but the response to one of the named substances is dramatically different from the normal one.

== See also ==
- Adverse drug reaction (ADR)
- Drug-drug interaction (DDI)
- Idiosyncratic drug reaction
- Iatrogenesis
