= Fibromyalgia =

Chronic multi-symptomatic pain disorder

- Other names: Fibromyalgia syndrome
- Possible pain areas in the most used fibromyalgia diagnosis criteria (ACR 2016)
- Pronunciation: /ˌfaɪbroʊmaɪˈældʒə/
- Specialty: Pain medicine, rheumatology, primary care
- Symptoms: Widespread pain, fatigue, sleep problems
- Usual onset: Early–middle age
- Duration: Long term
- Causes: Uncertain
- Diagnostic method: Based on symptoms after ruling out other potential causes
- Differential diagnosis: Anemia, autoimmune disorders (such as ankylosing spondylitis, polymyalgia rheumatica, rheumatoid arthritis, scleroderma, or multiple sclerosis), Lyme disease, osteoarthritis, thyroid disease
- Treatment: Sufficient sleep and exercise, medication
- Medication: Cyclobenzaprine, duloxetine, milnacipran, pregabalin
- Prognosis: Normal life expectancy
- Frequency: 2%

Fibromyalgia (FM) is a long-term condition characterised by widespread chronic pain. Other symptoms can include fatigue, trouble thinking or remembering, waking up tired (unrefreshed), pain or cramps in the lower abdomen, depression, or headache. The causes of fibromyalgia are unknown, with several pathophysiologies proposed.

Fibromyalgia is estimated to affect 2 to 4% of the population. Women are affected at a higher rate than men. Rates appear similar across areas of the world and among varied cultures. Fibromyalgia was first recognised in the 1950s, and defined in 1990, with updated criteria in 2011, 2016, and 2019.

The treatment of fibromyalgia is symptomatic and multidisciplinary. Aerobic and strengthening exercise is recommended. Duloxetine, milnacipran, and pregabalin can give short-term pain relief to some people with FM. Symptoms of fibromyalgia persist long-term in most patients.

Fibromyalgia is associated with a significant economic and social burden, and it can cause substantial functional impairment among people with the condition. People with fibromyalgia can be subjected to significant stigma and doubt about the legitimacy of their symptoms, including in the healthcare system. FM is associated with relatively high suicide rates.

== Terminology ==
The term "fibromyalgia" was derived from Neo-Latin fibro- (meaning 'fibrous tissues'), Greek μυο- (myo-, 'muscle'), and Greek άλγος (algos, 'pain'). Thus, the term literally means "muscle and fibrous connective tissue pain". Thus, this term is inaccurate and misleading, as it only reflects a part of the symptom set. The term "FM" is increasingly used.

== Classification ==
=== ICD-11 ===
Fibromyalgia is not listed as a code in the ICD-11.

"Fibromyalgia syndrome" is listed as an inclusion in the ICD-11 code of "Chronic widespread pain" (CWP) (code MG30.01). (No other signs or symptoms of fibromyalgia are mentioned.)

=== Other classifications ===
Research seeing FM as a subset of chronic widespread pain has estimated the population prevalence of chronic widespread pain as 11% and of fibromyalgia as 2–6%.

FM has been seen as a functional somatic syndrome condition, although this term does not appear in the ICD-11.

=== Subgroups or clusters within FM ===
There may be clusters of symptom characteristics within fibromyalgia. A 2024 systematic review found that fibromyalgia could be clustered according to symptom severity, adjustment to the condition, thermal pain sensitivity, personality, and response to treatment. However it stated there was a need for more objective measures, and for more validation and replication of clusters. Clustering has also been undertaken based on psychological and coping characteristics of FM people.

== Signs and symptoms ==
The characteristic symptom of fibromyalgia is chronic widespread pain. The current prevalent diagnosis method also requires an above-threshold severity score from among six other symptoms: fatigue, trouble thinking or remembering, waking up tired (unrefreshed), pain or cramps in the lower abdomen, depression, and headache. Many other symptoms can be present. The key symptoms of fibromyalgia often present concurrently, in varying severity, and are intertwined with and influence each other.

=== Chronic pain ===
Chronic pain continues to be regarded as the core characteristic of fibromyalgia. According to the NHS, widespread pain is a major symptom, which could feel like an ache, a burning sensation, or a sharp, stabbing pain. Patients are also susceptible to pain, and the slightest touch can cause pain. Pain also tends to linger for a longer period when a patient experiences it. The pain associated with fibromyalgia is often a constant dull ache that has lasted for at least three months, occurring on both sides of the body and above and below the waist.

Pain in fibromyalgia may include contributions from central pain, peripheral musculoskeletal pain generators, neuropathic pain, and other pathways.

Men may be affected by FM pain differently to women.

=== Fatigue ===
Fatigue is a common symptom of fibromyalgia. Patients may experience physical or mental fatigue. Physical fatigue can present as a feeling of exhaustion after exercise or limitation in daily activities. Fibromyalgia fatigue can range from feeling mildly tired to flu-like exhaustion. Severe fatigue may come on suddenly, making it difficult to be active at all. The impact of fatigue can be severe and pose more of a problem than the pain. Fatigue is a complicated, multifactorial, and vexing symptom that is highly prevalent (76%) and stubbornly persistent, as evidenced by longitudinal studies over 5 years. Fatigue does not improve with sleep or rest. Medication seems to have little impact on FM fatigue.

=== Sleep problems ===
Sleep disturbances are extremely common in fibromyalgia and may occur in up to 90% of patients. These disturbances frequently include non-restorative sleep, morning tiredness, and daytime somnolence. Although patients often report poor sleep quality, insomnia itself is not considered a typical or defining feature of fibromyalgia. Instead, individuals may obtain a normal duration of sleep but still wake feeling unrefreshed due to abnormalities in sleep architecture and pain-related disruptions in restorative sleep stages.

A meta-analysis compared quantitative and qualitative sleep metrics in people with fibromyalgia and healthy people. Individuals with fibromyalgia reported lower sleep quality and efficiency, longer wake time after sleep onset, shorter sleep duration, lighter sleep, and greater difficulty initiating sleep, both quantitatively and qualitatively.

Improving sleep quality can help people with fibromyalgia manage pain.

=== Cognitive problems ("fibro fog") ===
Many people with fibromyalgia experience cognitive problems often known as "fibro fog". The CDC and the American Pain Society recognize these problems as a major feature of fibromyalgia.

About 75% of people with fibromyalgia report significant problems with concentration, memory, and multitasking. A 2018 meta-analysis found that the largest differences between people with fibromyalgia and healthy subjects were in inhibitory control, memory, and processing speed. A 2023 scoping review grouped effects into subjective cognitive dysfunction, perceived variability, changes in functional activities, and participation limitations.

A 2017 review found that the neuropsychological mechanisms underlying brain fog may be similar to those in isolated functional cognitive disorders. One hypothesis is that chronic pain in fibromyalgia compromises attention systems, resulting in cognitive problems.

=== Other signs and symptoms ===
People with fibromyalgia may experience hyperalgesia (abnormally increased sensitivity to pain) and allodynia (pain from a stimulus that does not normally elicit pain). People with FM may be intolerant to bright lights, loud noises, perfumes, and cold. Other symptoms may be musculoskeletal stiffness, environmental sensitivity, hypervigilance, sexual dysfunction, and visual symptoms. Nocturnal myoclonus can be present in people with fibromyalgia. A 2021 review found that fibromyalgia can also cause ocular discomfort (foreign body sensation and irritation) and visual disturbances (blurred vision).

=== Comorbidity ===
Fibromyalgia as a stand-alone diagnosis is uncommon, as most fibromyalgia patients often have other chronic overlapping pain problems, mental disorders or other medical conditions. Comorbidities may be associated with more intense pain and other symptoms.

Fibromyalgia is associated with mental health issues, including anxiety, post-traumatic stress disorder (PTSD), bipolar disorder, alexithymia, and depressive disorders. Approximately one-third of patients presenting with an FM diagnosis also meet the criteria for PTSD, and are five times more likely to have major depressive disorder than the general population.

The pain and limited energy of fibromyalgia often leads to less activity, leading to social isolation and increased stress levels—both of which tend to cause anxiety and depression. Separation of depression symptoms from those of fibromyalgia is difficult.

Chronic pain conditions are often comorbid with fibromyalgia, including neuropathic pain, chronic tension headaches, myofascial pain syndrome, and temporomandibular joint dysfunction. Neurological disorders that have been linked to pain or fibromyalgia include multiple sclerosis, post-polio syndrome, and Parkinson's disease.

Fibromyalgia may share pathogenetic overlap with other syndromes, including myalgic encephalomyelitis/chronic fatigue syndrome and irritable bowel syndrome (IBS).

Fibromyalgia has been reported to occur as a comorbidity in 20–30% of individuals with rheumatic diseases, including rheumatoid arthritis (RA). It has also been reported in people with noninflammatory musculoskeletal disorders.

The prevalence of fibromyalgia in gastrointestinal disease has been described mostly for celiac disease and irritable bowel syndrome. IBS and fibromyalgia may share similar pathogenic mechanisms involving mast cell abnormalities, inflammatory biomarkers, hormones, and neurotransmitters such as serotonin. Dysbiosis alters serotonin transmission, leading to autonomic nervous system hyperstimulation.

Other conditions that are associated with fibromyalgia include obesity, connective tissue disease, cardiovascular autonomic abnormalities, obstructive sleep apnea (hypopnea syndrome), restless legs syndrome, and overactive bladder.

== Causal and risk factors ==
The cause of fibromyalgia is unknown. However, several risk factors, genetic and environmental, have been identified.

Fibromyalgia may have a variety of causal factors, including disease, trauma, psychological and social emotional factors. Thus more than one pathophysiological state may cause fibromyalgia.

=== Genetics ===
Genetics plays a major role in fibromyalgia and may explain up to 50% of disease susceptibility. Fibromyalgia is potentially associated with polymorphisms of genes in the serotonergic, dopaminergic and catecholaminergic systems. Several genes have been suggested as candidates for susceptibility to fibromyalgia. These include a coding variation in Huntingtin, SLC6A4, TRPV2, MYT1L, NRXN3, and the 5-HT2A receptor 102T/C polymorphism. The heritability of fibromyalgia is estimated to be higher in patients younger than 50.

Nearly all the genes suggested as potential risk factors for fibromyalgia are associated with neurotransmitters and their receptors.

=== Stress and adverse life experiences ===
Stress may be a precipitating factor in the development of fibromyalgia. A 2018 systematic review found low quality evidence supporting an association between fibromyalgia and traumatic events, and noted a lack of prospective studies. A 2021 meta-analysis of case-control studies found abuse and other lifetime stressors to be strongly associated with fibromyalgia. People with fibromyalgia had approximately three times the odds of reporting any type of abuse, and approximately twice the odds of reporting medical trauma or other stressors. A 2024 review of violence and chronic pain in women found "strong associations between an adult history of violent victimization and chronic pain" and that "the impact of violence on fibromyalgia was significant." A 2014 review argued that existing evidence entailed too many methodological limitations, such as reliance on recollections and confounding, to support that physical trauma could cause fibromyalgia.

Some of the other FM risk markers below may include stress elements.

=== Other risk markers ===
FM prevalence rates appear higher when COVID-19 infections have occurred.

Other risk markers for fibromyalgia include or potentially include premature birth, female sex, childhood cognitive and psychosocial problems, primary pain disorders, multiregional pain, infectious illness, hypermobility of joints, iron deficiency, and small-fiber polyneuropathy. Fibromyalgia has also been linked with metal-induced allergic inflammation, especially in response to nickel but also inorganic mercury, cadmium, and lead.

A 2022 review found that between 6% and 27% of people with FM reported an infectious inciting event (e.g. Epstein-Barr virus, Lyme disease), with up to 40% describing worsening symptoms after infection.

=== Factors found not to correlate with fibromyalgia ===
Studies on personality and fibromyalgia have shown inconsistent results. Although some have suggested that fibromyalgia patients are more likely to have specific personality traits, it appears that, in comparison to other diseases, when anxiety and depression are statistically controlled for, personality has less relevance, and does not differ from healthy controls.

== Pathophysiology ==
As of 2026, the pathophysiology of fibromyalgia had not yet been elucidated. The prevailing view was that the fibromyalgia resulted from an amplification of pain by the central nervous system, but other hypotheses have also been suggested.

=== Nervous system ===
Chronic pain can be divided into three categories. Nociceptive pain is pain caused by inflammation or damage to tissues. Neuropathic pain is pain caused by nerve damage. Nociplastic pain (or central sensitization) is less understood and is the common explanation of the pain experienced in fibromyalgia. Because the three forms of pain can overlap, fibromyalgia patients may experience nociceptive (e.g., rheumatic illnesses) and neuropathic (e.g., small fiber peripheral neuropathy) pain in addition to nociplastic pain.

==== Central nervous system ====
Fibromyalgia can be viewed as a condition defined by nociplastic pain. Nociplastic pain is caused by altered function of pain-related sensory pathways in the periphery and the central nervous system, resulting in hypersensitivity. As of 2023, the underlying processes of nociplastic pain remain poorly understood. Nociplastic pain may be caused by either (1) increased processing of pain stimuli or (2) decreased suppression of pain stimuli at several levels in the nervous system, or both. Nociplastic pain has been referred to as "Nociplastic pain syndrome" because it is coupled with other symptoms including fatigue, sleep disturbance, cognitive disturbance, hypersensitivity to environmental stimuli, anxiety, and depression. Nociplastic pain states can be triggered by a variety of stressors such as trauma, infections, and chronic stressors. A 2024 review reported that symptoms such as fatigue, sleep, memory, and mood problems, and sensitivity to non-painful sensory stimuli were also CNS-driven symptoms that were inherent to nociplastic pain.

In 2023, the "Fibromyalgia: Imbalance of Threat and Soothing Systems" (FITSS) model was suggested as a working hypothesis. According to the FITSS model, the salience network (also known as the midcingulo-insular network) may remain continuously hyperactive due to an imbalance in emotional self-regulation, which is reflected by an overactive "threat" system and an underactive "soothing" system. This hyperactivation, along with other mechanisms, may contribute to fibromyalgia.

Neuroimaging studies have observed that fibromyalgia patients have increased grey matter in the right postcentral gyrus and left angular gyrus, and decreased grey matter in the right cingulate gyrus, right paracingulate gyrus, left cerebellum, and left gyrus rectus. These regions are associated with affective and cognitive functions and with motor adaptations to pain processing. Other studies have documented decreased grey matter of the default mode network in people with fibromyalgia. These deficits are associated with pain processing.

According to a 2024 review article the evidence for central sensitization as an underlying mechanism in chronic pain conditions such as fibromyalgia has significant limitations, such as failing to demonstrate causality, and the use of measures described as measuring central sensitization which do not measure it as a neurophysiological phenomenon, leading to circular reasoning.

==== Peripheral and autonomic nervous systems ====
An alternative hypothesis to nociplastic pain views fibromyalgia as a stress-related dysautonomia with neuropathic pain features. This view highlights the role of autonomic and peripheral nociceptive nervous systems in the generation of widespread pain, fatigue, and insomnia. The description of small fiber neuropathy in a subgroup of fibromyalgia patients supports the disease neuropathic-autonomic underpinning. However, others claim that small fiber neuropathy occurs only in small groups of those with fibromyalgia.

Some suggest that fibromyalgia is caused or maintained by decreased vagal tone, as indicated by low heart rate variability, signaling a heightened sympathetic response. Accordingly, several studies show that clinical improvement is associated with an increase in heart rate variability. Some examples of interventions that increase the heart rate variability and vagal tone are meditation, yoga, mindfulness, and exercise.

==== Neurochemical and neuroendocrine ====
Some neurochemical abnormalities that occur in fibromyalgia also regulate mood, sleep, and energy, thus explaining why mood, sleep, and fatigue problems are commonly co-morbid with fibromyalgia. Serotonin is the most widely studied neurotransmitter in fibromyalgia. It is hypothesized that an imbalance in the serotonergic system may lead to the development of fibromyalgia. There is also some data that suggests altered dopaminergic and noradrenergic signaling in fibromyalgia. Supporting the monoamine related theories is the efficacy of monoaminergic antidepressants in fibromyalgia. Glutamate/creatine ratios within the bilateral ventrolateral prefrontal cortex were found to be significantly higher in fibromyalgia patients than in controls and may disrupt glutamate neurotransmission. Studies on the neuroendocrine system and HPA axis in fibromyalgia have been inconsistent. The depressed function of the HPA axis results in adrenal insufficiency and potentially chronic fatigue.

=== Metabolic and proteomic evidence ===
Pro-oxidative processes correlate with pain in fibromyalgia patients. Decreased mitochondrial membrane potential, increased superoxide activity, and increased lipid peroxidation production are observed. The high proportion of lipids in the central nervous system (CNS) makes the CNS especially vulnerable to free radical damage. Levels of lipid peroxidation products correlate with fibromyalgia symptoms. Fibromyalgia is associated with the deregulation of proteins related to complement and coagulation cascades, as well as to iron metabolism. An excessive oxidative stress response may cause dysregulation of many proteins.

=== Immune system ===
Inflammation has been suggested to have a role in the pathogenesis of fibromyalgia. People with fibromyalgia tend to have higher levels of inflammatory cytokines IL-6, and IL-8. There are also increased levels of the pro-inflammatory cytokines IL-1 receptor antagonist. Increased levels of pro-inflammatory cytokines may increase sensitivity to pain, and contribute to mood problems. Anti-inflammatory interleukins such as IL-10 have also been associated with fibromyalgia. Neurogenic inflammation has been proposed as a contributing factor to fibromyalgia. A repeated observation shows that autoimmunity triggers, such as traumas and infections, are among the most frequent events preceding the onset of fibromyalgia. A 2024 discussion concluded that the complexity of FM may mean both autoimmune and non-autoimmune mechanisms occur in FM, possibly in different subgroups of FM.

=== Digestive system ===
Though there is a lack of evidence in this area, it is hypothesized that gut microbiome may play a role in fibromyalgia. People with fibromyalgia are more likely to show dysbiosis, a decrease in microbiota diversity. There is a bidirectional interplay between the gut and the nervous system. Therefore, the gut can affect the nervous system, but the nervous system can also affect the gut. Neurological effects mediated via the autonomic nervous system as well as the hypothalamic pituitary adrenal axis are directed to intestinal functional effector cells, which in turn are under the influence of the gut microbiota.

The gut-brain axis, which connects the gut microbiota to the brain via the enteric nervous system, is another area of research. Fibromyalgia patients have less varied gut flora and altered serum metabolome levels of glutamate and serine, implying abnormalities in neurotransmitter metabolism.

== Diagnosis ==
Diagnosis of fibromyalgia is hampered by the lack of any single pathological feature, laboratory finding, or biomarker. In most cases, people with fibromyalgia symptoms may have laboratory test results that appear normal, and many of their symptoms may mimic those of other rheumatic conditions such as arthritis or osteoporosis.

Specific diagnostic criteria for fibromyalgia have evolved.

=== Diagnostic criteria ===
The 2016 diagnostic criteria of the American College of Rheumatology require all of the following:

1. "Generalized pain, defined as pain in at least 4 of 5 regions, is present."
2. "Symptoms have been present at a similar level for at least 3 months."
3. "Widespread pain index (WPI) ≥ 7 and symptom severity scale (SSS) score ≥ 5 OR WPI of 4–6 and SSS score ≥ 9."
4. "A diagnosis of fibromyalgia is valid irrespective of other diagnoses. A diagnosis of fibromyalgia does not exclude the presence of other clinically important illnesses."

Widespread pain index (WPI) areas

- The 5 body regions are right upper, left upper, right lower, left lower, and axial.
- The Widespread Pain Index (WPI) was introduced by the American College of Rheumatology in 2010. It measures the number of body regions experiencing pain, out of a total of 19: left and right shoulder girdle, upper arm, lower arm, hip/buttock/trochanter, upper leg, lower leg, and jaw; plus the chest, abdomen, neck, upper back and lower back.
- The Symptom Severity Scale (SSS) assesses the severity of six symptoms; fatigue (score 0-3, for no problem, mild, moderate and severe), trouble thinking or remembering (0-3), waking up tired (unrefreshed) (0-3), pain or cramps in lower abdomen (0-1), depression (0-1) and headache (0-1).

As of 2022, among diagnosis methods in the US, the ACR 2016 criteria have been judged as the best FM diagnosis criteria available. The UK RCP also recommends these criteria for FM diagnosis. A similar diagnostic approach is taken in Germany.

The nine possible pain sites used in the 2019 APS FM diagnostic criteria.

In 2019, the American Pain Society in collaboration with the U.S. Food and Drug Administration developed a new diagnostic system using two dimensions. The first dimension included core diagnostic criteria, and the second included common features.

The core diagnostic criteria are:

1. Multisite pain is defined as six or more pain sites from a total of nine possible sites (head, arms, chest, abdomen, upper back, lower back, and legs), for at least three months
2. Moderate to severe sleep problems or fatigue, for at least three months

A 2025 review found that challenges and limitations continue, due to patients over- or under-estimating their symptoms, or describing them differently. Some people can move into and out of an FM diagnostic level over time as their symptoms vary.

=== Scales for fibromyalgia severity ===
The Fibromyalgia Impact Questionnaire (FIQ) was introduced in 1991 and the Revised Fibromyalgia Impact Questionnaire (FIQR) in 2009. It is used as a way of measuring the impact of fibromyalgia on living, although there is some debate on ratings scales.

The polysymptomatic distress scale (PSD) was derived from the 2010 ACR diagnosis criteria and aimed to measure FM severity.

=== Differential diagnosis ===
Components of a differential diagnosis include

- The person's medical history; early chronic pain, a childhood history of pain, an emergence of broad pain following physical or psychosocial stress, a general hypersensitivity to touch, smell, noise, taste, hypervigilance, and various somatic symptoms (gastrointestinal, urology, gynecology, neurology) may signal FM.
- A physical examination and laboratory investigations may be used to eliminate alternative causes. Common tests that are conducted include complete blood count, comprehensive metabolic panel, erythrocyte sedimentation rate, C-reactive protein, and thyroid function test.

Possible misdiagnoses are

- Early undiagnosed rheumatic diseases such as preclinical rheumatoid arthritis, early stages of inflammatory spondyloarthritis, polymyalgia rheumatica, myofascial pain syndromes and hypermobility syndrome.
- Neurological diseases that can have important pain and fatigue components include multiple sclerosis, Parkinson's disease and peripheral neuropathy.
- Other medical illnesses that should be ruled out are endocrine disease or metabolic disorder (hypothyroidism, hyperparathyroidism, acromegaly, vitamin D deficiency), gastro-intestinal disease (celiac and non-celiac gluten sensitivity), infectious diseases (Lyme disease, hepatitis C and immunodeficiency disease) and the early stages of a malignancy such as multiple myeloma, metastatic cancer and leukemia/lymphoma.
- Other systemic, inflammatory, endocrine, rheumatic, infectious, and neurologic disorders may cause fibromyalgia-like symptoms, such as systemic lupus erythematosus, Sjögren's disease, ankylosing spondylitis, Ehlers-Danlos syndromes, psoriatic-related polyenthesitis, a nerve compression syndrome (such as carpal tunnel syndrome), and myasthenia gravis.
- Several medications can evoke pain (statins, aromatase inhibitors, bisphosphonates, and opioids).

== Management ==
Management of FM symptoms, to improve quality of life, often uses integrated pharmacological and non-pharmacological approaches. There is no single intervention shown to be effective for all patients. A personalized, multidisciplinary approach to treatment that includes pharmacologic considerations and begins with effective patient education is most beneficial. Self-help can play a role.

Several associations have published guidelines for the diagnosis and management of fibromyalgia, including the German Federal Ministry of Health in 2022, Italian guidelines in 2021, the European League Against Rheumatism in 2017, (Note: This allowed a quick diagnosis and patient education. Initial management should be non-pharmacological; later, pharmacological treatment can be added.: The strongest recommendations were for aerobic and strengthening exercise.; Weak recommendations were for Qigong, yoga, and tai chi for improving sleep and quality of life, for mindfulness for improving pain and quality of life, for acupuncture and hydrotherapy for improving pain, and psychotherapy as more suitable for patients with mood disorders or unhelpful coping strategies.; Chiropractic was strongly recommended against, due to safety concerns.; Medications weakly recommended for severe pain were (duloxetine, pregabalin, tramadol) or sleep disturbance (amitriptyline, cyclobenzaprine, pregabalin).; Medications not recommended due to a lack of efficacy were (nonsteroidal anti-inflammatory drugs, monoamine oxidase inhibitors and selective serotonin reuptake inhibitors).; Medications strongly recommended against, due to lack of efficacy and side effects, were growth hormone, sodium oxybate, opioids, and steroids.) and the Canadian Pain Society in 2012.

=== Mental tools ===
FM can cause negative mental effects. German guidance encourages FM patients to focus on coping with symptoms (instead of fighting the syndrome), on aspects of life which are important to them, on ceasing perfectionism, and on establishing and respecting their limits.

In a 2020 Cochrane review, cognitive behavioral therapy (CBT) was found to have a small but beneficial effect for reducing pain and distress, but adverse events were not well evaluated. CBT and related psychological and behavioral therapies have a small to moderate effect in reducing symptoms of fibromyalgia. Effect sizes tend to be small when psychological therapies are used as treatment for patients with fibromyalgia, and are comparable to the effect sizes seen with other drug and pain treatments. Multicomponent treatment appears to have greater efficacy than any individual treatment. Several reviews have found that CBT has no significant effect in pain reduction, although it does improve sleep quality. There is also limited evidence that acceptance and commitment therapy improves outcomes such as health-related quality of life and pain acceptance.

Patient education is recommended by the European League Against Rheumatism (EULAR) as an important treatment component. As of 2022, there is only low-quality evidence showing that patient education can decrease pain and fibromyalgia impact.

Sleep hygiene interventions show low effectiveness in improving insomnia in people with chronic pain.

=== Exercise ===
In 2017, exercise was the only fibromyalgia treatment given a strong recommendation by the European Alliance of Associations for Rheumatology (EULAR). There is strong evidence indicating that exercise improves fitness, sleep and quality of life and may reduce pain and fatigue for people with fibromyalgia. The rate of adverse events reported in studies of exercise is low, with the most common being muscle pain, and no serious adverse events reported.

There are several hypothesized biological mechanisms for exercise benefits in FM. Exercise may improve pain modulation through serotonergic pathways. It may reduce pain by altering the hypothalamic-pituitary-adrenal axis and reducing cortisol levels. It also has anti-inflammatory effects that may improve fibromyalgia symptoms. Aerobic exercise can improve muscle metabolism and pain through mitochondrial pathways.

Despite its benefits, exercise is a challenge for patients with fibromyalgia, due to the chronic fatigue and pain they experience. They may have negative experiences with being given non-personalized exercise programs by healthcare providers who they feel do not understand the impact of the condition. Adherence is higher when the exercise program is recommended by doctors or supervised by nurses. Sufferers perceive exercise as more effortful than healthy adults. Depression and higher pain intensity serve as barriers to physical activity.

A recommended approach to a graded exercise program begins with small, frequent exercise periods and builds up from there. To reduce pain the use of an exercise program of 13 to 24 weeks is recommended, with each session lasting 30 to 60 minutes.

When different exercise programs are compared, aerobic exercise is capable of modulating the autonomic nervous function of fibromyalgia patients, whereas resistance exercise does not show such effects. A 2022 meta-analysis found that aerobic training showed a high effect size while strength interventions showed moderate effects. Meditative exercise seems preferable for improving sleep, with no differences between resistance, flexibility, and aquatic exercise in their favorable effects on fatigue.

==== Aerobic ====
Aerobic exercise for fibromyalgia patients is the most investigated type of exercise. It includes activities such as walking, jogging, spinning, cycling, dancing and exercising in water, with walking being named as one of the best methods. A 2017 Cochrane summary concluded that aerobic exercise probably improves quality of life, slightly decreases pain and improves physical function and makes no difference in fatigue and stiffness. A 2019 meta-analysis showed that exercising aerobically can reduce autonomic dysfunction and increase heart rate variability. This happens when patients exercise at least twice a week, for 45–60 minutes at about 60%–80% of the maximum heart rate. Aerobic exercise also decreases anxiety and depression, and improves the quality of life. Exercising aerobically 2–3 times a week has been shown to alleviate pain.

==== Resistance ====
In resistance exercise, participants apply a load to their body using weights, elastic bands, body weight, or other measures.

Two meta-analyses on fibromyalgia have shown that resistance training can reduce anxiety and depression, one found that it decreases pain and disease severity and one found that it improves quality of life. Resistance training may also improve sleep, with a greater effect than that of flexibility training and a similar effect to that of aerobic exercise.

The dosage of resistance exercise for women with fibromyalgia was studied in a 2022 meta-analysis. Effective dosages were found when exercising twice a week, for at least eight weeks. Symptom improvement was found for even low dosages such as 1–2 sets of 4–20 repetitions. Most studies use moderate exercise intensity of 40% to 85% one-repetition maximum. This intensity was effective in reducing pain. Some treatment regimes increase the intensity over time (from 40% to 80%), whereas others increase it when the participant can perform 12 repetitions. High-intensity exercises may cause lower treatment adherence.

==== Other exercise types ====
A 2021 meta-analysis found that meditative exercise programs (tai chi, yoga, qigong) were superior to other forms of exercise (aerobic, flexibility, resistance) in improving sleep quality. Other meta-analyses also found positive effects of tai chi for sleep, fibromyalgia symptoms, and pain, fatigue, depression and quality of life. These tai chi interventions frequently included 1-hour sessions practiced 1–3 times a week for 12 weeks. Meditative exercises, as a whole, may achieve desired outcomes through biological mechanisms such as antioxidation, anti-inflammation, reduction in sympathetic activity, and modulation of glucocorticoid receptor sensitivity.

Several reviews and meta-analyses suggest that aquatic training can improve symptoms and wellness in people with fibromyalgia. It is recommended to practice aquatic therapy at least twice a week using a low to moderate intensity. However, aquatic therapy does not appear to be superior to other types of exercise.

Combinations of different exercises, such as flexibility and aerobic training, may improve stiffness. However, the evidence is of low-quality. It is not clear if flexibility training alone, compared to aerobic training, is effective at reducing symptoms or has any adverse effects. According to a 2017 systematic review it is uncertain whether vibration training in combination with exercise may improve pain, fatigue, and stiffness.

=== Medications ===
The US Food and Drug Administration (FDA) and Health Canada have approved pregabalin (an anticonvulsant) and duloxetine (a serotonin–norepinephrine reuptake inhibitor) for the management of fibromyalgia. The FDA also approved milnacipran (another serotonin–norepinephrine reuptake inhibitor), but the European Medicines Agency refused marketing authority.

In 2025, the US Food and Drug Administration (FDA) approved TNX-102 SL, as Tonmya, for the management of fibromyalgia, making it the first new FDA-approved fibromyalgia therapy in over 15 years. (NDA 219428)

A 2024 overview of Cochrane reviews concluded that the FDA-approved medications: duloxetine, milnacipran, or pregabalin were the only ones with evidence of efficacy. About 10% of patients with moderate or severe pain using them experienced a reduction of at least 50% in their pain. Another 2024 review found that currently available pharmacological options appeared to be limited in efficacy for FM.

Fibromyalgia is often treated or managed with meds including amitriptyline, citalopram, duloxetine, fluoxetine, paroxetine and sertraline.

The length of time that medications take to be effective at reducing symptoms can vary. Any potential benefits from the antidepressant amitriptyline may take up to three months to take effect, and it may take between three and six months for duloxetine, milnacipran, and pregabalin to be effective at improving symptoms. Some medications have the potential to cause withdrawal symptoms when stopping, so gradual discontinuation may be warranted, particularly for antidepressants and pregabalin.

==== Antidepressants ====
Antidepressants are one of the common drugs for fibromyalgia. Antidepressants can improve the quality of life for fibromyalgia patients in the medium term. Duloxetine and milnacipran have good evidence of substantial pain relief, with no increased risk for serious adverse effects.

A 2023 meta-analysis found that duloxetine improved fibromyalgia symptoms, regardless of the dosage. SSRIs may be also be used to treat depression in people diagnosed with fibromyalgia.

While amitriptyline has been used as a first-line treatment, the quality of evidence to support this use is poor.

Very weak evidence indicates that a very small number of people may benefit from treatment with the tetracyclic antidepressant mirtazapine, however, for most, the potential benefits are not great and the risk of adverse effects and potential harm outweighs any potential for benefit.

Tentative evidence suggests that monoamine oxidase inhibitors (MAOIs) such as pirlindole and moclobemide are moderately effective for reducing pain. Very low-quality evidence suggests pirlindole as more effective at treating pain than moclobemide. Side effects of MAOIs may include nausea and vomiting.

For sleep quality, there is no good evidence showing that amitriptyline, milnacipran or duloxetine give improvement.

==== Anti-seizure medication ====
The anti-convulsant medications gabapentin and pregabalin may be used to reduce pain. There is tentative evidence that gabapentin may be of benefit for pain in about 18% of people with fibromyalgia. It is not possible to predict who will benefit, and a short trial may be recommended to test the effectiveness of this type of medication. Approximately 6/10 people who take gabapentin to treat pain related to fibromyalgia experience unpleasant side effects such as dizziness, abnormal walking, or swelling from fluid accumulation. Pregabalin demonstrates a benefit in about 9% of people, it may also enhance sleep quality. Pregabalin reduced time off work by 0.2 days per week. A 2025 review found that, for enhancing sleep quality in FM, pregabalin might be beneficial but had potential risks.

==== Opioids ====
The use of opioids is controversial. As of 2015, no opioid is approved for use in this condition by the FDA. A 2016 Cochrane review concluded that there is no good evidence to support or refute the suggestion that oxycodone, alone or in combination with naloxone, reduces pain in fibromyalgia. The National Institute of Arthritis and Musculoskeletal and Skin Diseases (NIAMS) in 2014 stated that there was a lack of evidence for opioids for most people. The Association of the Scientific Medical Societies in Germany in 2012 made no recommendation either for or against the use of weak opioids because of the limited amount of scientific research addressing their use in the treatment of fibromyalgia. They strongly advise against using strong opioids. The Canadian Pain Society in 2012 said that opioids, starting with a weak opioid like tramadol, can be tried but only for people with moderate to severe pain that is not well-controlled by non-opioid painkillers. They discourage the use of strong opioids and only recommend using them while they continue to provide improved pain and functioning. Healthcare providers should monitor people on opioids for ongoing effectiveness, side effects, and possible unwanted drug behaviors.

A 2015 review found fair evidence to support tramadol use if other medications do not work. A 2018 review found little evidence to support the combination of paracetamol (acetaminophen) and tramadol over a single medication. Goldenberg et al suggest that tramadol works via its serotonin and norepinephrine reuptake inhibition, rather than via its action as a weak opioid receptor agonist.

A large study of US people with fibromyalgia found that between 2005 and 2007 37.4% were prescribed short-acting opioids and 8.3% were prescribed long-acting opioids, with around 10% of those prescribed short-acting opioids using tramadol; and a 2011 Canadian study of 457 people with fibromyalgia found 32% used opioids and two-thirds of those used strong opioids.

==== Muscle relaxants ====
In August 2025 the FDA approved cyclobenzaprine hydrochloride (produced under the brand name 'Tonmya') for use in fibromyalgia. Some trials had shown significant pain reduction although uncertainty remained on real world efficacy and scale of impact.

The muscle relaxants cyclobenzaprine, carisoprodol with acetaminophen and caffeine, and tizanidine are sometimes used to treat fibromyalgia; however, as of 2015 they were not approved for this use in the United States.

==== Other medications ====
Melatonin has shown potential therapeutic value in managing fibromyalgia symptoms, including improvements in pain, sleep, anxiety levels, and quality of life. Melatonin is considered to be generally safe, hence it may be a promising supplementary treatment for fibromyalgia.

Central nervous system depressants include drug categories such as sedatives, tranquilizers, and hypnotics. A 2021 meta-analysis concluded that such drugs can improve the quality of life for fibromyalgia patients in the medium term.

Very low-quality evidence suggests quetiapine may be effective in fibromyalgia.

Capsaicin has been suggested as a topical pain reliever. Preliminary results suggest that it may improve sleep quality and fatigue, but there are not enough studies to support this claim.

Cannabinoids may have some benefits for people with fibromyalgia. However, as of 2022, the data on the topic was still limited. Cannabinoids may also have adverse effects and may negatively interact with common rheumatological drugs. No high-quality evidence exists that suggests synthetic THC (nabilone) helps with fibromyalgia.

Sodium oxybate increases growth hormone production levels through increased slow-wave sleep patterns. However, this medication was not approved by the FDA for the indication for use in people with fibromyalgia due to the concern for abuse.

Nonsteroidal anti-inflammatory drugs are not recommended for use as first-line therapy, and are not considered as useful in the management of fibromyalgia.

==== Combinations of medications ====
A 2018 research review (16 studies included) found there was very little evidence to support or refute that combinations of medications were more effective than single medications for reducing fibromyalgia pain.

=== Nutrition and dietary supplements ===
Reviews in 2023 and 2020 found only limited or no evidence existed to recommend any specific diet to people with FM.

Studies indicate that weight management is helpful for reducing FM impact.

Nutrition is related to fibromyalgia in several ways. Some nutritional risk factors for fibromyalgia complications are obesity, nutritional deficiencies, food allergies, and consuming food additives. The consumption of fruits and vegetables, low-processed foods, high-quality proteins, and healthy fats may have some benefits. Low-quality evidence found some benefits of a vegetarian or vegan diet.

Although dietary supplements have been widely investigated concerning fibromyalgia, most of the evidence, as of 2021, is of poor quality. It is therefore difficult to reach conclusive recommendations. It appears that Q10 coenzyme and vitamin D supplements can reduce pain and improve quality of life for fibromyalgia patients. Q10 coenzyme has beneficial effects on fatigue in fibromyalgia patients, with most studies using doses of 300 mg per day for three months. Q10 coenzyme is hypothesized to improve mitochondrial activity and decrease inflammation. Vitamin D has been shown to improve some fibromyalgia measures, but not others.

=== Physical therapy ===
Patients with chronic pain, including those with fibromyalgia, can benefit from techniques such as manual therapy, cryotherapy, and balneotherapy. These can lessen the experience of chronic pain and increase both the amount and quality of sleep. Patients' quality of life is also improved by decreasing pain mechanisms and increasing sleep quality, particularly during the REM phase, sleep efficiency, and alertness.

A 2021 meta-analysis concluded that massage and myofascial release diminish pain in the medium term. As of 2015, there was no good evidence for the benefit of other mind-body therapies.

A 2013 review found moderate-level evidence on the usage of acupuncture with electrical stimulation for improvement of overall well-being. Acupuncture alone will not have the same effects, but will enhance the influence of exercise and medication in pain and stiffness.

=== Electrical neuromodulation ===
Several forms of electrical neuromodulation, including transcutaneous electrical nerve stimulation (TENS) and transcranial direct current stimulation (tDCS), have been used to treat fibromyalgia. In general, they help reduce pain and depression and improve functioning.

Transcutaneous electrical nerve stimulation (TENS) is the delivery of pulsed electrical currents to the skin to stimulate peripheral nerves. TENS is widely used to treat pain and is considered to be a low-cost, safe, and self-administered treatment. As such, it is commonly recommended by clinicians to people suffering from pain. In 2019, an overview of eight Cochrane reviews was conducted, covering 51 TENS-related randomized controlled trials. The review concluded that the quality of the available evidence was insufficient to make any recommendations. A 2020 review concluded that transcutaneous electrical nerve stimulation may diminish pain in the short term, but there was uncertainty about the relevance of the results.

Preliminary findings suggest that electrically stimulating the vagus nerve through an implanted device can potentially reduce fibromyalgia symptoms. However, there may be adverse reactions to the procedure.

Noninvasive brain stimulation includes methods such as transcranial direct current stimulation and high-frequency repetitive transcranial magnetic stimulation (TMS). Both methods have been found to improve pain scores in neuropathic pain and fibromyalgia. A 2023 meta-analysis of 16 RCTs found that transcranial direct current stimulation (tDCS) of over 4 weeks can decrease pain in patients with fibromyalgia. A 2021 meta-analysis of multiple intervention types concluded that magnetic field therapy and transcranial magnetic stimulation may diminish pain in the short-term, but conveyed an uncertainty about the relevance of the result. Several 2022 meta-analyses focusing on transcranial magnetic stimulation found positive effects on fibromyalgia. Repetitive transcranial magnetic stimulation improved pain in the short-term and quality of life after 5–12 weeks. Repetitive transcranial magnetic stimulation did not improve anxiety, depression, and fatigue. Transcranial magnetic stimulation to the left dorsolateral prefrontal cortex was also ineffective.

A systematic review of EEG neurofeedback for the treatment of fibromyalgia found most treatments showed significant improvements of the main symptoms of the disease. However, the protocols were so different, and the lack of controls or randomization impede drawing conclusive results.

=== Other interventions ===
A 2024 review found that fecal microbiota transplantation may reduce pain intensity and improve fatigue and quality of life in patients with fibromyalgia, but evidence was insufficient at that stage to support use. Research on gut microbiome links with FM continues.

Hyperbaric oxygen therapy (HBOT) has shown beneficial effects in treating chronic pain by reducing inflammation and oxidative stress. However, treating fibromyalgia with hyperbaric oxygen therapy is still controversial, in light of the scarcity of large-scale clinical trials. In addition, hyperbaric oxygen therapy raises safety concerns due to the oxidative damage that may follow it.

== Prognosis ==
Symptoms of fibromyalgia are regarded as persistent in nearly all patients. The German Federal Ministry of Health guidance on FM refers to a longitudinal study (n = 1555) in which 10% of patients had substantial improvement in pain, 15% had moderate improvement, and 39% worsened. FM severity worsened in 36%. No average meaningful change in symptoms was found, and high levels of self-reported symptoms and distress continued for most patients.

Fibromyalgia can cause substantial disability, with impacts on the ability to work, engage in recreational activities, and do household duties. Amongst people with fibromyalgia, the proportion that are able to maintain their jobs has been estimated at between 34% and 77%, and some research suggest the typical reduction in work hours is between 50-70%. There is variation in the level of impact, with 71.4% of those who are mild remaining in employment, compared to 61.2% of those who are moderate and 28.5% of those who are severe. Levels of pain can vary significantly over time, from severe pain to almost symptom-free phases.

A 2023 meta-analysis found that FM people were at a standardized mortality ratio (i.e., observed mortality rates in the study population, compared to expected levels based on a standard population) of 3.37 (95% CI 1.52 to 7.50) for mortality due to suicide. (Note: Thus, the observed number of suicides in the fibromyalgia study group was 3.37 times higher than the expected number. However, people with fibromyalgia often have multiple health conditions; this approach attributes the higher suicide rate to fibromyalgia alone and may overstate its impact.) A 2021 review found that people with FM had suicide ideation OR 9.12, suicide attempt OR 3.12, suicide risk OR 36.77 and suicide events HR 1.38, but commented that FM impact could not be separated from the effects of comorbidities and sleep deprivation. A 2020 review found that FM was associated with significantly higher risks for suicidal ideations, suicide attempts and death by suicide compared to the general population.

A meta-analysis found that FM people were at a standardized mortality ratio of 1.95 (95% CI 0.97 to 3.92) due to accidents, and 1.66 (95% CI 1.15 to 2.38) due to infections. SMR due to cancer was a decreased rate of 0.82 (95% CI 0.69 to 0.97), perhaps because greater interaction with the health systems of people with FM leads to earlier cancer detection. The studies showed significant heterogeneity.

A 2020 review found that many of the core clinical symptoms of FM were more strongly associated with suicidal ideation than with suicidal behaviours.

An evaluation of nine trials with 288 patients in total found that HBOT was more effective at relieving fibromyalgia patients' pain than the control intervention. In most of the trials, HBOT improved sleep disturbance, multidimensional function, patient satisfaction, and tender spots. Negative outcomes (predominantly mild barotrauma (air pressure effect on ear or lung) that could be resolved spontaneously) were experienced by 24% of the patients, but they were not prevented from completing the treatment regimen, and no serious side effects, complications, or deaths were reported.

== Epidemiology ==
Fibromyalgia is estimated to affect 1.8% of the population. German Federal Ministry of Health guidance is that about 2% of adults in Germany suffer from fibromyalgia. Information about FM prevalence in many parts of the world is limited by lack of information and by differing diagnosis standards. A 2024 study found more patients met fibromyalgia proxy criteria than were clinically diagnosed with fibromyalgia, implying that fibromyalgia is underdiagnosed.

Historically, diagnosed FM cases have been between 4%-20% male. As a result historically most FM research has focused on women. There has been debate about whether men experience differences in FM symptoms compared to women. Men may be relatively underdiagnosed, perhaps because they interact with medical services over chronic pain less than women do. The genetic architecture of fibromyalgia is nearly identical between males and females.

== Society and culture ==
Fibromyalgia causes substantial economic and societal strain due to disability, reduced work hours, informal care, early retirement, and healthcare utilization. According to a 2014 review indirect costs, such as those due to disability and lost productivity, accounted for most of the costs, and the cost to society amounted to "tens of thousands of dollars each year" per patient. A 2022 review of 36 studies found that fibromyalgia causes a significant economic strain on healthcare systems. Annual costs per patient were estimated to be $1,750 to $35,920 in the US, and $1,250 to $8,504 in Europe.

People with fibromyalgia can be subjected to significant stigma in society generally, and within the medical system. They may face disbelief in the legitimacy of their pain, moralizing attitudes, and suspicions of malingering, which relate to the invisible nature of the pain and prejudices relating to the historic predominance of women amongst people with the condition. Health professionals may hold negative attitudes towards patients with fibromyalgia, considering them "demanding" or their symptoms to be exaggerated or fake, and they may lack knowledge about the condition, which can also contribute to delays in diagnosis. Many people with fibromyalgia feel that healthcare providers believe they are faking or exaggerating. This stigma can have a considerable impact on the social interactions, trust in healthcare, and mental health of people with fibromyalgia.

Men have experienced difficulties in accepting and communicating about FM, as it was sometimes seen as a "woman's disease" and could thus impact their self-image.

Well-known people who have had FM include Lady Gaga, Sinead O'Connor, Mary McDonough, Janeane Garofalo, Rosie Hamlin, Kirsty Young, Lena Dunham, and Morgan Freeman. Cricketer Don Bradman was diagnosed with fibrositis, an early term for fibromyalgia.

== History ==
=== Origins ===
Chronic widespread pain had been described in the literature in the 19th century. Fibromyalgia was first recognized in the 1950s.

Many names, including muscular rheumatism, fibrositis, psychogenic rheumatism, and neurasthenia had been applied historically to symptoms resembling those of fibromyalgia. The term fibromyalgia was first used in 1976, when Phillip Kahler Hench used it to describe widespread pain symptoms, and it was used by researcher Mohammed Yunus in a scientific publication in 1981.

A 1977 paper on fibrositis by Smythe and Moldofsky was important in the development of the fibromyalgia concept. The first clinical, controlled study of the characteristics of fibromyalgia syndrome was published in 1981, providing support for symptom associations. In 1984, an interconnection between fibromyalgia syndrome and other similar conditions was proposed, and in 1986, trials of the first proposed medications for fibromyalgia were published.

A 1987 article in the Journal of the American Medical Association used the term 'fibromyalgia syndrome', while saying it was a "controversial condition". The American College of Rheumatology (ACR) published its first classification criteria for fibromyalgia in 1990. Later revisions were made in 2010, 2016, and 2019.

=== Controversies on the nature and reality of fibromyalgia ===
In the past, fibromyalgia was a disputed diagnosis. Rheumatologist Frederick Wolfe, lead author of the 1990 paper that first defined the diagnostic guidelines for fibromyalgia, stated in 2008 that he believed it "clearly" was not a disease but instead a physical response to depression and stress. In 2013, Wolfe added that its causes "are controversial in a sense" and "there are many factors that produce these symptoms – some are psychological and some are physical and it does exist on a continuum." Some members of the medical community did not consider fibromyalgia a disease because of a lack of abnormalities on physical examination and the absence of objective diagnostic tests.

In the past, some psychiatrists viewed fibromyalgia as a type of affective disorder, or a somatic symptom disorder. These controversies did not engage healthcare specialists alone; some patients objected to fibromyalgia being described in purely somatic terms.

As of 2022, neurologists and pain specialists tended to view fibromyalgia as a real pathology. It was mostly seen as due to dysfunction of muscles and connective tissue as well as functional abnormalities in the central nervous system. Rheumatologists defined the syndrome in the context of "central sensitization" – heightened brain response to normal stimuli in the absence of disorders of the muscles, joints, or connective tissues. Because of this symptomatic overlap, some researchers proposed that fibromyalgia and other analogous syndromes be classified together as central sensitivity syndromes.

=== History of fibromyalgia diagnosis ===
The 18 tender points used in the 1990 ACR diagnostic criteria for fibromyalgia

The first widely accepted set of classification criteria for research purposes was elaborated in 1990 by the Multicenter Criteria Committee of the American College of Rheumatology. These criteria, which are known informally as "the ACR 1990", defined fibromyalgia according to the presence of the following criteria:

- A history of widespread pain lasting more than three months – affecting all four quadrants of the body, i.e., both sides and above and below the waist.
- Tender points – there are 18 designated possible tender points (although a person with the disorder may feel pain in other areas as well).

The ACR criteria for the classification of patients were originally established as inclusion criteria for research purposes and were not intended for clinical diagnosis, but have later become the de facto diagnostic criteria in the clinical setting. A controversial study was done by a legal team looking to prove their client's disability based primarily on tender points, and their widespread presence in non-litigious communities prompted the lead author of the ACR criteria to question the usefulness of tender points in diagnosis. Use of control points has been used to cast doubt on whether a person has fibromyalgia, and to claim the person is malingering.

In 2010, the American College of Rheumatology approved provisional revised diagnostic criteria for fibromyalgia that eliminated the 1990 criteria's reliance on tender point testing. The revised criteria used a widespread pain index (WPI) and symptom severity scale (SSS) in place of tender point testing under the 1990 criteria. The WPI counts up to 19 general body areas (Note: Shoulder girdle (left & right), upper arm (left & right), lower arm (left & right), hip/buttock/trochanter (left & right), upper leg (left & right), lower leg (left & right), jaw (left & right), chest, abdomen, back (upper & lower), and neck.) in which the person has experienced pain in the preceding week. The SSS rates the severity of the person's fatigue, unrefreshed waking, cognitive symptoms, and general somatic symptoms, (Note: Somatic symptoms include, but are not limited to muscle pain, irritable bowel syndrome, fatigue or tiredness, problems thinking or remembering, muscle weakness, headache, pain or cramps in the abdomen, numbness or tingling, dizziness, insomnia, depression, constipation, pain in the upper abdomen, nausea, nervousness, chest pain, blurred vision, fever, diarrhea, dry mouth, itching, wheezing, Raynaud's phenomenon, hives or welts, ringing in the ears, vomiting, heartburn, oral ulcers, loss of or changes in taste, seizures, dry eyes, shortness of breath, loss of appetite, rash, sun sensitivity, hearing difficulties, easy bruising, hair loss, frequent or painful urination, and bladder spasms.) each on a scale from 0 to 3, for a composite score ranging from 0 to 12. The revised criteria for diagnosis were:

- WPI ≥ 7 and SSS ≥ 5 OR WPI 3–6 and SSS ≥ 9,
- Symptoms have been present at a similar level for at least three months, and
- No other diagnosable disorder otherwise explains the pain.
