= 2-Oxoquazepam =

Chemical compound

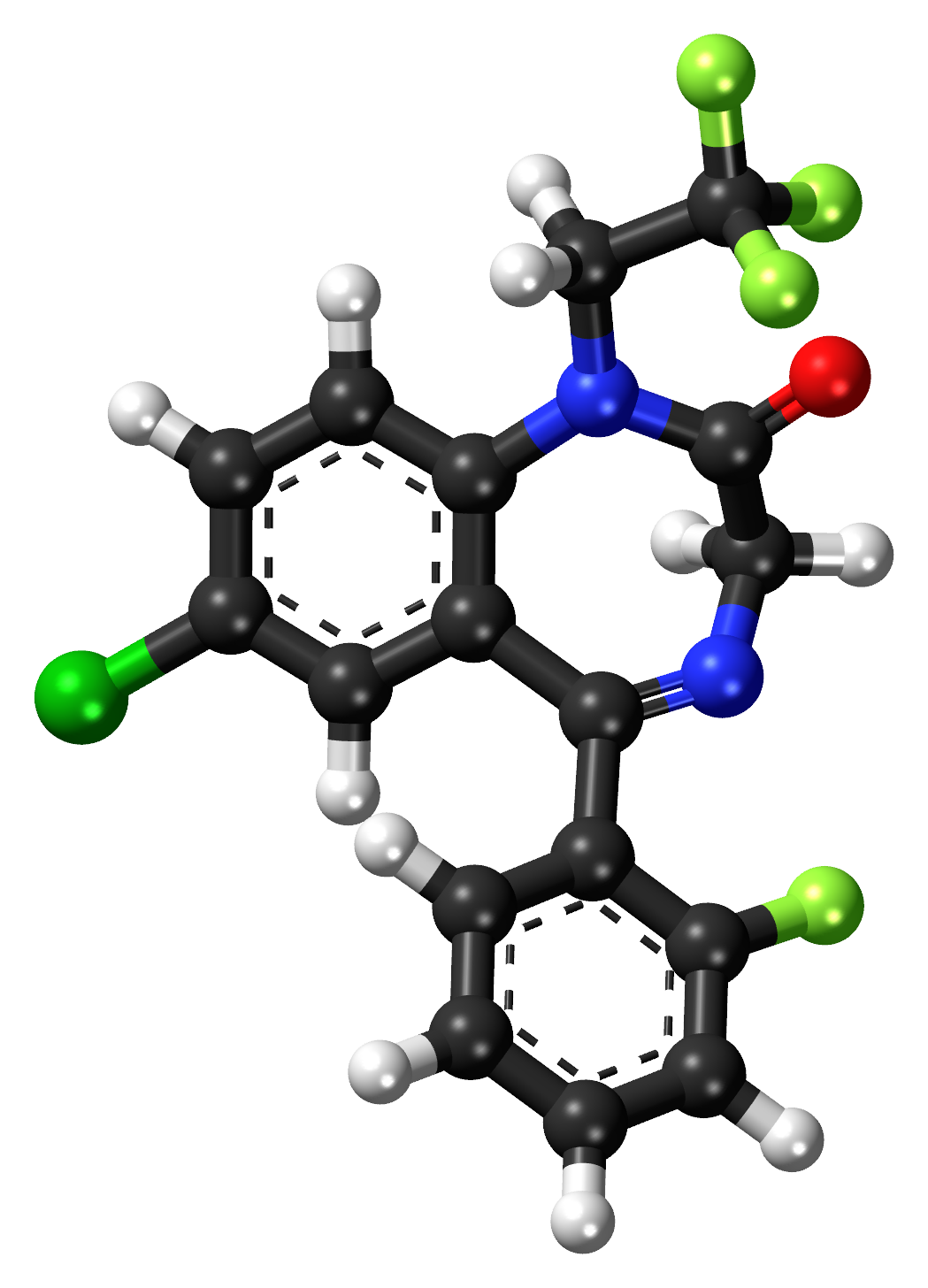

Identifiers
- IUPAC name: 7-Chloro-5-(2-fluorophenyl)-1-(2,2,2-trifluoroethyl)-3H-1,4-benzodiazepin-2-one
- CAS Number: 49606-44-2
- PubChem CID: 93250
- ChemSpider: 84187
- UNII: 8T62S796K7
- CompTox Dashboard (EPA): DTXSID30197932
- ECHA InfoCard: 100.051.252

Chemical and physical data
- Formula: C_{17}H_{11}ClF_{4}N_{2}O
- Molar mass: 370.73 g·mol^{−1}
- 3D model (JSmol): Interactive image
- SMILES: C1C(=O)N(C2=C(C=C(C=C2)Cl)C(=N1)C3=CC=CC=C3F)CC(F)(F)F
- InChI: InChI=1S/C17H11ClF4N2O/c18-10-5-6-14-12(7-10)16(11-3-1-2-4-13(11)19)23-8-15(25)24(14)9-17(20,21)22/h1-7H,8-9H2; Key:YFSXBSRGIRSXAD-UHFFFAOYSA-N

2-Oxoquazepam (Sch 15725) is a benzodiazepine derivative and one of the major active metabolites of quazepam (Doral). It is the 2-fluoro analog of halazepam.
