= Supersensitivity =

Supersensitivity may refer to:

- Denervation supersensitivity
- Supersensitivity psychosis
- Disuse supersensitivity
- Hyperesthesia, abnormal increase in sensitivity to stimuli of the sense
  - Supertaster

== See also ==
- Hypersensitivity
