= Flutazolam =

Benzodiazepine

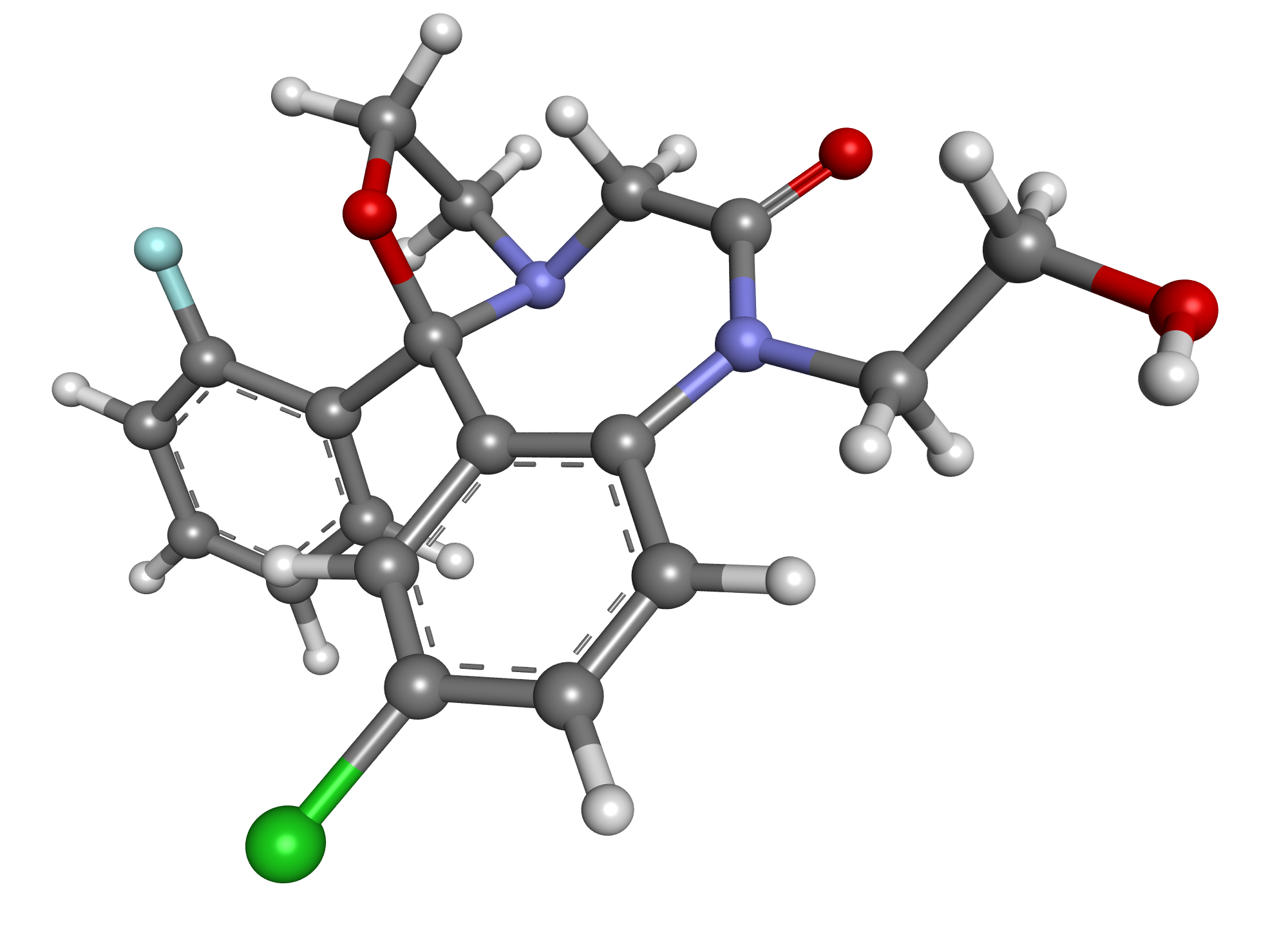

Clinical data
- Trade names: Coreminal (JP)
- Other names: 13-chloro- 2-(2-fluorophenyl)- 9-(2-hydroxyethyl)- 3-oxa- 6,9-diazatricyclo[8.4.0.0^{2,6}] tetradeca-1(10),11,13- trien- 8-one
- AHFS/Drugs.com: International Drug Names
- Routes of administration: Oral

Legal status
- Legal status: US: Unscheduled; In general: unscheduled, Rx-only in Japan

Pharmacokinetic data
- Metabolism: Hepatic
- Elimination half-life: 3.5 hours (parent compound); 47-100 hours (major metabolite)

Identifiers
- IUPAC name: 10-chloro-11b-(2-fluorophenyl)-7-(2-hydroxyethyl)-3,5-dihydro-2H-[1,3]oxazolo[3,2-d][1,4]benzodiazepin-6-one
- CAS Number: 27060-91-9
- PubChem CID: 3398
- ChemSpider: 3281
- UNII: 5G2K7O5D8S
- KEGG: D01286
- ChEMBL: ChEMBL1697836
- CompTox Dashboard (EPA): DTXSID6023072

Chemical and physical data
- Formula: C_{19}H_{18}ClFN_{2}O_{3}
- Molar mass: 376.81 g·mol^{−1}
- 3D model (JSmol): Interactive image
- SMILES: Fc1ccccc1C42OCCN2CC(=O)N(c3c4cc(Cl)cc3)CCO
- InChI: InChI=1S/C19H18ClFN2O3/c20-13-5-6-17-15(11-13)19(14-3-1-2-4-16(14)21)22(8-10-26-19)12-18(25)23(17)7-9-24/h1-6,11,24H,7-10,12H2; Key:WMFSSTNVXWNLKI-UHFFFAOYSA-N

Flutazolam (Coreminal, MS-4101) is a central nervous system depressant and sedative drug. Derived from the benzodiazepine structure, it was invented and approved for medical use in Japan.

Flutazolam exhibits sedative, muscle relaxant, anticonvulsant, and anxiolytic effects similar to those produced by other benzodiazepine derivatives, and though it is around the same potency as diazepam, it produces a more marked sedation and impaired coordination. It is indicated for the treatment of insomnia. Its major active metabolite is n-desalkylflurazepam, also known as norflurazepam, which is also a principal metabolite of flurazepam (trade name Dalmane). While flutazolam has a very short half-life of only 3.5 hours, n-desalkylflurazepam has a long half-life of between 47–100 hours.

Flutazolam is closely related in structure to another benzodiazepine, haloxazolam.

== See also ==
- Flurazepam (Dalmane, Slipam) and *N-desalkylflurazepam, primary metabolite
- Mexazolam (Melex, Sedoxil)
