= Flutoprazepam =

Benzodiazepine

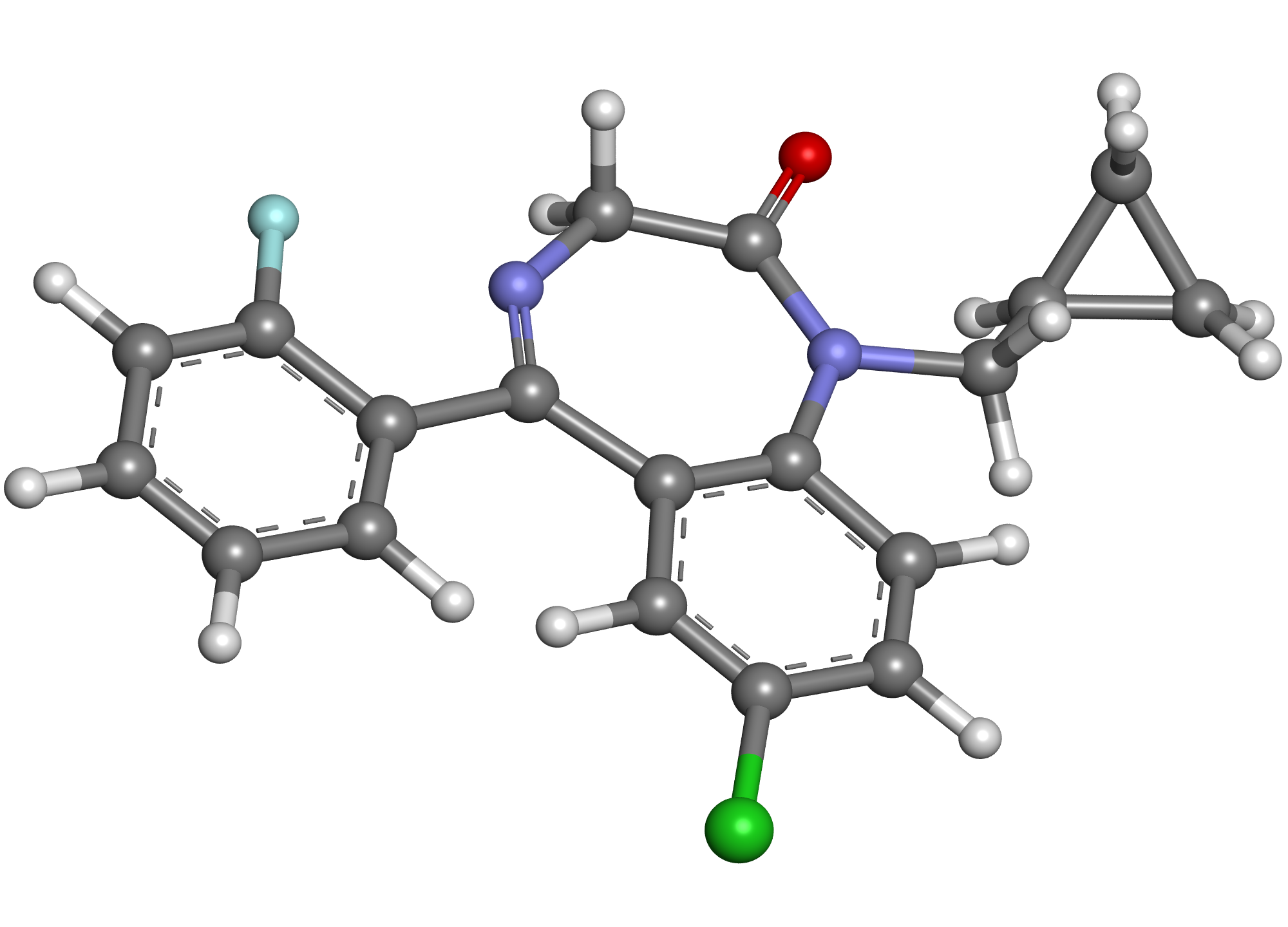

Clinical data
- Trade names: Restas
- AHFS/Drugs.com: International Drug Names
- Routes of administration: Oral, Intravenous
- ATC code: none

Legal status
- Legal status: CA: Schedule IV; DE: NpSG (Industrial and scientific use only); UK: Under Psychoactive Substances Act; US: Unscheduled

Pharmacokinetic data
- Bioavailability: 80-90%
- Metabolism: Hepatic
- Elimination half-life: 60-90 hours
- Excretion: Renal

Identifiers
- IUPAC name: 7-chloro-1-(cyclopropylmethyl)-5-(2-fluorophenyl)-3H-1,4-benzodiazepin-2-one
- CAS Number: 25967-29-7
- PubChem CID: 3400
- ChemSpider: 3283
- UNII: 2GHY1101MM
- KEGG: D01279
- ChEMBL: ChEMBL2106743
- CompTox Dashboard (EPA): DTXSID20180631

Chemical and physical data
- Formula: C_{19}H_{16}ClFN_{2}O
- Molar mass: 342.80 g·mol^{−1}
- 3D model (JSmol): Interactive image
- SMILES: FC1=CC=CC=C1C2=NCC(N(CC3CC3)C4=C2C=C(C=C4)Cl)=O
- InChI: InChI=1S/C19H16ClFN2O/c20-13-7-8-17-15(9-13)19(14-3-1-2-4-16(14)21)22-10-18(24)23(17)11-12-5-6-12/h1-4,7-9,12H,5-6,10-11H2; Key:OFVXPDXXVSGEPX-UHFFFAOYSA-N

Flutoprazepam (Restas) is a drug which is a benzodiazepine. It was patented in Japan by Sumitomo in 1972 and its medical use remains mostly confined to that country. Its muscle relaxant properties are approximately equivalent to those of diazepam - however, it has more powerful sedative, hypnotic, anxiolytic and anticonvulsant effects and is around four times more potent by weight compared to diazepam. It is longer acting than diazepam due to its long-acting active metabolites, which contribute significantly to its effects. Its principal active metabolite is n-desalkylflurazepam, also known as norflurazepam, which is also a principal metabolite of flurazepam (trade name Dalmadorm/Dalmane).

Flutoprazepam is typically used for the treatment of severe insomnia and may also be used for treating stomach ulcers.

Flutoprazepam does not fall under the international Convention on Psychotropic Substances of 1971, and is currently unscheduled in the United States.

- In Singapore, flutoprazepam is a Class C-Schedule II drug under the Misuse of Drugs Act.
- In Thailand, flutoprazepam is a Schedule III psychotropic substance.
- In Hong Kong, flutoprazepam is regulated under Schedule 1 of Hong Kong's Chapter 134 Dangerous Drugs Ordinance. Flutoprazepam can only be used legally by health professionals and for university research purposes. The substance can be given by pharmacists under a prescription. Anyone who supplies the substance without prescription can be fined $10000 (HKD). The penalty for trafficking or manufacturing the substance is a $5,000,000 (HKD) fine and life imprisonment. Possession of the substance for consumption without license from the Department of Health is illegal with a $1,000,000 (HKD) fine and/or 7 years of jail time.

== See also ==
- Benzodiazepine
- Flurazepam
- N-desalkylflurazepam
