= Tardive psychosis =

Tardive psychosis is a hypothetical form of psychosis caused by long-term use of neuroleptics. It was first proposed in 1978 but was questioned by the late 1980s. It was hypothesized that psychosis could arise as neuroleptic medication become decreasingly effective, requiring higher doses, or when not responding to higher doses.

Evaluation suggests that "tardive psychosis" is better described as a combination of "several different and not necessarily correlated phenomena related to neuroleptic treatment of schizophrenia."

Some articles equated tardive psychosis to supersensitivity psychosis. However, descriptions of symptoms of the latter do not match the former. Specific supersensitivity psychosis articles focus on psychotic episodes in the wake of psychotic medication withdrawal associated with Clozapine, rather than on medication resistance. A hypothetical condition related to tardive psychosis, tardive dysmentia, has also been questioned.

== Description ==
The theoretical tardive psychosis is distinct from schizophrenia and induced by the use of current (dopaminergic) antipsychotics by the depletion of dopamine and related to the known side effect caused by their long-term use, tardive dyskinesia.

In addition to dopaminergic upregulation in the nigrostriatal tracts, many investigators have suggested that dopaminergic upregulation may occur in mesolimbic or mesocortical tracts, leading to a worsening of psychosis beyond the original level. This phenomenon has been called 'tardive psychosis' or 'supersensitivity psychosis'.

Tardive psychosis was researched in 1978 and 1989, and sporadic research continues. Some studies have found it to be associated with psychotic depression and potentially, dissociation. For people with any tardive conditions clozapine remains an option but since it can create blood dyscrasias, which require frequent blood work, as well as other severe side effects, it is used increasingly less in clinical practice. Although tardive psychosis continues to be studied, it still has not been established as a fact but it is known that the study classes of antipsychotics such as the NMDA receptor modulators (glutamate antagonists) in not creating tardive dyskinesia will not create this condition.

== See also ==
- Supersensitivity psychosis
- Tardive dyskinesia
- Tardive dysmentia
