= Rebound effect =

Pharmacological term

The rebound effect, also known as the rebound phenomenon, refers to the re-emergence of symptoms that were previously absent or controlled while on medication, which occur when the medication is discontinued or the dosage is reduced. In cases of re-emergence, the symptoms are often more severe than they were before treatment.

== Examples ==
=== Alpha-2 adrenergic agents ===
Rebound hypertension, above pre-treatment level, was observed after clonidine and guanfacine discontinuation.

Continuous usage of topical decongestants (nasal sprays) can lead to constant nasal congestion, known as rhinitis medicamentosa.

=== Antidepressants ===
Many antidepressants, including SSRIs, can cause rebound depression, panic attacks, anxiety, and insomnia when discontinued.

=== Antihistamines ===
Many antihistamines, both first and second, can cause rebound pruritus, urticaria, allergic symptoms, and insomnia when discontinued. Examples of these medications include cetirizine, levocetirizine, and diphenhydramine.

=== Antipsychotics ===
Sudden and severe emergence or re-emergence of psychosis may appear when antipsychotics are switched or discontinued too rapidly.

=== Humanized antibodies ===
Denosumab inhibits osteoclast recycling, which results in the accumulation of pre-osteoclasts and osteomorphs. When denosumab therapy is discontinued, the induced cells quite quickly and abundantly differentiate into osteoclasts causing bone resorption (rebound effect) and increasing the risk of fractures. For improving mineral bone density and preventing fractures after denosumab discontinuation, bisphosphonate administration is recommended.

=== Sedative–hypnotics ===
Rebound insomnia is insomnia that occurs following discontinuation of sedative-hypnotic substances taken to relieve primary insomnia. Regular use of these substances can cause a person to become dependent on their effects in order to fall asleep. Therefore, when a person has stopped taking the medication and is 'rebounding' from its effects, they may experience insomnia as a symptom of withdrawal. Occasionally, this insomnia may be worse than the insomnia the drug was intended to treat. Common medications reported in this context include eszopiclone, zolpidem, and benzodiazepine anxiolytics; alprazolam has specifically been associated with rebound anxiety after discontinuation.

Rebound depression may appear to arise in patients previously free of such an illness.

Daytime rebound effects of anxiety, metallic taste, perceptual disturbances which are typical benzodiazepine withdrawal symptoms can occur the next day after a short-acting benzodiazepine hypnotic wears off. Rebound phenomena do not necessarily only occur on discontinuation of a prescribed dosage. Another example is early morning rebound insomnia which may occur when a rapidly eliminated hypnotic wears off which leads to rebounding awakeness forcing the person to become wide awake before he or she has had a full night's sleep. One drug which seems to be commonly associated with these problems is triazolam, due to its high potency and ultra short half-life, but these effects can occur with other short-acting hypnotic drugs. Quazepam, due to its selectivity for type1 benzodiazepine receptors and long half-life, does not cause daytime anxiety rebound effects during treatment, showing that half-life is very important for determining whether a nighttime hypnotic will cause next-day rebound withdrawal effects or not. Daytime rebound effects are not necessarily mild but can sometimes produce quite marked psychiatric and psychological disturbances.

=== Stimulants ===
Rebound effects from stimulants such as methylphenidate or dextroamphetamine include stimulant psychosis, depression and a return of ADHD symptoms but in a temporarily exaggerated form. Up to a third of ADHD children experience a rebound effect when methylphenidate is withdrawn.

=== Other medications ===
Another example of pharmaceutical rebound is a rebound headache from painkillers when the dose is lowered, the medication wears off, or the drug is abruptly discontinued.

In 2022, reports of viral RNA and symptom rebound in people with COVID-19 treated with Paxlovid were published. In May, CDC even issued a health alert informing physicians about "Paxlovid rebounds", which received attention when US president Joe Biden experienced a rebound. The cause of the rebound is unclear however, since around a third of people with COVID-19 experience a symptom rebound regardless of treatment.

Abrupt withdrawal of highly potent corticosteroids, such as clobetasol for psoriasis, can cause a much more severe case of the psoriasis to develop. Therefore, withdrawal should be gradual, until very little actual medication is being applied.

== See also ==
- Disuse supersensitivity
- Dopamine supersensitivity psychosis
- Physical dependence
- Rebound headache
- Drug withdrawal
- Unintended consequences
