= Fletazepam =

Chemical compound

Clinical data
- ATC code: none

Identifiers
- IUPAC name: 7-chloro-5-(2-fluorophenyl)-1-(2,2,2-trifluoroethyl)-2,3-dihydro-1,4-benzodiazepine
- CAS Number: 34482-99-0
- PubChem CID: 36834
- ChemSpider: 33806
- UNII: 3AH8OSQ79O
- KEGG: D04191
- CompTox Dashboard (EPA): DTXSID10188040
- ECHA InfoCard: 100.047.309

Chemical and physical data
- Formula: C_{17}H_{13}ClF_{4}N_{2}
- Molar mass: 356.75 g·mol^{−1}
- 3D model (JSmol): Interactive image
- SMILES: FC1=CC=CC=C1C2=NCCN(CC(F)(F)F)C3=C2C=C(Cl)C=C3
- InChI: InChI=1S/C17H13ClF4N2/c18-11-5-6-15-13(9-11)16(12-3-1-2-4-14(12)19)23-7-8-24(15)10-17(20,21)22/h1-6,9H,7-8,10H2; Key:CIZCSUNUBQXVFP-UHFFFAOYSA-N

Fletazepam is a drug which is a benzodiazepine derivative. It has sedative and anxiolytic effects similar to those produced by other benzodiazepine derivatives, but is mainly notable for its strong muscle relaxant properties.

Fletazepam is most closely related to other N-trifluoroethyl substituted benzodiazepines such as halazepam and quazepam.

== See also ==
- Benzodiazepine
- Medazepam
