= Antipsychotic switching =

Process of transferring between antipsychotics

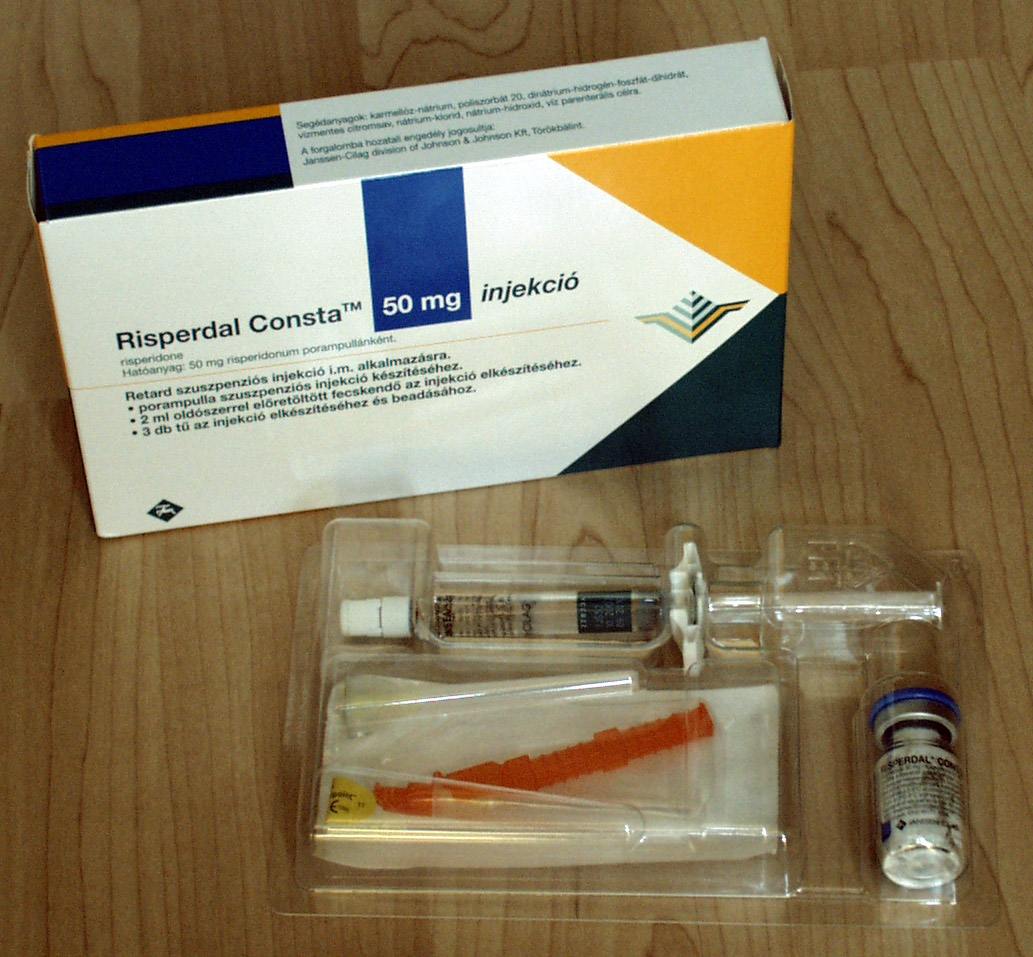
Risperdal Consta is a long-acting injectable antipsychotic, a type of antipsychotic that may be considered for antipsychotic switching if a patient is nonadherent to taking their antipsychotic medicine by mouth every day.

Antipsychotic switching refers to the process of switching out one antipsychotic for another antipsychotic. There are multiple indications for switching antipsychotics, including inadequate efficacy and drug intolerance. There are several strategies that have been theorized for antipsychotic switching, based upon the timing of discontinuation and tapering of the original antipsychotic and the timing of initiation and titration of the new antipsychotic. Major adverse effects from antipsychotic switching may include supersensitivity syndromes, withdrawal, and rebound syndromes.

== Rationale ==
Antipsychotics may be switched due to inadequate efficacy, drug intolerance, patient/guardian preference, drug regimen simplification, or for economic reasons.

1. Inadequate efficacy: An inadequate treatment response to an antipsychotic, assuming that the lack of efficacy is due to an otherwise adequately dosed regimen for an appropriate duration, can result from failure to achieve therapeutic goals in any major treatment domain. For example, this can refer to a patient who becomes acutely psychotic after being stable previously. Other failures include persistent symptoms of schizophrenia, either positive or negative, problems with mood (including suicidality), or problems with cognition. Inadequate efficacy may be due to nonadherence to therapy, which can influence treatment decisions. For example, long acting injectable (LAI) antipsychotics are often indicated in the setting of medication nonadherence.
2. Drug intolerance: Adverse effects can contribute to drug intolerance, potentially necessitating antipsychotic switching. Adverse effects that threaten serious harm, aggravate other medical conditions, or make a person want to stop taking their medications are all examples of drug intolerance. Certain drug interactions can cause adverse effects as well.
3. Patient/guardian preference: A patient or caregiver may prefer a different antipsychotic. This may be due to misinformation regarding the antipsychotic, including its side effects, a lack of insight into the importance of the medication and the severity of the disease, or overestimating the therapeutic effect.
4. Drug regimen simplification: Adherence to medication therapy is inversely related to the frequency of dosing. The antipsychotic quetiapine is typically dosed two to three times daily for the management of schizophrenia. A simpler regimen would be a once daily administered antipsychotic. For example, risperidone can be administered once daily. A lack of adherence can lead to poor health outcomes, as well as unnecessary financial burden.
5. Economics: A patient or caregiver may request antipsychotic switching to reduce medication costs. See below for a table of the direct costs of living with schizophrenia per patient across countries.

Cost of schizophrenia per patient by country
Country	Annual direct costs (in US dollars)
Belgium	12,050
People's Republic of China	700
South Korea	2,600
Taiwan	2,115 to 2,144
United Kingdom	3,420
United States	15,464

== Contraindications ==
In general, contraindications to antipsychotic switching are cases in which the risk of switching outweighs the potential benefit. Contraindications to antipsychotic switching include effective treatment of an acute psychotic episode, patients stable on a LAI antipsychotic with a history of poor adherence, and stable patients with a history of self-injurious behavior, violent behavior, or significant self-neglect or other symptoms.

== Strategies ==
There are multiple strategies available for switching antipsychotics. An abrupt switch involves abruptly switching from one antipsychotic to the other without any titration. A cross-taper is accomplished by gradually discontinuing the pre-switch antipsychotic while simultaneously up-titrating the new antipsychotic. An overlap and discontinuation switch involves maintaining the pre-switch antipsychotic until the new antipsychotic is gradually titrated up, then gradually titrating down on the pre-switch antipsychotic. Alternatively, in an ascending taper switch, the pre-switch antipsychotic can be abruptly discontinued. Another alternative, known as the descending taper switch, involves slowly discontinuing the pre-switch antipsychotic while abruptly starting the new antipsychotic. These switching strategies can be further subdivided by the inclusion or exclusion of a plateau period.

See the figure below for a graphic visualization of the five main antipsychotic switching strategies discussed above.

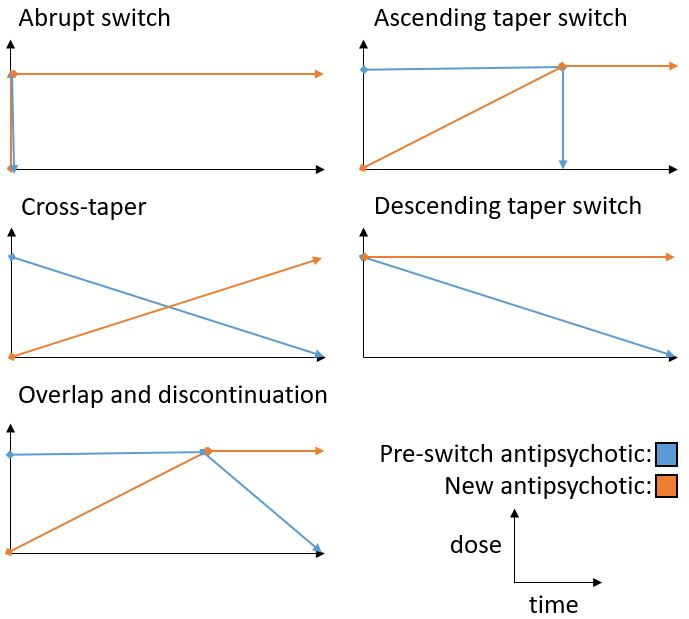

Due to differences in how individual antipsychotics work, even within each generation, the process of switching between antipsychotics has become more complex.

== Adverse effects ==
The three major adverse effects of antipsychotic switching are supersensitivity syndromes, withdrawal, and rebound syndromes.

=== Supersensitivity syndromes ===
Antipsychotics work by antagonizing the dopamine receptor D2 (D2R) in the mesolimbic pathway of the brain. When the D2R is suppressed, the neurons may become sensitized to the effect of an endogenous ligand (i.e. dopamine) by up-regulating the production of postsynaptic D2Rs. If the D2 receptors are not subsequently suppressed at previous levels after an abrupt discontinuation of an antipsychotic (e.g. after switching to weak D2R antagonists quetiapine or clozapine), a rebound/supersensitivity psychosis may occur due to the overwhelming effect of endogenous dopamine on sensitized neurons. Supersensitivity psychosis, also called rapid-onset psychosis, must be distinguished from a relapse or exacerbation of the underlying disease (e.g. schizophrenia). Dopamine supersensitivity psychosis generally occurs around 6 weeks after an oral antipsychotic is discontinued, or 3 months after a LAI antipsychotic is discontinued. In addition, supersensitivity psychosis is generally easier to reverse by reintroducing D2R antagonism (i.e. restarting the discontinued drug), whereas a relapsed schizophrenia is more difficult to control.

=== Rebound syndromes ===
The second-generation antipsychotic olanzapine is thought to have a rebound-induced hyperthermia, which may be mediated by serotonin receptors. Hyperthermia, or elevated core body temperature, is associated with neuroleptic malignant syndrome, a potentially lethal syndrome that commonly occurs due to excessive D2R antagonism. (Note: As a point of contrast, hypothermia, or low core body temperature, has most frequently occurred in the presence of olanzapine, risperidone, or haloperidol.)

In general, rebound D2R activity may induce rebound parkinsonism and rebound akathisia.

=== Withdrawal ===
D2 receptor activity withdrawal may induce withdrawal dyskinesia. This late-onset, hypersensitivity-type dyskinesia is in contrast to the early-onset dyskinesia that can occur due to an over-compensatory dopamine release associated with abrupt dopamine antagonist withdrawal. Other symptoms of dopamine withdrawal include difficulty sleeping, anxiety, and restlessness.

== Alternatives ==
An alternative to antipsychotic switching, in the setting of a person that is not responding to the initial dose of an antipsychotic, is to increase the dose of antipsychotic prescribed. A 2018 Cochrane review compared the evidence between the two strategies, but the authors were unable to draw any conclusions about whether either method was preferable due to limited evidence.
