= Halazepam =

Discontinued benzodiazepine

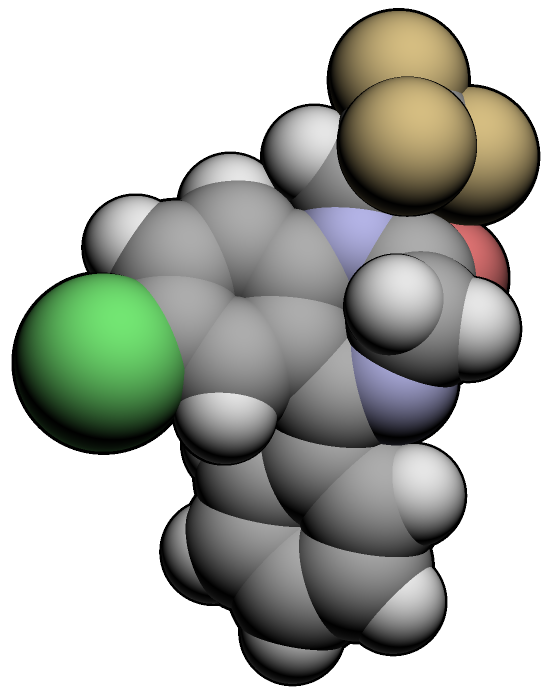

Clinical data
- Other names: 9-chloro-6-phenyl-2-(2,2,2-trifluoroethyl)-2,5-diazabicyclo[5.4.0]undeca-5,8,10,12-tetraen-3-one
- AHFS/Drugs.com: Micromedex Detailed Consumer Information
- MedlinePlus: a684001
- Pregnancy category: ?
- Routes of administration: Oral
- ATC code: N05BA13 (WHO)

Legal status
- Legal status: BR: Class B1 (Psychoactive drugs); CA: Schedule IV; DE: Prescription only (Anlage III for higher doses); US: Schedule IV

Pharmacokinetic data
- Metabolism: Hepatic
- Elimination half-life: 14 hours (halazepam), 50–100 hours (metabolites).
- Excretion: Renal

Identifiers
- IUPAC name: 7-chloro-5-phenyl-1-(2,2,2-trifluoroethyl)-3H-1,4-benzodiazepin-2-one
- CAS Number: 23092-17-3
- PubChem CID: 31640
- IUPHAR/BPS: 7195
- DrugBank: DB00801
- ChemSpider: 29343
- UNII: 320YC168LF
- KEGG: D00338
- ChEMBL: ChEMBL970
- CompTox Dashboard (EPA): DTXSID5023118
- ECHA InfoCard: 100.041.281

Chemical and physical data
- Formula: C_{17}H_{12}ClF_{3}N_{2}O
- Molar mass: 352.74 g·mol^{−1}
- 3D model (JSmol): Interactive image
- SMILES: FC(F)(CN1C(CN=C(C2=CC=CC=C2)C3=C1C=CC(Cl)=C3)=O)F
- InChI: InChI=1S/C17H12ClF3N2O/c18-12-6-7-14-13(8-12)16(11-4-2-1-3-5-11)22-9-15(24)23(14)10-17(19,20)21/h1-8H,9-10H2; Key:WYCLKVQLVUQKNZ-UHFFFAOYSA-N

Halazepam is a benzodiazepine derivative that was marketed under the brand names Paxipam in the United States, Alapryl in Spain, and Pacinone in Portugal.

== Medical uses ==
Halazepam was used for the treatment of anxiety.

== Adverse effects ==
Adverse effects include drowsiness, confusion, dizziness, and sedation. Gastrointestinal side effects have also been reported including dry mouth and nausea.

== Pharmacokinetics and pharmacodynamics ==
Pharmacokinetics and pharmacodynamics were listed in Current Psychotherapeutic Drugs published on June 15, 1998 as follows:

Onset of action	Intermediate to slow
Plasma half life	14 hr for parent drug and 30-100 hr for its metabolite
Peak plasma levels	1-3 hr for parent drug and 3-6 hf for its metabolite
Metabolism	Metabolized into desmethyldiazepam and 3-hydroxyhalazepam (in the liver)
Excretion	Excreted through kidneys
Protein binding	98% bound to plasma protein

== Regulatory Information ==
Halazepam is classified as a schedule 4 controlled substance with a corresponding code 2762 by the Drug Enforcement Administration (DEA).

== Commercial production ==
Halazepam was invented by Schlesinger Walter in the U.S. It was marketed as an anti-anxiety agent in 1981. However, Halazepam is not commercially available in the United States because it was withdrawn by its manufacturer for poor sales.

== See also ==
- Benzodiazepines
- Nordazepam
- Diazepam
- Chlordiazepoxide
- Quazepam, fletazepam, triflubazam — benzodiazepines with trifluoromethyl group attached
