= N-Desalkylflurazepam =

Benzodiazepine metabolite

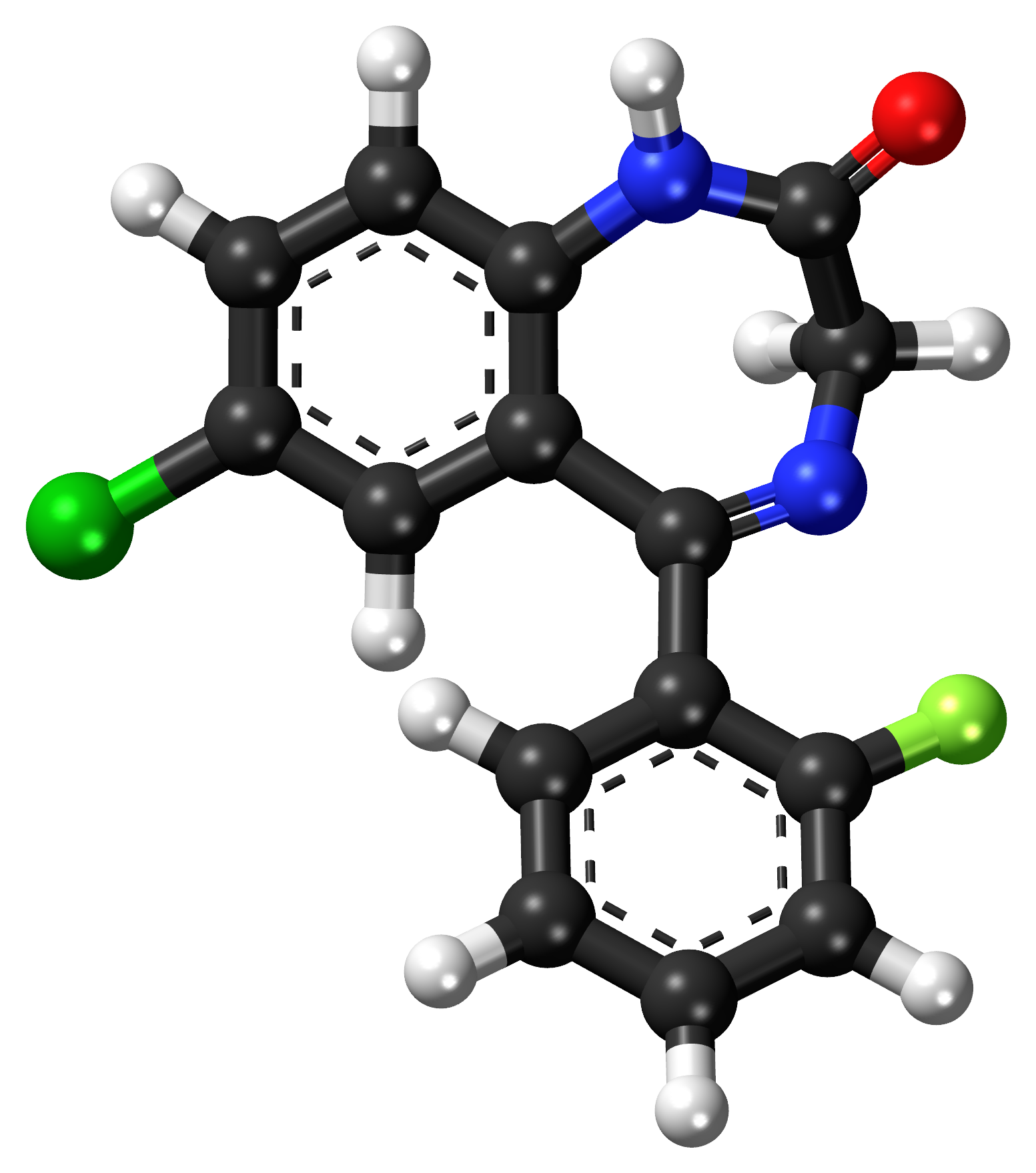

Clinical data
- Routes of administration: By mouth

Legal status
- Legal status: CA: Schedule IV; DE: NpSG (Industrial and scientific use only); UK: Under Psychoactive Substances Act

Pharmacokinetic data
- Bioavailability: Peak plasma concentration achieved within 90-120 minutes
- Metabolism: Liver
- Elimination half-life: 47-150 hours (~71hr avg); 150-200 hours (under continuous administration)
- Excretion: Kidney

Identifiers
- IUPAC name: 7-Chloro-5-(2-fluorophenyl)-1,3-dihydro-1,4-benzodiazepin-2-one
- CAS Number: 2886-65-9
- PubChem CID: 4540
- ChemSpider: 4381
- UNII: X9U41NXR6M
- ChEMBL: ChEMBL974
- CompTox Dashboard (EPA): DTXSID30183057
- ECHA InfoCard: 100.018.863

Chemical and physical data
- Formula: C_{15}H_{10}ClFN_{2}O
- Molar mass: 288.71 g·mol^{−1}
- 3D model (JSmol): Interactive image
- Melting point: 205 to 206 °C (401 to 403 °F)
- SMILES: Fc1ccccc1C2=NCC(=O)Nc3ccc(Cl)cc23

N-Desalkylflurazepam (also known as norflurazepam) is a benzodiazepine analog and an active metabolite of several other benzodiazepine drugs including flurazepam, flutoprazepam, fludiazepam, midazolam, flutazolam, quazepam, and ethyl loflazepate. It is long-acting, prone to accumulation, and binds unselectively to the various benzodiazepine receptor subtypes. It has been sold as a designer drug from 2016 onward.

== Pharmacology ==
=== Pharmacokinetics ===
N-Desalkylflurazepam has an elimination half-life of 47–150 hours (up to 200 hours in some healthy volunteers), with an average of ~71 hours. Peak blood concentrations of N-Desalkylflurazepam is reached at 10.2 h following a single 15 mg dose of Flurazepam, typically around ~10-20.4 ng/mL.

Its plasma levels are unreliable amongst patients, and are largely influenced by liver disease, liver enzyme inducers and inhibitors, as well as old age (in men).
