= Hypersensitivity (disambiguation) =

Hypersensitivity (also called hypersensitivity reaction or intolerance) is an undesirable and adverse immune response to an antigen.

Hypersensitivity or hypersensitive may also refer to:

- Sensory processing sensitivity, a psychological condition relating to sensitivity to processing information
- Hypersensitization, a cellular increase in the expression of a specific receptor
- Dentin hypersensitivity, a cause of dental pain
- Hyperesthesia, abnormal increase in sensitivity to stimuli of the senses
- Electromagnetic hypersensitivity
- Hypersensitive, a music album
- Hypersensitive response, infection defense in plants
- Hypersensitive site, a region in chromatin
- Sensory overload, experiencing overstimulation
- Sensory processing disorder (SPD), a medical condition relating to abnormal multisensory integration

== See also ==
- Supersensitivity (disambiguation)
