= Ethyl loflazepate =

Benzodiazepine medication

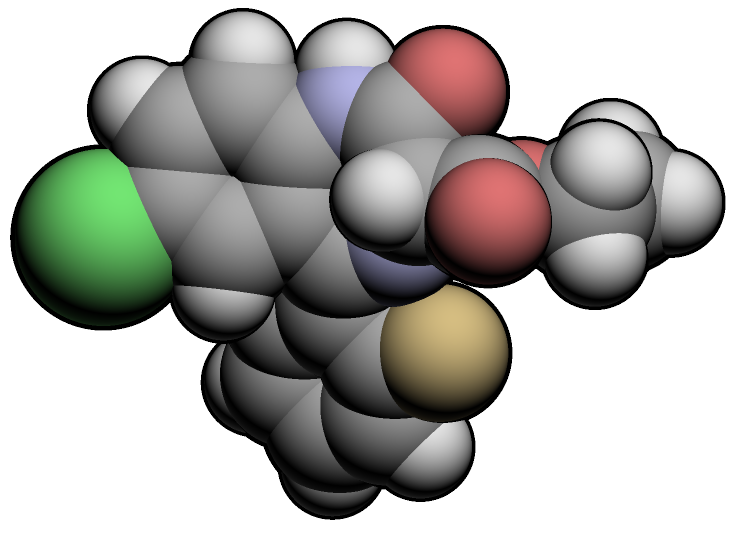

Clinical data
- Trade names: Victan, Meilax, Ronlax
- AHFS/Drugs.com: International Drug Names
- Pregnancy category: ?
- Routes of administration: Oral
- ATC code: N05BA18 (WHO)

Legal status
- Legal status: BR: Class B1 (Psychoactive drugs); CA: Schedule IV; DE: Anlage III (Special prescription form required); US: Schedule IV

Pharmacokinetic data
- Bioavailability: ?
- Metabolism: Hepatic
- Elimination half-life: 51-103 h
- Excretion: Renal

Identifiers
- IUPAC name: ethyl 7-chloro-5-(2-fluorophenyl)-2-oxo-1,3-dihydro-1,4-benzodiazepine-3-carboxylate
- CAS Number: 29177-84-2
- PubChem CID: 3299
- DrugBank: DB01545
- ChemSpider: 3183
- UNII: VJB5FW9W9J
- KEGG: D01293
- ChEMBL: ChEMBL1213460
- CompTox Dashboard (EPA): DTXSID60865475
- ECHA InfoCard: 100.044.976

Chemical and physical data
- Formula: C_{18}H_{14}ClFN_{2}O_{3}
- Molar mass: 360.77 g·mol^{−1}
- 3D model (JSmol): Interactive image
- SMILES: FC1=CC=CC=C1C2=NC(C(OCC)=O)C(NC3=C2C=C(C=C3)Cl)=O
- InChI: InChI=1S/C18H14ClFN2O3/c1-2-25-18(24)16-17(23)21-14-8-7-10(19)9-12(14)15(22-16)11-5-3-4-6-13(11)20/h3-9,16H,2H2,1H3,(H,21,23); Key:CUCHJCMWNFEYOM-UHFFFAOYSA-N

Ethyl loflazepate (marketed under the brand names Meilax, Ronlax and Victan) is a drug which is a benzodiazepine derivative. It possesses anxiolytic, anticonvulsant, sedative and skeletal muscle relaxant properties. In animal studies it was found to have low toxicity, although in rats evidence of pulmonary phospholipidosis occurred with pulmonary foam cells developing with long-term use of very high doses. Its elimination half-life is 51–103 hours. Its mechanism of action is similar to other benzodiazepines. Ethyl loflazepate also produces an active metabolite which is stronger than the parent compound. Ethyl loflazepate was designed to be a prodrug for descarboxyloflazepate, its active metabolite. It is the active metabolite which is responsible for most of the pharmacological effects rather than ethyl loflazepate. The main metabolites of ethyl loflazepate are descarbethoxyloflazepate, loflazepate and 3-hydroxydescarbethoxyloflazepate. Accumulation of the active metabolites of ethyl loflazepate are not affected by those with kidney failure or impairment. The symptoms of an overdose of ethyl loflazepate include sleepiness, agitation and ataxia. Hypotonia may also occur in severe cases. These symptoms occur much more frequently and severely in children. Death from therapeutic maintenance doses of ethyl loflazepate taken for 2 – 3 weeks has been reported in 3 elderly patients. The cause of death was asphyxia due to benzodiazepine toxicity. High doses of the antidepressant fluvoxamine may potentiate the adverse effects of ethyl loflazepate.

Ethyl loflazeplate is commercialized in Belgium, Costa Rica, Dominican Republic, El Salvador, France, Guatemala, Honduras, Mexico, Panama, Paraguay, Portugal and Romania, under the trade name Victan. In Japan, it is prescribed under the name Meilax (メイラックス). It is officially approved for the following conditions:

- Anxiety
- Post-trauma anxiety
- Anxiety associated with severe neuropathic pain
- Generalized anxiety disorder (GAD)
- Obsessive–compulsive disorder
- Panic attack
- Delirium tremens

== See also ==
- Benzodiazepine
