= Disuse supersensitivity =

Disuse supersensitivity, also pharmacological disuse supersensitivity or pharmacological denervation supersensitivity, is the increased sensitivity by a postsynaptic cell because of decreased input by incoming axons, e.g., due to the exposure to an antagonist drug.

Jaffe and Sharpless pointed out that withdrawal syndrome after the cessation of a chronically used drug often shows an exaggerated response which is normally suppressed by the drug which produced a dependence. They suggested the model according to which a drug has both excitatory and depressive effects. Depressive effects generate hypersensitivity, but at the same time they mask it. When drug usage stops, hypersensitivity becomes unmasked.

== See also ==
- Dopamine supersensitivity psychosis
