= Quazepam =

Benzodiazepine

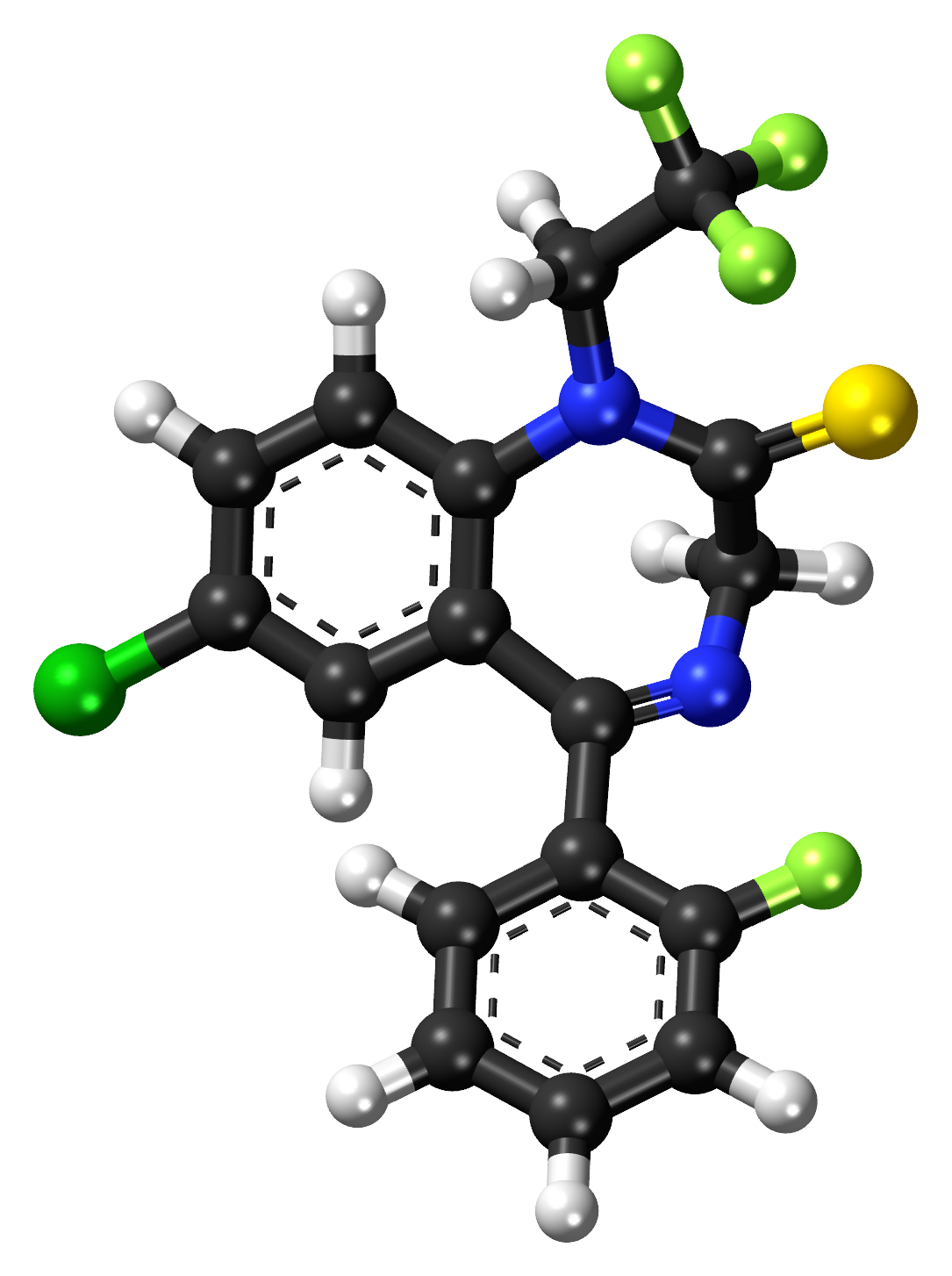

Clinical data
- Trade names: Doral
- AHFS/Drugs.com: Monograph
- MedlinePlus: a684001
- Pregnancy category: AU: D
- Routes of administration: By mouth
- ATC code: N05CD10 (WHO)

Legal status
- Legal status: CA: Schedule IV; US: Schedule IV

Pharmacokinetic data
- Bioavailability: 29–35%
- Metabolism: Liver
- Elimination half-life: 39 hours
- Excretion: Kidney

Identifiers
- IUPAC name: 7-chloro-5-(2-fluorophenyl)-1-(2,2,2-trifluoroethyl)-3H-1,4-benzodiazepine-2-thione
- CAS Number: 36735-22-5
- PubChem CID: 4999
- IUPHAR/BPS: 7288
- DrugBank: DB01589
- ChemSpider: 4825
- UNII: JF8V0828ZI
- KEGG: D00457
- ChEMBL: ChEMBL1200472
- CompTox Dashboard (EPA): DTXSID60190193
- ECHA InfoCard: 100.048.329

Chemical and physical data
- Formula: C_{17}H_{11}ClF_{4}N_{2}S
- Molar mass: 386.79 g·mol^{−1}
- 3D model (JSmol): Interactive image
- SMILES: FC(F)(F)CN1C(=S)C/N=C(\c2cc(Cl)ccc12)c3ccccc3F
- InChI: InChI=1S/C17H11ClF4N2S/c18-10-5-6-14-12(7-10)16(11-3-1-2-4-13(11)19)23-8-15(25)24(14)9-17(20,21)22/h1-7H,8-9H2; Key:IKMPWMZBZSAONZ-UHFFFAOYSA-N

Quazepam, sold under the brand name Doral among others, is a relatively long-acting benzodiazepine derivative drug developed by the Schering Corporation in the 1970s. Quazepam is used for the treatment of insomnia, including sleep induction and sleep maintenance. Quazepam induces impairment of motor function and has relatively (and uniquely) selective hypnotic and anticonvulsant properties with considerably less overdose potential than other benzodiazepines (due to its novel receptor-subtype selectivity). Quazepam is an effective hypnotic which induces and maintains sleep without disruption of the sleep architecture.

It was patented in 1970 and came into medical use in 1985.

== Medical uses ==
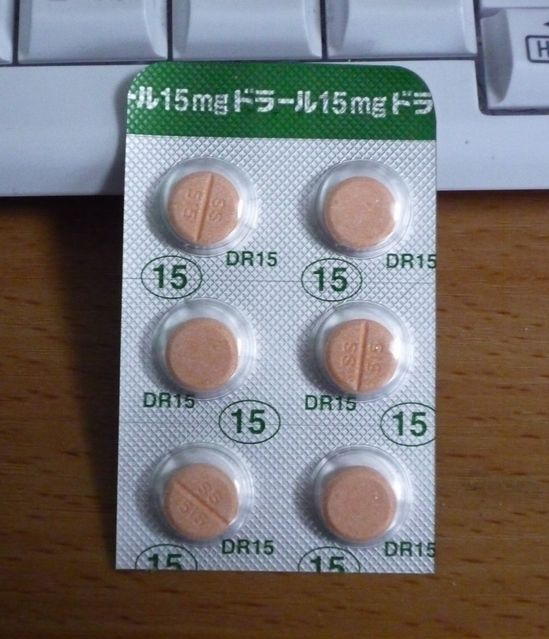
Doral 15 mg tablets from Japan. (2012)

Quazepam is used for short-term treatment of insomnia related to sleep induction or sleep maintenance problems and has demonstrated superiority over other benzodiazepines, such as temazepam. It had a lower incidence of side effects than temazepam, including less sedation, amnesia, and motor impairment. Usual dosage is 7.5 to 15 mg orally at bedtime.

Quazepam is effective as a premedication prior to surgery.

== Side effects ==
Quazepam has fewer side effects than other benzodiazepines and less potential to induce tolerance and rebound effects. There is significantly less potential for quazepam to induce respiratory depression or to adversely affect motor coordination than other benzodiazepines. The different side effect profile of quazepam may be due to its more selective binding profile to type 1 benzodiazepine receptors.

- Ataxia
- Daytime somnolence
- Hypokinesia
- Cognitive and performance impairments

In September 2020, the U.S. Food and Drug Administration (FDA) required the boxed warning be updated for all benzodiazepine medicines to describe the risks of abuse, misuse, addiction, physical dependence, and withdrawal reactions consistently across all the medicines in the class.

=== Tolerance and dependence ===
Tolerance may occur to quazepam, but more slowly than seen with other benzodiazepines such as triazolam. Quazepam causes significantly less drug tolerance and withdrawal symptoms including less rebound insomnia upon discontinuation compared to other benzodiazepines. Quazepam may cause less rebound effects than other type1 benzodiazepine receptor selective nonbenzodiazepine drugs due to its longer half-life. Short-acting hypnotics often cause next-day rebound anxiety. Quazepam, due to its pharmacological profile, does not cause next-day rebound withdrawal effects during treatment.

No firm conclusions can be drawn, however, about whether long-term use of quazepam does not produce tolerance, as few, if any, long-term clinical trials extending beyond 4 weeks of chronic use have been conducted. Quazepam should be withdrawn gradually if used beyond 4 weeks of use to avoid the risk of a severe benzodiazepine withdrawal syndrome developing. Very high dosage administration over prolonged periods of time, up to 52 weeks, of quazepam in animal studies provoked severe withdrawal symptoms upon abrupt discontinuation, including excitability, hyperactivity, convulsions, and the death of two of the monkeys due to withdrawal-related convulsions. More monkeys died however, in the diazepam-treated monkeys. In addition, it has now been documented in the medical literature that one of the major metabolites of quazepam, N-desalkyl-2-oxoquazepam (N-desalkylflurazepam), which is long-acting and prone to accumulation, binds unselectively to benzodiazepine receptors, thus quazepam may not differ all that much pharmacologically from other benzodiazepines.

=== Special precautions ===
Benzodiazepines require special precaution if used during pregnancy, in children, alcohol, or drug-dependent individuals, and individuals with comorbid psychiatric disorders.

Quazepam and its active metabolites are excreted into breast milk.

Accumulation of one of the active metabolites of quazepam, N-desalkylflurazepam, may occur in the elderly. A lower dose may be required for the elderly.

=== Elderly ===
Quazepam is more tolerable for elderly patients compared to flurazepam due to its reduced next-day impairments. However, another study showed marked next-day impairments after repeated administration due to the accumulation of quazepam and its long-acting metabolites. Thus, the medical literature shows conflicts on quazepam's side effect profile. A further study showed significant balance impairments combined with an unstable posture after administration of quazepam in test subjects. An extensive review of the medical literature regarding the management of insomnia and the elderly found that there is considerable evidence of the effectiveness and durability of non-drug treatments for insomnia in adults of all ages and that these interventions are underutilized. Compared with the benzodiazepines, including quazepam, the nonbenzodiazepine sedative/hypnotics appeared to offer few, if any, significant clinical advantages in efficacy or tolerability in elderly persons. It was found that newer agents with novel mechanisms of action and improved safety profiles, such as melatonin agonists, hold promise for the management of chronic insomnia in elderly people. Long-term use of sedative/hypnotics for insomnia lacks an evidence base and has traditionally been discouraged for reasons that include concerns about such potential adverse drug effects as cognitive impairment (anterograde amnesia), daytime sedation, motor incoordination, and increased risk of motor vehicle accidents and falls. In addition, the effectiveness and safety of long-term use of these agents remain to be determined. It was concluded that more research is needed to evaluate the long-term effects of treatment and the most appropriate management strategy for elderly people with chronic insomnia.

== Interactions ==
The absorption rate is likely to be significantly reduced if quazepam is taken in a fasted state, reducing the hypnotic effect of quazepam. If 3 or more hours have passed since eating food, then some food should be eaten before taking quazepam.

== Pharmacology ==
Quazepam is a trifluoroalkyl type of benzodiazepine. Quazepam is unique amongst benzodiazepines in that it selectively targets the GABA_{A} α_{1} subunit receptors, which are responsible for inducing sleep. Its mechanism of action is very similar to zolpidem and zaleplon in its pharmacology and can successfully substitute for zolpidem and zaleplon in animal studies.

Quazepam is selective for type 1 benzodiazepine receptors containing the α_{1} subunit, similar to other drugs such as zaleplon and zolpidem. As a result, quazepam has little or no muscle-relaxant properties. Most other benzodiazepines are unselective and bind to type1 GABA_{A} receptors and type2 GABA_{A} receptors. Type1 GABA_{A} receptors include the α_{1} subunit containing GABA_{A} receptors, which are responsible for the hypnotic properties of the drug. Type 2 receptors include the α_{2}, α_{3} and α_{5} subunits, which are responsible for anxiolytic action, amnesia, and muscle relaxant properties. Thus, quazepam may have less side effects than other benzodiazepines, but, it has a very long half-life of 25 hours, which reduces its benefits as a hypnotic due to likely next day sedation. It also has two active metabolites with half-lives of 28 and 79 hours. Quazepam may also cause less drug tolerance than other benzodiazepines such as temazepam and triazolam, perhaps due to its subtype selectivity. The longer half-life of quazepam may have the advantage, however, of causing less rebound insomnia than shorter-acting subtype selective nonbenzodiazepines. However, one of the major metabolites of quazepam, the N-desmethyl-2-oxoquazepam (N-desalkylflurazepam), binds unselectively to both type 1 and type 2 GABA_{A} receptors. The N-desmethyl-2-oxoquazepam metabolite also has a very long half-life and likely contributes to the pharmacological effects of quazepam.

== Pharmacokinetics ==
2-Oxoquazepam, a major active quazepam metabolite.

Quazepam has an absorption half-life of 0.4 hours with a peak in plasma levels after 1.75 hours. It is eliminated both renally and through feces. The active metabolites of quazepam are 2-oxoquazepam and N-desalkyl-2-oxoquazepam. The N-desalkyl-2-oxoquazepam metabolite has only limited pharmacological activity compared to the parent compound quazepam and the active metabolite 2-oxoquazepam. Quazepam and its major active metabolite 2-oxoquazepam both show high selectivity for the type1 GABA_{A} receptors. The elimination half-life range of quazepam is between 27 and 41 hours.

== Mechanism of action ==
Quazepam modulates specific GABA_{A} receptors via the benzodiazepine site on the GABA_{A} receptor. This modulation enhances the actions of GABA, causing an increase in the opening frequency of the chloride ion channel, which results in an increased influx of chloride ions into the GABA_{A} receptors. Quazepam, unique amongst benzodiazepine drugs, selectively targets type 1 benzodiazepine receptors, which results in reduced sleep latency and promotion of sleep. Quazepam also has some anticonvulsant properties.

== EEG and sleep ==
Quazepam has potent sleep-inducing and sleep-maintaining properties. Studies in both animals and humans have demonstrated that EEG changes induced by quazepam resemble normal sleep patterns, whereas other benzodiazepines disrupt normal sleep. Quazepam promotes slow-wave sleep. This positive effect of quazepam on sleep architecture may be due to its high selectivity for type 1 benzodiazepine receptors, as demonstrated in animal and human studies. This makes quazepam unique in the benzodiazepine family of drugs.

== Drug misuse ==
Quazepam is a drug with the potential for misuse. Two types of drug misuse can occur: either recreational misuse, where the drug is taken to achieve a high, or when the drug is continued long term against medical advice.
