= Fosazepam =

Benzodiazepine

Clinical data
- ATC code: none

Identifiers
- IUPAC name: 7-chloro-1-(dimethylphosphorylmethyl)-5-phenyl-3H-1,4-benzodiazepin-2-one
- CAS Number: 35322–07–7
- PubChem CID: 37114
- ChemSpider: 34056
- UNII: 13AK3H33SG
- KEGG: D04248
- CompTox Dashboard (EPA): DTXSID10188828

Chemical and physical data
- Formula: C_{18}H_{18}ClN_{2}O_{2}P
- Molar mass: 360.78 g·mol^{−1}
- 3D model (JSmol): Interactive image
- SMILES: ClC1=CC2=C(C=C1)N(CP(C)(C)=O)C(CN=C2C3=CC=CC=C3)=O
- InChI: InChI=1S/C18H18ClN2O2P/c1-24(2,23)12-21-16-9-8-14(19)10-15(16)18(20-11-17(21)22)13-6-4-3-5-7-13/h3-10H,11-12H2,1-2H3; Key:JMYCGCXYZZHWMO-UHFFFAOYSA-N

Fosazepam is a drug belonging to the benzodiazepine class, which are primarily anti-anxiety and sedative-hypnotic agents. It is a water soluble derivative of diazepam which has been substituted with a dimethylphosphoryl group to improve solubility in water. At equipotent doses (100 mg fosazepam and 10 mg diazepam), it possesses sedative and anxiolytic properties that are qualitatively and quantitatively similar to the effects of diazepam, with equal sedative-hypnotic, anti-convulsive, and muscle relaxant effects. In comparison to an equipotent dose of nitrazepam (100 mg fosazepam and 10 mg nitrazepam), its effects tended to be of noticeably milder magnitude.

Fosazepam has similar effects on sleep as other benzodiazepines. In a clinical trial it was reported that fosazepam to lead to increased sleep duration with less broken sleep but sleep quality was worsened with suppressed deep sleep and increased light sleep. Adverse effects included feelings of impaired morning vitality and upon discontinuing the drug benzodiazepine withdrawal symptoms of anxiety, impaired concentration and impaired morning vitality were experienced. Another clinical trial also found worsening of sleep while on benzodiazepines as well as during withdrawal with suppression of deep sleep stages including REM sleep, with increased light sleep upon withdrawal. The main metabolites of fosazepam are 3-hydroxyfosazepam and the active metabolite desmethyldiazepam which has a very long elimination half-life of about 3 days. Tolerance to the hypnotic effects of fosazepam starts to develop after about 7 days of use. Due to the very long elimination half-life of the active metabolite of fosazepam it is not recommended for use as a hypnotic. The main pharmacological effects of fosazepam may be due to its metabolite nordiazepam (desmethyldiazepam), rather than the parent drug. The long-acting active metabolite nordazepam can cause extended sedative effects at high doses or with prolonged use, and may produce residual sedation upon awakening.

Fosazepam is of relatively low potency compared to other benzodiazepine derivatives, with a 100 mg dose of fosazepam equivalent to 10 mg of diazepam and 10 mg nitrazepam. 60 mg of fosazepam has also been estimated to be equivalent to about 6 mg of diazepam. Fosazepam has similar effects to nitrazepam, but with a shorter duration of action and less tendency to cause over sedation, motor-impairment, amnesia, rebound insomnia, and morning grogginess.

== See also ==
- Benzodiazepine
- Midazolam - water-soluble benzodiazepine for anesthesia
