= Flurazepam =

Hypnotic medication

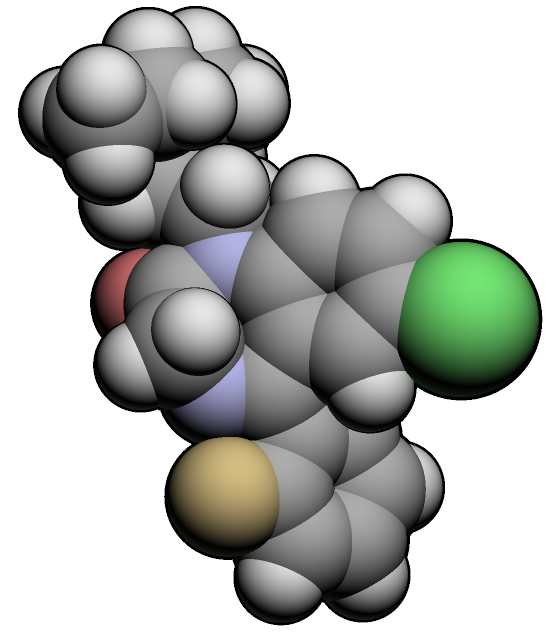

Clinical data
- Trade names: Dalmane, Dalmadorm, Fluzepam
- AHFS/Drugs.com: Monograph
- MedlinePlus: a682051
- Pregnancy category: X (Contraindicated in pregnancy)
- Addiction liability: Moderate
- Routes of administration: By mouth
- Drug class: Benzodiazepine
- ATC code: N05CD01 (WHO)

Legal status
- Legal status: BR: Class B1 (Psychoactive drugs); CA: Schedule IV; DE: Prescription only (Anlage III for higher doses); US: Schedule IV; SE: Förteckning IV In general: ℞ (Prescription only)

Pharmacokinetic data
- Bioavailability: 83%
- Metabolism: Liver
- Metabolites: N-desalkylflurazepam (active metabolite)
- Elimination half-life: 2.3 hours N-desalkylflurazepam: 47–100 hours
- Excretion: Kidney

Identifiers
- IUPAC name: 7-Chloro-1-[2-(diethylamino)ethyl]-5-(2-fluorophenyl)-1,3-dihydro-2H-1,4-benzodiazepin-2-one
- CAS Number: 17617-23-1
- PubChem CID: 3393
- IUPHAR/BPS: 7188
- DrugBank: DB00690
- ChemSpider: 3276
- UNII: IHP475989U
- KEGG: D00329
- ChEBI: CHEBI:5128
- ChEMBL: ChEMBL968
- PDB ligand: FL7 (PDBe, RCSB PDB)
- CompTox Dashboard (EPA): DTXSID1023071
- ECHA InfoCard: 100.037.795

Chemical and physical data
- Formula: C_{21}H_{23}ClFN_{3}O
- Molar mass: 387.88 g·mol^{−1}
- 3D model (JSmol): Interactive image
- Melting point: 79.5 °C (175.1 °F)
- SMILES: FC1=CC=CC=C1C2=NCC(N(CCN(CC)CC)C3=C2C=C(C=C3)Cl)=O
- InChI: InChI=1S/C21H23ClFN3O/c1-3-25(4-2)11-12-26-19-10-9-15(22)13-17(19)21(24-14-20(26)27)16-7-5-6-8-18(16)23/h5-10,13H,3-4,11-12,14H2,1-2H3; Key:SAADBVWGJQAEFS-UHFFFAOYSA-N

Flurazepam (marketed under the brand names Dalmane and Dalmadorm) is a drug which is a benzodiazepine derivative. It possesses anxiolytic, anticonvulsant, hypnotic, sedative and skeletal muscle relaxant properties. It produces a metabolite with a long half-life, which may stay in the bloodstream for days. Flurazepam was patented in 1968 and came into medical use the same year. Flurazepam, developed by Roche Pharmaceuticals, was one of the first benzodiazepine hypnotic medications to be marketed.

== Medical uses ==
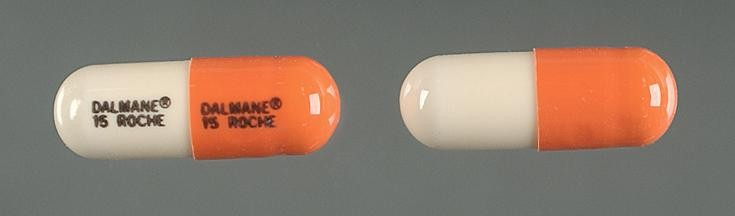
Two Dalmane (flurazepam) capsules

Flurazepam is officially indicated for mild to moderate insomnia and as such it is used for short-term treatment of patients with mild to moderate insomnia such as difficulty falling asleep, frequent awakening, early awakenings or a combination of each. Flurazepam is a long-acting benzodiazepine and is sometimes used in patients who have difficulty in maintaining sleep, though benzodiazepines with intermediate half-lives such as alprazolam, loprazolam, lorazepam, lormetazepam, oxazepam and temazepam are also indicated for patients with difficulty maintaining sleep.

Flurazepam was temporarily unavailable in the United States when its sole producer, Mylan Pharmaceuticals, discontinued making it in January 2019. In October 2019, the FDA informed pharmacies that they could expect to be resupplied by manufacturers in early to mid December 2019. After a delay, Chartwell Pharmaceuticals began manufacturing flurazepam again in November 2023, since then it is available in the U.S. in the form of 15 mg and 30 mg capsules.

== Side effects ==
The most common adverse effects are dizziness, drowsiness, light-headedness, and ataxia. Flurazepam has abuse potential and should never be used with alcoholic beverages or any other substance that can cause drowsiness. Addictive and possibly fatal results may occur. Flurazepam users should only take this drug strictly as prescribed, and should only be taken directly before the user plans on sleeping a full night. Next day drowsiness is common and may increase during the initial phase of treatment as accumulation occurs until steady-state plasma levels are attained.

A 2009 meta-analysis found a 44% higher rate of mild infections, such as pharyngitis or sinusitis, in people taking hypnotic drugs compared to those taking a placebo.

In September 2020, the U.S. Food and Drug Administration (FDA) required the boxed warning be updated for all benzodiazepine medicines to describe the risks of abuse, misuse, addiction, physical dependence, and withdrawal reactions consistently across all the medicines in the class.

=== Tolerance, dependence and withdrawal ===
A review paper found that long-term use of flurazepam is associated with drug tolerance, drug dependence, rebound insomnia and central nervous system (CNS) related adverse effects. Flurazepam is best used for a short time period and at the lowest possible dose to avoid complications associated with long-term use. Non-pharmacological treatment options however, were found to have sustained improvements in sleep quality. Flurazepam and other benzodiazepines such as fosazepam, and nitrazepam lost some of their effect after seven days administration in psychogeriatric patients. Flurazepam shares cross tolerance with barbiturates and barbiturates can easily be substituted by flurazepam in those who are habituated to barbiturate sedative hypnotics.

After discontinuation of flurazepam a rebound effect or benzodiazepine withdrawal syndrome may occur about four days after discontinuation of medication.

== Contraindications and special caution ==
Benzodiazepines require special precaution if used in the elderly, during pregnancy, in children, alcohol- or drug-dependent individuals and individuals with comorbid psychiatric disorders.

=== Elderly ===
Flurazepam, similar to other benzodiazepines and nonbenzodiazepine hypnotic drugs causes impairments in body balance and standing steadiness in individuals who wake up at night or the next morning. Falls and hip fractures are frequently reported. The combination with alcohol increases these impairments. Partial, but incomplete tolerance develops to these impairments. An extensive review of the medical literature regarding the management of insomnia and the elderly found that there is considerable evidence of the effectiveness and durability of non-drug treatments for insomnia in adults of all ages and that these interventions are underutilized. Compared with the benzodiazepines including flurazepam, the nonbenzodiazepine sedative-hypnotics appeared to offer few, if any, significant clinical advantages in efficacy in elderly persons. Tolerability in elderly patients, however, is improved marginally in that benzodiazepines have moderately higher risks of falls, memory problems, and disinhibition ("paradoxical agitation") when compared to non-benzodiazepine sedatives. It was found that newer agents with novel mechanisms of action and improved safety profiles, such as the melatonin agonists, hold promise for the management of chronic insomnia in elderly people. Chronic use of sedative-hypnotic drugs for the management of insomnia does not have an evidence base and has been discouraged due to concerns including potential adverse drug effects as cognitive impairment (anterograde amnesia), daytime sedation, motor incoordination, and increased risk of motor vehicle accidents and falls. In addition, the effectiveness and safety of long-term use of sedative hypnotics has been determined to be no better than placebo after 3 months of therapy and worse than placebo after 6 months of therapy.

== Pharmacology ==
Flurazepam is a "classical" benzodiazepine; some other classical benzodiazepines include diazepam, clonazepam, oxazepam, lorazepam, nitrazepam, bromazepam, and clorazepate. Flurazepam generates an active metabolite, N-desalkylflurazepam, with a very long elimination half-life. Flurazepam could be therefore unsuitable as a sleeping medication for some individuals due to next-day sedation; however, this same effect may also provide next-day anxiety relief. Residual 'hangover' effects after nighttime administration of flurazepam, such as sleepiness, impaired psychomotor and cognitive functions, may persist into the next day, which may impair the ability of users to drive safely and increase risks of falls and hip fractures.

Flurazepam is lipophilic, is metabolized hepatically via oxidative pathways. The main pharmacological effect of flurazepam is to increase the effect of GABA at the GABA_{A} receptor via binding to the benzodiazepine site on the GABA_{A} receptor causing an increase influx of chloride ions into the GABA_{A} neuron.

Flurazepam is contraindicated in pregnancy. It is recommended to withdraw flurazepam during breast feeding, as flurazepam is excreted in breast milk.

== Misuse ==
Flurazepam is a drug with potential for misuse. Two types of drug misuse can occur, either recreational misuse where the drug is taken to achieve a high, or when the drug is continued long term against medical advice.

=== Legal status ===
Flurazepam is a Schedule IV drug under the Convention on Psychotropic Substances.

== See also ==
- Long-term effects of benzodiazepines
