= Tardive dysmentia =

Tardive dysmentia is a rarely used term introduced in a 1983 paper to describe "changes in affect, activation level, and interpersonal interaction", and hypothesized to be caused by long-term exposure to neuroleptic drugs in the same way as the much better-known syndrome of tardive dyskinesia. Several papers in the following years discussed the validity of the concept, and this small literature was reviewed in a 1993 publication by M. S. Myslobodsky, who drew attention to the "possibility that the syndrome of dysmentia is composed of occasional excessive emotional reactivity, enhanced responsiveness to environmental stimuli, and indifference to or reduced awareness of the patient's abnormal involuntary movements", but concluded that the pathophysiology was uncertain. Since then, the term has fallen into disuse, receiving at most only passing mentions in the literature.

== See also ==
- List of long-term side effects of antipsychotics
