= Serum Metabolome Database =

Web database about small molecule metabolites found in human serum

The Serum Metabolome database is a free web database about small molecule metabolites found in human serum and their concentration values. The database includes chemical data, clinical data and molecular/biochemistry data from literature and experiment. This database also references many other databases, such as KEGG, PubChem, MetaCyc, ChEBI, PDB, Swiss-Prot, GenBank, and Human Metabolome Database (HMDB).

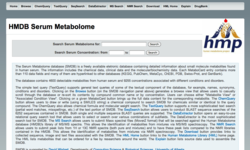
Serum metabolome database website home page

The Serum Metabolome database is maintained by David S. Wishart.

The Serum Metabolome database protocol is available via its website.
