= Couple =

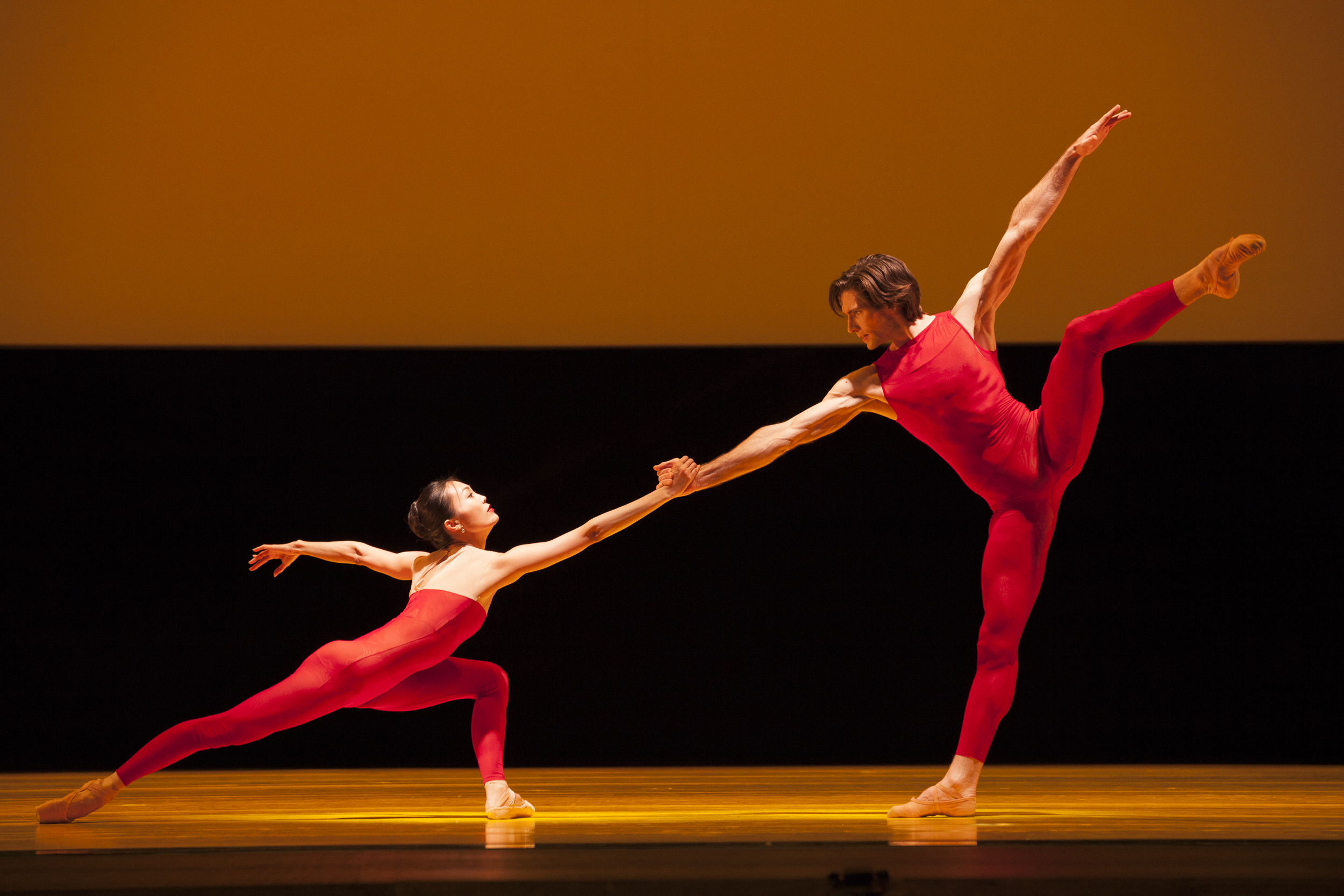
A couple of ballet dancers, Yuka Ebihara and Vladimir Yaroshenko in Bolero by Krzysztof Pastor (2016).

Couple or couples may refer to:

- Couple, a set of two of items of a type
- Couple (mechanics), a pair of forces which are equal in magnitude but opposite in direction and separated by a perpendicular distance so that their line of action do not coincide that cause a turning effect
- Couple (relationship), two people in an intimate relationship

== Arts and entertainment ==
- Couples (novel), by John Updike, 1968
- "Couples" (Duty Free), a 1984 television episode

=== Films ===
- Couples (2011 film), a South Korean film
- Couples (1999 film), a Spanish comedy film
- Couples, a 1994 American television film directed by Betty Thomas
- The Aryan Couple, a 2004 drama film released in the U.S. as The Couple
- A Couple, 2022 French film

=== Music ===
- Couple, a 2004 album by Kim Yeon-woo
- Couples (Pizzicato Five album), 1987
- Couples (The Long Blondes album), 2008
- "Couples", a song by Pizzicato Five from the 1998 album Bellissima!
- Le Couple, a Japanese band

== Other uses ==
- Couple (mathematics), a tuple of length 2
- Couple (app), a mobile app
- Couple, a pair of rafters
- Fred Couples (born 1959), American professional golfer

== See also ==
- Coupler (disambiguation)
- Couplet (disambiguation)
- Coupling (disambiguation)
- Decoupling (disambiguation)
- Odd Couple (disambiguation)
- Uncouple (disambiguation)
- Coupled, an American dating game show
- Thermocouple, a type of temperature sensor
- The Biggest Loser, a reality television format
