= Decoupling =

Decoupling usually refers to the ending, removal or reverse of coupling.

Decoupling may also refer to:

== Economics ==
- Decoupling (advertising), the purchase of services directly from suppliers rather than via an advertising agency
- Decoupling (utility regulation), the disassociation of a utility's profits from its sales
- Decoupling and re-coupling in economics, where country's economies are no longer impacted by each other
- Decoupling (organizational studies), creating and maintaining separation between policy, implementation and/or practice
- Decoupling of wages from productivity, sometimes known as the Great Decoupling
- Eco-economic decoupling, economic growth without increase in environmental costs

== Science ==
- Decoupling (cosmology), transition from close interactions between particles to their effective independence
- Decoupling (meteorology), change in the interaction between atmospheric layers at night
- Decoupling (neuropsychopharmacology), changes in neurochemical binding sites as a consequence of drug tolerance
- Nuclear magnetic resonance decoupling
- Decoupling (probability), reduction of a statistic to an average derived from independent random-variable sequences
- Decoupling for body-focused repetitive behaviors, technique for the reduction of body-focused repetitive behaviors

== Engineering ==
- Decoupling (electronics), prevention of undesired energy transfer between electrical media
  - Decoupling capacitor, most common implementation technique
- The amelioration of coupling in computer programming

== Other ==
- Uncoupling of railway carriages

== See also ==
- Uncoupling (disambiguation)
- Coupling (disambiguation)
