= Uncoupling =

Uncoupling or uncouple may refer to:

- Uncoupling (neuropsychopharmacology), changes in neurochemical binding sites as a consequence of drug tolerance.
- An uncoupling protein in cell biology.
- An uncoupling agent in cell biology.
- Uncoupling (or decoupling) rail vehicles.

== See also ==
- Decoupling (disambiguation)
- Coupling (disambiguation)
- Coupler (disambiguation)
- Couple (disambiguation)
- Uncoupled, a Netflix romantic comedy series starring Neil Patrick Harris
