= List of The Odd Couple episodes =

List of The Odd Couple episodes may refer to:

- List of The Odd Couple (1970 TV series) episodes, episode list of the 1970-1975 ABC sitcom
- List of The Odd Couple (2015 TV series) episodes, episode list of the 2015-2017 CBS sitcom

== See also ==
- Odd Couple (disambiguation)
