= Fuel system =

Fuel system may refer to:

- Aircraft fuel system
- in automobiles and their industry, the combination of fuel tanks, fuel pumps, fuel pipes, fuel injection
