= Coupler =

Coupler may refer to:

== Engineering ==
=== Mechanical ===
- Railway coupler, a mechanism for connecting rolling stock on a train
  - Janney coupler
  - SA3 coupler
  - Scharfenberg coupler for multiple unit passenger cars
- Quick coupler, used in construction machines to allow the rapid change of buckets
- Coupling, a device used to connect two shafts together at their ends for the purpose of transmitting power
  - Universal coupling, a joint or coupling in a rigid rod that allows the rod to 'bend' in any direction

=== Electronics ===
- Acoustic coupler, for coupling electrical signals by acoustical means
- Directional coupler, a passive device used in radio technology
- Antenna coupler, a device connected between a radio transmitter or receiver and its antenna
- Output coupler, a partially reflective mirror used in lasers
- Optocoupler, an electronic component that transfers electrical signals between two isolated circuits by using light

== Other uses ==
- Coupler (piping), also called a (joist) short length of pipe with two female threads
- Coupler, a device used on a pipe organ
- Coupler, a device used on a harpsichord
- Coupler, a tap valve, for controlling the release of beer out of a keg
- Coupler, the floating link in a four-bar linkage
- Hydrant coupler, for aircraft fueling equipment

== See also ==
- Coupling (disambiguation)
- Decoupling (disambiguation)
