= Gascolator =

Aircraft mechanism

A gascolator, also known as a main line strainer, sediment bowl or fuel strainer, acts primarily as a fuel drain for water and small particles of sediment and is usually found at the lowest point of an aircraft's fuel system. The gascolator is located below the level of the aircraft's carburetor and fuel tanks and on light aircraft is commonly located on the front of the firewall, as low as possible.

There are two types of gascolators: those tapped for a primer port and those without. If equipped with a primer port the aircraft fuel primer will take its fuel supply from the gascolator, used for engine starting.

Gascolators are susceptible to the effects of heat from the co-located engine and exhaust components, which can cause fuel vapourization in the gascolator and vapour lock problems. This usually manifests itself as a partial power loss in cruise flight. To combat this problem some installations use a gascolator heat shield or free air blast tubes to cool the gascolator.

Some types of gascolators are equipped with a remote spring-loaded knob to drain them. Writer Tony Bingelis says of this type:

A gascolator with a lazy man's quick drain (that is, one you can work standing up by merely pulling on a spring-loaded handle) has its shortcomings. It is generally a heavier unit than a simple gascolator and is also more expensive. It is not as effective either, because the pilot usually allows the fuel to drain on the ground. This is a slipshod way of checking for water in the system.
