= Short-coupled =

Short coupled or short-coupled may refer to:

- Short-coupled aircraft, an aircraft with a relatively short distance between the wing and empennage. This can lead to pilot-induced oscillation
- A short-coupled horse, which has a generally desirable conformational structure to its back over the lumbar vertebrae, the region sometimes called the loin in other animals

== See also ==
- Coupling (disambiguation)
