= Income distribution =

Distribution of a country's total GDP amongst its population

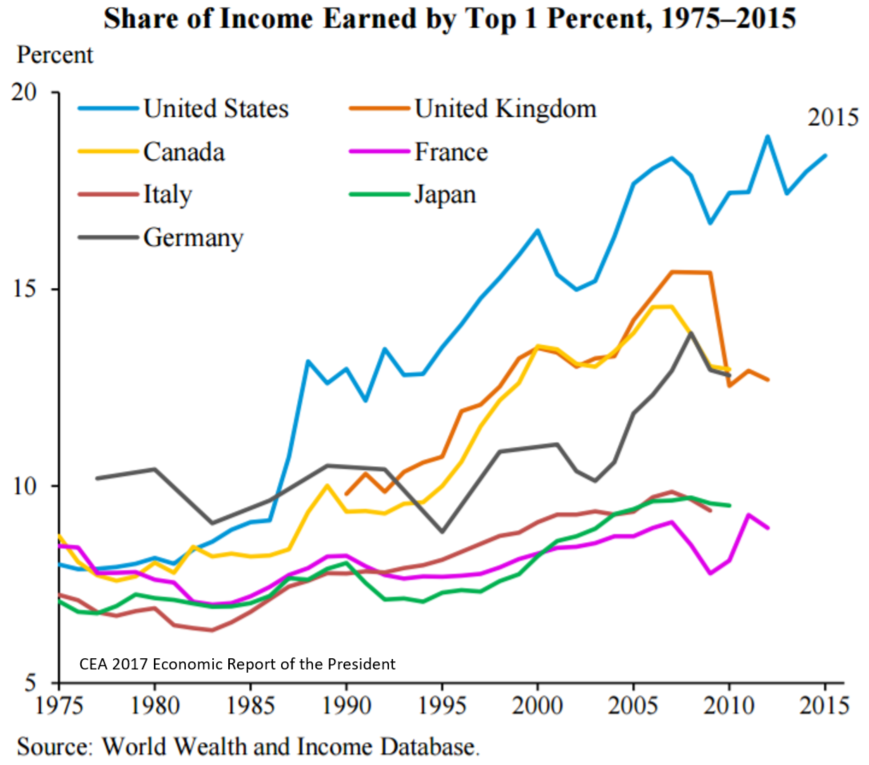
Share of income of the top 1% for selected developed countries, 1975 to 2015

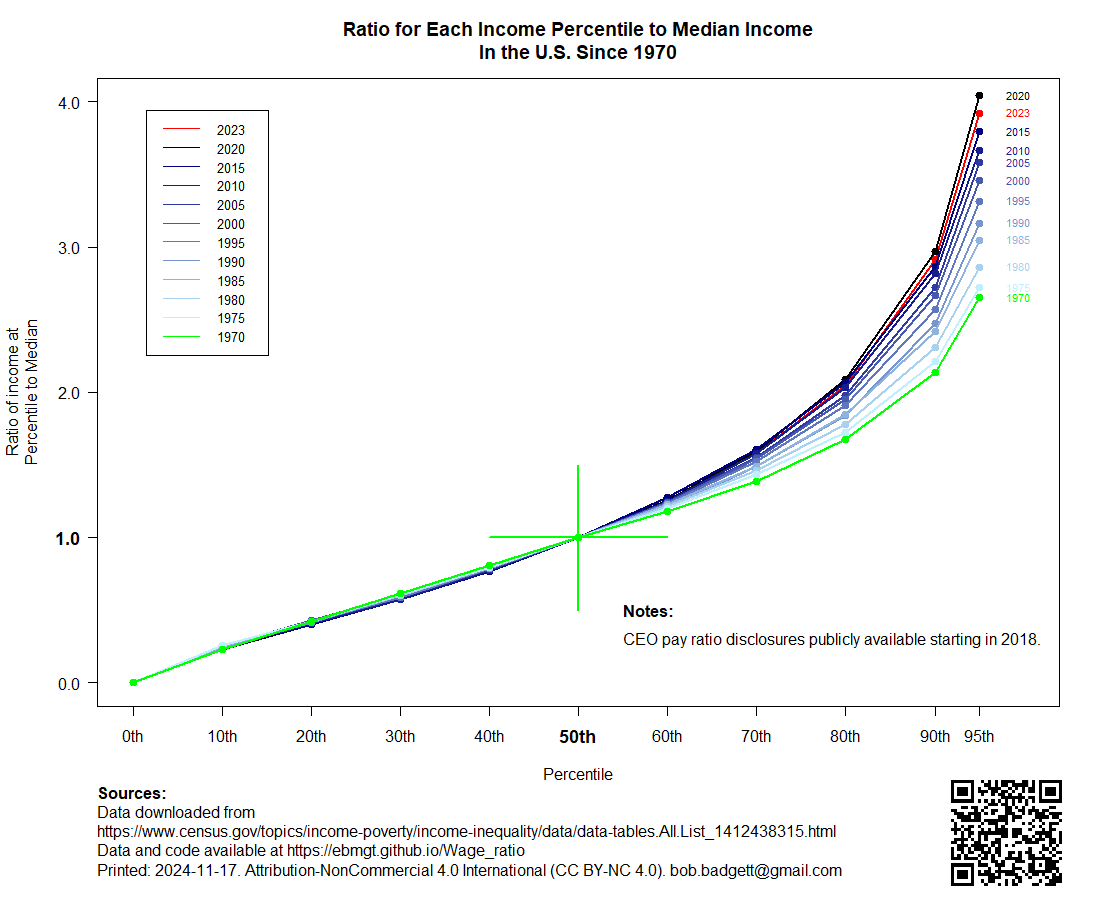
Its not just the top 1% who is gaining. Ratio for Each Income Percentile to median income in the U.S. Since 1970. The plot shows the increase in the relative gains of those above the median versus those below the median with the largest gains for those in the highest percentile. Finally, in 2023 the disproportionate rise of the top earners fell (red line).

In economics, income distribution covers how a country's total GDP is distributed amongst its population. Economic theory and economic policy have long seen income and its distribution as a central concern. Unequal distribution of income causes economic inequality which is a concern in almost all countries around the world.

== About ==
Classical economists such as Adam Smith (1723–1790), Thomas Malthus (1766–1834), and David Ricardo (1772–1823) concentrated their attention on factor income-distribution, that is, the distribution of income between the primary factors of production (land, labour and capital). Modern economists have also addressed issues of income distribution, but have focused more on the distribution of income across individuals and households. Important theoretical and policy concerns include the balance between income inequality and economic growth, and their often inverse relationship.

The Lorenz curve can represent the distribution of income within a society. The Lorenz curve is closely associated with measures of income inequality, such as the Gini coefficient. World Bank lists 118 countries based on consumption inequality compared to 68 countries based on income inequality.

=== Measurement ===
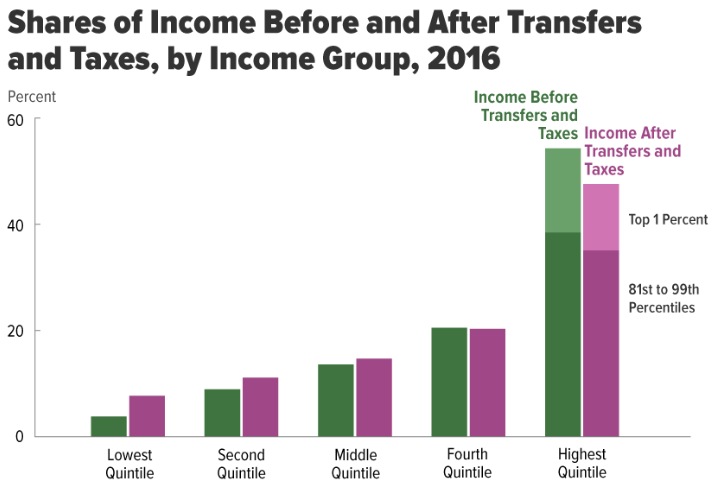
Income before (green) and after (pink) taxes and Transfer payments for different income groups starting with the lowest quintile. Top 20% people take approximately 45% of the all income.

The concept of inequality is distinct from that of poverty and fairness. Income inequality metrics (or income distribution metrics) are used by social scientists to measure the distribution of income, and economic inequality among the participants in a particular economy, such as that of a specific country or of the world in general. While different theories may try to explain how income inequality comes about, income inequality metrics simply provide a system of measurement used to determine the dispersion of incomes.

Gini Coefficient: A measure that represents the income or wealth distribution among a nation's residents, with 0 expressing perfect equality and 1 indicating perfect inequality. Lorenz Curve: A graphical representation of income distribution, where a perfectly straight line (45-degree line) reflects absolute equality. Quintile and Decile Ratios: These divide the population into equal parts (quintiles - fifths, deciles - tenths) to compare the income shares received by each group.

=== Economic Theories and Government Policies ===
Various economic theories address income distribution, from classical economics, which tends to focus on market mechanisms, to Keynesian economics, which emphasizes the role of government intervention. Policies to influence income distribution include:

Progressive Taxation: Taxing higher incomes at higher rates to redistribute income more evenly. Public Spending: Directing government expenditure towards education, healthcare, and social security to support lower-income groups. Wage Policies: Implementing minimum wage laws and encouraging collective bargaining to improve wages for low- and middle-income workers. International Perspectives on Income Distribution Income distribution varies greatly around the world. Comparing countries through tools like the World Income Inequality Database (WIID) or the Standardized World Income Inequality Database (SWIID) can provide insights into global patterns and the effectiveness of different policies.

Trends and Current Data Recent trends in income distribution show increasing income inequality in many parts of the world. This trend has been exacerbated by globalization and changes in the global economy. Current data from sources like the OECD can be used to update the article with the latest figures and trends.

==== Neoclassical theory of distribution ====
According to this theory, the distribution of national income is determined by factor prices, the payment to each factor of production (wage for labor, rent for land, interest for capital, profit for entrepreneurship) which themselves are derived from the equilibrium of supply and demand in that factor's market, and finally, are equal to the marginal productivity of the factors of production. A change in the quantity of any one of the factors will affect the marginal production, supply and demand of factors and eventually alter the income distribution from firms to households within the economy.

== Income inequality and its causes ==
Income inequality is one aspect of economic inequality. Incomes levels can be studied through taxation records and other historical documents. Capital in the Twenty-First Century (2013) by French economist Thomas Piketty is noted for its systematic collection and review of available data, especially concerning income levels; not all aspects of historical wealth distribution are similarly attested in the available records.

Causes of income inequality and of levels of economic equality/inequality include: labor economics, tax policies, other economic policies, labor union policies, Federal Reserve monetary policies & fiscal policies, the market for labor, abilities of individual workers, technology and automation, education, globalization, gender bias, racism, and culture.

Addressing income inequality requires comprehensive policy interventions that consider these diverse causes, including improving access to education, reforming tax systems, ensuring fair labor practices, and implementing social policies that promote equity and economic mobility.

Further Reading(s):

- Eisenbarth, A., Chen, Z.F. The evolution of wage inequality within local U.S. labor markets. J Labour Market Res 56, 2 (2022). https://doi.org/10.1186/s12651-022-00307-6

== How to improve income equality ==
=== Taxes ===
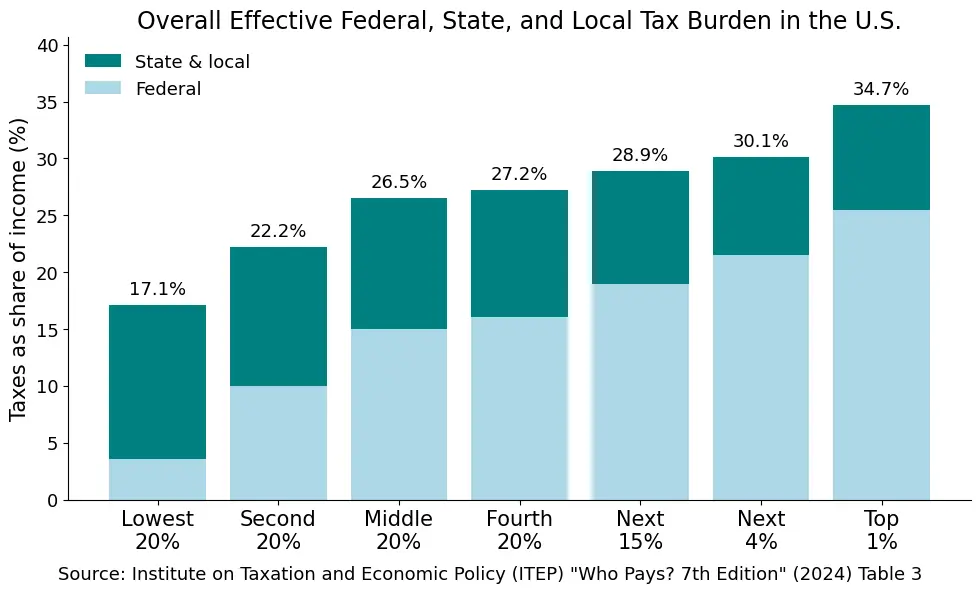
Overall tax burden in the US in 2024

The progressive income tax takes a larger percentage of high incomes and a smaller percentage of low incomes. Effectively, the poorest pay the least of their earned incomes on taxes which allows them to keep a larger percentage of wealth. Justification can be illustrated by a simple heuristic: The same dollar amount of money (e.g. $100) has a greater economic impact on only one party—the poor. That same amount has little economic impact on a wealthy individual, so the disparity is addressed by ensuring the richest individuals are taxed a greater share of their wealth. The state then uses the tax revenue to fund necessary and beneficial activities for the society at large. Every person in this system would have access to the same social benefits, but the rich pay more for it, so progressive tax significantly reduces the inequality.

=== Income mobility ===
Income mobility is another factor in the study of income inequality. It describes how people change their economic well-being, i.e. move in the hierarchy of earning power over their lifetime. When someone improves his economic situation, this person is considered upwardly mobile. Mobility can vary between two extremes: 1) rich people stay rich and poor stay poor: people cannot easily change their economic status and inequality then seems as a permanent problem. 2) individuals can easily shift their income class, e.g. from middle earning class to upper class or from lower class to middle class. Inequality is "fluid" and temporary so it does not create a serious permanent problem.

==== Measuring income mobility ====
Mobility is measured by the association between parents´ and adult children's socioeconomic standing, where higher association means less mobility. Socioeconomic standing is captured by four different measures:

1. Occupational status: – it is weighted average of the mean level of earnings and education of certain occupations. It has advantages such a collecting important information about parents, which can be reported retrospectively by adult children. It also remains relatively stable in between the occupation career so single measuring provides adequate information of long run standing. On the other hand, it has also limitations for the mobility analyzing. Whereas occupational earning of men usually tends to be higher than by women, by the occupational education it is the other way around.
2. Class mobility: – Classes are instead categorical groupings based on specific occupational assets that determine life chances as expressed in outcomes such as income, health or wealth.
3. Earnings mobility: – Earning mobility evaluates the relationship between two certain generations by means of linear regression (upper math) of the long transformed measure of children's and parents' earnings.
4. Total family income mobility and the mobility of women: – Old economic analysis has been making one mistake, that they did analysis that focused mostly on the father-son pairs and their individual earnings. In the last two decades, they have expanded their research and now they focus more on the mother-daughter pairs as well. Generally earnings provides a stable measure of well-being independently of another financial assets or any kind of transfers.

=== Labor union ===
It is known that labor union reduces the income inequality in both private and public sectors, and research conducted by David Card et al. showed that unionization redressed the income inequality in America and Canada, especially in their public sectors. For American male workers, the reduction of wage inequality was 1.7 percent in the private sector, while the reduction was 16.2 percent in the public sector. For American female workers, the reductions were 0.6 percent and 10.7 percent in the private and public sectors, respectively. In Canada, reduction effects were likewise more noticeable in the public sector.

== Distribution measurement internationally ==
Using Gini coefficients, several organizations, such as the United Nations (UN) and the US Central Intelligence Agency (CIA), have measured income inequality by country. The Gini index is also widely used within the World Bank. It is an accurate and reliable index for measuring income distribution on a country by country level. The Gini index measurements go from 0 to 1 for 1 being perfect inequality and 0 being perfect equality. The world Gini index is measured at 0.52 as of 2016.

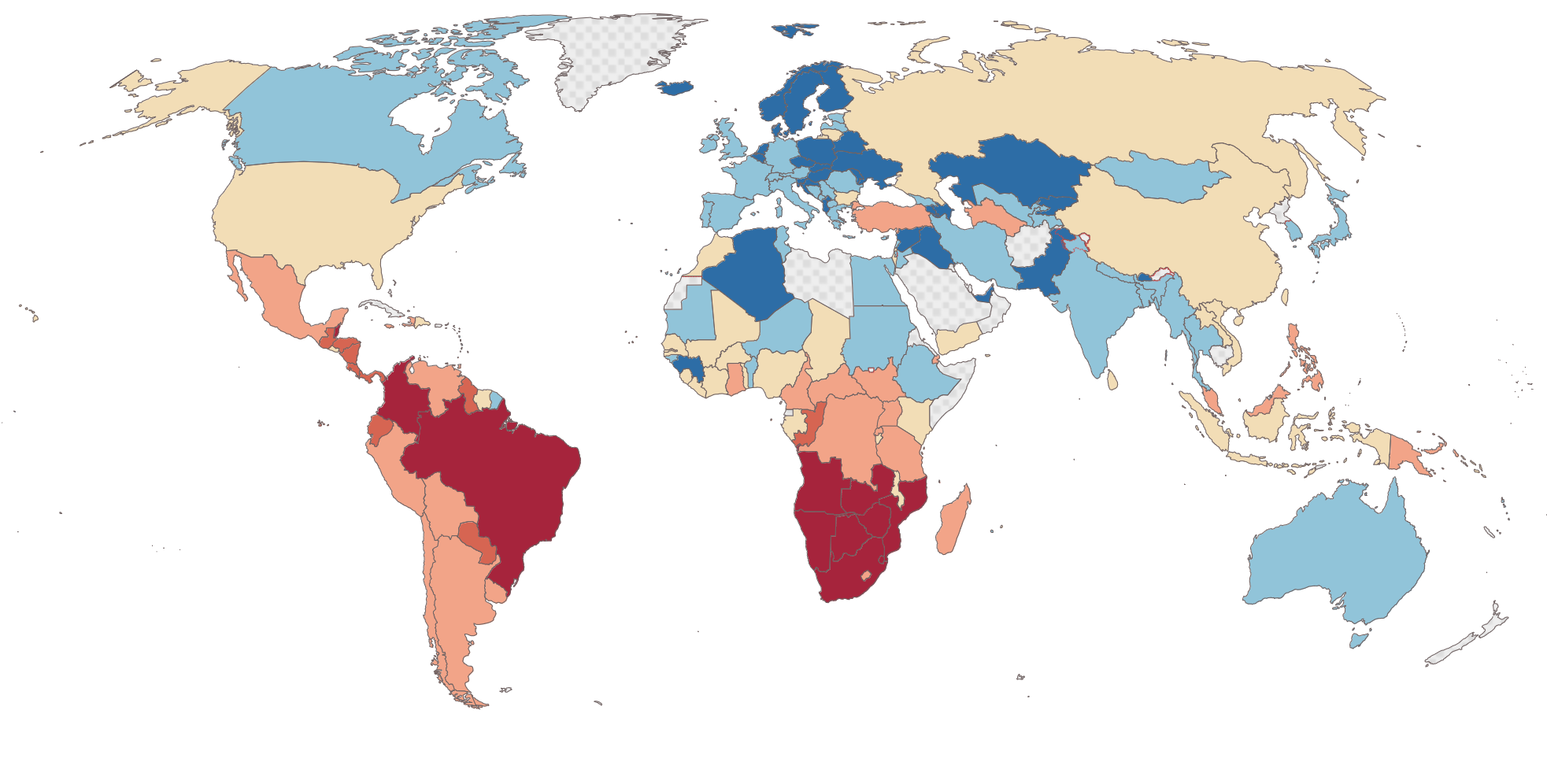
Global map of countries by high inequality (based on Gini index), 2022, according to the Poverty and Inequality Platform (PIP): <30; 30-35; 35-40; 40-45; 45-50; 50+

== Trends ==
Idealized hypothetical Kuznets curve

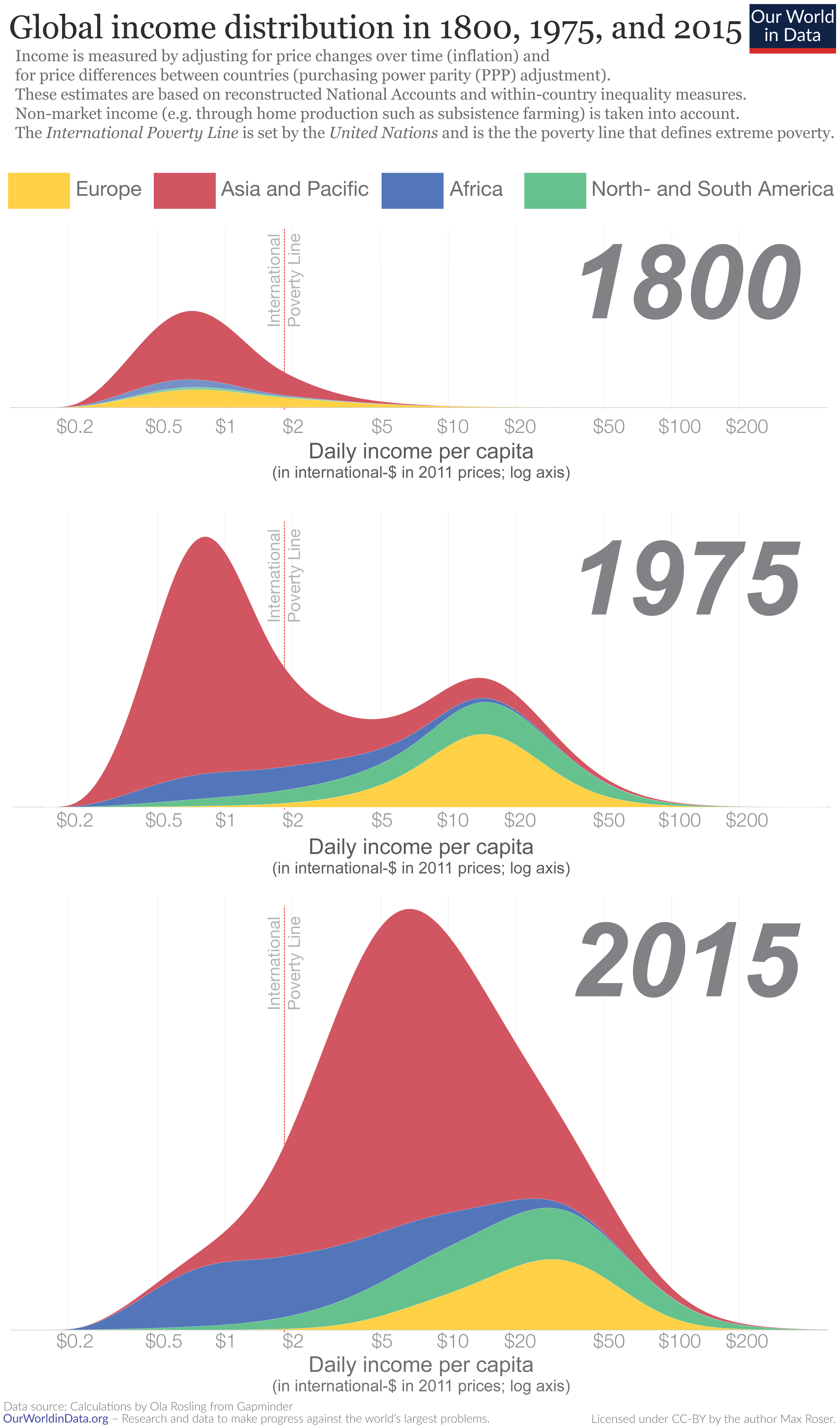
Global income distribution over time (Our World in Data). The chart shows a significant shift of incomes toward higher levels.

Standard economic theory stipulates that inequality tends to increase over time as a country develops, and to decrease as a certain average income is attained. This theory is commonly known as the Kuznets curve after Simon Kuznets. However, many prominent economists disagree with the need for inequality to increase as a country develops. Further, empirical data on the proclaimed subsequent decrease of inequality is conflicting.

Across the board, a number of industries are stratified across the genders. This is the result of a variety of factors. These include differences in education choices, preferred job and industry, work experience, number of hours worked, and breaks in employment (such as for bearing and raising children). Men also typically go into higher paid and higher risk jobs when compared to women. These factors result in 60% to 75% difference between men's and women's average aggregate wages or salaries, depending on the source. Various explanations for the remaining 25% to 40% have been suggested, including women's lower willingness and ability to negotiate salary and sexual discrimination. According to the European Commission direct discrimination only explains a small part of gender wage differences.

A study by the Brandeis University Institute on Assets and Social Policy which followed the same sets of families for 25 years found that there are vast differences in wealth across racial groups in the United States. The wealth gap between Caucasian and African-American families studied nearly tripled, from $85,000 in 1984 to $236,500 in 2009. The study concluded that factors contributing to the inequality included years of home ownership (27%), household income (20%), education (5%), and familial financial support and/or inheritance (5%). In an analysis of the American Opportunity Accounts Act, a bill to introduce Baby Bonds, Morningstar reported that by 2019 white families had more than seven times the wealth of the average Black family, according to the Survey of Consumer Finances.

There are two ways of looking at income inequality, within country inequality (intra-country inequality) – which is inequality within a nation; or between country inequality (inter-country inequality) which is inequality between countries.

According to intra-country inequality at least in the OECD countries, a May 2011 report by OECD stated that the gap between rich and poor within OECD countries (most of which are "high income" economies) "has reached its highest level for over 30 years, and governments must act quickly to tackle inequality".

Furthermore, increased inter-country income inequality over a long period is conclusive, with the Gini coefficient (using PPP exchange rate, unweighted by population) more than doubling between 1820 and the 1980s from .20 to .52 (Nolan 2009:63). However, scholars disagree about whether inter-country income inequality has increased (Milanovic 2011), remained relatively stable (Bourguignon and Morrisson 2002), or decreased (Sala-i-Martin, 2002) since 1980. What Milanovic (2005) calls the "mother of all inequality disputes" emphasizes this debate by using the same data on Gini coefficient from 1950 to 2000 and showing that when countries' GDP per capita incomes are unweighted by population income inequality increases, but when they are weighted inequality decreases. This has much to do with the recent average income rise in China and to some extent India, who represent almost two-fifths of the world. Notwithstanding, inter-country inequality is significant, for instance as a group the bottom 5% of US income distribution receives more income than over 68 percent of the world, and of the 60 million people that make up the top 1% of income distribution, 50 million of them are citizens of Western Europe, North America or Oceania (Milanovic 2011:116,156).

Larry Summers estimated in 2007 that the lower 80% of families were receiving $664 billion less income than they would be with a 1979 income distribution, or approximately $7,000 per family. Not receiving this income may have led many families to increase their debt burden, a significant factor in the 2007–2009 subprime mortgage crisis, as highly leveraged homeowners suffered a much larger reduction in their net worth during the crisis. Further, since lower income families tend to spend relatively more of their income than higher income families, shifting more of the income to wealthier families may slow economic growth.

In a TED presentation shown here , Hans Rosling presented the distribution and change in income distribution of various nations over the course of a few decades along with other factors such as child survival and fertility rate.

As of 2018, Albania has the smallest gap in wealth distribution with Zimbabwe having the largest gap in wealth distribution.

A 2025 study by BuchhaltungsButler and DataPulse Research estimated the annual net household income required for a household to belong to the top 10 percent of the income distribution in European countries, using data from Eurostat (EU-SILC 2024). The highest estimated threshold was recorded in Luxembourg, where a household required an annual net income of approximately €175,000 to fall within the top income decile. Other countries with comparatively high thresholds included Norway (about €133,000), Denmark (around €121,000), Austria (approximately €113,000), and Ireland (about €112,000). Lower thresholds were observed in southern and eastern Europe. For example, a household needed an estimated €70,000 in Italy and €67,000 in Spain to reach the top 10 percent. In Poland, the threshold was approximately €38,600, while in Greece it was around €32,900. The lowest estimated figures among the countries examined were reported for Bulgaria (about €21,900) and Turkey (approximately €19,300).

== Income distribution in different countries ==
=== Japan ===
Despite these issues, Japan's Gini coefficient—a measure of income inequality—remains lower than in many OECD countries. Still, the relative poverty rate highlights significant economic hardship among certain population segments. The government has responded with policies aimed at converting non-regular positions to regular ones, increasing the minimum wage, and enhancing social security for low-income families.

- Post-tax Gini coefficient: 0.32.
- Unemployment rate: 2.6%.
- GDP per capita: $40 850.
- Poverty rate: 15.7%

Addressing income inequality in Japan moving forward will require policies that tackle demographic challenges, ensure fair employment practices, and foster inclusive economic growth. Enhancing the social safety net and providing targeted assistance to vulnerable groups will be key to mitigating income inequality's impacts.

=== India ===
India's economy was growing rapidly in 2011, but a big section of the population was still living in poverty, making income disparity a serious problem.

Post-tax Gini coefficient: In 2011, India's estimated Gini coefficient ranged from 0.33 to 0.36, indicating moderate to high levels of income inequality.

Rate of unemployment: During this time, India's jobless rate was roughly 9%. GDP per capita: In 2011, the GDP per capita was approximately USD 1,500, indicating a significant income gap between developed countries and India.

Rate of poverty: In 2011, more than 20% of Indians were living below the country's poverty line, making it a high rate of poverty.

The Indian government put in place a number of measures to alleviate economic disparity, including:

The goal of social welfare initiatives like the Mahatma Gandhi National Rural Employment Guarantee Act (MGNREGA) is to provide jobs in rural areas. Public Distribution System (PDS) and other subsidized food programs help low-income households maintain food security. Economic changes like financial inclusion programs that give underprivileged people access to banking services in an effort to promote inclusive growth.

=== Thailand ===
Thailand has been ranked the world's third most unequal nation after Russia and India, with a widening gap between rich and poor according to Oxfam in 2016. A study by Thammasat University economist Duangmanee Laovakul in 2013 showed that the country's top 20 land owners owned 80 percent of the nation's land. The bottom 20 owned only 0.3 percent. Among those having bank deposits, 0.1 percent of bank accounts held 49 per cent of total bank deposits. As of 2019, Thai per capita income is US$8,000 a year. The government aims to raise it to US$15,000 (498,771 baht) per year, driven by average GDP growth of five to six percent. Under the 20-year national plan stretching out to 2036, the government intends to narrow the income disparity gap to 15 times, down from 20 times in 2018.

=== Australia ===
Australia was suffering from the global fallout from the 2008 financial crisis in 2011, but compared to many other industrialized countries, its economy remained comparatively strong, partly because of its solid mining industry and close trading relations with China.

Post-tax Gini coefficient: In 2011, Australia's Gini coefficient was roughly 0.33, showing a moderate degree of income inequality by global standards.

Rate of unemployment: In 2011, Australia's unemployment rate was 5.1%, which was consistent with a stable labor market.

GDP per capita: In 2011, the GDP per capita was approximately USD 62,000, indicating a robust economy.

Poverty rate: Various estimates place the poverty rate between 12 and 13 percent.

Australia's government prioritized resolving income inequities that were made worse by the global economic slump during this time, as well as maintaining economic stability. Among the measures taken to lessen income inequality were:

- Bolstering the social safety net by raising welfare payments.
- Introducing fiscal measures like progressive taxes that are intended to redistribute income. Encouraging work by taking steps to increase the number of jobs being created in different industries.

These measures were a part of Australia's larger strategy to guarantee that the country's economic expansion benefited all facets of society, especially in light of the unpredictability of the world economy.

=== United States ===
Income growth since 1970

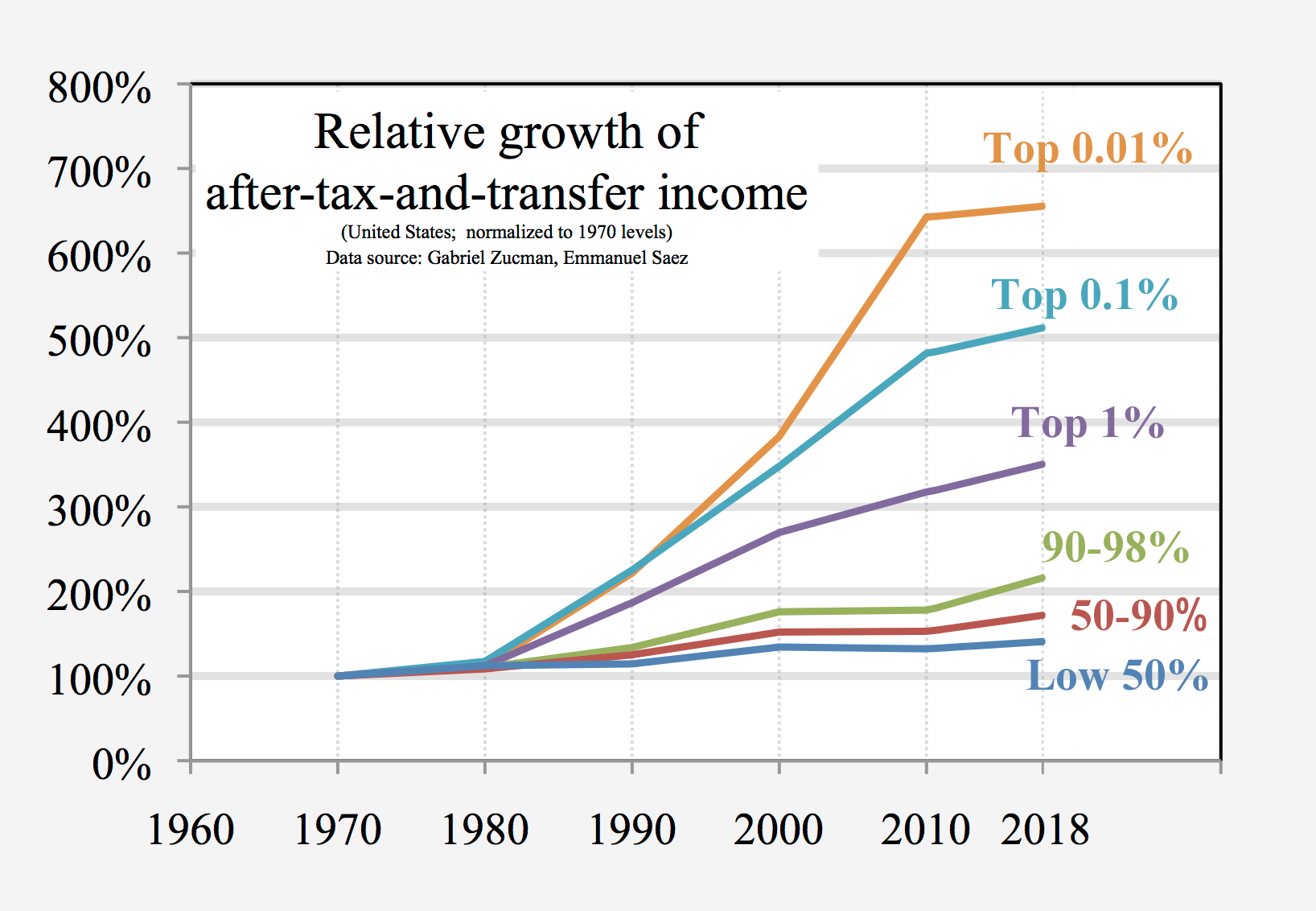
Relative income growth, organized by percentile classes, normalized to 1970 levels. Graph accounts for both income growth, and the hidden decline in the progressivity of the tax code at the top, the wealthiest earners having seen their effective tax rates steadily fall.

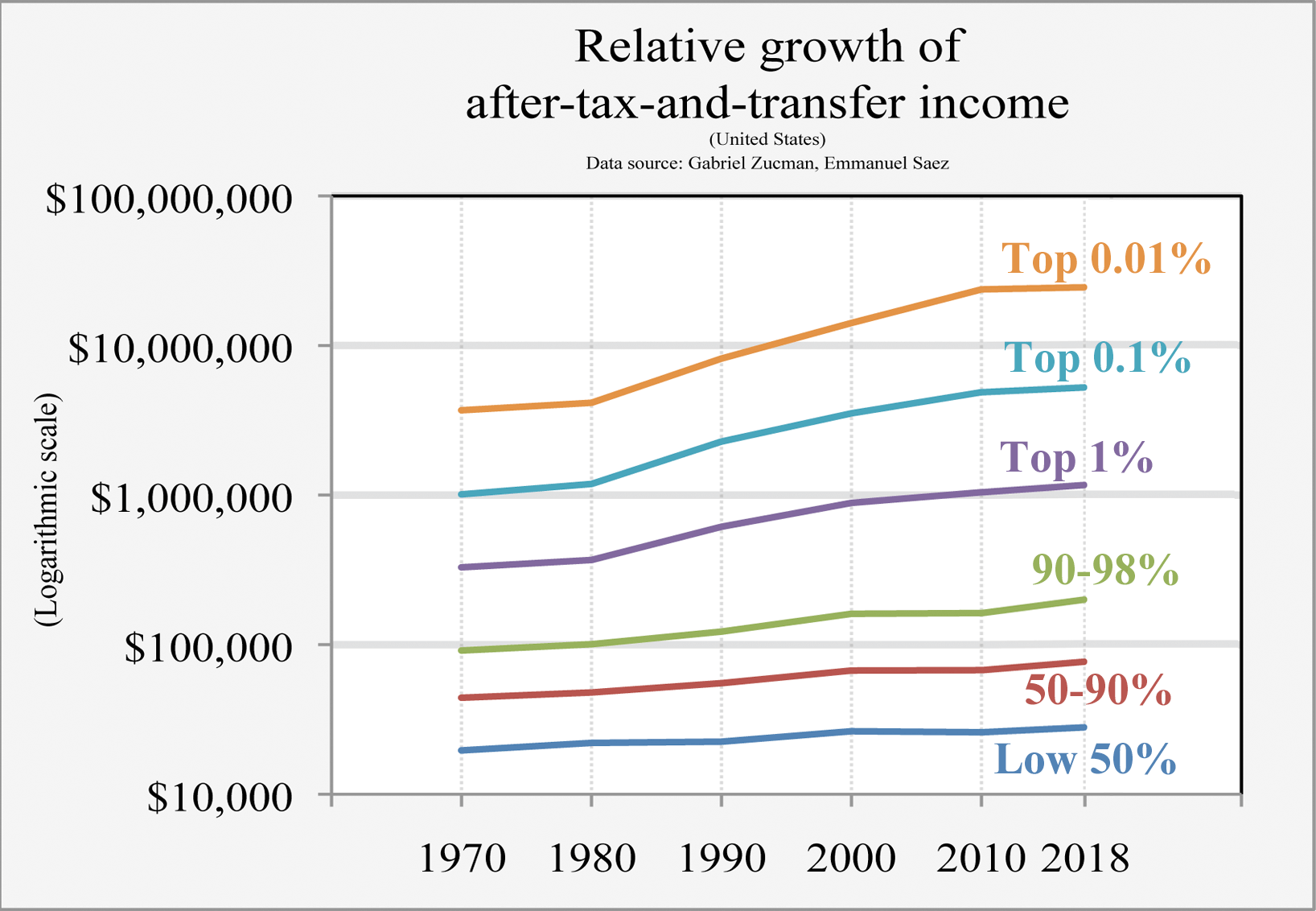
Same data as adjacent chart, but plotted on logarithmic scale to show absolute dollar amounts. Data shows a range of three orders of magnitude—a ~1000-fold difference.

2011: In the United States, income has become distributed more unequally over the past 30 years, with those in the top quintile (20 percent) earning more than the bottom 80 percent combined.

2019: The wealthiest 10% of American households control nearly 75% of household net worth.

- Post-tax Gini coefficient: 0.39.
- Unemployment rate: 4.4%.
- GDP per capita: $53 632.
- Poverty rate: 11.1%.

Low unemployment rate and high GDP are signs of the health of the U.S. economy. But there is almost 18% of people living below the poverty line and the Gini coefficient is quite high. That ranks the United States 9th income inequal in the world.

The U.S. has the highest level of income inequality in the Western world. When measured for all households, U.S. income inequality is comparable to other western countries before taxes and transfers, but is among the highest after taxes and transfers, meaning the U.S. shifts relatively less income from higher income households to lower income households. In 2016, average market income was $15,600 for the lowest quintile and $280,300 for the highest quintile. The degree of inequality accelerated within the top quintile, with the top 1% at $1.8 million, approximately 30 times the $59,300 income of the middle quintile.

The economic and political impacts of inequality may include slower GDP growth, reduced income mobility, higher poverty rates, greater usage of household debt leading to increased risk of financial crises, and political polarization. Causes of inequality may include executive compensation increasing relative to the average worker, financialization, greater industry concentration, lower unionization rates, lower effective tax rates on higher incomes, and technology changes that reward higher educational attainment.

Further Reading(s):

- Eisenbarth, A., Chen, Z.F. The evolution of wage inequality within local U.S. labor markets. J Labour Market Res 56, 2 (2022). https://doi.org/10.1186/s12651-022-00307-6

=== United Kingdom ===
Inequality in the UK has been very high in the past, and did not change much until the onset of industrialization. Incomes used to be remarkably concentrated pre-industrial evolution: up to 40% of total income went into the pockets of the richest 5%. In the more recent years income distribution is still an issue. The UK experienced a large increase in inequality during the 1980s—the incomes of the highest deciles increase while everyone else was stagnant. Uneven growth in the years leading up to 1991 meant further increases in inequality. Throughout the 1990s and 2000s, more even growth across the distribution meant little changes in inequality, with rising incomes for everybody. In sight of Brexit, there is more predicted income distribution discrepancies between wages.

2019: The United Kingdom was doing a lot to reduce one of the widest gaps between rich and poor citizens, which has led to it reaching 13th place in global income inequality rankings.

- Post-tax Gini coefficient: 0.35.
- Unemployment rate: 4.3%.
- GDP per capita: $39 425.
- Poverty rate: 11.1%.

=== Russia ===
- Post-tax Gini coefficient: 0.38.
- Unemployment rate: 5.2%.
- GDP per capita: $24 417.
- Poverty rate: NA.

Occupying the 11th place in the ranking of income inequality in the world. USA TODAY stated: "Russia has a Corruption Perceptions Index score of 28 – tied for the worst among OECD member states and affiliates and one of the lowest in the world. " The cause of the income gap are the close connections of Russian oligarchs and the government. Thanks to these relationships, oligarchs get lucrative business deals and earn more and more money.

=== South Africa ===
South Africa is well known for being one of the most unequal societies in the world. The first democratic elections in 1994 were promising in terms of equal opportunities and living standards for South African population, but a few decades later the inequality is still very high. For instance, the top decile's share of income rose from 47 percent in 1994 to 60 percent in 2008 and 65 percent in 2017. The share of the poorest half of the population fell from 13 percent to 9 percent to 6 percent. An explanation for this trend is that South Africa governs a dual economy splitting the country into two different section. One section is built around an advanced capitalist economy while the other one is highly underdeveloped and mostly filled by black South Africans, which further leads to racial division of local population. As a result, on average a black South African earns three times less than a white South African.

- Post-tax Gini coefficient: 0.62.
- Unemployment rate: 27.3%.
- GDP per capita: $12 287.
- Poverty rate: 26.6%.

The highest income inequality is in South Africa, based on 2019 data.

=== Brazil ===
Income distribution is typically higher in developing economies than in advanced economies. In most major emerging economies, income inequality rose over the past three decades (2016), namely in China, Russia, South Africa and India. Although some might argue, the Brazilian Institute of Statistics claims that from 2004 to 2014, income inequality in Brazil declined. The Gini coefficient for household per capita income has gone down from 0,54 to 0,49. This decline is due to boosted income of the poor by sustained economic growth and implementation of social policies, for example increase in minimum wage or targeted social programs. In particular, the Bolsa Família program, introduced by reelected president Luiz Inácio Lula da Silva, whose goal is to support families in need. Although criticized, this program has not only helped reduce income inequality, but also increased literacy and lower child labor and mortality. In addition, progressive taxation, as well as schooling, demographic changes, and labor market segmentation, contributed to reducing inequality.

Even though Brazil has managed to lower its income inequality, it is still very high compared to the rest of the world, with around half of the total income being concentrated among the richest 10 per cent, a little above a fifth among the top 1 per cent, and close to one tenth among the top 0.1 per cent.

- Gini coefficient: 0.52(2022)
- Unemployment rate: 8.032% (2024).
- GDP per capita: $17,827.6 (2022)
- Poverty rate: 1.4% (3,65$) (2023)

=== China ===
China is one the fastest growing economies in the world since its reform policies in late 1970s. However, this phenomenon is often accompanied by an increase in income inequality. China's Gini coefficient has risen from 0,31 to 0,491 between the years 1981 and 2008. The main reason for China's high Gini coefficient is an income gap between rural and urban household. The share of the urban–rural income gap in total income inequality increased by 10 per cent over the period 1995–2007, rising from 38 to 48%. In China, constraints on migration limit the extent to which rural residents can move to urban areas in search of higher incomes and thereby reduce the urban–rural income gap. Although the urbanization rate has more than doubled in last 50 years, the prosses is still decelerated by various institutional and social barriers. As a result the share of national income of China's top 10% wealthiest people is 41%.

- Gini coefficient: 0.371 (2020)
- Unemployment rate: 5.1% (2024)
- GDP per capita: $21,482.6 (2022)
- Poverty rate: 2% (3,65$) (2020)

=== Nordic countries ===
In the past, the income distribution in Nordic countries including Denmark, Sweden, Norway, Finland, and Iceland was renowned for being relatively low compared to the rest of the world. This is caused by a combination of factors such as progressive taxation, strong social welfare system, strong labor market institutions, and a culture of social cohesion which definitely contributes to them being notoriously the happiest in the world. Moreover, Nordic countries seem to be unaffected by the trends towards increasing inequality and higher unemployment observed in other countries, particularly the US and the UK Even though each of the Nordic countries have experienced temporarily rising income inequality, and they have all been affected by economic crises, they all shown a remarkable ability to recover and return to a persistent growth path and a stable relatively low income inequality.

The following data is for Denmark, Sweden, Norway, Finland and Iceland respectively

- Gini coefficient: 0.283 (2021), 0.298 (2021), 0.277 (2019), 0.277 (2021), 0.261 (2017)
- Unemployment rate: 4.892% (2024), 8.365% (2024), 3.8% (2024), 4.892% (2024), 3.383% (2024)
- GDP per capita: $77,953.7 (2022), $68,178.0 (2022), $121,259.2 (2022), $62,823.0 (2022), $71,840.1 (2022)
- Poverty rate: 0,2% (3,65$) (2021), 0,8% (3,65$) (2021), 0,3% (3,65$) (2019), 0% (3,65$) (2021), 0% (3,65$) (2017)

=== Czechia ===
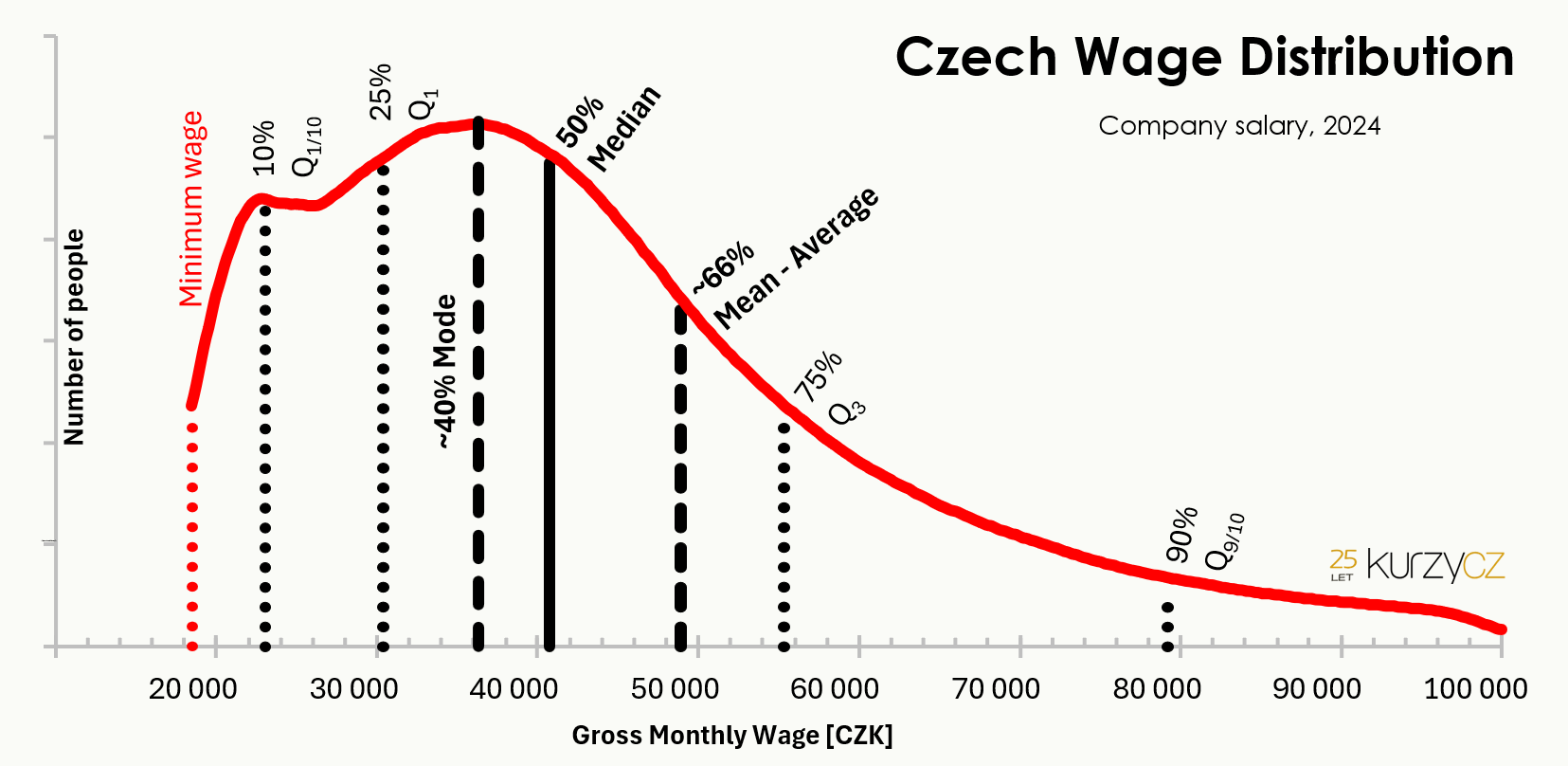
Czech wage distribution 2024

The Netherlands, Slovenia, and Czechia have the lowest rates of people at risk of poverty or social exclusion in the EU, with shares below 16.0%. The unemployment rate in Czech republic is projected to remain stable at 2.6% over the next two years, among the lowest in the EU. The minimum wage in Czechia is one of the lowest in the EU. 66% of employees in Czechia have a wage lower than the average wage.

== Development of income distribution as a stochastic process ==
It is difficult to create a realistic and not complicated theoretical model, because the forces determining the distribution of income (DoI) are varied and complex and they continuously interact and fluctuate.

In a model by Champernowne, the author assumes that the income scale is divided into an enumerable infinity of income ranges, which have uniform proportionate distribution. The development through time of the DoI between ranges is regarded to be a stochastic process. The income of any person in one year may depend on the income in the previous year and on a chance of progress. Assuming that to every "dying" income receiver, there is an heir to his or her income in the following year, and vice versa. This implies that the number of incomes is constant through time.

Under these assumptions any historical development of the DoI can be described by the following vectors and matrices.

- $X_r(0)$ ... number of the income receivers in range r = 1, 2, ... in the initial year $Y_0$
- $p'_{rs}(t)$ ... matrix, that contains proportions of the occupants of r-th range in the year $Y_t$ shifted to the s-th range in the following year $Y_{t+1}$

The vector of the DoI can be expressed as

$X_s(t+1)=\sum_{r=0}^\infty X_r(t) p'_{rs}(t).$

The elements of proportion matrices can be estimated from historical data.

== See also ==
- Decoupling of wages from productivity
- Gini coefficient
- Kinetic exchange models of markets
- Poverty
- Redistribution of wealth
- Subsidy
- Wage-price spiral
- Wealth distribution

United States:

- Affluence in the United States
- Income inequality in the United States
- Personal income in the United States
- Poverty in the United States
