= Odd Couple =

Odd Couple may refer to:

== Neil Simon play and its adaptations ==
- The Odd Couple (play), a 1965 stage play by Neil Simon
  - The Odd Couple (film), a 1968 film based on the play
    - The Odd Couple (1970 TV series), a 1970–1975 television show based on the film
      - The Oddball Couple, a 1975–1977 animated TV series
      - The New Odd Couple, a 1982–1983 sitcom remake
      - The Odd Couple (2015 TV series), a 2015 remake
    - The Odd Couple II, 1998 sequel to the 1968 film
  - The Female Odd Couple, a version adapted by Simon in 1985 with the gender roles reversed

== Other ==
- Odd Couple (1979 film), a Hong Kong martial arts comedy film
- Odd Couple (2022 film), an Indian Hindi-language film
- The Odd Couple (album), a 2008 album by Gnarls Barkley
- "Odd Couple", a song by Gen Hoshino
- "Odd Couples", episode of The Suite Life of Zack & Cody
- "Odd Couples", an episode of the Indian adaptation The Suite Life of Karan & Kabir
- "Odd Couple", episode of The Fairly OddParents

== See also ==
- Couple (disambiguation)
- "Really Odd Couple", episode of The Grim Adventures of Billy & Mandy
- Buddy film, a film genre featuring a mismatched pair of lead characters, sometimes described as an "odd couple" pairing
