= Decoupling (organizational studies) =

In organizational studies, and particularly new institutional theory, decoupling is the creation and maintenance of gaps between formal policies and actual organizational practices. Organizational researchers have documented decoupling in a variety of organizations, including schools, corporations, government agencies, police, and social movement organizations. Scholars have proposed a number of explanations for why organizations engage in decoupling. Some researchers have argued that decoupling enables organizations to gain legitimacy with their external members while simultaneously maintaining internal flexibility to address practical considerations. Other scholars have noted that decoupling may occur because it serves the interests of powerful organizational leaders, or because it allows organizational decision-makers to avoid implementing policies that conflict with their ideological beliefs. Recent research has also identified the reverse of decoupling: recoupling, the process whereby "policies and practices that were once decoupled may eventually become coupled."

Despite the emphasis in the literature on the decoupling between policies and practices, the phenomenon might also occur when organizations attempt to implement initiatives, but their results are far from what was initially expected. The so-called "means-ends" decoupling has received growing attention, especially in emerging institutional fields, such as sustainability.
