= Coupling (disambiguation) =

Coupling is a connection or joint between two things.

Coupling may also refer to:

== Technology ==
=== Science ===
- Coupling (physics), when two systems are interacting with each other
  - Rotational–vibrational coupling, occurring when rotation frequency of an object is close to or identical to a natural internal vibration frequency
  - Angular momentum coupling, the combining of quantized angular momentum (e.g., the interaction between two nuclei in nuclear magnetic resonance)
- Azo coupling, often called "coupling", an electrophilic substitution reaction
- Coupling reaction, reactions between hydrocarbon fragments in organic chemistry
- Coupling (genetics), a type of genetic linkage

=== Maths ===
- Coupling (probability), a proof technique in probability theory

=== Plumbing ===
- Coupling (piping), a short length of pipe or tube to connect two pipes or tubes together
- Hose coupling, a piece on the end of a hose to connect it to extra hoses or hose appliances

=== Audio ===
- Coupling track, a term in music recording for a B-side track
- Joint encoding, an audio compression technique in which the redundancy of information between audio channels is reduced; also commonly known as channel coupling or stereo coupling

=== Other technologies ===
- Coupling (computer programming), the degree to which each program module relies on each one of the other modules
- Coupling (electronics), the transfer of a signal from one medium or circuit block to another
- Railway coupling, a mechanism for connecting railway rolling stock

== Television ==
- Coupling (British TV series), a British sitcom written by Steven Moffat for the BBC
  - Coupling (American TV series), a short-lived American sitcom based on the British series
  - Coupling (Greek TV series), a short-lived Greek sitcom based on the British series

== Other uses ==
- Mating or the act of sexual intercourse
- Coupling, the distance formed by the lumbar vertebrae of a horse's back

== See also ==
- Decoupling (disambiguation)
- Coupling rod a device for connecting the driving wheels of a locomotive
- Couple (disambiguation)
- Coupler (disambiguation)
- Short-coupled (disambiguation)
- Uncouple (disambiguation)
