= Couplet (disambiguation) =

A couplet is a pair of lines in verse.

Couplet may also refer to:

- Couplets (cabaret), satirical or risqué entertainment songs
- Couplet (traffic), a pair of one-way streets which carry opposing directions of traffic
- "Couplet" (Angel), a 2002 episode of the television show Angel
- Philippe Couplet (1623–1693), Belgian Jesuit
- Heart arrhythmia, where a couplet refers to a pair of abnormal beats

== See also ==
- Couplet (Chinese poetry), a pair of lines of poetry which adhere to certain rules
