= List of The Odd Couple (2015 TV series) episodes =

The Odd Couple is an American multi-camera television sitcom that aired on CBS for three seasons from February 19, 2015 to January 30, 2017. It is the seventh screen production based on the 1965 play written by Neil Simon, following the 1968 film, a 1970 television series, a 1975 Saturday morning cartoon, a 1982 reboot of the 1970 series, The Odd Couple: Together Again (a TV film reunion of the 1970 series) and The Odd Couple II (a 1998 sequel to the 1968 film).

This show stars Matthew Perry (who also developed and executive produced the series) as the slovenly Oscar Madison and Thomas Lennon as the obsessively-tidy Felix Unger. Perry and Lennon had previously worked together on the film 17 Again. The show was announced in December 2013 and was picked up by CBS as a midseason offering for the 2014–15 season. The third and final season premiered on October 17, 2016 and contained 13 episodes.

38 episodes of The Odd Couple aired in all.

== Series overview ==
Season	Episodes	Originally released	
Season	Episodes	First released	Last released
1	12	February 19, 2015	May 14, 2015
2	13	April 7, 2016	May 23, 2016
3	13	October 17, 2016	January 30, 2017

== Episodes ==
=== Season 1 (2015) ===
No. overall	No. in season	Title	Directed by	Written by	Original release date	Prod. code	US viewers (millions)
1	1	"The Pilot"	Mark Cendrowski	Teleplay by : Danny Jacobson & Matthew Perry & Joe Keenan	February 19, 2015	102	13.57
Sportswriter and sports radio personality Oscar Madison, who is recently divorced, is about to hook up with neighbor Casey when he is visited by his old college pal, Felix Unger, whose wife has just thrown him out. Felix soon learns that his ex has hired a lawyer and plans to serve him with divorce papers. The neurotic, fussy Felix meets Casey's sister, the equally neurotic Emily, whose ex-husband left her for a man. Oscar plans a double date for the four of them, but Felix insists he won't be getting over his ex anytime soon. After viewing a slide show with Felix from their married days; however, it is Oscar who gets emotional and realizes he also is not fully over his break-up. Note: Actress Tracee Ellis Ross makes an uncredited cameo as the Angry Taxi Driver sitting outside of the restaurant.
2	2	"The Ghostwriter"	Phill Lewis	Lesley Wake Webster	February 26, 2015	105	11.08
Teddy reminds Oscar about his impending deadline to ghost write the autobiography for retired baseball star Marcus "Murph" Murphy. However, the deadline becomes threatened when Felix gets Murph to open up and make the book much more personal, including adding his childhood poems. Meanwhile, Felix enlists Dani's help on a photoshoot, while Emily lands a job at the tavern where the guys hang out.
3	3	"The Birthday Party"	Phill Lewis	Dan O'Shannon	March 5, 2015	101	12.36
It's Felix's birthday and Oscar has forgotten all about it. After lying to Casey about a surprise party for his friend in order to impress her, he rallies Dani, Teddy and Emily to throw Felix a last-minute party. Felix finds out there is a party, but promises to act surprised. During the party, Dani gives Felix a bird and Emily gives him a rare vacuum, but after an old friend asks him about what happened to his ex-wife Ashley (whom he met on his birthday), Felix sinks into a deep depression and leaves. Oscar finds Felix alone at the roller skating rink, where he and Ashley first met on that date 25 years ago, and convinces him to try to move on from Ashley.
4	4	"The Blind Leading the Blind Date"	Phill Lewis	Tucker Cawley	March 12, 2015	108	10.24
Oscar and Felix help Dani find a date for her class reunion following her recent breakup. While helping Dani meet people at the tavern, Oscar turns selfish and finds a date for himself. Thus, it falls upon Felix and his "scientific" methods to find a date for Dani. Oscar later finds out that his one night stand is a liar and a thief, and after Dani fails to connect with Felix's candidate, it is Oscar who finds the perfect person for her.
5	5	"The Wedding Deception"	Phill Lewis	Joe Keenan	April 2, 2015	103	8.70
Oscar and Felix receive an invitation to the wedding of their college friend. Oscar remembers wanting to hook up with the bride's sister, Olivia, back in college. Felix realizes that his ex-wife Ashley will be at the wedding and starts to panic. At Dani's suggestion, Felix brings Emily as his date to show Ashley he's moved on. During the reception, Ashley shows signs that she still cares about Felix and he misinterprets them, thinking she isn't over him. Oscar meets Olivia and she surprisingly says she had always hoped to hook up with him in college, too. Moments later, Felix announces that Emily is Oscar's fiancee, to show Ashley he's still available. Later, Olivia becomes convinced that Oscar and Felix are a gay couple.
6	6	"Heal Thyself"	Mark Cendrowski	Bob Daily	April 9, 2015	106	9.73
Felix convinces Oscar to go to the doctor after he comes down with an ear infection. Felix is known to everyone at the office of Dr. Sharon McManus. Oscar immediately falls for Sharon and asks her on a date. The first date goes well, but Sharon reveals that she wants to drop Felix as a patient because of his extreme hypochondria. Later, Felix is convinced that he has a rare Slovakian disease, while Oscar and Emily say he's being ridiculous. But Sharon then reveals, just as she and Oscar are about to make love, that the disease is in fact real and that she recently treated a Slovak patient, which causes Oscar to begin fearing the disease.
7	7	"Secret Agent Man"	Mark Cendrowski	Tony Dodds	April 16, 2015	109	9.62
Oscar receives news that Felix can get him on a televised sports roundtable show with Rich Eisen and Kenny Smith. Teddy thinks that it's a bad idea and recommends that Oscar stay with his radio show, but Felix convinces Oscar to do the television show and prove Teddy wrong. Emily and Dani help prepare Oscar as well. As the sports show unfolds, Oscar makes a fool of himself on live television. Teddy then tells Felix why he knows from past experience that Oscar shouldn't do live television, and he then quits as Oscar's agent. Back at the apartment, Felix patches up things and Teddy returns, even convincing Rich Eisen and Kenny Smith to appear on Oscar's radio program.
8	8	"The Unger Games"	Andy Cadiff	Tad Quill	April 23, 2015	110	9.37
After a softball game in which Felix gets the winning hit, Oscar becomes jealous of Felix's athletic skills and wants to prove that he is just as good as Felix is. The two engage in a decathlon to decide which one is the better athlete. Meanwhile, Dani thinks that Murph has feelings for Emily because Murph keeps buying Emily's handmade jewelry.
9	9	"Sleeping Dogs Lie"	Mark Cendrowski	Emily Cutler	April 30, 2015	104	9.16
Oscar gets woken up in the middle of the night by Felix sleepwalking. Oscar later tells Felix, and Felix realizes he needs his favorite pillow from his ex-wife's house. The two go to Ashley's house to retrieve the pillow, which is a success until Oscar finds a photo album of the couple's yearly camping trip that occurred a few months before Ashley threw out Felix. Oscar sees photos of Felix and Ashley, but also a different man with his ex-wife Gaby, and feels betrayed. Later, Oscar realizes he left his cell phone at Ashley's house, and while retrieving it he finds out she has a boyfriend.
10	10	"Enlightening Strikes"	Phill Lewis	Tucker Cawley & Emily Cutler	May 7, 2015	107	8.19
Felix guest instructs a yoga class and brings along Teddy, Emily and Murph to attend the class. During the session the people start to get irritated with Felix's forced teaching styles and walk out. Elsewhere, Oscar and Dani get trapped in the Subway and begin to get annoyed with the people on board. Weird Al Yankovic and Regis Philbin guest-star.
11	11	"Jealous Island"	Mark Cendrowski	Cindy Appel & Michael J. S. Murphy	May 7, 2015	112	7.03
Felix convinces Emily to join the Historical Society. During the first meeting, Felix's old nemesis shows up and charms Emily. Soon after, Felix begins to get jealous of his rival, annoying Emily when she deduces Felix is more mad that the guy is trying to usurp his role in the Society than trying to win her affection. Elsewhere, Oscar dates a woman who seems to be a good match for him, until he learns that the woman previously dated Murph. Oscar begins to get jealous of what she might have had in that relationship, and tries to start acting like Murph. Note: Brett Gelman, who previously worked with Matthew Perry in the short-lived NBC sitcom Go On, guest-starred in this episode.
12	12	"The Audit Couple"	Andy Cadiff	Dan O'Shannon	May 14, 2015	111	8.17
Oscar is audited by the IRS, but because the case is five years old, his ex-wife Gaby (Lauren Graham) also becomes involved. Felix realizes that he is likely responsible for the audit, after comparing his own attention to detail to Oscar's lack of same when Felix was meeting with an IRS agent. After helping Oscar and Gaby through their tax paperwork, Felix walks in on the couple reconnecting in the bedroom. Elsewhere, Dani convinces Emily to share her true feelings for Felix. It appears to work, as Oscar later walks in on Felix and Emily in bed. Later, Felix reveals to Oscar that he gave his name to the IRS.

=== Season 2 (2016) ===
No. overall	No. in season	Title	Directed by	Written by	Original release date	Prod. code	US viewers (millions)
13	1	"All About Eavesdropping"	Phill Lewis	Emily Cutler	April 7, 2016	201	7.63
Oscar and Felix eavesdrop on the couple living upstairs who constantly argue about their marriage troubles, and both men seek to advise the couple without revealing their eavesdropping. Meanwhile, Dani and Emily challenge themselves to do a race to the top of the Empire State Building.
14	2	"Unger the Influence"	Phill Lewis	Dan O'Shannon	April 14, 2016	203	7.10
With the help of Murph, Oscar decides to throw a big party when Felix finally agrees to spend the weekend sleeping over in Emily's apartment. Although Murph is game, neither Oscar nor Dani can party like they did in their younger days. Also, Felix and Emily discover they are incompatible when it comes to actually sleeping in the same bed.
15	3	"From Here to Maturity"	Mark Cendrowski	Tucker Cawley	April 21, 2016	204	8.64
To Felix's dismay, Oscar begins dating a much younger nanny named Allison whom he met in the building. Later, Oscar meets Allison's client, his upstairs neighbor Charlotte (guest star Teri Hatcher), who makes fun of him for dating a woman so much younger than he. Felix then convinces Oscar to break up with Allison and ask out Charlotte instead, but it backfires. Meanwhile, Emily is growing tired of always doing what Felix wants, so she asks for Dani's help in putting her foot down and insisting that Felix do something she likes.
16	4	"Madison & Son"	Mark Cendrowski	Bob Daily	April 28, 2016	211	8.16
When Oscar is invited to throw the ceremonial first pitch at a Mets game, Felix surprises him by inviting Oscar's estranged father, Walter (Garry Marshall), to attend the game.
17	5	"Oscar's Overture"	Beth McCarthy-Miller	Joe Port & Joe Wiseman	May 2, 2016	205	5.89
Oscar tries to impress Charlotte (Teri Hatcher) by purchasing a table at The New York Philharmonic fundraiser and asks Felix for his help. Meanwhile, Dani meets Teddy's wife, Diane (Sheryl Underwood), and celebrates her third anniversary working with Oscar.
18	6	"An Oscar Named Desire"	Katy Garretson	Emily Cutler & Neil Goldman & Garrett Donovan	May 5, 2016	209	8.07
Oscar seeks help from Felix about Charlotte, as he wants them to become intimate. Felix suggests they take things slow, much to Oscar's dismay. Charlotte also seeks advice from Dani about having sex for the first time since her divorce. Meanwhile, Felix tries to overcome his fear of dogs when he is forced to watch Emily's dog, Biscuit.
19	7	"Make Room for Dani"	Phill Lewis	Neil Goldman & Garrett Donovan	May 9, 2016	202	5.81
Teddy suggests that including Dani in Oscar's radio show might help Oscar outrank his main rival. Oscar reluctantly agrees, but becomes annoyed when Dani overshadows him. Meanwhile, Emily's mother (guest star Joanna Cassidy) refuses to meet Felix after he accidentally exposes himself while she and Emily are Skyping.
20	8	"A Dinner Engagement"	Victor Gonzalez	Ryan Raddatz	May 12, 2016	207	8.56
It is Emily's birthday, but she does not want to celebrate it because she claims that her birthday has been cursed. Much to her dismay, Felix throws a party for her anyway. Felix later sends out signals that he might propose. Meanwhile, Oscar meets Charlotte's son. Later, Oscar and Charlotte agree to "press pause" on their relationship for the sake of the child.
21	9	"Chess Nuts"	Katy Garretson	Michael J. S. Murphy & Frank O. Wolff	May 16, 2016	210	5.74
The apartment's doorman spills the beans that Oscar's ex-wife is still on the apartment lease, leading to the rescinding of their rent control and Oscar owing more than $10,000 in back rent. Later on, Oscar discovers that Felix used to play chess competitively, so he asks Felix to win his back rent for him.
22	10	"Odd Man Out"	Mark Cendrowski	Tony Dodds	May 19, 2016	206	7.26
Felix forces Emily and Oscar to spend more time together so they can become better friends, but Felix then becomes jealous when he finds out they have more in common than he realized. Meanwhile, Dani's air time on Oscar's show nets her the opportunity to do a commercial voice-over, so Teddy helps her with her first contract negotiation.
23	11	"Road Scholar"	Andy Fickman	Stephanie Furman Darrow	May 19, 2016	208	6.15
Felix decides to get his learner's permit to drive. He then asks everyone but Oscar to help him learn because he thinks that Oscar is a bad driver.
24	12	"All the Residents' Men"	Jeff Greenstein	Stephanie Furman Darrow & Tony Dodds	May 23, 2016	212	4.52
Felix and Oscar run against each other for President of the building tenants' association, but Oscar might be in over his head.
25	13	"The Ex-Factor"	Jeff Greenstein	Bob Daily & Ryan Raddatz	May 23, 2016	213	4.47
Felix encourages Oscar to go on a blind date following his break up from Charlotte and Oscar accidentally gets set up with Felix's ex-wife, Ashley. Meanwhile, Emily considers taking a jewelry design internship in London which will keep her and Felix apart for three months.

=== Season 3 (2016–17) ===
No. overall	No. in season	Title	Directed by	Written by	Original release date	Prod. code	US viewers (millions)
26	1	"London Calling"	Mark Cendrowski	Bob Daily	October 17, 2016	301	4.58
Felix begins to freak out when Emily announces that she is extending her stay in London for another month to prepare for a jewelry show in Paris. Meanwhile, Oscar seeks help from Teddy to plan a special three-month anniversary date for Charlotte, but Oscar is soon torn between planning his date and trying to help Felix.
27	2	"Food Fight"	Ted Wass	Tucker Cawley	October 24, 2016	302	4.87
The owner of Langford's (Fred Willard) announces that the bar is up for sale due to the declining number of customers. Felix offers assistance to help keep it in business, but this backfires when everyone hates his changes, leading to Oscar setting up his own bar in the apartment. Meanwhile, Emily has her first day back at work following her return from England.
28	3	"I Kid, You Not"	Pamela Fryman	Stephanie Furman Darrow	October 31, 2016	306	4.28
Although Halloween is a holiday he despises, Felix tries to prove he is open to change by hosting a "scary" historical tour of the building for some kids, enlisting help from Emily and Dani. At the same time, Oscar convinces Charlotte to let him take her son Evan trick-or-treating, even though she still doesn't think Oscar is very responsible. During Felix's tour, most of the kids find it boring and bail, causing Oscar to now have to find Evan. One child dressed as Albert Einstein stays with the tour, appearing to be a young clone of Felix. Felix sees this and convinces the kid that it's okay to enjoy childish things.
29	4	"Taffy Days"	Phill Lewis	Donick Cary & Ryan Raddatz & Stephanie Furman Darrow	November 7, 2016	309	5.02
Oscar decides to fulfill the last request of his late father Walter (played by Garry Marshall in season 2) and scatter his ashes in the river behind the candy factory that Walter once co-owned with his business partner Patty (Penny Marshall), even though Walter and Patty had not spoken to each other for over 30 years. Along the way, Oscar and Felix meet a number of characters played by Ron Howard, Marion Ross, Cindy Williams, Pam Dawber, Don Most, and Anson Williams.
30	5	"Miss England"	Jeff Greenstein	Emily Cutler	November 14, 2016	303	4.69
Teddy promotes Dani to a producer on Oscar's radio show and she is forced to hire Oscar's new assistant, but this later proves to be harder than Dani thought. Meanwhile, Felix tries to cheer up Emily when she reveals that she's missing England, but Emily later says she specifically liked the independence she had in England and wants to break up with Felix. Lesley Nicol (Mrs. Patmore of Downton Abbey fame) guest stars.
31	6	"Eisen Trouble"	Jeff Greenstein	Ryan Raddatz	November 21, 2016	304	4.58
After his arch enemy Rich Eisen receives a humanitarian award, Oscar is forced to give a speech and wants to roast him. Meanwhile, Felix tries to fast-forward through the five stages of grief following his breakup with Emily.
32	7	"The Odd Couples"	Ted Wass	Tom Hertz	November 28, 2016	305	4.61
Things get out of hand when Felix begins to meddle in his friends' personal lives and hires a counselor to help resolve their issues. Among the problems: Teddy's wife Diane believes that he is cheating on her with Dani after he stays out all night and Dani's moving in with Emily has created friction over the way the apartment is decorated.
33	8	"Felix Navidad"	Phill Lewis	Emily Cutler & Tony Dodds & Tom Hertz	December 12, 2016	310	5.23
Felix begins to go crazy when his mother Meredith (guest star Jessica Walter) visits for the holidays and he tries to impress her by perfectly carrying out their family Christmas traditions, but he later finds out that she has kept secrets from him. Meanwhile, Emily gets dragged in to work a holiday party at Langford's.
34	9	"My Bestfriend's Girl"	Phill Lewis	Donick Cary	January 2, 2017	307	5.33
Oscar asks Felix to hang out with Charlotte when it comes to attending high society activities he doesn't like. As they begin to go out constantly, Felix thinks he is growing feelings for Charlotte. Meanwhile, Emily recruits Dani, Oscar, Teddy, and Murph to make necklaces for her after a Macy's representative wants to buy a hundred of them, causing Emily to become a hostile boss as the deadline approaches.
35	10	"Should She Stay or Should She Go"	Phill Lewis	Tony Dodds	January 9, 2017	308	5.04
Felix takes the first step in moving on from Emily by picking up a bartender named Natasha (Busy Philipps) and bringing her home for the night. It later backfires when Felix doesn't know how to have a one-night stand; Natasha starts to get attached and won't leave. Meanwhile, Oscar takes his relationship with Charlotte to the next level by asking her to leave her toothbrush at his apartment, after which they get into a conversation about their relationship and say "I love you" to each other.
36	11	"Batman vs. The Penguin"	Mark Cendrowski	Frank O. Wolff & Michael J.S. Murphy & Dante Russo	January 16, 2017	311	5.61
Murph is hosting a new TV sports segment wherein Oscar is pitted against a penguin to pick the winners of hockey games. Oscar soon becomes the butt of jokes when the penguin's random picks (made by walking under one team logo or another) turn out to be more reliable than his. Elsewhere, Emily asks Felix to shoot photos of her for a jewelry website, but Felix misinterprets her verbal cues and thinks she wants to get back together with him.
37	12	"The God Couple"	Pamela Fryman	Kristi Korzec & Dan O'Shannon & Aaron Shure	January 30, 2017	312	5.78
Felix asks Oscar to go to church with him to support Dani as she sings lead in the gospel choir, but Felix's coaching taints an opportunity the choir soon receives to sing on TV. Meanwhile, Oscar is reluctant to go to church, but slowly begins to embrace it when he sees a work opportunity. Also, Emily has her first date following her breakup from Felix.
38	13	"Conscious Odd Coupling"	Pamela Fryman	Bob Daily & Tucker Cawley	January 30, 2017	313	5.30
After a huge fight, Felix and Oscar decide it's best to get new roommates. Oscar moves in with Charlotte after a romantic weekend together. Felix interviews candidates and selects Neil (Parvesh Cheena), who is exactly like him. Soon after, things start to backfire for both men. Oscar destroys Charlotte's kitchen when he tries to cook for her, which drives her crazy, and the two think it's best to go back to how things used to be. Neil begins to annoy Felix when he consistently outdoes Felix at his usual fussy tasks and then refuses to move out, citing his lease agreement. In the end, Felix and Oscar move back in together, but in an open apartment one floor higher, with the same layout as their old apartment.
