= Hydrant coupler =

a hydrant coupler.

A hydrant coupler is a type of aircraft fueling equipment which opens and allows fuel to flow through the hydrant cart into the aircraft. A hydrant coupler needs 60lbs of air pressure to open up the pit valve to allow the flow of fuel. Hydrant couplers run off a pressure fueling system consisting of fuel and air pressure.

== See also ==
- Aircraft fuel system
