= Decoupling (advertising) =

Decoupling, in advertising, occurs when services that were previously subcontracted by advertising agencies are purchased directly from suppliers.

Decoupling is part of the unbundling of the services previously provided by traditional full service advertising agencies, which originally began with the creation of standalone media buying agencies such as Zenith from Saatchi & Saatchi Group in the 1980s and Mindshare from WPP Group in the 1990s. For the same reasons as media (focus, economies of scale and dedicated software) press production and digital production are now increasingly handled by standalone production agencies, which trade direct with advertisers and not through their advertising agencies.
