= The Odd Couple (2015 TV series) =

American sitcom (2015–2017)

- Genre: Sitcom
- Based on: The Odd Couple by Neil Simon
- Developed by: Matthew Perry; Danny Jacobson; Joe Keenan
- Starring: Matthew Perry; Thomas Lennon; Lindsay Sloane; Yvette Nicole Brown; Wendell Pierce
- Theme music composer: Neal Hefti
- Composers: Bruce Miller; Jason Miller
- Country of origin: United States
- Original language: English
- No. of seasons: 3
- No. of episodes: 38 (list of episodes)

Production
- Executive producers: Matthew Perry; Eric Tannenbaum; Kim Tannenbaum; Sarah Timberman; Carl Beverly; Garry Marshall
- Camera setup: Multi-camera
- Running time: 21–22 minutes
- Production companies: The Tannenbaum Company; Timberman-Beverly Productions; CBS Television Studios

Original release
- Network: CBS
- Release: February 19, 2015 – January 30, 2017

Related
- The Odd Couple (film); The Odd Couple (1970 TV series); The Oddball Couple; The New Odd Couple; The Odd Couple II

The Odd Couple is an American sitcom television series that aired on CBS from February 19, 2015, to January 30, 2017. It was the seventh screen production based on the 1965 play written by Neil Simon, following the 1968 film, the original 1970s television series, a 1975 Saturday morning cartoon, a 1982 reboot of the 1970 series, The Odd Couple: Together Again (a TV film reunion of the 1970 series) and The Odd Couple II (a 1998 sequel to the 1968 film).

The show stars Matthew Perry, who also developed and executive produced the series, as the slovenly Oscar Madison and Thomas Lennon as the obsessively-tidy Felix Unger. Perry and Lennon had previously worked together on the film 17 Again. The show was announced in December 2013 and was picked up by CBS as a midseason offering for the 2014–15 season.

On May 16, 2016, CBS renewed the show for a third season of 13 episodes, which premiered on October 17, 2016, and concluded on January 30, 2017. The series was canceled on May 15, 2017, after three seasons and 38 episodes.

== Plot ==
Felix Unger and Oscar Madison meet at college in the late 1980s, and fate puts them together as roommates: while Felix is extremely neurotic and fussy in contrast to the slovenly and easy-going Oscar, they become friends quickly. They eventually marry two women very different from themselves (Felix gets hitched to the calm but feisty Ashley, and Oscar settles down with the insecure Gaby).

Years later, Felix, now a neat-freak news writer and photographer, is kicked out by Ashley after twenty years of marriage (having spent eight of them in marriage counseling, with Felix going alone for the last two years) and moves in with Oscar, now a sports talk show host, whose ex-wife Gaby has left him because he was a thoughtless slob.

Felix and Oscar attempt to date Casey and Emily, two sisters who are roommates in the same building, and who both have recently exited their own unhealthy relationships. Felix is pretty insecure as he still has feelings for Ashley, which contrasts with Oscar who claims to be better off away from his ex. However, Oscar later confesses to Felix that he is not over Gaby.

Oscar holds poker games regularly, with two of the players being Teddy, his agent, and Roy, one of his best friends.

== Episodes ==
Season	Episodes	Originally released	
Season	Episodes	First released	Last released
1	12	February 19, 2015	May 14, 2015
2	13	April 7, 2016	May 23, 2016
3	13	October 17, 2016	January 30, 2017

== Cast and characters ==
=== Main ===
- Matthew Perry as Oscar Madison: a sportswriter and sports talk radio personality. He is somewhat lazy and his apartment is usually a mess. Oscar and Felix clash immediately when Felix moves in and insists they keep the apartment clean and organized. Oscar runs a sports radio show from his apartment with his assistant Dani. He is initially a womanizer, having many one night stands until meeting Charlotte in Season 2.
- Thomas Lennon as Felix Unger: a professional photographer, Felix is a clean freak. He and Oscar clash with their different personalities. Felix also teaches yoga part-time. Felix and his wife Ashley begin a separation but later Ashley files for divorce. It is not until he starts a relationship with Emily that Felix can truly move on from Ashley.
- Yvette Nicole Brown as Danielle "Dani" Duncan: Oscar's assistant on his radio show who later becomes the series' producer. She has a very strong personality and often speaks her mind. Dani and Emily begin to hang out, and she encourages Emily to show her true feelings for Felix. Despite her useful knowledge of dating, Dani is chronically unsuccessful in her own dating life, and even seeks help from Oscar and Felix to find her the perfect date.
- Lindsay Sloane as Emily: the upstairs neighbor who is attracted to Felix. Emily works at the local bar but has a jewelry business that is her true passion. She is often down on herself and has low self-esteem when it comes to dating and her career.
- Wendell Pierce as Teddy: Oscar's agent and friend. Teddy continually finds Oscar work, often encouraging Oscar to do jobs he does not want to do for the sake of publicity. Teddy has a successful marriage, but also mentions that his wife can be domineering.

=== Recurring ===
- Leslie Bibb as Casey: Emily's sister who is a professional model. She has a brief fling with Oscar but later tells him that she wants to stay friends. Casey also sets up Emily on a date with Felix following his separation.
- Dave Foley as Roy: Oscar's friend who hangs out in the apartment and plays softball with Oscar. Seen only in the first season. He is often overlooked by Murph, even though they play next to each other in the outfield. Murph also can't remember Roy's name, which is a running gag during his appearances.
- Lauren Graham as Gaby: Oscar's ex-wife. She makes an appearance during the first-season finale when she and Oscar are audited by the IRS because of a comment Felix made during a meeting with an IRS agent. Oscar and Gaby get back together for a one-night stand, but Oscar wants to take things more slowly.
- Geoff Stults as Marcus "Murph" Murphy: Oscar's friend who is a former New York Mets player. He is a womanizer and amateur poet who appears to be absent-minded and often cannot remember people's names. Emily thinks he has a crush on her, but it turned out that Murph only wanted to buy Emily's jewelry for another woman.
- Christine Woods as Ashley: Felix's estranged wife. She announced that she was separating from Felix, and later on in the first season she files for divorce. She begins dating guys which makes Felix jealous.
- Teri Hatcher as Charlotte: a smart, successful single mother who lives in the building. Although she and Oscar initially clash when he dates her young nanny, she becomes Oscar's new love interest beginning in the second season. She is divorced and has one child.
- Sheryl Underwood as Diane: Teddy's wife. She is mentioned throughout the first season but makes her first appearance in the second season. She has a sarcastic sense of humor.

== Production ==
=== Development and filming ===
Matthew Perry was a fan of The Odd Couple, particularly the 1968 film version, which served as the main source of inspiration for the revived series. Perry had been pitching the idea to the networks since the late 2000s, expecting the show for 2010. However, executives passed on it, and Perry turned into another production, NBC's Go On which was cancelled after one season. Thereafter, Perry began concentrating on his pet project once again, being finally picked up by CBS in late 2013.

Perry and Danny Jacobson began developing the updated take on Neil Simon's original as a multi-camera comedy at the network. Perry and Jacobson co-wrote the CBS Television Studios-based half-hour, with Perry attached to play the Oscar role. Carl Beverly and Sarah Timberman of Timberman-Beverly Productions and Eric Tannenbaum and Kim Tannenbaum of The Tannenbaum Co. served as executive producers on the project, which had a penalty attached. On February 25, 2014, CBS ordered a pilot co-written by Perry and Joe Keenan. On May 9, 2014, CBS ordered the pilot to series for a 13-episode season scheduled for a mid-season premiere.

On May 11, 2015, the series was renewed for a second season of 13 episodes which premiered on April 7, 2016, and concluded on May 23, 2016.

On October 31, 2016, CBS announced that the fourth episode of the third season would pay tribute to the late Garry Marshall, creator of the original TV version in 1970. Marshall previously guest starred in the second season of the current series as Oscar's father, Walter. The series' third season concluded on January 30, 2017, with no additional episodes ordered.

On April 10, 2017, Matthew Perry tweeted, "My face on the Odd Couple stage door has been painted over with green paint. I think it's safe to assume that we have been cancelled. #subtle". On May 15, 2017, CBS officially cancelled the show after three seasons.

=== Casting ===
On February 28, 2014, Sarah Baker who previously worked with Perry on Go On was cast for a role for the pilot playing Oscar's assistant. On March 13, 2014, Thomas Lennon was cast opposite Perry as Felix. The Michael J. Fox Show star Wendell Pierce was cast as Teddy, a buddy partner for Oscar for the pilot on March 14, 2014. Georgia King was cast as a female lead on March 17, 2014. Lindsay Sloane was cast for the pilot on March 21, 2014. Following the series order, both Baker and King dropped out and subsequently the network was recasting the roles as of May 13, 2014. On August 8, 2014, it was announced that Yvette Nicole Brown was cast to succeed Baker as Oscar's assistant Dani – though the role had been downgraded to recurring to allow for her role on the upcoming season of Community. However shortly after announcing on August 30, 2014, that she was leaving Community due to a family emergency, she was upgraded to a series regular role on October 6, 2014. On September 10, 2015, it was announced that Teri Hatcher was cast as a recurring character named Charlotte, who's a new love interest for Oscar.

== Broadcast ==
The series debuted simultaneously in Canada on CTV. In Australia, Network Ten acquired the rights to air the series and premiered it at 7:30 pm on March 23, 2015.

== Home media ==
The first season of The Odd Couple was released on DVD on April 5, 2016. The second and third seasons were individually released on October 24, 2018, via Amazon.

Release date	Ep #	DVD name
August 2, 2016	12	The Odd Couple Season One
October 14, 2018	13	The Odd Couple Season Two
October 14, 2018	13	The Odd Couple Season Three

== Reception ==
=== Critical reception ===
The Odd Couple has received mixed reviews from critics. On Metacritic, season one has a score of 42 out of 100, based on 31 critics, indicating "mixed or average reviews". On Rotten Tomatoes, 26% of 35 critics' reviews from season one were positive with the consensus, "Stars Matthew Perry and Thomas Lennon make a fine Oscar and Felix, but The Odd Couple's flat jokes and canned laughter are pretty old hat."

=== Controversy ===
The third episode of the second season, "From Here to Maturity", was criticized by many Bosniak communities in Europe and North America. In the episode, Felix (Thomas Lennon) asks Emily (Lindsay Sloane) on a date by saying, "Let's go visit that new Serbian restaurant, The Taste of Srebrenica." The line seemed to reference the 1995 Srebrenica massacre, in which 8,000 young Bosniak men and boys were systematically rounded up and killed by the Bosnian Serb Army.

In an open letter, Eldin Elezovic, president of the Congress of North American Bosniaks stated that the Congress felt "very disturbed and disappointed" by the joke. He further said the show's line was analogous to saying something as horrendous as 'Let's go visit that new German restaurant, The taste of Auschwitz'." Almir Seckanovic of Faktor said the joke was "the most primitive way" to insult Srebrenica victims; Branka Antic Stauber, who runs a non-governmental organization that works with Bosniak women who were raped during the war, called the joke "inhumane"; and the Ontario-based research organization The Institute of Research of Genocide Canada, called the joke a "terrible humiliation of the victims of Srebrenica".

On May 10, 2016, the show's executive producer, Bob Daily, apologized for the line, saying, "We were unaware of any connection to the terrible tragedy in Srebrenica. We would never intentionally disrespect or make light of such an event and sincerely apologize to anyone we may have offended."

=== Ratings ===
Season	Time slot (ET)	No. of episodes	Premiered		Ended		TV season	Rank	Viewers (in millions)
Season	Time slot (ET)	No. of episodes	Date	Viewers (in millions)	Date	Viewers (in millions)	TV season	Rank	Viewers (in millions)
1	Thursday 8:30 pm	12	February 19, 2015	13.57	May 14, 2015	8.17	2014–15	32	11.28
2	Thursday 8:30 pm Monday 9:30 pm	13	April 7, 2016	7.63	May 23, 2016	4.47	2015–16	49	8.57
3	Monday 9:30 pm	13	October 17, 2016	4.58	January 30, 2017	5.30	2016–17	72	6.00

=== Accolades ===
Year	Association	Category	Nominee(s)	Result	Refs
2016	42nd People's Choice Awards	Favorite Comedic TV Actor	Matthew Perry	Nominated	
2017	43rd People's Choice Awards	Favorite Comedic TV Actor	Matthew Perry	Nominated	
