= Decoupling and re-coupling =

In economics, decoupling and re-coupling is where countries are no longer economically impacted by the economies of other countries and visa versa. A financial crises is typified by the decoupling hypothesis that, in 2007, held that Latin American and Asian economies, especially emerging ones, had broadened and deepened to the point that they no longer depended on the United States economy for growth, leaving them insulated from a slowdown there, even a fully fledged recession.

Faith in the concept had generated strong outperformance for stocks outside the United States. However, over the course of 2008, as fears of recession mounted in the United States, worldwide stock markets declined heavily. Contrary to the decoupling hypothesis, the losses were greater outside the United States, with the worst experienced in emerging markets and developed economies like Germany and Japan. Exports make up especially large portions of economic activity in those places, but that fact was not supposed to matter anymore in a decoupled world because domestic activity was thought to be so robust. On the other hand, after the slump the emerging countries experienced a strong recovery, much stronger than that in advanced economies.

Since 2017 the expression has also been used for an ongoing, partial technological decoupling between the United States and China. Washington has placed more than 1,000 Chinese firms on export control or investment blacklists and, via the 2022 CHIPS and Science Act, reserved US $54 billion to reshore advanced-semiconductor production. Current policy aims to “selectively” sever high-technology supply-chains that are deemed sensitive for national security, while leaving most trade in ordinary goods intact. Independent estimates for a full U.S.–China economic split suggest annual U.S. output losses of up to US $738 billion and the risk of the world economy bifurcating into two rival tech blocs.

The classic explanation for both decoupling and subsequent re-coupling holds that an initial crisis cuts global demand for capital and commodities, easing financial conditions for still-healthy regions; once lenders begin to absorb significant losses they tighten credit globally, transmitting the shock more widely. The modern U.S.–China episode adds a strategic dimension: governments can actively deepen or reverse decoupling through export controls, investment screening and industrial subsidies.

The phenomenon of decoupling and re-coupling has been explained by observing that global demand for factors such as capital and raw material declines when one part of the world economy suffers a crisis, which benefits the remaining healthy parts of the world economy through lower interest rates and lower commodity prices. However, once the crisis reaches the stage where global lenders suffer significant losses, they will cut back on their loan supply and interest rates for everybody will rise.

== See also ==
- 1997 Asian financial crisis
- Eco-economic decoupling
- Decoupling of wages from productivity
- Systemic risk
