= Aircraft fuel system =

Engine fuel systems in aircraft

An aircraft fuel system allows the crew to pump, manage, and deliver aviation fuel to the propulsion system and auxiliary power unit (APU) of an aircraft. Fuel systems differ greatly due to different performance of the aircraft in which they are installed. A single-engine piston aircraft has a simple fuel system, while a tanker (such as the KC-135) not only manages its own fuel but can also provide fuel to other aircraft.

Fuel is piped through fuel lines to a fuel control valve (usually known as the fuel selector). This valve serves several functions. The first function is to act as a fuel shut-off valve. This is required to provide the crew with a means to prevent fuel reaching the engine in case of an engine fire. The second function is to allow the pilot to choose which tank feeds the engine. Many aircraft have the left tank and right tank selections available to the pilot. Some Cessna airplanes feed only from both tanks; and many have the option to feed from left, right, or both tanks. The reason to have left only and right only options is to allow pilots to balance fuel load to reduce the banking moment. In some aircraft, the shut-off function is a different valve located after the fuel selector valve.

Typically, after the selector valve—situated at a low point in the fuel run—there is a gascolator — a fuel filter that can be opened on the ground and drained of fuel impurities denser than petroleum, mainly water and sediment. Other drainage points are in each tank (often more than one contaminant collection sump per tank) and at the injection pump.

Each tank is vented (or pressurised) to allow air into the tank to take the place of burned fuel; otherwise, the tank would be in negative pressure which would result in engine fuel starvation. A vent also allows for changes in atmospheric pressure and temperature.

== Single-engine aircraft gasoline fuel system ==
The fuel level indication system in the simplest form is a transparent window on the tank side and in its usual application a float-driven potentiometer installed in the tank. After the TWA Flight 800 disaster, a revision was made to aircraft fuel systems to address the potential explosion hazard of electrical components located in the fuel tank. Single-engine piston aircraft fuel level systems moved to utilize float level gauges from the CNG and LPG industries which had the float drive a magnetic coupling and relocated the potentiometer outside the fuel tank.

Some single-engine aircraft use capacitive probes in the fuel tanks. As fuel is burned, more air enters the tank and the capacitance decreases; this is read by a computer and the fuel amount is calculated and displayed to the pilots.

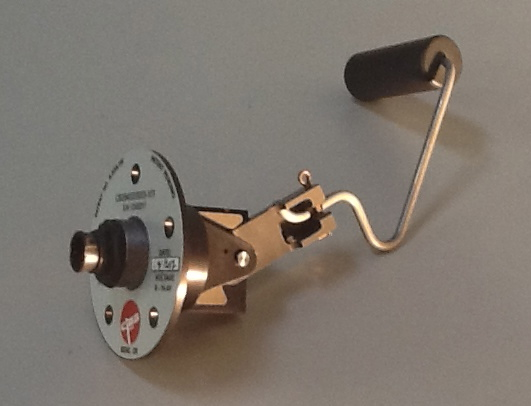
Magneto Resistive Level Sensor

Recent advances in magnetoresistive technology have evolved new fuel level sensors for general aviation applications. This system is not affected by any additive or fuel combination to replace 100LL for piston-powered aircraft.

Single-engine light aircraft fuel tanks are usually in the wings, but some aircraft have a small "header tank" between the normal fuel tank and the engine, to facilitate reliable fuel flow to the engine. On many small or very old single-engine aircraft, header tanks (and even main tanks) are often mounted above and/or immediately behind the engine. A few (particularly ultralight aircraft) have them in the fuselage or on the airframe behind the pilot and/or passenger(s).

== Multi-engine aircraft fuel system ==
Adding tanks and engines increases the complexity of the fuel system and its management. Additional features found in multi-engine aircraft are:

- Each wing tank often has its own electric boost fuel pump, and each engine has its own mechanical pump, replicating the fuel system described above for the single engine.
- In case of single-engine operation, there is often a method incorporated to "cross-feed" the engine (left tank feeding right engine, or vice versa).
- To balance asymmetric weight, flow valves and pumps often are used to feed both engines from one tank or simply to transfer fuel between tanks.

== Turbine fuel system ==
All of the considerations made for the twin piston are applicable to turbine fuel systems. Additional consideration apply because of the higher altitudes, different fuel, lower temperatures, and longer flights.

To avoid water condensation or the fuel itself solidifying at low temperatures (−55 °C), fuel tanks have thermometers and heating systems. Many are pressurized with engine bleed air to keep moist air out and ensure positive pressure feed to the pumps. In larger aircraft, fuel tanks also are in the fuselage and their load affects the center of gravity of the aircraft. This imposes limitations on the amount of fuel carried and the order in which fuel must be used. Turbine engines burn fuel faster than reciprocating engines do. Because fuel needs to be injected in to a combustor, the injection system of a turbine aircraft must provide fuel at higher pressure and flow compared to that for a piston engine aircraft.

The refueling system of larger aircraft includes a single positive pressure refueling point from which all tanks can be fueled. How much and to which tanks fuel is fed during refueling operations is determined by the controls in the refueling panel, usually installed nearby and accessible to ground crews.

== External tanks ==
External tanks are used to extend the range of an aircraft. Drop tanks are used by combat aircraft that need to discard them after use for performance reasons. A fuel pump is required to transfer fuel from a tip tank to a main tank.

== See also ==
- Hydrant coupler
