= Uncoupling (neuropsychopharmacology) =

Concept in neuropsychopharmacology

In neuropsychopharmacology, uncoupling, also known as decoupling, refers to the separation, shifting, or internalization of the brain's receptors (signal receivers) or ligands (signal senders) due to long-term exposure to mind-altering drugs or toxins, as the brain adapts through drug tolerance.

For example, prolonged use of opioids like morphine can lead to uncoupling of opioid receptors, reducing their responsiveness over time.
