= Decoupling of wages from productivity =

End of the historical linkage between gross national product and wages

The decoupling of median wages from productivity, sometimes known as the great decoupling, is the gap between the growth rate of median income and the growth rate of GDP per person or productivity. Erik Brynjolfsson and Andrew McAfee highlighted this problem toward the end of the twentieth century and the beginning of the twenty-first century. This problem furthermore leads to wage stagnation for the median despite continued economic growth overall. Mathematically, if inequality grows, then top incomes and total income can increase even if median income is relatively stagnant.

A number of causes have been hypothesized, including advances in technology (such as automation), globalization, neoliberal reforms, self-employment and wage inequality. Some commentators argue that some or all of the Great Decoupling can be explained as the product of faulty assumptions about the underlying economics.

== Background ==
Average wages (solid line) vs GDP per hour worked (dotted line) in the G7 from 1990 to 2020

On average across 24 OECD countries, there has been significant decoupling of real median wage growth from productivity growth over the past two decades. There have been large cross-country differences, both in overall decoupling and the extent to which it has gone together with real median wage stagnation. In a number of countries with above-average productivity growth, such as Korea, Poland or the Slovak Republic, real median wages have grown well above the OECD average despite significant wage-productivity decoupling. However, where productivity growth has been around or below the OECD average, such as in Canada, Japan and the United States, decoupling has been associated with near-stagnation of real median wages. In about a third of the covered OECD countries, real median wages have grown at similar or even higher rates than labour productivity. In some countries, such as the Czech Republic or Sweden, this has been associated with above-average real median wage growth, but in some others with below-average productivity growth, including Italy and Spain, real median wages have nonetheless grown at very low rates.

There have also been large differences in the relative contributions of labour shares and wage inequality to overall decoupling, suggesting that country-specific factors matter, including labour and product market policies and the level and distribution of skills in the population. For instance, in the United States around half of the decoupling (0.6 percentage points of 1.3 percentage points) is explained by the decline in the labour share while it explains virtually all decoupling in Japan.

The aggregate decoupling of median wages from productivity partly reflects declines in labour shares at the technological frontier (defined as the top 5% of firms in terms of labour productivity within each country group in each industry and year). In countries where aggregate labour shares have declined, the decoupling of real wages from productivity has been particularly pronounced in firms at the technological frontier. This could indicate the presence of "winner-takes-most" dynamics, as frontier firms take advantage of technology or globalisation-related increases in economies of scale and scope to reduce the share of fixed labour costs in value-added (e.g. related to research and development, product design or marketing) and/or again a dominant position that allows them to raise their mark-ups. By contrast, there has been no such decoupling of real wages from productivity in frontier firms in countries where labour shares have increased.

== Causes ==
=== Technological change ===
- Technology-driven declines in investment prices reduce the labour share. On average across industries, a decline in investment prices relative to value-added prices of 9% – which is around the average decline in relative investment prices observed over the period 1995–2013 in the OECD – reduces the labour share by approximately 1.7 percentage points. This may be due to technological progress having become more labour displacing over time, with particularly large labour-displacing effects in the 2000s.
- On the one hand, new technology extends the range of existing tasks that can be carried out by machines, thereby displacing workers and reducing the labour share. On the other hand, new technology also creates new tasks that cannot be carried out by machines. As the nature of technological progress changes, the balance between labour displacement and task creation from new technologies may shift. In particular, information and communication technologies (ICT) may have shifted the balance towards labour displacement and facilitated the emergence of "superstar" firms with very low labour shares.
- Technological change also appears to contribute to rising wage inequality. With given endowments of low and high-skilled labour (whose stock can be adjusted only slowly over time), technological change can raise wage inequality if it complements high-skilled workers but substitutes for low-skilled workers. Consistent with this hypothesis, the ratio of R&D spending to GDP is positively associated with wage inequality at the aggregate level and digitalisation is positively associated with higher wage dispersion between firms.

=== Expansion of global value chains ===
Recent OECD analysis further suggests that global value chain expansion has compressed labour shares. Indeed, an increase in global value chain participation of 10 percentage points of value added reduces the labour share by 1 percentage point. Given that the average increase in global value chain participation observed in the OECD over 1995–2013 was around 6 percentage points of value added, this suggests that on average across countries the expansion of global value chains reduced the labour share by 0.6 percentage points. With the caveat that global value chain expansion is unlikely to be independent of technological change, quantitatively its effect appears to be only around a third of that from declines in relative investment prices. Trade integration also appears to play a role in increased wage inequality. At the aggregate level, the ratio of median to average wages is negatively associated with value added imports, especially from China. This could reflect the fact that increased trade integration with China has reduced labour demand more among low-skilled workers than among high-skilled workers.

Evidence from micro-aggregated data further suggests that between-firm wage dispersion increased in sectors that became more open to trade. Overall, the empirical evidence based on a variety of data sources and methodologies consistently suggests that technological change and increased trade integration have contributed to the decoupling of median wages from productivity, both by lowering labour shares and raising wage inequality. This does not imply that technological change and increased trade integration harm workers, since a large body of evidence suggests that these developments raise aggregate productivity, including through efficiency-enhancing reallocation, reduce prices and expand the range of available products. However, it raises the question of how public policies can contribute to the broader sharing of the productivity gains from technological change and increased trade integration.

== Role of public policies and institutions ==
Public policies play a key role in ensuring that productivity gains from technological change and global value chain expansion are broadly shared with workers. Based on several recent OECD studies, a number of key findings emerge. In particular, enhancing and preserving workers’ skills is crucial not only for raising productivity growth but also for promoting a broader sharing of productivity gains, both by supporting wages at the bottom of the wage distribution and raising labour shares. By contrast, a number of other policies that tend to raise productivity growth can have conflicting effects on labour shares and wage inequality, with the relative size of these effects likely to depend on initial policy settings.

== See also ==
- Wage growth
- Real wages § Trends and wage stagnation
- Economic growth
