= Chlordiazepoxide =

Benzodiazepine medication

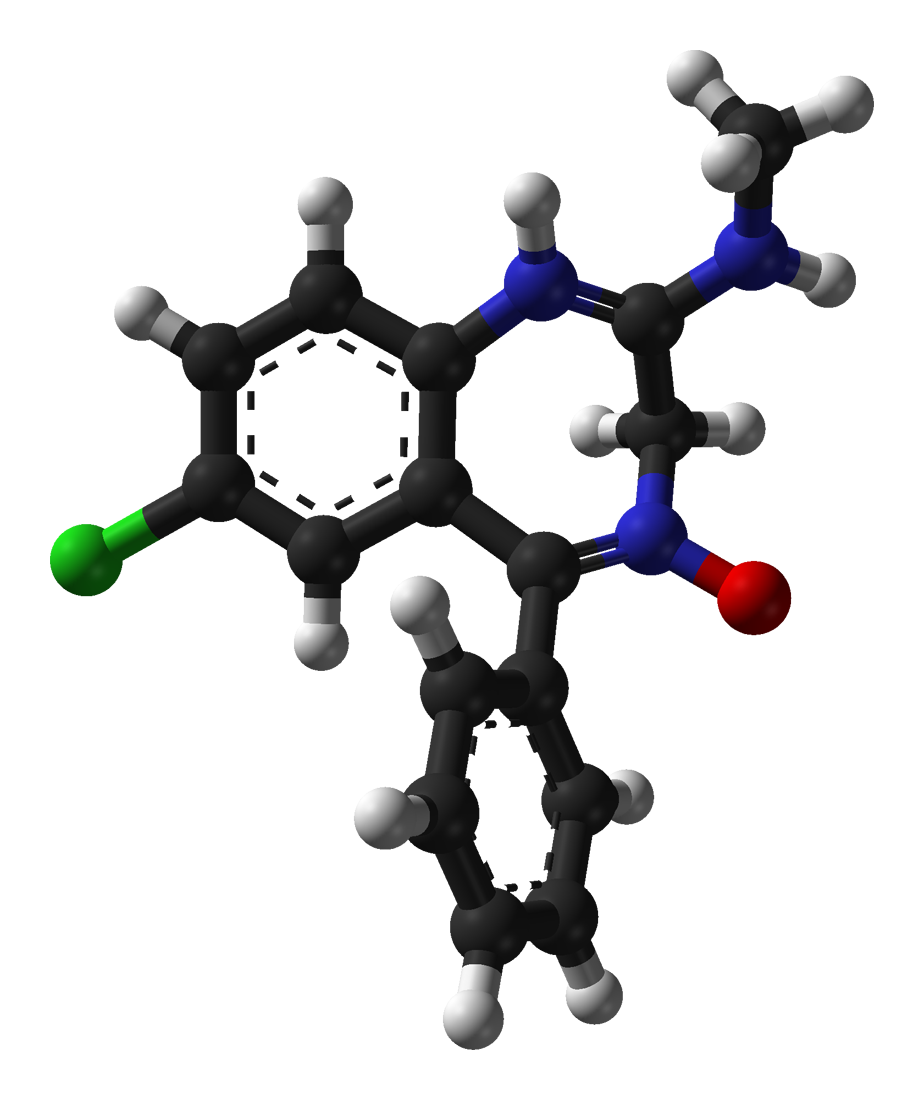

Clinical data
- Pronunciation: /ˌklɔːrdaɪ.əzɪˈpɒksaɪd/
- Trade names: Librium
- AHFS/Drugs.com: Monograph
- MedlinePlus: a682078
- Dependence liability: High
- Addiction liability: Moderate
- Routes of administration: By mouth, intramuscular
- Drug class: Benzodiazepine
- ATC code: N05BA02 (WHO)

Legal status
- Legal status: AU: S4 (Prescription only); BR: Class B1 (Psychoactive drugs); CA: Schedule IV; DE: Prescription only (Anlage III for higher doses); UK: Class C; US: Schedule IV; SE: Förteckning IV In general: ℞ (Prescription only)

Pharmacokinetic data
- Metabolism: Liver
- Metabolites: • Desmethyldiazepam; Desmethylchlordiazepoxide • Demoxepam • Oxazepam
- Elimination half-life: 5–30 hours (Active metabolite desmethyldiazepam 36–200 hours; other active metabolites include oxazepam)
- Excretion: Kidney

Identifiers
- IUPAC name: 7-Chloro-2-(methylamino)-5-phenyl-3H-1,4-benzodiazepine-4-oxide
- CAS Number: 58-25-3
- PubChem CID: 2712
- IUPHAR/BPS: 3370
- DrugBank: DB00475
- ChemSpider: 10248513
- UNII: 6RZ6XEZ3CR
- KEGG: D00267
- ChEBI: CHEBI:3611
- ChEMBL: ChEMBL451
- CompTox Dashboard (EPA): DTXSID4046022
- ECHA InfoCard: 100.000.337

Chemical and physical data
- Formula: C_{16}H_{14}ClN_{3}O
- Molar mass: 299.76 g·mol^{−1}
- 3D model (JSmol): Interactive image
- SMILES: ClC1=CC2=C(N=C(NC)C[N+]([O-])=C2C3=CC=CC=C3)C=C1
- InChI: InChI=1S/C16H14ClN3O/c1-18-15-10-20(21)16(11-5-3-2-4-6-11)13-9-12(17)7-8-14(13)19-15/h2-9H,10H2,1H3,(H,18,19); Key:ANTSCNMPPGJYLG-UHFFFAOYSA-N

Chlordiazepoxide sold under the brand name Librium, is a sedative and hypnotic medication of the benzodiazepine class. It is used to treat anxiety, insomnia, and symptoms of withdrawal from alcohol, benzodiazepines, and other drugs. It is also used to discontinue long-term use of other, shorter-acting benzodiazepines due to its long half-life.

Chlordiazepoxide has a medium to long half-life, while its active metabolite has a very long half-life. The drug has amnesic, anticonvulsant, anxiolytic, hypnotic, sedative, and skeletal muscle relaxant properties.

Chlordiazepoxide was patented in 1958 and approved for medical use in 1960. It was the first benzodiazepine to be synthesized, and the discovery of chlordiazepoxide was by pure chance. Chlordiazepoxide and other benzodiazepines were initially accepted with widespread public approval, but were followed with widespread public disapproval and recommendations for more restrictive medical guidelines for its use.

== Medical uses ==
Chlordiazepoxide hydrochloride is indicated for the short-term (2–4 weeks) treatment of anxiety that is severe and disabling or subjects a person to uncomfortable distress. It is also indicated as a treatment for the management of acute alcohol withdrawal syndrome.

Chlordiazepoxide hydrochloride may be used by chronic benzodiazepine users to discontinue benzodiazepine use. The long half-life means that the patient’s final dose will last several days, making the likelihood of withdrawal symptoms lower. Tapering can last months to years.

It is sometimes prescribed to ease symptoms of irritable bowel syndrome (IBS) when combined with clidinium bromide in the fixed dose medication, Librax.

== Contraindications ==
Use of chlordiazepoxide should be avoided in individuals with the following conditions:

- Myasthenia gravis
- Acute intoxication with alcohol, narcotics, or other psychoactive substances
- Ataxia
- Severe hypoventilation
- Acute narrow-angle glaucoma
- Severe liver deficiencies (hepatitis and liver cirrhosis decrease elimination by a factor of 2)
- Severe sleep apnea
- Hypersensitivity or allergy to any drug in the benzodiazepine class

Chlordiazepoxide is generally considered an inappropriate benzodiazepine for the elderly due to its long elimination half-life and the risks of accumulation. Benzodiazepines require special precaution if used in the elderly, pregnancy, children, alcohol- or drug-dependent individuals and individuals with comorbid psychiatric disorders.

=== Pregnancy ===
The research into the safety of benzodiazepines during pregnancy is limited and it is recommended that use of benzodiazepines during pregnancy should be based on whether the benefits outweigh the risks. If chlordiazepoxide is used during pregnancy, the risks can be reduced via using the lowest effective dose and for the shortest time possible. Benzodiazepines should generally be avoided during the first trimester of pregnancy. Chlordiazepoxide and diazepam are considered to be among the safer benzodiazepines to use during pregnancy in comparison to other benzodiazepines. Possible adverse effects from benzodiazepine use during pregnancy include miscarriage, malformation, intrauterine growth retardation, functional deficits, carcinogenesis and mutagenesis. Caution is also advised during breast feeding as chlordiazepoxide passes into breast milk.

== Adverse effects ==
Sedative drugs and sleeping pills, including chlordiazepoxide, have been associated with an increased risk of death. The studies had many limitations, such as possible tendency to overestimate risk, possible confounding by indication with other risk factors and confusing hypnotics with drugs having other indications.

Common side-effects of chlordiazepoxide include:

- Confusion
- Constipation
- Drowsiness
- Fainting
- Altered sex drive
- Liver problems
- Lack of muscle coordination
- Minor menstrual irregularities
- Nausea
- Skin rash or eruptions
- Swelling due to fluid retention
- Yellow eyes and skin

Chlordiazepoxide in laboratory mice studies impairs latent learning. Benzodiazepines impair learning and memory via their action on benzodiazepine receptors, which causes a dysfunction in the cholinergic neuronal system in mice. It was later found that impairment in learning was caused by an increase in benzodiazepine/GABA activity (and that benzodiazepines were not associated with the cholinergic system). In tests of various benzodiazepine compounds, chlordiazepoxide was found to cause the most profound reduction in the turnover of 5HT (serotonin) in rats. Serotonin is closely involved in regulating mood and may be one of the causes of feelings of depression in rats using chlordiazepoxide or other benzodiazepines.

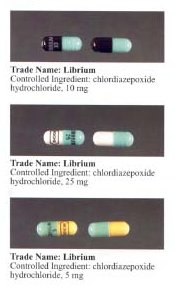

In September 2020, the US Food and Drug Administration (FDA) required the boxed warning for all benzodiazepine medicines to be updated to describe the risks of abuse, misuse, addiction, physical dependence, and withdrawal reactions consistently across all the medicines in the class.

=== Tolerance and dependence ===
==== Tolerance ====
Chronic use of benzodiazepines, such as chlordiazepoxide, leads to the development of tolerance, with a decrease in number of benzodiazepine binding sites in mice forebrains. The Committee of Review of Medicines, who carried out an extensive review of benzodiazepines including chlordiazepoxide, found—and were in agreement with the US Institute of Medicine and the conclusions of a study carried out by the White House Office of Drug Policy and the US National Institute on Drug Abuse—that there was little evidence that long-term use of benzodiazepines was beneficial in the treatment of insomnia due to the development of tolerance. Benzodiazepines tended to lose their sleep-promoting properties within 3 to 14 days of continuous use, and in the treatment of anxiety the committee found that there was little convincing evidence that benzodiazepines retained efficacy in the treatment of anxiety after four months' continuous use due to the development of tolerance.

==== Dependence ====
Chlordiazepoxide can cause physical dependence and what is known as the benzodiazepine withdrawal syndrome. Withdrawal from chlordiazepoxide or other benzodiazepines often leads to withdrawal symptoms that are similar to those seen with alcohol and barbiturates. The higher the dose and the longer the drug is taken, the risk of experiencing unpleasant withdrawal symptoms becomes greater. Withdrawal symptoms can, however, occur at standard dosages and also after short-term use. Benzodiazepine treatment should be discontinued as soon as possible through a slow and gradual dose-reduction regime.

Chlordiazepoxide taken during pregnancy can cause a postnatal benzodiazepine withdrawal syndrome.

=== Overdose ===
An individual who has consumed excess chlordiazepoxide may display some of the following symptoms:

- Somnolence (difficulty staying awake)
- Mental confusion
- Hypotension
- Hypoventilation
- Impaired motor functions
  - Impaired reflexes
  - Impaired coordination
  - Impaired balance
  - Dizziness
  - Muscle weakness
- Coma

Chlordiazepoxide is typically used under controlled conditions for specific syndromes and sees far less frequent usage when compared to newer drugs of the same class and thus is unlikely to be encountered in a clinical emergency setting as a stand-alone drug causing life-threatening concern. Like other drugs in its class, chlordiazepoxide alongside benzodiazepines as a whole have a lowered potential to cause life-threatening injury - though this does not preclude their common co-contaminant discovery with other depressant drugs of abuse, nor their ability to contribute to an already potentially fatal episode of drug-induced respiratory depression. In cases of suspected overdose, supportive care and observation are most often indicated and provided incrementally in relation to severity and duration of symptoms. Flumazenil is uniquely poised as an "antidote" that specifically counteracts damaging central nervous system affect induced via benzodiazepine mechanism of action - though is not generally indicated in relation to the severity of symptoms where other treatment options exist, and often has numerous damaging consequences that must be carefully weighted before any potential administration.

== Pharmacology ==
Chlordiazepoxide acts on benzodiazepine allosteric sites that are part of the GABA_{A} receptor/ion-channel complex and this results in an increased binding of the inhibitory neurotransmitter GABA to the GABA_{A} receptor thereby producing inhibitory effects on the central nervous system and body similar to the effects of other benzodiazepines. Chlordiazepoxide is an anticonvulsant.

Chlordiazepoxide is preferentially stored in some organs including the hearts of neonates. Absorption by any administered route and the risk of accumulation is significantly higher in neonates. The withdrawal of chlordiazepoxide during pregnancy and breast feeding is recommended, as chlordiazepoxide rapidly crosses the placenta and also is excreted in breast milk. Chlordiazepoxide also decreases prolactin release in rats. Benzodiazepines act via micromolar benzodiazepine binding sites as Ca2+ channel blockers and significantly inhibit depolarization-sensitive Calcium uptake in animal nerve terminal preparations. Chlordiazepoxide inhibits acetylcholine release in mouse hippocampal synaptosomes in vivo. This has been found by measuring sodium-dependent high affinity choline uptake in vitro after pretreatment of the mice in vivo with chlordiazepoxide. This may play a role in chlordiazepoxide's anticonvulsant properties.

== Pharmacokinetics ==
Chlordiazepoxide is a long-acting benzodiazepine drug. The half-life of chlordiazepoxide is from 5 to 30 hours but has an active benzodiazepine metabolite, nordiazepam, which has a half-life of 36 to 200 hours. The half-life of chlordiazepoxide increases significantly in the elderly, which may result in prolonged action as well as accumulation of the drug during repeated administration. Delayed body clearance of the long half-life active metabolite also occurs in those over 60 years of age, which further prolongs the effects of the drugs with additional accumulation after repeated dosing.

Despite its name, chlordiazepoxide is not an epoxide.

== History ==
Chlordiazepoxide (initially called methaminodiazepoxide) was the first benzodiazepine to be synthesized in the mid-1950s. The synthesis was derived from work on a class of dyes, quinazoline-3-oxides. It was discovered by accident when in 1957 tests revealed that the compound had hypnotic, anxiolytic, and muscle relaxant effects. "The story of the chemical development of Librium and Valium was told by Sternbach. The serendipity involved in the invention of this class of compounds was matched by the trials and errors of the pharmacologists in the discovery of the tranquilizing activity of the benzodiazepines. The discovery of Librium in 1957 was due largely to the dedicated work and observational ability of a gifted technician, Beryl Kappell. For some seven years she had been screening compounds by simple animal tests for muscle relaxant activity using Myanesin as a standard and then meprobamate and chlorpromazine when they became available. All compounds submitted by the chemical staff for central nervous activity were screened. It was this battery of tests that picked out RO 5-0690 (Librium, chlordiazepoxide) as being similar but more potent than meprobamate." Three years later chlordiazepoxide was marketed as a therapeutic benzodiazepine medication under the brand name Librium. Following chlordiazepoxide, in 1963 diazepam hit the market under the brand name Valium—and was followed by many further benzodiazepine compounds over the subsequent years and decades.

In 1959 it was used by over 2,000 physicians and more than 20,000 patients. It was described as "chemically and clinically different from any of the tranquilizers, psychic energizers or other psychotherapeutic drugs now available." During studies, chlordiazepoxide induced muscle relaxation and a quieting effect on laboratory animals like mice, rats, cats, and dogs. Fear and aggression were eliminated in much smaller doses than those necessary to produce hypnosis. Chlordiazepoxide is similar to phenobarbital in its anticonvulsant properties. However, it lacks the hypnotic effects of barbiturates. Animal tests were conducted in the Boston Zoo and the San Diego Zoo. Forty-two hospital patients admitted for acute and chronic alcoholism, and various psychoses and neuroses were treated with chlordiazepoxide. In a majority of the patients, anxiety, tension, and motor excitement were "effectively reduced." The most positive results were observed among alcoholic patients. It was reported that ulcers and dermatologic problems, both of which involved emotional factors, were reduced by chlordiazepoxide.

In 1963, approval for use was given to diazepam (Valium), a "simplified" version of chlordiazepoxide, primarily to counteract anxiety symptoms. Sleep-related problems were treated with nitrazepam (Mogadon), which was introduced in 1972, temazepam (Restoril), which was introduced in 1979, and flurazepam (Dalmane), which was introduced in 1975.

== Recreational use ==
In 1963, Carl F. Essig of the Addiction Research Center of the National Institute of Mental Health stated that meprobamate, glutethimide, ethinamate, ethchlorvynol, methyprylon and chlordiazepoxide were drugs whose usefulness “can hardly be questioned.” However, Essig labeled these “newer products” as “drugs of addiction,” like barbiturates, whose habit-forming qualities were more widely known. He mentioned a 90-day study of chlordiazepoxide, which concluded that the automobile accident rate among 68 users was 10 times higher than normal. Participants' daily dosage ranged from 5 to 100 milligrams.

Chlordiazepoxide is a drug of potential misuse and is frequently detected in urine samples of drug users who have not been prescribed the drug.

=== Legal status ===
Internationally, chlordiazepoxide is a Schedule IV controlled drug under the Convention on Psychotropic Substances.

== Toxicity ==
=== Animal ===
Laboratory tests assessing the toxicity of chlordiazepoxide, nitrazepam and diazepam on mice spermatozoa found that chlordiazepoxide produced toxicities in sperm including abnormalities involving both the shape and size of the sperm head. Nitrazepam, however, caused more profound abnormalities than chlordiazepoxide.

== Society and culture ==
Chlordiazepoxide is the drug referenced in the Netflix series "The Queen's Gambit," under the commercial name Librium. It also appears prominently in the HBO series "The Pitt." In “Infinite Jest”, by David Foster Wallace, a nurse “negotiated a trade of shoes for Librium” with the character Tiny Ewell. In the first episode of Yes, Minister, Jim Hacker tells his wife Annie to take a Librium when she couldn't find a cigarette.

== Availability ==
Chlordiazepoxide is available in various dosage forms, alone or in combination with other drugs, worldwide. In combination with clidinium as NORMAXIN-CC and in combination with dicycloverine as NORMAXIN for IBS, and with the tricyclic antidepressant amitriptyline as Limbitrol.

== See also ==
- Alcohol withdrawal syndrome
- Benzodiazepine
- Benzodiazepine dependence
- Benzodiazepine withdrawal syndrome
- Effects of long-term benzodiazepine use
