= Pyrithyldione =

Chemical compound

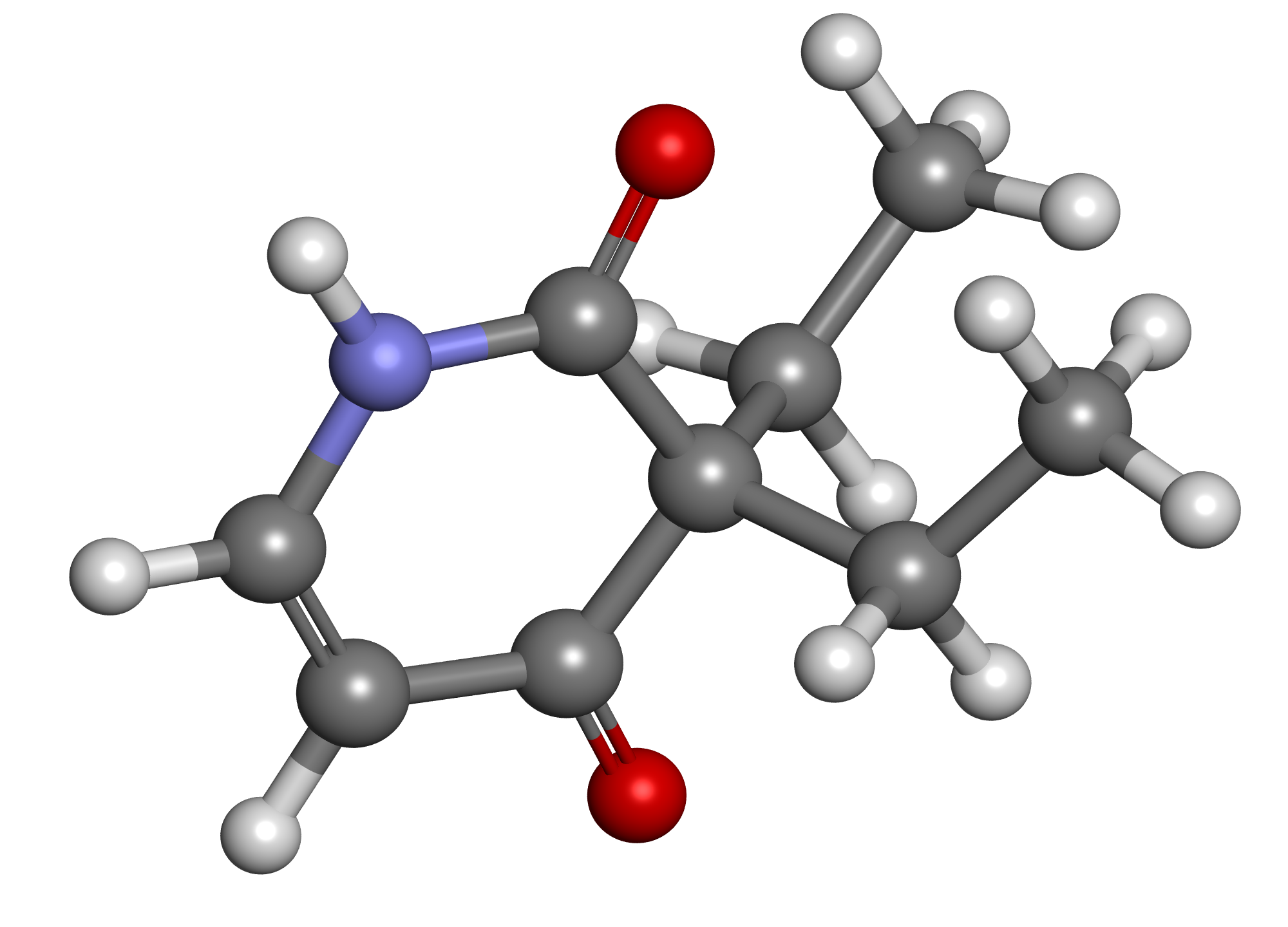

Clinical data
- Trade names: Benedorm, Didropyridine, Dihydroprylone, Persedon, Presidon, Pyridion, Pyridione, Pyrithyldion, Pyrithyldione, Tetridin, Tetridine
- ATC code: N05CE03 (WHO)

Identifiers
- IUPAC name: 3,3-diethylpyridine-2,4(1H,3H)-dione
- CAS Number: 77-04-3
- PubChem CID: 4994
- ChemSpider: 4820
- UNII: 8AB20823CK
- KEGG: D07329
- ChEMBL: ChEMBL1722501
- CompTox Dashboard (EPA): DTXSID4045262
- ECHA InfoCard: 100.000.910

Chemical and physical data
- Formula: C_{9}H_{13}NO_{2}
- Molar mass: 167.208 g·mol^{−1}
- 3D model (JSmol): Interactive image
- SMILES: O=C1N/C=C\C(=O)C1(CC)CC
- InChI: InChI=1S/C9H13NO2/c1-3-9(4-2)7(11)5-6-10-8(9)12/h5-6H,3-4H2,1-2H3,(H,10,12); Key:NZASCBIBXNPDMH-UHFFFAOYSA-N

Pyrithyldione (traded as Presidon, Persedon, and Benedorm among others) is a central nervous system depressant developed in 1949 as a non-barbiturate sedative-hypnotic drug. An improved method of manufacture was patented by Hoffmann-La Roche in 1959.

== Pharmacology ==
=== Chemical class and analogues ===
Chemically classified among lactams and ketones, specifically a 2,4-dioxotetrahydropyridine derivative, pyrithyldione shares structural and pharmacological similarities with glutethimide (another CYP2D6 inducer, albeit more potent) and methyprylon, both indicated as sedative-hypnotics. All of these compounds, including pyrithyldione, were developed as alternatives to barbiturates, aiming for reduced toxicity and dependence liability.

=== Mechanism of action and metabolism ===
Acting as a GABAA receptor positive allosteric modulator, pyrithyldione was indicated as a hypnotic and sedative in the 1950s. A CYP2D6 inducer, albeit weaker than its analogue glutethimide, in studies it increased the O-demethylation of codeine by ~20%.

=== Adverse effects ===
Agranulocytosis was reported in some patients.

== History ==
Pyrithyldione was first described in medical literature in April 1949. Roche patented an improved synthesis method in 1959.

The Martindale USP Drug Reference list it as having been marketed under various trade names, including Presidon, Persedon, Benedorm, Didropyridine, Dihydroprylone, Tetridin, and Tetridine. Spelling variants result from INN and USAN, thus resulting in the same molecule being spelt Pyridion, Pyridione, and Pyrithyldion depnending upon the source. These are transliterations, but not distinct brand names.

The drug was voluntarily discontinued by its manufacturers and subsequently recognized as a withdrawn drug in compendia. Similar to other nonbarbiturate CNS depressants such as chlorphenesin carbamate and ethchlorvynol, Its withdrawal was attributed to safety concerns, particularly reports of agranulocytosis.

== See also ==
- Piperidione – chemically related, used briefly as a hypnotic before being withdrawn.
- Glutethimide
- Chlorphenesin carbamate
- Apronal
