= Clocental =

Chemical compound

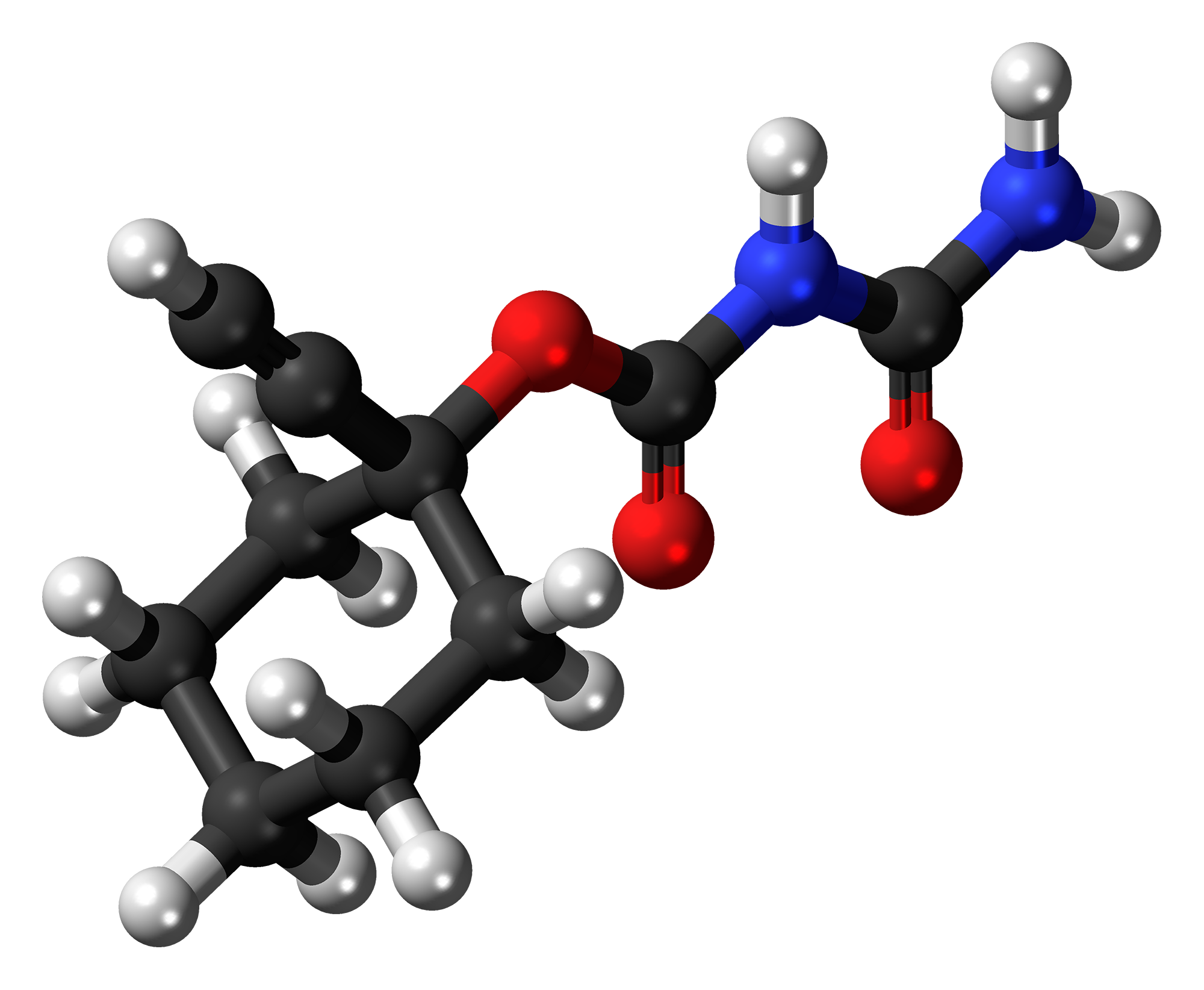

Clinical data
- Other names: Dolcental

Identifiers
- IUPAC name: (1-Ethynylcyclohexyl) N-carbamoylcarbamate
- CAS Number: 562-94-7
- PubChem CID: 11231
- ChemSpider: 10757
- UNII: UX2C2JZD57
- CompTox Dashboard (EPA): DTXSID80204741

Chemical and physical data
- Formula: C_{10}H_{14}N_{2}O_{3}
- Molar mass: 210.233 g·mol^{−1}
- 3D model (JSmol): Interactive image
- SMILES: C#CC1(CCCCC1)OC(=O)NC(=O)N
- InChI: InChI=1S/C10H14N2O3/c1-2-10(6-4-3-5-7-10)15-9(14)12-8(11)13/h1H,3-7H2,(H3,11,12,13,14); Key:CQVLNDZXTPGTFD-UHFFFAOYSA-N

Clocental, or dolcental, is a carbamate derivative with sedative hypnotic properties.

== Synthesis ==

Clocental was first prepared by the acylation of 1-ethynylcyclohexanol with allophanyl chloride.

== See also ==
- Methylpentynol
- Meprobamate
- Chlorphenesin carbamate
- Ethinamate
- Phenprobamate
- Carbromal
