= 1-Ethynylcyclohexanol =

Chemical compound

Identifiers
- IUPAC name: 1-ethynylcyclohexan-1-ol
- CAS Number: 78-27-3
- PubChem CID: 6525
- ChemSpider: 6277
- UNII: 6RV04025EH
- ChEMBL: ChEMBL394631
- CompTox Dashboard (EPA): DTXSID0021757
- ECHA InfoCard: 100.001.001

Chemical and physical data
- Formula: C_{8}H_{12}O
- Molar mass: 124.183 g·mol^{−1}
- 3D model (JSmol): Interactive image
- Melting point: 30–33 °C (86–91 °F)
- SMILES: C#CC1(CCCCC1)O
- InChI: InChI=1S/C8H12O/c1-2-8(9)6-4-3-5-7-8/h1,9H,3-7H2; Key:QYLFHLNFIHBCPR-UHFFFAOYSA-N

1-Ethynylcyclohexanol (ECX) is an alkynyl alcohol derivative which is both a synthetic precursor to, and active metabolite of, the hypnotic/soporific drug, ethinamate, and has similar sedative, anticonvulsant and muscle relaxant effects. It has been sold as a designer drug, first being identified in the UK in March 2012.

== Preparation ==
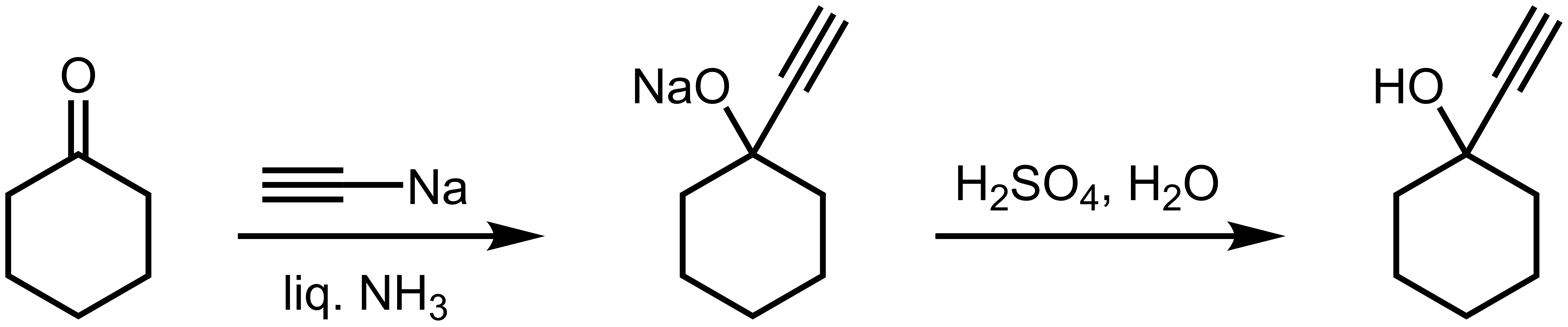
Synthesis of 1-ethynylcyclohexanol from cyclohexanone.

1-Ethynylcyclohexanol can be prepared from cyclohexanone by reacting it with sodium acetylide in liquid ammonia, followed by an acidic work-up.

Acetylene also directly reacts with cyclohexanone under basic conditions in liquid ammonia. The base, which is usually sodium hydroxide or potassium hydroxide, deprotonates the acetylene, which then attacks the carbonyl group. The resulting alkoxide is then converted to the alcohol by the proton that was removed from the acetylene.

Industrial synthesis of 1-ethynylcyclohexanol

== See also ==
- 1,6-Dioxecane-2,7-dione
- 2-Methyl-2-butanol
- 2-Methyl-2-pentanol
- 3-Methyl-3-pentanol
- Clocental
- Ethchlorvynol
- Methylpentynol
- Prenderol
