= Ethinamate =

Pharmaceutical drug

Clinical data
- Trade names: Valmid, Valamin
- AHFS/Drugs.com: Micromedex Detailed Consumer Information
- Pregnancy category: C
- Routes of administration: Oral
- ATC code: none

Legal status
- Legal status: BR: Class B1 (Psychoactive drugs); CA: Schedule IV; DE: Anlage II (Authorized trade only, not prescriptible); UK: Class C; US: Schedule IV; In general: ℞ (Prescription only)

Pharmacokinetic data
- Elimination half-life: 2.5 hours

Identifiers
- IUPAC name: (1-ethynylcyclohexyl)carbamate
- CAS Number: 126-52-3
- PubChem CID: 3284
- IUPHAR/BPS: 7325
- DrugBank: DB01031
- ChemSpider: 3169
- UNII: IAN371PP48
- KEGG: D00703
- ChEBI: CHEBI:4884
- ChEMBL: ChEMBL1576
- CompTox Dashboard (EPA): DTXSID7023013
- ECHA InfoCard: 100.004.355

Chemical and physical data
- Formula: C_{9}H_{13}NO_{2}
- Molar mass: 167.208 g·mol^{−1}
- 3D model (JSmol): Interactive image
- SMILES: O=C(OC1(C#C)CCCCC1)N
- InChI: InChI=1S/C9H13NO2/c1-2-9(12-8(10)11)6-4-3-5-7-9/h1H,3-7H2,(H2,10,11); Key:GXRZIMHKGDIBEW-UHFFFAOYSA-N

Ethinamate, marketed as Valmid in the United States and Valamin in Australia, is a central nervous system depressant of the carbamate drug class. It was formerly prescribed as a hypnotic for the short-term treatment of insomnia. The drug has a rapid onset of action, a short elimination half-life of around 2.5 hours, and a correspondingly brief duration of effect. Prolonged use leads to drug tolerance, drug dependence, and diminished efficacy after seven days of continuous use.

== Availability ==
Ethinamate was introduced by German drug company Schering AG in 1957, marketed as a sleeping pill with a reduced risk of fatality in drug overdose compared to barbiturate overdose. Ethinamate was commonly prescribed in Germany, the United States, Australia, Canada, the Netherlands, and much of Europe. Ethinamate is not known to be available in any country. Despite being available in the U.S. until 1982, ethinamate largely fell out of favor by the 1960s, as contemporary novel sedatives were viewed as safer alternatives, including methaqualone, ethchlorvynol, glutethimide, methyprylon, meprobamate, and by the 1960s, chlordiazepoxide and diazepam.

=== Recognition ===
In the United States, ethinamate is now primarily associated with the death of Elvis Presley, as it was listed among multiple sedatives detected in toxicology reports, leading forensic expert Cyril Wecht to emphasized the important role of polypharmacy in the case.

== Toxicity and overdose ==
Ethinamate debuted nearly at the same time as methyprylon and other "nonbarbiturate soporifics," including ethchlorvynol and glutethimide, were being developed and released continuously. Supratherapeutic dosing of 3,000 mg (nearly seven-fold a therapeutic dose) induced a temporary loss of consciousness or comatose state, but resulted in full recovery.

Activated charcoal may reduce absorption if administered early, and hemodialysis can be considered in severe cases.

== Adverse effects and safety in pregnancy ==
Common side effects at therapeutic doses are gastrointestinal upset (nausea, vomiting, gastrointestinal upset, rare reactions indicative of hypersensitivity involve thrombocytopenia purpura, fever and various skin rashes. The drug is classified as pregnancy Category C, and is not recommended during pregnancy or breastfeeding due to insufficient evidence regarding potential teratogenic effects. Animal studies suggest porphyrinogenic potential in vivo.

== Chemistry and synthesis ==
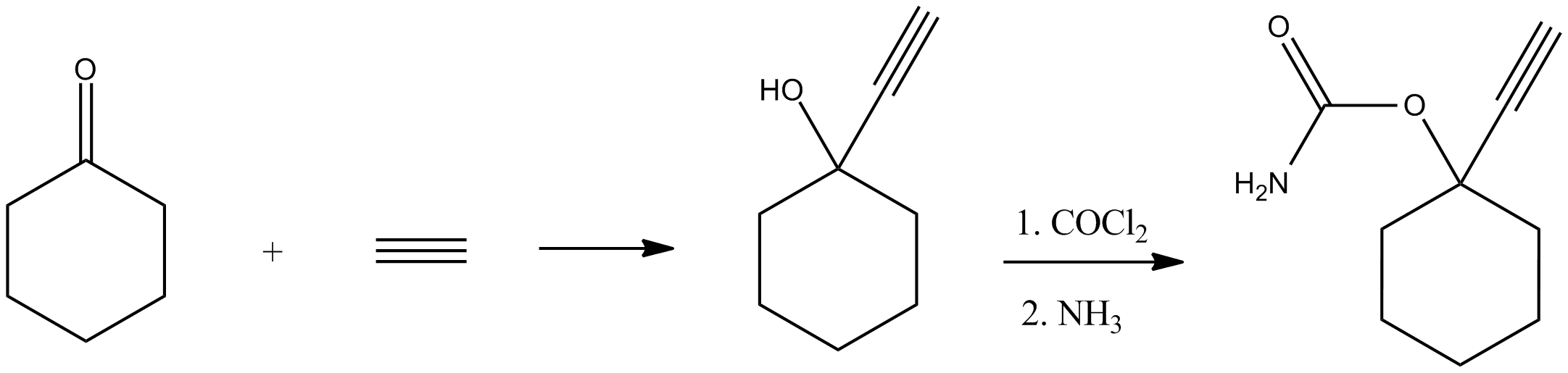
The compound is synthesized by reacting acetylene with cyclohexanone to form 1-ethynylcyclohexanol. This intermediate is then converted into a carbamate through reaction with phosgene and ammonia. Small amounts of lithium or similar reagents may be used to facilitate the initial acetylene reaction.

Ethinamate, whose molecular structure is known as 1-ethynylcyclohexane carbamate is an odorless, white crystalline powder. It is typically formulated as 500 mg tablets for oral administration, with an adult dose of one tablet at bedtime; two tablets may be taken if necessary. Children are more prone to paradoxical effects and the drug is not indicated for individuals under 18.The compound is synthesized by reacting acetylene with cyclohexanone to form 1-ethynylcyclohexanol. This intermediate is then converted into a carbamate through reaction with phosgene and ammonia. Small amounts of lithium or similar reagents may be used to facilitate the initial acetylene reaction. After ingestion, ethinamate is metabolized to the active compound 4-hydroxyethinamate, which is eliminated in urine with a half-life of approximately 2.5 hours.
