= Ketazolam =

Benzodiazepine drug

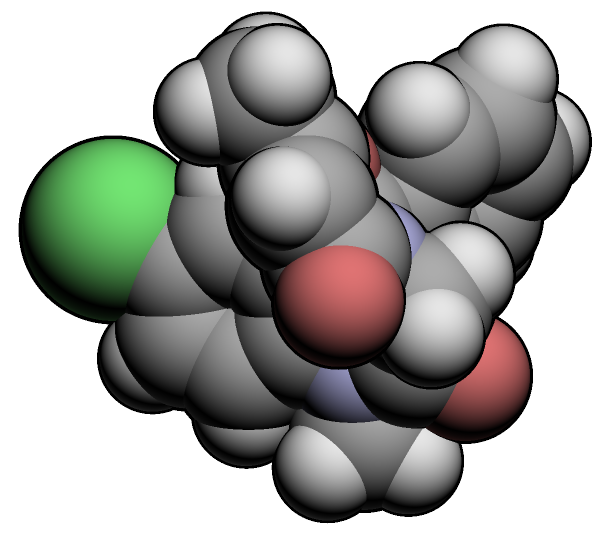

Clinical data
- AHFS/Drugs.com: Micromedex Detailed Consumer Information
- Routes of administration: Oral
- ATC code: N05BA10 (WHO)

Legal status
- Legal status: BR: Class B1 (Psychoactive drugs); CA: Schedule IV; DE: Prescription only (Anlage III for higher doses); US: Schedule IV

Pharmacokinetic data
- Metabolism: Hepatic
- Elimination half-life: 26–200 hours
- Excretion: Renal

Identifiers
- IUPAC name: 11-chloro-2,8-dimethyl-12b-phenyl-6H-[1,3]oxazino[3,2-d][1,4]benzodiazepine-4,7-dione
- CAS Number: 27223-35-4
- PubChem CID: 33746
- DrugBank: DB01587
- ChemSpider: 31110
- UNII: 92A214MD7Y
- KEGG: D04650
- CompTox Dashboard (EPA): DTXSID20865350
- ECHA InfoCard: 100.043.937

Chemical and physical data
- Formula: C_{20}H_{17}ClN_{2}O_{3}
- Molar mass: 368.82 g·mol^{−1}
- 3D model (JSmol): Interactive image
- SMILES: ClC1=CC2=C(N(C)C(CN3C(C=C(C)OC32C4=CC=CC=C4)=O)=O)C=C1
- InChI: InChI=1S/C20H17ClN2O3/c1-13-10-18(24)23-12-19(25)22(2)17-9-8-15(21)11-16(17)20(23,26-13)14-6-4-3-5-7-14/h3-11H,12H2,1-2H3; Key:PWAJCNITSBZRBL-UHFFFAOYSA-N

Ketazolam (marketed under the brand names Anseren, Ansieten, Ansietil, Marcen, Sedatival, Sedotime, Solatran and Unakalm) is a drug which is a benzodiazepine derivative. It possesses anxiolytic, anticonvulsant, sedative and skeletal muscle relaxant properties.

== Therapeutic uses ==
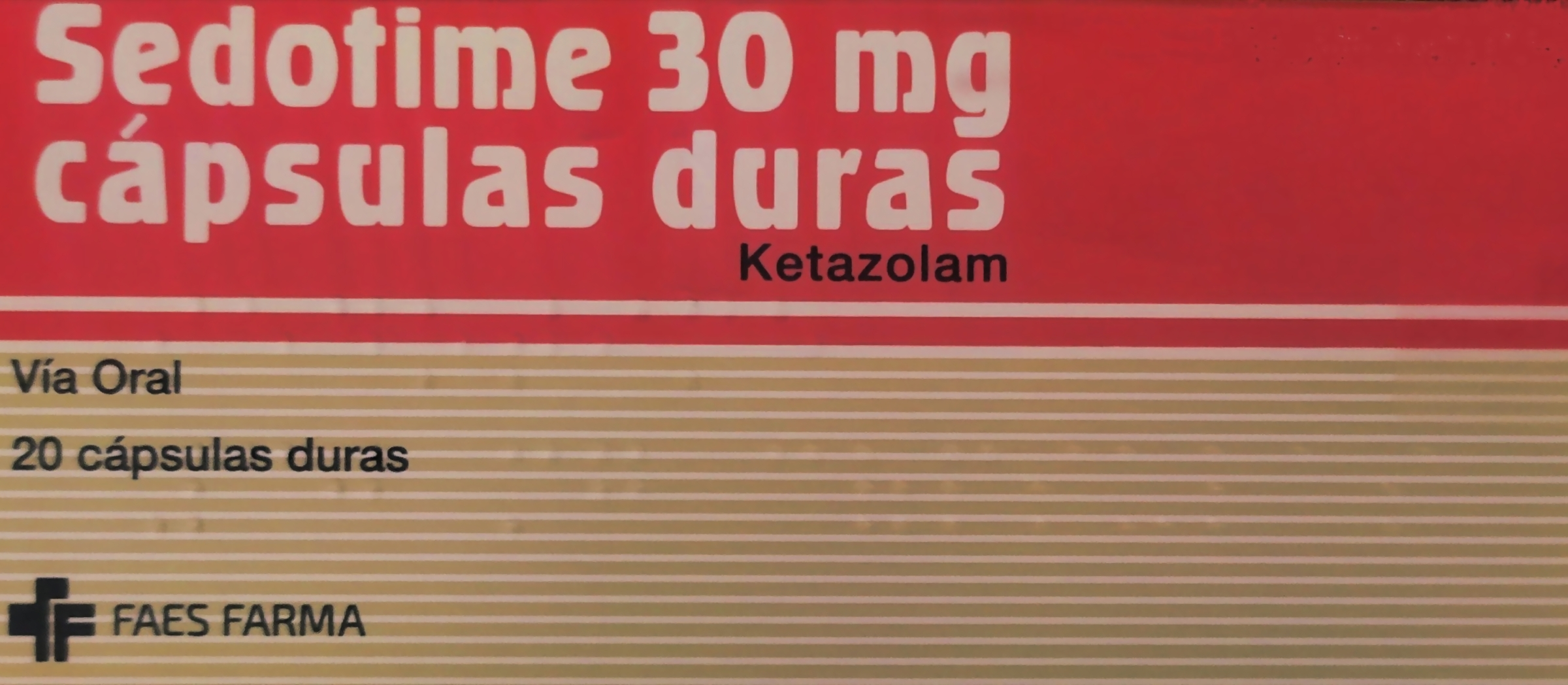
Ketazolam sold under the name Sedotime in Spain

It is used for the treatment of anxiety and has similar effectiveness compared to diazepam. Ketazolam also appears to produce reduced levels of side effects such as sedation compared with diazepam and the side effects when they occur tend to be milder. Ketazolam is also an effective antispasmodic drug and is used for the treatment of spasticity.

== Availability ==
Ketazolam is not approved for sale in Norway, Australia, United Kingdom or the United States. In South Africa, GlaxoSmithKline markets ketazolam under its Solatran brand name. In Canada, ketazolam is listed in schedule IV of the Controlled Drugs and Substances Act, along with other benzodiazepines.

== Tolerance and physical dependence ==
Chronic use of ketazolam as with other benzodiazepines can lead to physical dependence and the appearance of the benzodiazepine withdrawal syndrome upon cessation of use or decrease in dose. Tolerance to ketazolam's therapeutic effects occurs over a period of 15 days.

== Contraindications and special caution ==
Benzodiazepines require special precaution if used in the elderly, during pregnancy, in children, alcohol or drug-dependent individuals and individuals with comorbid psychiatric disorders.

== Pharmacokinetics ==
Ketazolam breaks down in the blood to diazepam which breaks down to demoxepam which breaks down to desmethyldiazepam.

== Warnings ==
The U.S. Food and Drug Administration warns that in Spain, ketazolam marketed as Marcen may sometimes be mistakenly confused with Narcan.

== Legal status ==
Ketazolam is a List 3 drug under the Betäubungsmittelgesetz, like almost all benzodiazepines in Germany. Ketazolam is a List II drugs of the Opium Law in the Netherlands. Ketazolam is a Schedule IV drug under the Controlled Substances Act in the US.
