= C19H18ClN3O =

The molecular formula C_{19}H_{18}ClN_{3}O (molar mass: 339.82 g/mol, exact mass: 339.1138 u) may refer to:

- Cresyl violet
- Cyprazepam
