= C9H15NO2 =

The molecular formula C_{9}H_{15}NO_{2} (molar mass: 169.22 g/mol) may refer to:

- Aceclidine, a parasympathomimetic miotic agent used in the treatment of narrow angle glaucoma
- Piperidione, a sedative drug
