= C15H11ClN2O2 =

Molecular formula

The molecular formula C_{15}H_{11}ClN_{2}O_{2} (molar mass: 286.71 g/mol) may refer to:

- Demoxepam
- Oxazepam
