= Chlordiazepoxide/clidinium bromide =

Fixed-dose combination of an anxiety medication and a anticholinergic drug

Combination of
- Chlordiazepoxide: Anxiolytic
- Clidinium bromide: Antimuscarinic

Clinical data
- Trade names: Librax, others
- AHFS/Drugs.com: Micromedex Detailed Consumer Information
- MedlinePlus: a601036
- Routes of administration: By mouth
- ATC code: A03CA02 (WHO)

Legal status
- Legal status: US: Schedule IV

Identifiers
- CAS Number: 8015-20-1
- PubChem CID: 3080646
- ChemSpider: 2338393
- KEGG: D10247
- CompTox Dashboard (EPA): DTXSID501000995

Chlordiazepoxide/clidinium bromide (marketed as Librax among others) is a fixed-dose combination medication used to treat peptic ulcers, irritable bowel syndrome (IBS), and gastritis. It contains chlordiazepoxide and clidinium bromide. It helps relieve stomach spasms, abdominal cramps, and anxiety. Librax is a fixed ratio of these two medications and, as such, is not typically prescribed with an accompanying dosage, but rather directions on how many capsules to take per day. It comes in a capsule taken by mouth, usually three or four times daily, before meals and at bedtime. Chlordiazepoxide is an anti-anxiety medication belonging to the benzodiazepine class. Its use in IBS is thought to be due to its calming ability for patients that have IBS symptoms that are worsened by anxiety. Clidinium bromide is a synthetic quaternary ammonium antimuscarinic, a sub-class of a family of drugs known as anticholinergics. It treats IBS by decreasing gastrointestinal motility.

Chlordiazepoxide can be habit-forming. Tolerance may develop with long-term or excessive use, making this medication less effective. This medication must be taken regularly to be effective. Stopping the drug suddenly can worsen the condition and cause withdrawal symptoms (anxiousness, sleeplessness, and irritability).

It was approved for medical use in the United States in 1966. It is available as a generic medication.

== Medical uses ==
Chlordiazepoxide/clidinium bromide is indicated to control emotional and somatic factors in gastrointestinal disorders. It may also be used as adjunctive therapy in the treatment of peptic ulcer and in the treatment of the irritable bowel syndrome (irritable colon, spastic colon, mucous colitis) and acute enterocolitis.
