= Amitriptyline/chlordiazepoxide =

Combination drug

- Amitriptyline (top) and chlordiazepoxide (bottom)

Combination of
- Amitriptyline: Tricyclic antidepressant
- Chlordiazepoxide: Benzodiazepine

Clinical data
- Pronunciation: /ˌklɔːr.daɪəz.ɪˈpɒksaɪd/ /ˌæmɪˈtrɪptɪliːn/
- Trade names: Limbitrol, Limbitrol DS
- Routes of administration: Oral

Legal status
- Legal status: In general: ℞ (Prescription only)

Amitriptyline/chlordiazepoxide, sold under the brand names Limbitrol and Limbitrol DS, is a combination of amitriptyline (Elavil), a tricyclic antidepressant, and chlordiazepoxide (Librium), a benzodiazepine, which is approved for the treatment of depression associated with anxiety in the United States. It is taken orally and contains 12.5 to 25 mg amitriptyline and 5 to 10 mg chlordiazepoxide per tablet.

== Medical uses ==
Amitriptyline/chlordiazepoxide is used for the treatment of moderate to severe depression associated with moderate to severe anxiety. It has shown to be more effective in treating symptoms of anxiety, irritability, and hostility in patients with comorbid depression and anxiety than amitriptyline alone. It also has a quicker onset time than either amitriptyline or chlordiazepoxide on their own.

== Contraindications and precautions ==
Amitriptyline/chlordiazepoxide should not be taken if the patient has recently had a heart attack. It may induce a mixed-manic episode in patients with a history of bipolar disorder or who have had manic or hypomanic episodes in the past. Amitriptyline/chlordiazepoxide may worsen seizures in patients with a previous history of them. Patients older than 65 years of age may be more sensitive to amitriptyline/chlordiazepoxide. It may also have stronger effects on patients with kidney or liver disease due to slowed filtering from the bloodstream. It may also cause adverse effects in patients with a thyroid condition such as hyperthyroidism. Use of amitriptyline/chlordiazepoxide later in pregnancy can cause sedation or symptoms of withdrawal in the infant after delivery. The safety of amitriptyline/chlordiazepoxide for breastfeeding or pediatric patients is unknown.

=== Drug interactions ===
Amitriptyline/chlordiazepoxide should not be taken concomitantly with MAOIs, as doing so may cause high blood pressure and seizures . Like other benzodiazepines, concomitant use of amitriptyline/chlordiazepoxide with opioids increases the risk of drug-related mortality by way of profound sedation and respiratory depression.

== Side effects ==
The most common side effects of amitriptyline/chlordiazepoxide are dry mouth, bloating, dizziness, and constipation. It may also cause blurred vision or increased depression. Amitriptyline/chlordiazepoxide can also cause serotonin syndrome.
