= Piperidione =

Chemical compound

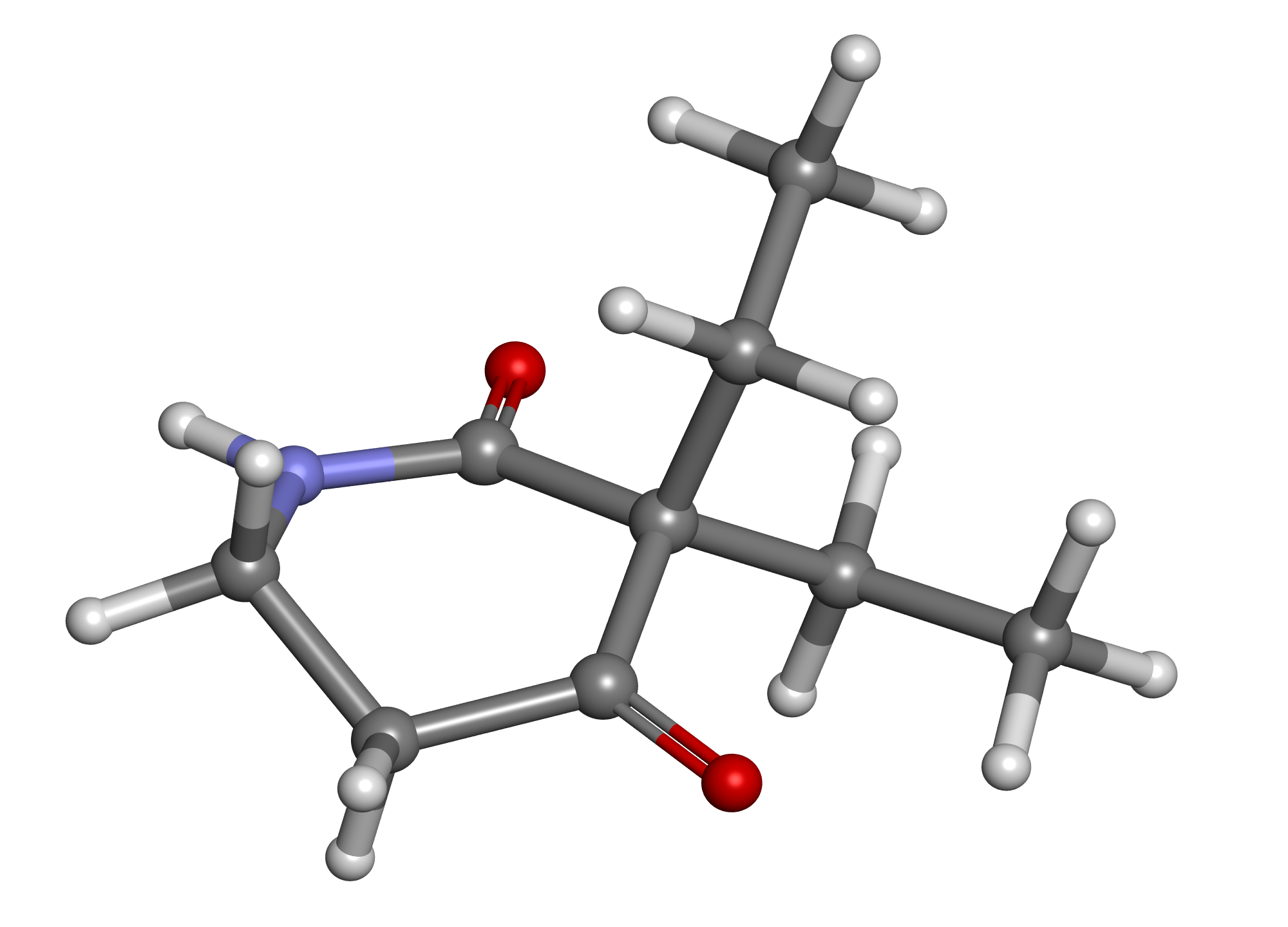

Clinical data
- Trade names: Ascron, Dihyprylon, Dihyprylone, Sedulon, Tusseval
- ATC code: R05DB23 (WHO)

Identifiers
- IUPAC name: 3,3-diethylpiperidine-2,4-dione
- CAS Number: 77-03-2
- PubChem CID: 6465
- ChemSpider: 6222
- UNII: BZ6KL0Q8UD
- CompTox Dashboard (EPA): DTXSID30227804
- ECHA InfoCard: 100.000.909

Chemical and physical data
- Formula: C_{9}H_{15}NO_{2}
- Molar mass: 169.224 g·mol^{−1}
- 3D model (JSmol): Interactive image
- SMILES: O=C1C(C(=O)NCC1)(CC)CC
- InChI: InChI=1S/C9H15NO2/c1-3-9(4-2)7(11)5-6-10-8(9)12/h3-6H2,1-2H3,(H,10,12); Key:RGEVWUKXWFOAID-UHFFFAOYSA-N

Piperidione (trade name Sedulon) is a sedative drug, structurally related to methyprylon and pyrithyldione. It used to be marketed by Roche as a cough medicine available in liquid form. In the US, it was approved by the FDA on grounds of safety alone in 1947. After Roche failed to submit evidence of efficacy to the Drug Efficacy Study Implementation program in 1972, it was withdrawn from the US market.

== See also ==
- Glutethimide
