= Cyprazepam =

Chemical compound

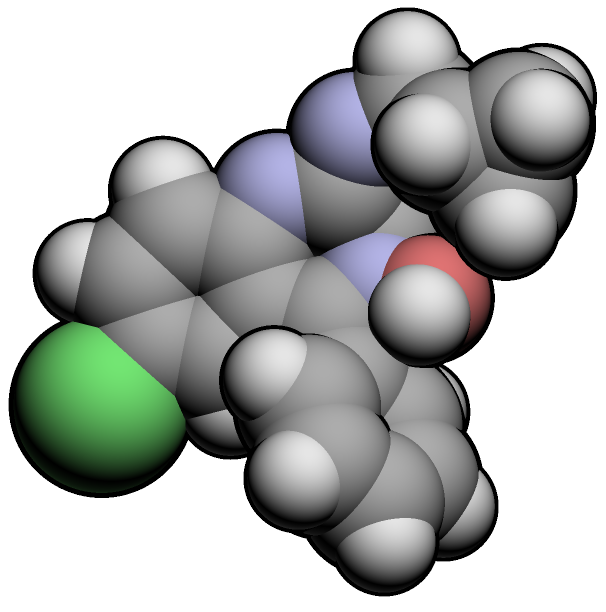

Clinical data
- Routes of administration: Oral
- ATC code: none

Legal status
- Legal status: US: Unscheduled

Pharmacokinetic data
- Metabolism: Hepatic
- Excretion: Renal

Identifiers
- IUPAC name: 10-chloro-N-(cyclopropylmethyl)-3-hydroxy-2-phenyl-3,6-diazabicyclo[5.4.0]undeca-1,6,8,10-tetraen-5-imine
- CAS Number: 15687-07-7
- PubChem CID: 27452
- ChemSpider: 16736916
- UNII: 933N61G4SL
- KEGG: D03631
- ChEMBL: ChEMBL2104165
- CompTox Dashboard (EPA): DTXSID70897505

Chemical and physical data
- Formula: C_{19}H_{18}ClN_{3}O
- Molar mass: 339.82 g·mol^{−1}
- 3D model (JSmol): Interactive image
- SMILES: ClC1=CC2=C(N/C(C[N+]([O-])=C2C3=CC=CC=C3)=N/CC4CC4)C=C1
- InChI: InChI=1S/C19H18ClN3O/c20-15-8-9-17-16(10-15)19(14-4-2-1-3-5-14)23(24)12-18(22-17)21-11-13-6-7-13/h1-5,8-10,13H,6-7,11-12H2,(H,21,22); Key:UKFDTMNJMKWWNK-UHFFFAOYSA-N

Cyprazepam is a drug which is a sedative-hypnotic benzodiazepine derivative. It has anxiolytic properties, and presumably also has hypnotic, skeletal muscle relaxant, anticonvulsant and amnestic properties.

== Synthesis ==
The lactam moiety in benzodiazepams is active towards nucleophiles and numerous analogues have been made by exploiting this fact.

Cyprazepam synthesis:

For example, heating demoxepam with N-cyclopropylmethylamine leads to amidine formation, the minor tranquilizer cyprazepam.

== See also ==
- Benzodiazepine
