= Clidinium bromide =

Anticholinergic, muscarinic antagonist drug

Clinical data
- AHFS/Drugs.com: Monograph
- MedlinePlus: a601036
- Routes of administration: Oral
- ATC code: A03CA02 (WHO) (combination with psycholeptics)

Legal status
- Legal status: US: ℞-only

Pharmacokinetic data
- Bioavailability: Low
- Excretion: Renal and biliary

Identifiers
- IUPAC name: 3-[(2-hydroxy-2,2-diphenylacetyl)oxy]-1-methyl-1-azabicyclo[2.2.2]octan-1-ium bromide
- CAS Number: 7020-55-5 3485-62-9
- PubChem CID: 2784
- IUPHAR/BPS: 366
- DrugBank: DB00771
- ChemSpider: 2682
- UNII: BO76JF850N
- KEGG: D00716
- ChEMBL: ChEMBL1200950
- CompTox Dashboard (EPA): DTXSID6045379

Chemical and physical data
- Formula: C_{22}H_{26}NO_{3}^{+}
- Molar mass: 352.454 g·mol^{−1}
- 3D model (JSmol): Interactive image
- SMILES: O=C(OC2C1CC[N+](CC1)(C)C2)C(O)(c3ccccc3)c4ccccc4
- InChI: InChI=1S/C22H26NO3/c1-23-14-12-17(13-15-23)20(16-23)26-21(24)22(25,18-8-4-2-5-9-18)19-10-6-3-7-11-19/h2-11,17,20,25H,12-16H2,1H3/q+1; Key:HOOSGZJRQIVJSZ-UHFFFAOYSA-N

Clidinium bromide (INN) is an anticholinergic (specifically a muscarinic antagonist) drug. It may help symptoms of cramping and abdominal/stomach pain by decreasing stomach acid, and slowing the intestines. It is commonly prescribed in combination with chlordiazepoxide (a benzodiazepine derivative) using the brand name Librax, Normaxin CC.

== Uses ==
=== Peptic ulcer disease ===
Used in fixed combination with chlordiazepoxide as adjunctive therapy in the treatment of peptic ulcer disease; however, no conclusive data that antimuscarinics aid in the healing, decrease the rate of recurrence, or prevent complications of peptic ulcers.

With the advent of more effective therapies for the treatment of peptic ulcer disease, antimuscarinics have only limited usefulness in this condition.

=== GI motility disturbances ===
Used in fixed combination with chlordiazepoxide in the treatment of functional GI motility disturbances (e.g., irritable bowel syndrome).

Has limited efficacy in treatment of GI motility disturbance and should only be used if other measures (e.g., diet, sedation, counseling, amelioration of environmental factors) have been of little or no benefit.

=== Acute enterocolitis ===
Used in fixed combination with chlordiazepoxide in the treatment of acute enterocolitis. However, antimuscarinics should be used with extreme caution in patients with diarrhea or ulcerative colitis.

== Mechanism of action ==
Clidinium inhibits muscarinic acetylcholine receptors on smooth muscles, secretory glands, and in the central nervous system to relax smooth muscle and decrease biliary tract secretions. It is said to be a selective muscarinic acetylcholine M_{3} receptor antagonist.
