= Glutethimide =

Medication

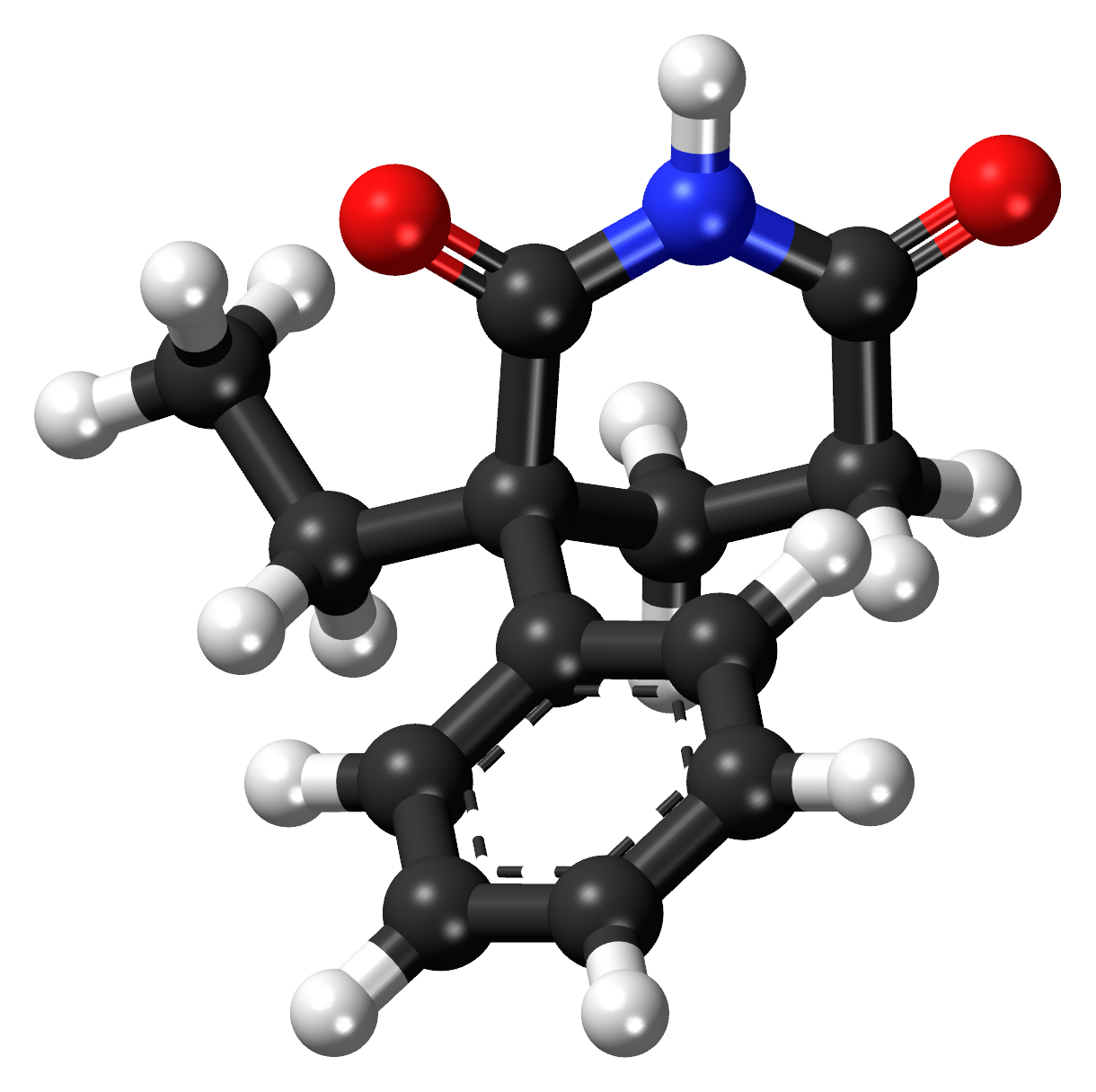

Clinical data
- Pronunciation: /ɡluːˈtɛθɪˌmaɪd/ gloo-TE-thi-MYDE
- Trade names: Doriden, Elrodorm, Noxyron, others
- Pregnancy category: C: (United States)
- Dependence liability: Moderate - high
- Routes of administration: By mouth
- Drug class: Depressant, sedative-hypnotic
- ATC code: N05CE01 (WHO)

Legal status
- Legal status: AU: S8 (Controlled drug); BR: Class B1 (Psychoactive drugs); CA: Schedule IV; DE: Anlage II (Authorized trade only, not prescriptible); UK: Class B; US: Schedule II; UN: Psychotropic Schedule III

Pharmacokinetic data
- Bioavailability: Variable (T_{max} = 1–6 hours)
- Protein binding: ~50%
- Metabolism: Extensive hepatic
- Elimination half-life: 8–12 hours
- Excretion: Renal

Identifiers
- IUPAC name: 3-ethyl-3-phenyl-piperidine-2,6-dione
- CAS Number: 77-21-4
- PubChem CID: 3487
- IUPHAR/BPS: 7192
- DrugBank: DB01437
- ChemSpider: 3367
- UNII: C8I4BVN78E
- KEGG: D00532
- ChEMBL: ChEMBL1102
- CompTox Dashboard (EPA): DTXSID1023102
- ECHA InfoCard: 100.000.921

Chemical and physical data
- Formula: C_{13}H_{15}NO_{2}
- Molar mass: 217.268 g·mol^{−1}
- 3D model (JSmol): Interactive image
- Melting point: 84 °C (183 °F)
- Solubility in water: 999 mg/L (30 °C/86 °F) mg/mL (20 °C)
- SMILES: O=C1NC(CCC1(CC)C2=CC=CC=C2)=O
- InChI: InChI=1S/C13H15NO2/c1-2-13(10-6-4-3-5-7-10)9-8-11(15)14-12(13)16/h3-7H,2,8-9H2,1H3,(H,14,15,16); Key:JMBQKKAJIKAWKF-UHFFFAOYSA-N

Glutethimide (brand names included Doriden, Elrodorm, and Noxyron) is a central nervous system (CNS) depressant drug of the piperidine chemical class, one of many non-barbiturate, "barbiturate-like" GABAergic medications exhibiting general calming, relaxing, or "tranquilizing" properties in addition to relieving anxiety and promoting sleep. As such, "nerve pills" or "sleeping pills" were common vernacular descriptions of these types of medications.

== History ==
Glutethimide was developed Ciba Specialty Chemicals in 1954, and approved for medical use in the United States by the U.S. FDA in 1957. It was indicated for treating insomnia, and branded Doriden by Ciba. Generic trade names that followed included Elrodorm and Noxyron. Following the passage of the Controlled Substances Act of 1970 in the U.S., followed by the creation of the U.S. Drug Enforcement Agency (DEA) in 1973, the "war on drugs" began to prioritize the criminalization of combination drugs containing controlled substances.

The DEA declared glutethimide to be as habit-forming and addicting as barbiturates and other highly-regulated CNS depressants such as Quaalude and Placidyl. Abrupt cessation of this substance can result in rebound effects similar to those in withdrawal from any GABAergic substance, including alcohol, barbiturates and benzodiazepines.

== Chemical composition and synthesis ==
The (R) isomer has a faster onset of action and more potent anticonvulsant activity in animal models than the (S) isomer.

Synthesis: Patent:

The base catalyzed conjugate addition of 2-phenylbutyronitrile [769-68-6] (1) to ethyl acrylate (2) gives ethyl 4-cyano-4-phenylhexanoate, CID:139890735 (3). Alkaline hydrolysis of the nitrile group into an amide group, and subsequent acidic cyclization of the product affords the desired glutethimide (4).

== Mechanism of action and uses ==
Glutethimide is a CYP2D6 enzyme inducer, enabling the body to convert higher amounts of codeine to morphine, frequently leading to ingestion of glutethimide alongside codeine-containing products, such as Tylenol No. 3 or No. 4, and widespread misuse, overdose, and fatalities. Colloquially called "hits," "pancakes and syrup," or "Dors and 4s", this combination is highly potent and often lethal due to extreme respiratory depression.

In recreational quantities, any form of glutethimide was colloquially called a "Ciba" and all trade names of the medicine were manufactured as a white pill/tablet with a score line directed to be taken by mouth, and containing 500mg of the active ingredient.

During the 1980s, glutethimide became increasingly harder to access and subject to many restrictions as a CSA-classified Schedule II substance, but market demand for the product continued to exist among northeastern U.S. states and metropolitan centers, leading to the substance's clandestine "underground" manufacturing and sale, which only increased when methaqualone was fully withdrawn from the U.S. market and classified a Schedule I drug.

=== Clinical research ===
Glutethimide's effect on quickening the conversion of codeine to morphine was studied clinically, including some research in the 1970s in various countries. In these studies, it was used under carefully monitored circumstances as a form of oral opioid agonist substitution therapy, particularly as a Substitutionmittel that may be a useful alternative to methadone.

Glutethimide was available in the United States until 1993, when production ceased and it was withdrawn from the market. Since 2013, the U.S. DEA has limited annual production to three grams, equivalent to six Doriden tablets, suggesting that current use is limited to small-scale research.

== Legal status ==
=== United States ===
Glutethimide is a Schedule II drug under the Convention on Psychotropic Substances. It was originally a Schedule III drug in the United States under the Controlled Substances Act, but in 1991 it was upgraded to Schedule II, several years after it was discovered that misuse combined with codeine increased the effect of the codeine and deaths had resulted from the combination. It has a DEA ACSCN of 2550 and a 2013 production quota of 3 g.

== See also ==
- Aminoglutethimide, close relative to this substance
- Piperidione
- Methyprylon, sometimes spelled methyprylone and branded as Noludar and Dimeran
- Pyrithyldione
