= Workup =

Workup may refer to:

- Workup (chemistry), manipulations carried out after the main chemical reaction to secure the desired product
- Workup, a game of practice baseball (see scrub baseball)
