= Methylpentynol =

Chemical compound

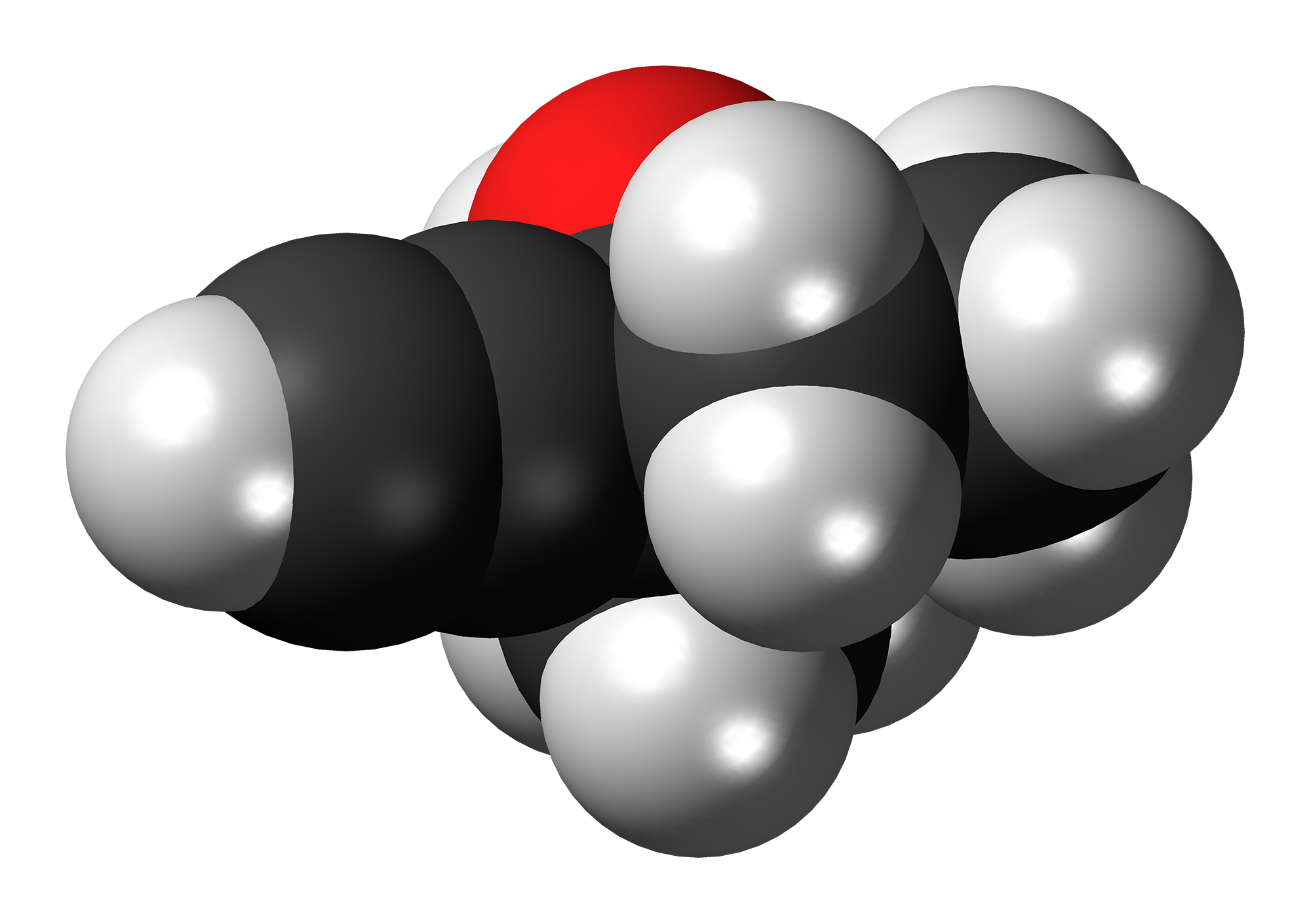

Clinical data
- Trade names: Oblivon
- Other names: Methylparafynol
- Routes of administration: By mouth
- ATC code: N05CM15 (WHO)

Legal status
- Legal status: BR: Class C1 (Other controlled substances); Withdrawn

Identifiers
- IUPAC name: 3-methylpent-1-yn-3-ol
- CAS Number: 77-75-8
- PubChem CID: 6494
- ChemSpider: 21106516
- UNII: B017BC5B1N
- CompTox Dashboard (EPA): DTXSID5021756
- ECHA InfoCard: 100.000.960

Chemical and physical data
- Formula: C_{6}H_{10}O
- Molar mass: 98.145 g·mol^{−1}
- 3D model (JSmol): Interactive image
- SMILES: CCC(C)(C#C)O
- InChI: InChI=1S/C6H10O/c1-4-6(3,7)5-2/h1,7H,5H2,2-3H3; Key:QXLPXWSKPNOQLE-UHFFFAOYSA-N

Methylpentynol (also known as methylparafynol, trade names Dormison, Atemorin, Oblivon) is a tertiary pentynol with hypnotic/sedative and anticonvulsant effects and an exceptionally low therapeutic index. It was synthesized by Bayer in 1913 and was used shortly thereafter for the treatment of insomnia, but its use was quickly phased out in response to newer drugs with far more favorable safety profiles.

The drug was marketed again in the United States, Europe and elsewhere from 1956 well into the 1960s as a rapid-acting sedative. The drug was quickly overshadowed at that point by benzodiazepines and is no longer sold anywhere.

== Synthesis ==
Methylpentynol is prepared by reaction of butanone (MEK) with sodium acetylide in liquid ammonia. This reaction must be done in anhydrous conditions and in an inert atmosphere.

== Applications ==
As building block in the synthesis of:

1. Phthalofyne (1,2-Benzenedicarboxylic acid, mono(1-ethyl-1-methyl-2-propynyl) ester) [131-67-9]
2. Anansiol (1-ethyl-1-methylprop-2-ynyl carbamate) [302-66-9]
3. Bason ( 2-Bromoethynyl-2-butanol) [2028-52-6]

== See also ==
- Clocental
- Ethchlorvynol
