= Chlorphenesin carbamate =

Centrally acting muscle relaxant

Clinical data
- Trade names: Maolate, Musil, Rinlaxer

Identifiers
- IUPAC name: (3-(4-Chlorophenoxy)-2-hydroxypropyl) carbamate
- CAS Number: 886-74-8
- PubChem CID: 2724
- ChemSpider: 2623
- UNII: 57U5YI11WP
- KEGG: D00770
- ChEBI: CHEBI:3643
- ChEMBL: ChEMBL607709
- CompTox Dashboard (EPA): DTXSID5022803
- ECHA InfoCard: 100.011.777

Chemical and physical data
- Formula: C_{10}H_{12}ClNO_{4}
- Molar mass: 245.66 g·mol^{−1}
- 3D model (JSmol): Interactive image
- Melting point: 86–92 °C (187–198 °F)
- SMILES: C1=CC(=CC=C1OCC(COC(=O)N)O)Cl
- InChI: InChI=1S/C10H12ClNO4/c11-7-1-3-9(4-2-7)15-5-8(13)6-16-10(12)14/h1-4,8,13H,5-6H2,(H2,12,14); Key:SKPLBLUECSEIFO-UHFFFAOYSA-N

Chlorphenesin carbamate (marketed as Maolate, Musil, and Rinlaxer) is a central nervous system skeletal muscle relaxant used to treat muscle pain and spasms. It is the carbamate ester of chlorphenesin. Chlorphenesin carbamate has a longer biological half-life than the related muscle relaxant methocarbamol and produces central nervous system effects, including sedation, that methocarbamol does not at comparable doses. It is no longer marketed in the United States; the FDA withdrew approval of the sole remaining new drug application in 2020 after the holder repeatedly failed to file required annual reports.

== Pharmacology ==
Chlorphenesin carbamate acts as a selective blocker of polysynaptic reflex pathways at both spinal and supraspinal levels. In spinalized rats, intravenous administration inhibited both the monosynaptic and polysynaptic spinal reflex, with the polysynaptic reflex more strongly depressed; unlike mephenesin, it did not affect the dorsal root potential evoked by dorsal root stimulation, though both drugs reduced motoneuron excitability.

Broader motor-system studies across species found the compound decreased grip strength and inhibited corneal and pinna reflexes in mice, produced longer-lasting protection than mephenesin against picrotoxin-, pentylenetetrazol-, and electroshock-induced convulsions, and suppressed oxotremorine-induced tremor; however, unlike mephenesin it showed no anti-strychnine effect. The same study reported inhibition of spinal reflex activity in rats, chicks, and frogs with a longer duration of action than mephenesin, and depression of both intercollicular and ischemic decerebrate rigidity.

=== Antinociception ===
In adjuvant-induced arthritic rats, chlorphenesin carbamate produced an antinociceptive effect distinct from its muscle-relaxant activity, suggesting a role in pain modulation independent of spasmolysis.

=== Pharmacokinetics ===
A comparative pharmacokinetic study in humans found the mean biological half-life of chlorphenesin carbamate to be 3.14 hours, significantly longer than the 1.20 hours measured for methocarbamol. A later randomized, single-dose, two-period crossover trial in healthy Korean volunteers assessed the relative bioavailability of generic and branded 250 mg and 500 mg oral chlorphenesin carbamate tablets, supporting continued generic manufacture and clinical use of the drug outside the United States.

== Clinical studies ==
A controlled clinical trial compared the effects of chlorphenesin carbamate and carisoprodol on psychological test scores in patients treated for musculoskeletal conditions.

== Regulatory history ==
Chlorphenesin carbamate was marketed in the United States as Maolate as 400 mg tablets formulations by Pan American Laboratories. In March 2020, the Food and Drug Administration withdrew approval on the grounds that the holders had repeatedly failed to submit required annual reports. The drug's availability in the United States is now listed as discontinued.

== Current research ==
As of 2025, chlorphenesin carbamate is under investigation in combination with hydroxychloroquine and modified FOLFIRINOX chemotherapy in a clinical trial for locally advanced or metastatic pancreatic cancer, reflecting continued research interest beyond its original indication.
