= Demoxepam =

Chemical compound

Pharmacokinetic data
- Elimination half-life: 35–40 hours

Identifiers
- IUPAC name: 7-Chloro-1,3-dihydro-5-phenyl-2H-1,4-benzodiazepin-2-one-4-oxide
- CAS Number: 963-39-3
- PubChem CID: 13756
- ChemSpider: 10441314
- UNII: 8X1XP5M0SB
- KEGG: D02600
- ChEMBL: ChEMBL1597677
- CompTox Dashboard (EPA): DTXSID4046155
- ECHA InfoCard: 100.012.287

Chemical and physical data
- Formula: C_{15}H_{11}ClN_{2}O_{2}
- Molar mass: 286.71 g·mol^{−1}
- 3D model (JSmol): Interactive image
- SMILES: ClC1=CC2=C(NC(C[N+]([O-])=C2C3=CC=CC=C3)=O)C=C1
- InChI: InChI=1S/C15H11ClN2O2/c16-11-6-7-13-12(8-11)15(10-4-2-1-3-5-10)18(20)9-14(19)17-13/h1-8H,9H2,(H,17,19); Key:GGRWZBVSUZZMKS-UHFFFAOYSA-N

Demoxepam is a drug which is a benzodiazepine derivative. It is a metabolite of chlordiazepoxide and has anticonvulsant properties and presumably other characteristic benzodiazepine properties.

== See also ==
- Benzodiazepine
- Chlordiazepoxide
