= Methyprylon =

Chemical compound

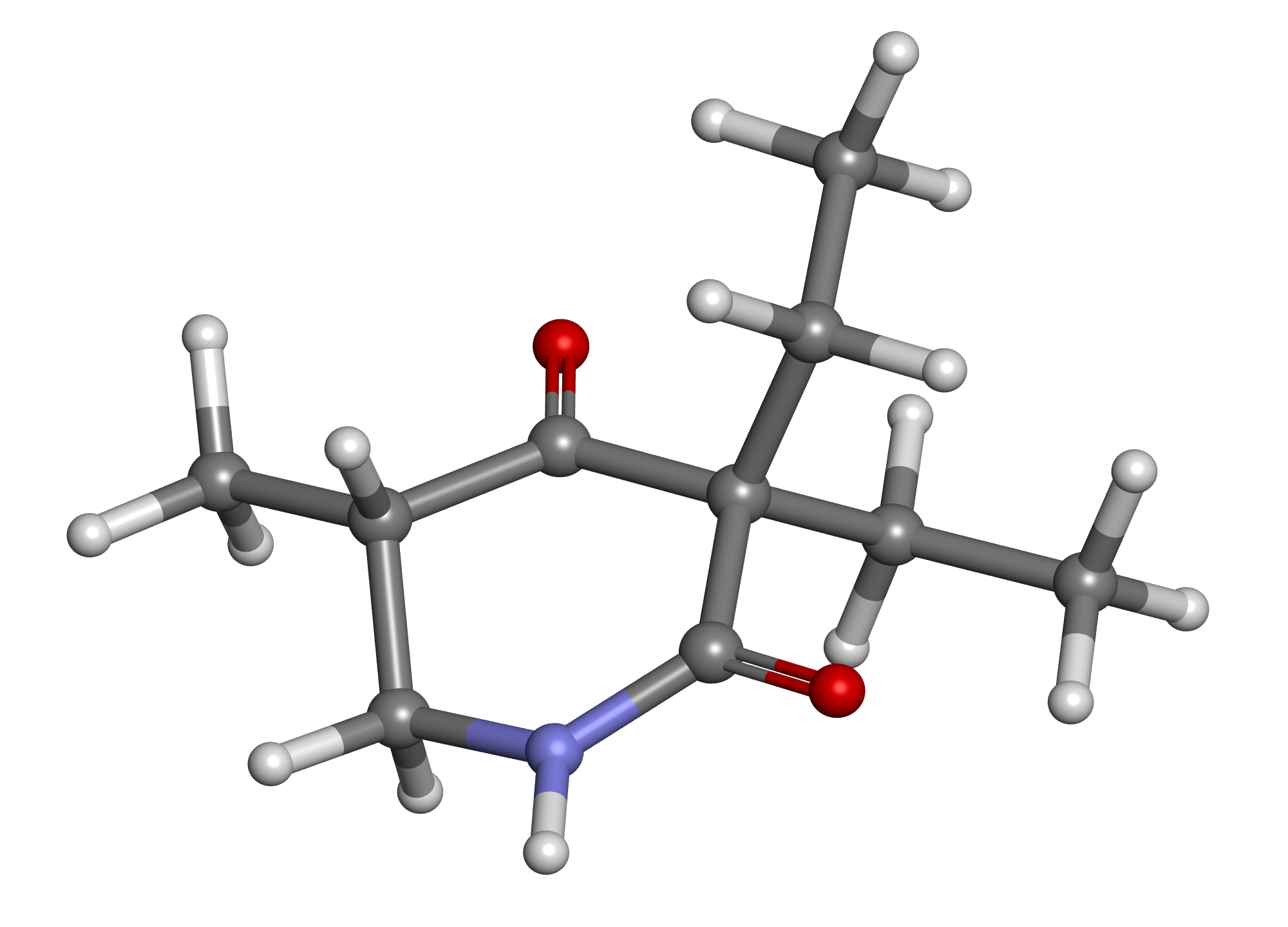

Clinical data
- Trade names: Noludar, Dimerin, Noctan, Methyprylone
- Routes of administration: By mouth
- ATC code: N05CE02 (WHO)

Legal status
- Legal status: BR: Class B1 (Psychoactive drugs)

Pharmacokinetic data
- Protein binding: 60%
- Elimination half-life: 6–16 hours

Identifiers
- IUPAC name: (RS)-3,3-diethyl-5-methylpiperidine-2,4-dione
- CAS Number: 125-64-4
- PubChem CID: 4162
- IUPHAR/BPS: 7238
- DrugBank: DB01107
- ChemSpider: 4018
- UNII: CUT48I42ON
- KEGG: D01150
- ChEMBL: ChEMBL1200790
- CompTox Dashboard (EPA): DTXSID7023306
- ECHA InfoCard: 100.004.315

Chemical and physical data
- Formula: C_{10}H_{17}NO_{2}
- Molar mass: 183.251 g·mol^{−1}
- 3D model (JSmol): Interactive image
- Chirality: Racemic mixture
- SMILES: CCC1(CC)C(=O)NCC(C)C1=O
- InChI: InChI=1S/C10H17NO2/c1-4-10(5-2)8(12)7(3)6-11-9(10)13/h7H,4-6H2,1-3H3,(H,11,13); Key:SIDLZWOQUZRBRU-UHFFFAOYSA-N

Methyprylon, ormethyprylone is a piperidinedione derivative and CNS depressant drug marketed by Hoffmann-La Roche in the 1950s, marketed under the trade name Noludar and advertised as treatment of insomnia as a nonbarbiturate. According to the Encyclopedia of Toxicology (2005), methyprylon was withdrawn from the United States market in 1988.

== Pharmacokinetics ==
A study of single oral doses of 300 mg in healthy volunteers found that a zero-order absorption model best fit the pharmacokinetic data. Mean (+/- SD) values for the elimination half-life (9.2 +/- 2.2 hours), apparent clearance (11.91 +/- 4.42 mL/h/kg), and apparent steady-state volume of distribution (0.97 +/- 0.33 L/kg) were reported.

A case report examining methyprylon overdose found that elimination kinetics were not concentration dependent. The authors suggested that saturation or inhibition of metabolic pathways could explain the observed nonlinear elimination. The therapeutic-dose half-life was considered inappropriate for intoxicated patients and could underestimate the time required to reach safe plasma concentrations.

== History ==
=== Research & development ===
Methyprylon was developed by Hoffmann-La Roche in the early 1950s, culminating research beginning in the 1940s as part of a search for nonbarbiturate sedative-hypnotics. Patented in the United States in 1954,

=== Approval ===
It was introduced in clinical practice in 1955, marketed under several trade names Roche marketed it as Noludar in North America and the United Kingdom, Noctan in France and Francophone, and as Dimerin in parts of Central Europe. Following the emergence of newer central nervous system depressants with superior therapeutic profiles, these regional variants were progressively phased out, culminating in its final commercial withdrawal from the Canadian market in September 1990.

=== Clinical use ===
Early clinical reports described methyprylon as a nonbarbiturate soporific that reliably promoted sleep, and a comparatively mild alternative to barbiturate hypnotics, which were then widely used in clinical practice.

Following its introduction, methyprylon was evaluated in a variety of clinical settings involving insomnia associated with underlying medical conditions. A 1962 study examined its use in chronic insomniac patients with various physical disorders and reported improvements in sleep among patients with conditions including gastrointestinal disorders, cardiovascular disease, pulmonary disease, diabetes mellitus, epilepsy, alcoholism, cirrhosis, and other chronic illnesses.

== Adverse effects ==
Despite early reports describing methyprylon as an effective hypnotic, concerns regarding intoxication and dependence became increasingly apparent during the following decade. Reports of overdose, suicide attempts, and dependence contributed to a changing assessment of its safety profile. Reports of serious intoxication began appearing in the medical literature as early as 1956. That year, the New England Journal of Medicine published a report describing the first fatal poisoning associated with methyprylon. During the following decade, additional reports documented overdose, suicide attempts, and dependence associated with methyprylon use.

== Decline and discontinuation ==
By the 1970s, methyprylon had largely been replaced by benzodiazepines and their derivatives. A 1976 clinical comparison of methyprylon with triazolam described methyprylon as rarely used and noted that newer drugs, including benzodiazepines, had become preferred alternatives because of their clinical advantages and fewer adverse effects. According to the Encyclopedia of Toxicology (2005), the substance was withdrawn from the United States market in 1988.

== See also ==
- Glutethimide
- Pyrithyldione
- Phenglutarimide
