= Ethchlorvynol =

Sedative-hypnotic drug

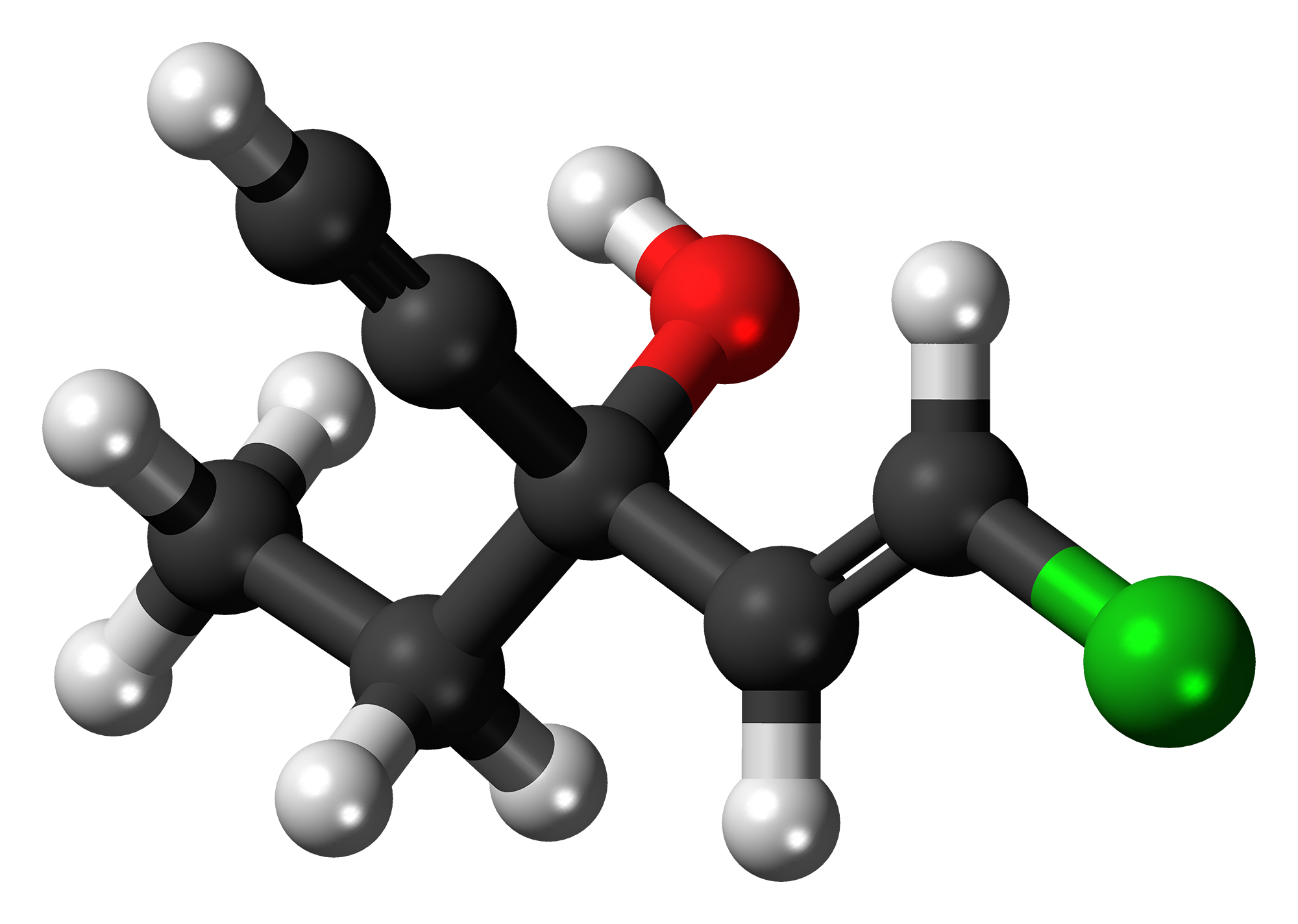

Clinical data
- Pronunciation: /ˌɛθklɔːrˈvaɪnɒl/ ETH-klor-VY-nol
- AHFS/Drugs.com: Micromedex Detailed Consumer Information
- Routes of administration: Oral
- ATC code: N05CM08 (WHO)

Legal status
- Legal status: BR: Class B1 (Psychoactive drugs); CA: Schedule IV; DE: Anlage II (Authorized trade only, not prescriptible); UK: Class C; US: Schedule IV

Pharmacokinetic data
- Protein binding: 35–50%

Identifiers
- IUPAC name: 1-chloro-3-ethylpent-1-en-4-yn-3-ol
- CAS Number: 113-18-8
- PubChem CID: 5281077
- IUPHAR/BPS: 7180
- DrugBank: DB00189
- ChemSpider: 4444534
- UNII: 6EIM3851UZ
- KEGG: D00704
- ChEMBL: ChEMBL591
- CompTox Dashboard (EPA): DTXSID2023010
- ECHA InfoCard: 100.239.078

Chemical and physical data
- Formula: C_{7}H_{9}ClO
- Molar mass: 144.60 g·mol^{−1}
- 3D model (JSmol): Interactive image
- SMILES: Cl[C@H]=CC(C#C)(O)CC
- InChI: InChI=1S/C7H9ClO/c1-3-7(9,4-2)5-6-8/h1,5-6,9H,4H2,2H3/b6-5+; Key:ZEHYJZXQEQOSON-AATRIKPKSA-N

Ethchlorvynol is a GABA_{A} receptor positive allosteric modulator with hypnotic and sedative properties, first developed by Pfizer in the 1950s. In the United States, it was sold by Abbott Laboratories under the trade name Placidyl. Placidyl was available in 200 mg, 500 mg, and 750 mg strength gel-filled capsules. The 500 mg and 750 mg capsules were intended to reduce sleep latency, while the 200 mg capsule was intended to re-induce sleep in cases of early awakening. Abbott discontinued production in 1999, largely because benzodiazepines (such as Librium and Valium) had replaced non-barbiturate sedatives in clinical practice; by the end of 2001 remaining supplies in the United States had been exhausted.

== Use and effects ==
Ethchlorvynol was indicated to treat insomnia and was widely prescribed in the 1960s and 1970s. Its exact mechanism of action is not fully established, but it appears to depress the central nervous system through modulation of GABA_{A} receptors, in a manner broadly similar to barbiturates. Prescriptions had fallen significantly by 1990 as newer hypnotics considered safer in overdose, particularly benzodiazepines, became standard of care.

The drug developed a notable street reputation — capsules were colloquially known as "jelly-bellies" — and concerns about dependence and misuse were recognised early. During the late 1970s ethchlorvynol was sometimes overprescribed, contributing to cases of rapid dependence. A prominent example is that of U.S. Supreme Court Chief Justice William Rehnquist, who began taking Placidyl for insomnia following back surgery in 1971. By 1981 he was reportedly consuming approximately 1,500 mg nightly — three times the standard starting dose. After checking into George Washington University Hospital in December 1981, abrupt discontinuation triggered severe withdrawal: FBI records later revealed that Rehnquist experienced paranoid delusions, reported hearing voices outside his room, and attempted to leave the hospital in his pyjamas. Physicians reintroduced the drug at a high dose and tapered it gradually; he was fully weaned off Placidyl by early 1982.

== History and availability ==
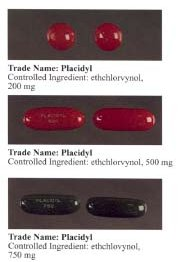
Placidyl capsules, as displayed by the U.S. Drug Enforcement Administration

By the late 1990s the clinical use of ethchlorvynol had sharply declined owing to the widespread availability of newer sedative-hypnotics with more favourable safety profiles, particularly the benzodiazepines and non-benzodiazepine "Z-drugs." Commercial manufacturing of both the brand-name Placidyl by Abbott Laboratories and the generic formulation by Banner Pharmacaps permanently ceased in late 1999. The FDA's administrative history of the drug formally concluded when the Food and Drug Administration published a notice in the Federal Register withdrawing approval of NDA 010021 (Placidyl capsules, Abbott Laboratories), published 19 March 2012 with an effective date of 18 April 2012, at Abbott's own request because the product was no longer marketed.

Although ethchlorvynol could theoretically be manufactured for sale in the United States by another pharmaceutical company subject to FDA approval, no company has chosen to do so. Individuals holding a valid prescription may legally transport a reasonable amount into the United States.

Outside the United States, ethchlorvynol was also marketed in combination with diphenhydramine, a first-generation antihistamine with independent sedative properties, under the trade name Finorgal. The combination was the subject of clinical evaluation; a 1979 double-blind crossover trial in thirty patients with insomnia found Finorgal comparable to nitrazepam and triclofos sodium in terms of sleep induction, duration, and quality, with side effects reported less frequently than with either comparator. A concurrent placebo-controlled trial of the same preparation confirmed its hypnotic efficacy over placebo.

== Legal status ==
Ethchlorvynol is subject to varying degrees of international and domestic restriction depending on jurisdiction:

- International: Under the 1971 UN Convention on Psychotropic Substances, ethchlorvynol is classified as a Schedule IV psychotropic substance.
- United States: It remains a Schedule IV controlled substance under the Controlled Substances Act, legal to possess only with a valid medical prescription, despite its commercial unavailability.
- Canada: Classified as Schedule IV under the Controlled Drugs and Substances Act.
- United Kingdom: Class C under the Misuse of Drugs Act 1971.
- Germany: Listed under Anlage II of the Betäubungsmittelgesetz.
- Brazil: The National Health Surveillance Agency (Anvisa) lists ethchlorvynol under "Lista B1" (Psychotropic Substances), subjecting any pharmaceutical preparations to mandatory prescription retention and strict regulatory oversight.

== Adverse effects ==
Along with expected sedative effects such as relaxation and drowsiness, reported adverse effects of ethchlorvynol include gastrointestinal upset (nausea and vomiting), dizziness, blurred or altered vision, numbness or tingling, and unsteadiness or impaired coordination. Hypersensitivity reactions such as skin rash have also been reported.

Misuse by injection has been associated with serious acute toxicity. Reports describe severe non-cardiogenic pulmonary oedema and haemodynamic effects following intravenous injection, and public health sources have warned of cardiovascular or pulmonary injury arising from improper intravenous or intra-arterial injection.

=== Overdose ===
There is no specific antidote for ethchlorvynol overdose; management is primarily supportive and broadly parallels the approach used for other sedative-hypnotic overdoses, with particular attention to airway, breathing, and circulation. Reported features include confusion, slurred speech, unsteady gait, respiratory depression, and slow heartbeat; severe poisoning may progress to coma and death. In cases of massive ingestion, enhanced elimination techniques such as hemodialysis have been reported as adjuncts to supportive care.

=== Withdrawal ===
Prolonged or high-dose use of ethchlorvynol can produce physical dependence, and abrupt discontinuation may result in a significant withdrawal syndrome. Case reports describe confusion and perceptual disturbances as well as severe presentations involving psychosis, delirium, and seizures; onset may be delayed following cessation. Severe ethchlorvynol withdrawal resembles that of other sedative-hypnotic drugs and may carry a risk of life-threatening complications without appropriate medical management.

== Chemistry ==
Ethchlorvynol is a member of the class of sedative-hypnotic carbinols, which includes methylparafynol and tert-amyl alcohol. It is not a benzodiazepine, carbamate, or barbiturate, and its molecular structure is considerably simpler. The systematic name is usually given as ethyl 2-chlorovinyl ethynyl carbinol or 1-chloro-3-ethylpent-1-en-4-yn-3-ol. Its empirical formula is C_{7}H_{9}ClO.

Ethchlorvynol is synthesised by an ethynylation reaction using lithium acetylide and 1-chloro-1-penten-3-one in liquid ammonia, followed by acidic workup.

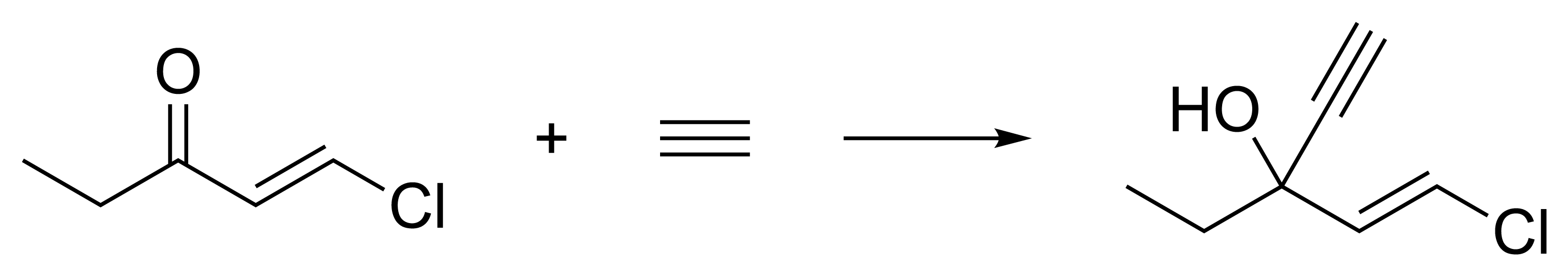
