= Geriatrics (disambiguation) =

Geriatrics is a medical specialty focused on providing care for the unique health needs of the elderly.

Geriatrics may also refer to:

- Geriatrics (Advanstar Communications journal), the official journal of the American Geriatrics Society published from 1946 to 2009 by Advanstar Communications
- Geriatrics (MDPI journal), abbreviated Geriatrics (Basel), published by MDPI
