= Geriatric medicine in Egypt =

Overview article

Geriatric medicine, as a speciality, was introduced in Egypt in 1982, and in 1984 a geriatrics and gerontology unit in Ain Shams University Faculty of Medicine was established.

== Egyptian history ==
Many ancient physicians were interested in the field of geriatrics and some of them wrote separate books on this subject. Abu Ali Ibn-Sina Avicenna's The Canon of Medicine (1025) was the first book to offer instruction for the care of the aged. In a chapter entitled "Regimen of Old Age", Avicenna was concerned with how "old folk need plenty of sleep", how their bodies should be anointed with oil, and recommended exercises such as walking or horse-riding. Thesis III of the Canon discussed the diet suitable for old people, and dedicated several sections to elderly patients who become constipated.

Also the famous Physician Ibn Al-Jazzar (Algizar) Al-Qayrawani (circa 898–980) wrote a special book on the medicine and health of elderly (Kitab Tibb Al Machayikh) or (Teb Al-Mashaikh wa hefz sehatahom). Also a book on sleep disorders and another one on forgetfulness and how to strengthen memory (Kitab Al Nissian wa Toroq Taqwiati Adhakira) and a Treatise on causes of mortality (Rissala Fi Asbab Al Wafah). Another Arabic physician in the 9th century, Ishaq ibn Hunayn (died in 910) wrote a Treatise on Drugs for Forgetfulness (Risalah al-Shafiyah fi adwiyat al-nisyan)

== Current situation ==
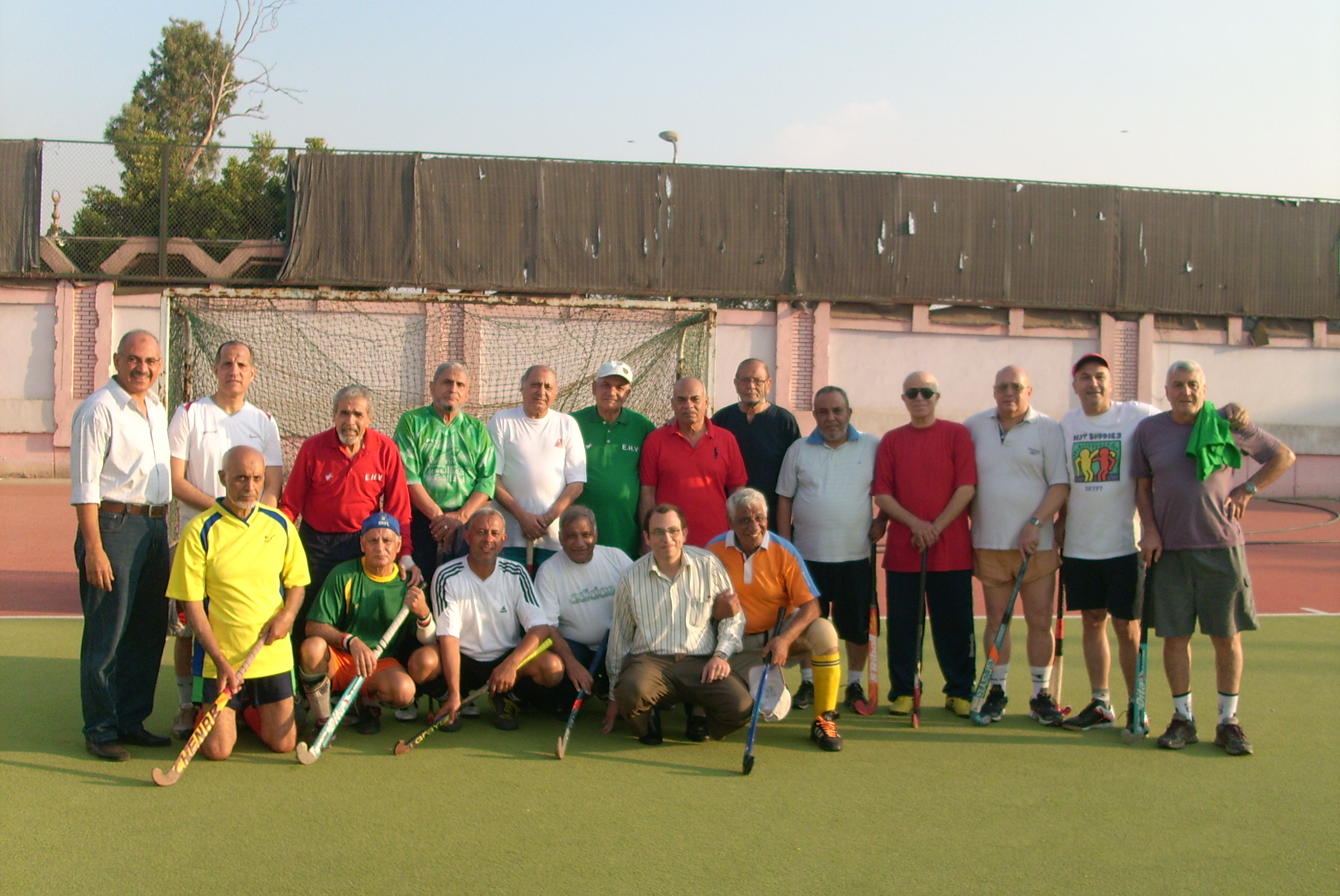
Active agers of the Egyptian Hockey veterans association.

Covering the cost of healthcare is a major challenge for seniors (defined as 60 years or older in Egypt). Currently, 62 percent of elderly men have health insurance compared to 35 percent of elderly women. However, medical care for the elderly, in the absence of a comprehensive health insurance plan, is extremely expensive. Few hospitals have wings just for the elderly, two percent of whom have a permanent disability (i.e., 81,000 people). There are only 52 physical therapy centers in Egypt serving 1,258 of those over 60.

Geriatric teaching programs were available in Egypt.

== Geriatrics governmental services ==
=== Egyptian Universities ===
==== Beni-Suef University ====
===== National Institute for Longevity Elderly Sciences NILES =====
  - established in 2016 by approval from the Higher Council of Education in Egypt
  - Scientific departments of the institute:
    - 1. Department of Geriatric Medicine
    - 2. Department of Geriatric Nursing
    - 3. Department of Geriatric Physical Therapy
    - 4. Department of Geriatric Occupational Therapy
    - 5. Department of Geriatric Nutrition
    - 6. Department of Geriatric Psychology
    - 7. Department of Elderly Engineering and Environmental Studies
    - 8. Department of Elderly Social Studies
    - 9. Department of Elderly sporting and recreation
    - 10. Department of Elderly Arts
    - 11. Department of Geriatric Dentistry
    - 12. Department of Elderly Tourism
    - 13. Department of Geriatric Rehabilitation Nursing
    - 14. Department of Geriatric Economy
    - 15. Department of Geriatric Oestopathy
    - 16. Department of ELderly Laws and Legalizations
    - 17. Department of Geriatric Ophthalmology
    - 18. Department of Geriatric Optometry
    - 19. Department of Elderly Media and communications
    - http://www.bsu.edu.eg/Sector_Home.aspx?cat_id=42
  - NILES journal for Geriatric and Gerontology **
    - is a scientific journal that publishes original manuscripts in the different disciplines of the geriatrics and gerontology. The journal vision is to enrich scientific knowledge related to elderly life.
    - https://niles.journals.ekb.eg/

==== Ain Shams University Geriatric medicine department ====
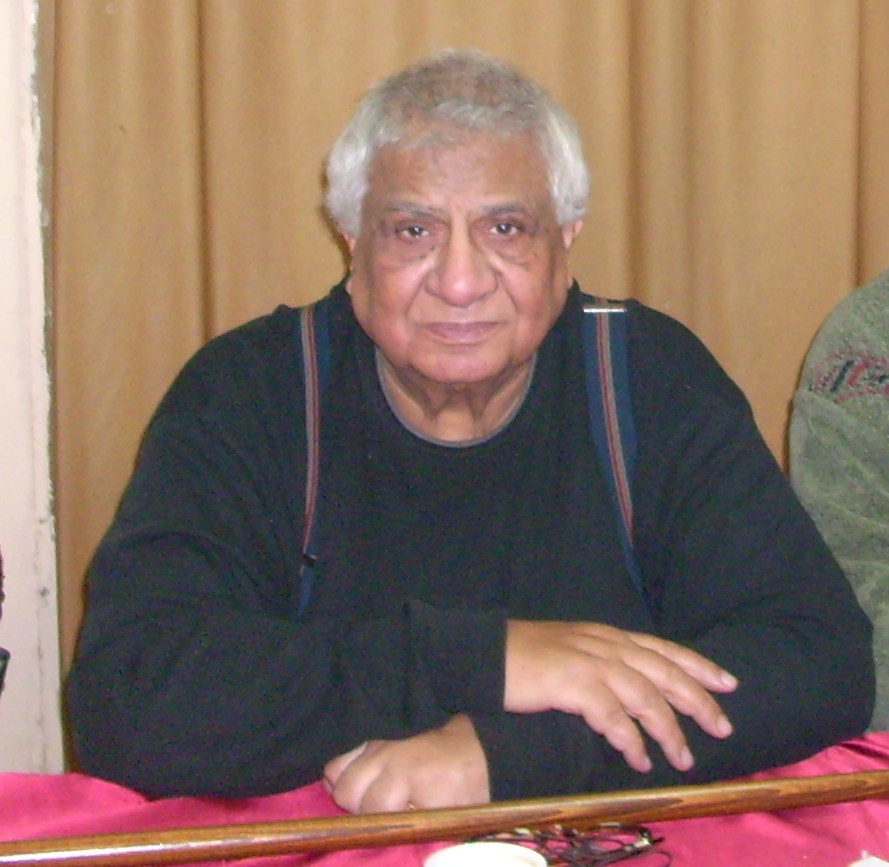
Prof. Abdel-Moniem Ashour in 2010

  - The first modern Egyptian book on Geriatric Medicine was by Professor Dr Mohammed Sabbour in 1979 Professor of Internal Medicine, Ain Shams Faculty of Medicine, who was the first head the Egyptian Geriatrics & Gerontology society in 1982.
  - It started as an outpatient clinic in 25/6/1984 by Dr. Abdelmoneim Ashour (1934–2015) the professor of Geriatric psychiatry, then became a Clinical Unit in 1990 then became an academic department in 1996 having its own inpatient department(23 beds)(Coordinates: 30°4'26"N 31°16'33"E), outpatient clinic, follow-up clinic and residents and issuing academic degrees (M.Sc., M.D)in geriatric medicine.
  - During the period from 1992 to 1997 there was a US-Egyptian Partnership Between the University of Minnesota and Ain Shams University Bilateral Research on Training in Geriatrics Funded by the Fulbright Commission. Named as the Fulbright Bi-National Commission Partnership Project with Ain Shams University, Minneapolis, MN and Cairo, Egypt
  - During the 1990s the department had visiting professorships
    - Kenneth Hepburn January, 1995 & February, 1998
    - Richerd Reed
    - James Pacala
    - Peter Millard
    - Laura Efinger Occupational Therapist 2010
  - In 2002 the department established a 12 beds Geriatric Intensive care unit (GICU).
  - The department has partnership with United Nations' International Institute of Aging (INIA) in Malta to carry out short-term training programmes in Cairo specifically designed for personnel from the Arab World working in the field of Ageing. The two organisations have also agreed to collaborate in identifying, setting up and implementing projects in the field of Ageing both in the Mediterranean region and in the Arab World.
  - The clinical unit has around 20–25 acute assessment beds, usually for Comprehensive Geriatric Assessment (CGA). The unit has interdisciplinary team which works in the assessment stage as well as in the implementing the care plan. The unit has the availability of free medications as well as free medical investigation. The unit is one of 2 clinical units in Egypt in which the clinical service is run by qualified geriatricians.
  - In 2002 the Geriatrics Intensive care unit or high dependency unit was opened in the clinical unit. This unit has 8 beds and is offering a clinical service for the seriously ill elderly patients. This unit offers subsidized service as regard medications and investigation. However, poor patient could get a free service through the ministry of health paying a contribution for treatment. This service is run by qualified geriatricians.
  - Also the department the Osteoporosis Unit This unit offers a diagnostic and a therapeutic service for older patient with generalized bone ache or a suspected diagnosis of the condition.
  - In 2009 a Diploma in Geriatric Medicine, was approved beside the Master of Science degree and Doctoral Degree in Geriatric Medicine.
  - In 2009 the name of the department was changed to Geriatrics & Gerontology department.
  - The department staff provide Academic services & teaching in Ain Shams Faculty of Medicine, Ain Shams High Institute of Nursing & Other University program in Egypt The British University in Egypt (BTE), Misr University of Science & Technology University and 6th bof October University.
  - In 2008 the Geriatrics & Gerontology department started cooperation with the Pharmacology Department in establishing the Clinical Pharmacology Unit and starting a weekly clinical pharmacology round.

==== Alexandria University ====
  - Faculty of medicine contain a Geriatrics Unit since the 1970s
  - A biweekly geriatrics Outpatient clinic is also available
  - The department have a cooperation with the Geriatric Nursing department of the Faculty of Nursing.
  - Elder health section of the family health department of the High Institute of Public Health of Alexandria University.
  - Postgraduate Program in Geriatric Nursing in the Faculty of Nursing.

==== Mansoura University ====
  - Has established its own Geriatrics Unit
  - Inpatient department consists of 2 beds affiliated to the Endocrinology Unit.
  - Geriatric Medicine Residency Program has started since 2006 in Mansura University in Cooperation with the Ain Shams Geriatrics & Gerontology department. Three residents has joined the program until 2009.
  - The department has started a weekly geriatrics outpatient clinic.

==== Helwan University Center for Elderly Social & Health Care ====
- The Center of Elderly Social & Health Care (CEC) was established in 1996.
- The center is a self-financed unit under the umbrella of the center for community development in Helwan University.
- The main objective of the center is to provide both the clinical service for older Egyptians as well as trying to develop a geriatric care model which could be transferred to other institutions and organizations involved in older people care in Egypt.
- The Center Provide Long Term Care service.

==== Cairo University ====
- Geriatric Medicine is a subspeciality of Internal Medicine Department, teaching geriatrics as a part of undergraduate and postgraduate Internal Medicine curriculum. Geriatric Medicine Unit provides outpatient clinic service as well as inpatient consultation for the university hospitals.
- Faculty of Medicine has the geriatrics speciality included in the public health department, but geriatrics is not a separate entity. It is included in the family medicine curriculum & Family medicine M.Sc.
- Psychogeriatrics Unit is being established in the psychiatry department.

==== Assuit University ====
- Faculty of Medicine is currently establishing a Geriatric Medicine department.

==== Tanta University ====
- A Psychogeriatrics Unit was established in 2008.
- The Tanta Faculty of Medicine has organised a conference on Geriatric Medicine in 2009.
- The Faculty of Nursing has a Post-Graduate Program for Geriatric Nursing.

==== Suez Canal University ====
- Faculty of Medicine has a family medicine department that teaches geriatric medicine course in the undergraduate curse of the first year.
- Also the Geriatrics module is taught in the postgraduate course of the master's degree and the doctorate degree in family medicine.

==== Sohag University ====
- Has a Geriatric Health Curriculum taught in the Faculty of Nursing, in the Program of Geriatric Nursing.

==== Geriatric Medicine department at The International Medical center ====
- The International Medical center at Cairo-Ismaïlia road.
- It was established by the Ain Shams Geriatrics & Gerontology department in cooperation with the Physical Medicine department.
- Inpatient ward consists of 12 bed (Inpatient admission and Day-care service), Geriatrics outpatient clinic, Geriatric Medical Check up Program in collaboration with Physical Medicine department since October 2008.

==== Police Hospital of Alexandria ====
- Geriatric Medicine department was established with the help of Alexandria University Geriatric Unit.

=== Egyptian Ministry of Health and Population ===
==== Ministry of Health and Population ====
- In 2002, The number of hospital beds in Egypt was around 141,000, of which about 93,000 beds (66%) were affiliated to the Ministry of Health and Population. The total number of beds for elder people was 3856. The health services were distributed all over the country. In each governorate (province), there are the three levels of health care, primary, secondary and tertiary; but the geriatric specialty is presented mostly in Cairo, and a few big cities. The ministry of health and population started from 2001 to develop health programs targeting older people within its structure.
  - In 2002, The number of specialized physicians was about 38,001 including just only 70 specialists in geriatric medicine. The number of consultants in geriatric medicine was around 12 and are mainly based in the capital of Egypt. As regarding health insurance there are 352 units which are mainly clinics (202), beneficiaries are 7.5 million in which pensioners and widows 1.8 million. Despite such high percentage of older people there is no geriatric specialist or consultant with the health insurance agency.
- In 2007 the Egyptian Ministry of Health & Population (MOHP) announced its plan to recruit 89 doctors in 2008 to work as geriatricians.
- Al-Matariyyah teaching hospital and Elsahel teaching hospital are establishing its departments.
- Boulaq Al-Dakror Hospital opened a new department in 2007.
- Elderly rehabilitation & treatment center in Helwan (26 beds) one of the single speciality centers of ministry of health and population.
- The national institute of neuromotor disabilities also contain a geriatrics outpatient clinic.
- Egyptian fellowship of family medicine& Egyptian fellowship of Internal medicine curricula includes a training module on Geriatric medicine as a part of the Egyptian fellowship programs provided by the Ministry of health and Population.
- Government Medical Insurance healthcare: Covering the cost of healthcare is another major challenge for seniors. Currently, 62 percent of elderly men have health insurance compared to 35 percent of elderly women. However, medical care for the elderly, in the absence of a comprehensive health insurance plan, is extremely expensive. Few hospitals have wings just for the elderly, two percent of whom have a permanent disability (that's 81,000 people). There are only 52 physical therapy centers in Egypt serving 1,258 of those over 60. In May 2009 Medical insurance needs plan, the Medical Insurance sector dedicated zero beds to Geriatrics Care and needed zero doctors.
- Egyptian Medical Syndicate has more than 40 registered Geriatricians (with Postgraduate studies in Ain Shams University or from Abroad)

== Geriatric medicine education in Egypt ==
- Geriatric Medicine: Until 1988 there was no specialized study in Geriatric medicine. It started in Ain Shams University Faculty of Medicine at the post graduate level as master's degree in Geriatric Medicine which is a taught course in geriatric medicine and a research topic. It is obtained through a written examination, a clinical examination in geriatric medicine. Also there is a doctorate degree in geriatric medicine, in which it has clinical and written examinations and the student also has to choose a research topic as a partial fulfillment to obtain the degree.
- Geriatric Physical Therapy education: Physical therapy education is available in three universities, The study of geriatrics is introduced at the third year undergraduate for two terms. Higher degree studies are available to attain higher diploma, Masters and Ph.D. degrees in geriatric Internal medicine and geriatrics.
- Geriatric Nursing education: At the colleges of nursing in many universities there is a module in geriatrics nursing both at the undergraduate level as well as postgraduate level at the diploma level, M.Sc. In geriatric nursing and Ph.D. in geriatric nursing. most of these degrees are obtained by studying specialized courses and attending seminars, choose the research topic and do the written examination and an oral examination.
- The Higher Institute For Public Health Alexandria University: This is a postgraduate institute for public health. This institute there are 9 academic departments from which one is especially for family health. One of these departments is the department of Health at old age. This department offers postgraduate training in geriatric health at the diploma level, Master's degree level and Ph.D. degree level in public health.

== Geriatric care physicians ==
- As in many countries, there are three categories of geriatric care physicians:
  - Geriatricians, who hold a postgraduate certificate/degree in Geriatric Medicine,
  - Family Medicine and Internal Medicine Practitioners, who carry a Continuous Medical Education (CME) credit in Geriatrics,
  - General Practitioners.

== Geriatrics societies ==
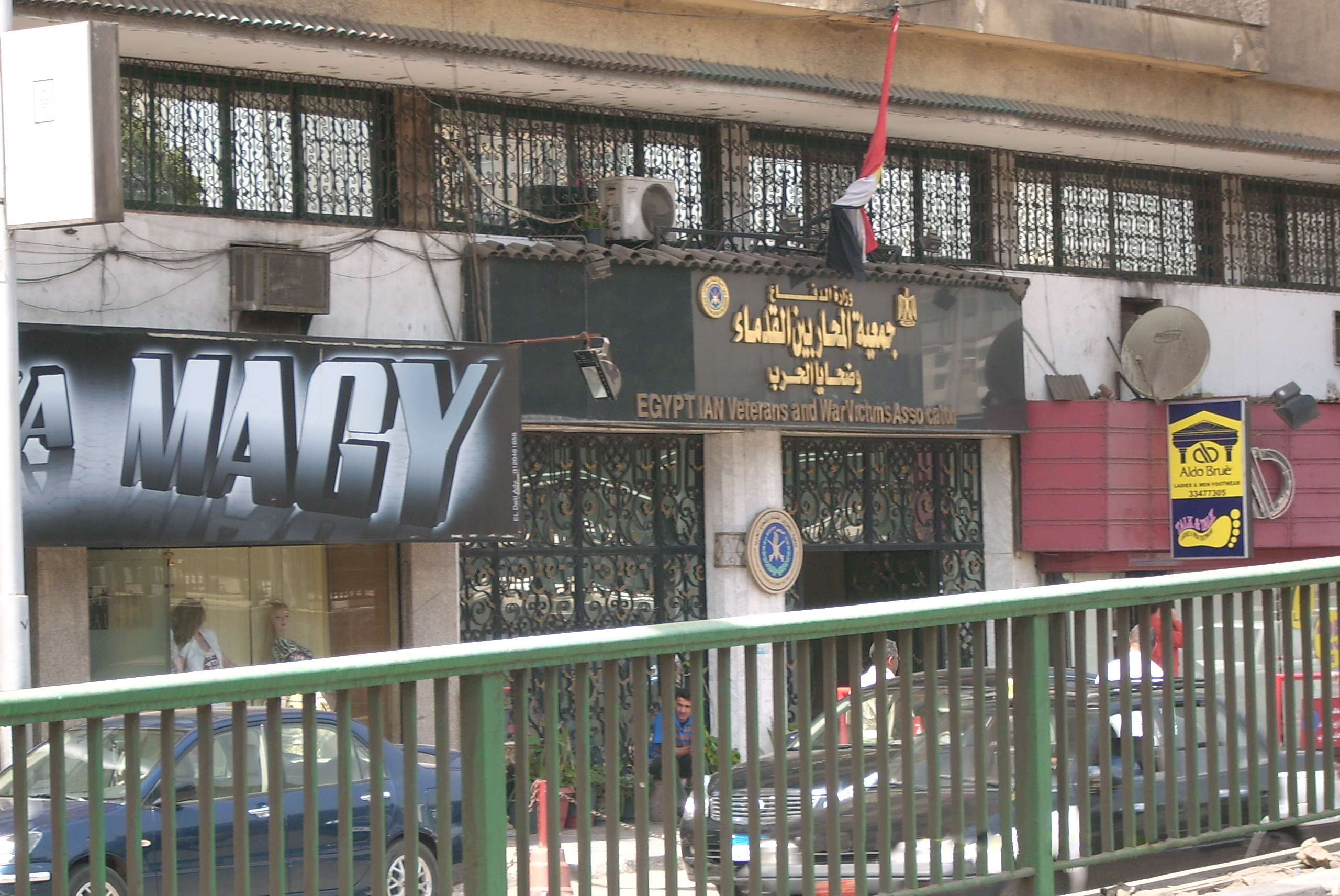
The Egyptian Veterans Association, Mohandesin, Cairo

- The Egyptian Society of Geriatric medicine was established in the 1982, First President was Prof Mohammed Sabbour, but is frozen now.
- The Egypt Al-Zheimer association is active in the field of Dementia and also in geriatric care, it was established in 1998 by Professor Abdel Moneim Ashour. It a member of the Alzheimer's Disease International Associations.
  - The Egyptian Alzheimer's Society has branches in Cairo, Alexandria, Assiut, Mansoura, Ismailia and Suez. It is moving forward in its work by entering into dialogue with carers to find out what they want. A number of initiatives have been set up in this way – including the production of a regular newsletter, carer support groups and a telephone help line – with varying degrees of success. The most welcomed initiative by family carers has been setting up respite care. The society also provides a number of services – including memory clinics, home-based assessments and family support, and bi-monthly family carer training and counselling programmes. In addition, the society continues with its awareness and education programme and has found that the consequence of enhanced awareness has been an increased drive to act and achieve on behalf of the society.
- Ministry of Social Solidarity offers many services for elderly & support to NGOs for elderly

== Conferences and workshops ==
Many geriatric medicine conferences have been held in Egypt.

- 1st Ain Shams Geriatrics & Gerontology conference, Cairo (2014).
- 2nd Ain Shams Geriatrics & Gerontology conference, Cairo (2015)
- 3rd Ain Shams Geriatrics & Gerontology conference, Cairo (2016)
- 1st Middle East and North Africa Regional Alzheimer's Disease International Conference, Cairo (2012).
- 2nd Middle East and North Africa Regional Alzheimer's Disease International Conference, Dubai (2013).
- 3rd Alexandria university Specialized Conference "Recent advances in Geriatric Medicine", Alexandria (2011)
- 1st NILES Conference for Geriatrics & Gerontology, National Institute of Longevity Elderly Sciences, Beni-Suef University (2/5/2017)
- 2nd NILES Conference for Geriatrics & Gerontology, National Institute of Longevity Elderly Sciences, Beni-Suef University (18/4/2018)

== Private based geriatrics services ==
- Ain Shams University specialised hospital has a Geriatrics outpatient clinic.
- Geriatric Medical Center at Downtown, Cairo
- Palestine hospital (a private owned hospital) established a long-term care unit in 1994
- Also many private centers are present as Center for Geriatric Services
- American Hospital in Tanta Has a geriatrics department.
- Wadi El-Nile hospital has a geriatrics outpatient clinic.
- Italian Hospital in Cairo has a Geriatrics department.
- Abdel Kader Fahmy hospital has a geriatrics clinic.
- Hasabo Hospital at Nasr City has a Geriatrics outpatient clinic.
- Arab Contractors Medical Center has a Geriatrics consultation Service.
- El-Gouna Hospital at Hurgada has a Geriatric Rehabilitation service.

== Psychogeriatrics ==
Many psychogeriatrics governmental (Most of Psychiatry departments in Egyptian Universities have or are establishing its psychogeriatrics section) and also other non-governmental private services exist.

- Psychiatric unit at Ain Shams University has a geriatric psychiatry unit with a dementia and memory clinic (twice weekly since 1996).
- Several private Psychogeriatrics Units are available in Egypt
- Psychogeriatrics Clinic at Maadi Military Hospital.
- Gamal Mady Aboul Azayem Hospital has a Psychogeriatrics clinic.

== See also ==
- List of hospitals in Egypt
- Geriatrics
