= Ewald W. Busse =

American psychiatrist and academic administrator (1917–2004)

- Born: August 18, 1917; St. Louis, Missouri, U.S.
- Died: March 7, 2004 (aged 86); Durham, North Carolina, U.S.
- Education: Westminster College; Washington University in St. Louis
- Occupations: psychiatrist, author, academic

Ewald William Busse (August 18, 1917 – March 7, 2004) was an American psychiatrist, gerontologist, author and academic administrator best known for being the dean of the Duke University School of Medicine.

== Biography ==
The son of German immigrants, Busse was born and raised in Saint Louis, Missouri. He received a bachelor degree in 1938 from Westminster College and doctor of medicine in 1942 from the Washington University School of Medicine. He served in the army from 1943 to 1946 and became a major. Upon his discharge from the army, he was trained in psychiatry at University of Colorado Medical Center from 1946 to 1948.

In 1953, he moved to Duke University, where he became the chair of the Department of Psychiatry, before eventually becoming associate provost and dean of medical education in 1974. He served in that position until 1982. From 1971 to 1972, Busse served as the president of the American Psychiatric Association. From 1987 to 1994, Busse served as president and chief executive officer of the North Carolina Institute of Medicine. He received many awards, including the Malford W. Thewlis award for gerontology and the William C. Menninger Award.

Much of his work was focused on biological aging as a driver of diseases of aging; he was president of the International Association of Gerontology and founding director of the Duke University Center for the Study of Aging and Human Development, and each year Duke awards the Busse Research Awards in his honor, which recognize significant contributions to aging research in both social/behavioral and biomedical sciences. The awards supported from an endowment made by Gerontology International.

He died March 7, 2004, in Durham, North Carolina. He was survived by his wife, Ortrude, and three daughters, a son having died earlier.

== Works ==
Busse, Ewald W., et al. "Studies of the Processes of Aging: Factors that Influence the Psyche of Elderly Persons," American Journal of Psychiatry 110(12) (June 1954): pages 897-903.

Busse, Ewald W., et al. "Studies of the Processes of Aging. X: The Strengths and Weaknesses of Psychic Functioning in the Aged," American Journal of Psychiatry 111(12) (June 1955): pages 896-901.

Busse, Ewald W. "Geriatrics Today – An Overview," American Journal of Psychiatry 123(10) (April 1967): pages 1226-1233.

Busse, Ewald W. Therapeutic Implications of Basic Research with the Aged: The Fourth Annual Institute of Pennsylvania Hospital Award Lecture in Memory of Edward A. Strecker, M.D. [Nutley, New Jersey: Roche Laboratories, 1967].

Busse, Ewald W. "APA's Role in Influencing the Evolution of a Health Care Delivery System," American Journal of Psychiatry 126(5) (November 1969): pages 739-744.

Busse, Ewald W., and Eric Pfeiffer, eds. Behavior and Adaptation in Late Life, by 17 Authors. Boston: Little, Brown, 1969.

Busse, Ewald W. "The Council on Mental Health Services," American Journal of Psychiatry 126(10) (April 1970): pages 1531-1533.

Busse, Ewald W. "Geriatrics: Some Complex Problems," American Journal of Psychiatry 127(8) (February 1971): pages 1078-1080.

Busse, Ewald W. "The Presidential Address: There are Decisions to Be Made," American Journal of Psychiatry 129(1) (July 1972): pages 1-9.

Barton, Walter E. "Ewald William Busse, M.D. One Hundredth President, 1921-1972," American Journal of Psychiatry 129(1) (July 1972): pages 12-16.

Busse, Ewald W., and Eric Pfeiffer, eds. Mental Illness in Later Life. Washington, DC: American Psychiatric Association, 1973.

Busse, Ewald W. The Present and Future Importance of Patterns of Private Psychiatric Practice in the Delivery of Mental Health Services: Report of the Task Force. Washington, DC: American Psychiatric Association, 1973.

Busse, Ewald W. Theory and Therapeutics of Aging. New York: Medcom Press, 1973.

Rosenfeld, Anne H., and Ewald W. Busse, eds. Psychiatric Education: Prologue to the 1980s: Report of the Conference on Education of Psychiatrists, Lake of the Ozarks, Missouri, June 9-15, 1975. Washington, DC: American Psychiatric Association, 1975.

Busse, Ewald W., ed. Cerebral Manifestations of Episodic Cardiac Dysrhythmias: Proceeding of a Symposium, June 19-20, 1978, Miami, Florida. Amsterdam: Excerpta Medica; New York: Distributed in the U.S. by Elsevier North-Holland, 1979.

Blazer, Dan G., II, and Ewald W. Busse, eds. Handbook of Geriatric Psychiatry. New York: Van Nostrand Reinhold, 1980.

Busse, Ewald W., George L. Maddox, and Edward C. Buckley, eds. The Duke Longitudinal Studies of Normal Aging, 1955-1980: Overview of History, Design, and Findings. New York: Springer, 1985.

Maddox, George L., and Ewald W. Busse. Aging, the Universal Human Experience: Selected Papers from the Symposia of the XIIIth Congress of the International Association of Gerontology. New York: Springer, 1987.

Busse, Ewald W., and Dan G. Blazer, II, eds. Geriatric Psychiatry. Washington, DC: American Psychiatric Press, 1989.

Busse, Ewald W., and Dan G. Blazer, II, eds. The American Psychiatric Press Textbook of Geriatric Psychiatry. Washington, DC: American Psychiatric Press, 1996.

Blazer, Dan G., II, David C. Steffens, and Ewald W. Busse, eds. Essentials of Geriatric Psychiatry. Washington, DC: American Psychiatric Pub., 2007.
