= Grumpy Old Bookman =

Grumpy Old Bookman is a literary blog started by Michael Allen in late March 2004. A number of the essays and reviews posted there were brought together in his 2005 book Grumpy Old Bookman.

== Background ==
The Grumpy Old Bookman is aimed at both readers and writers, and the content deals almost entirely with books and publishing, including such issues as advances for writers and the quality of publishers' review processes. It soon acquired a reputation for plain speaking and controversy. A typical entry will either be a lengthy review of a book, or the author's thoughts on some aspect of the book world, inspired by an item of recent news.

== Reception ==
In February 2005 the GOB blog was listed by The Guardian as one of the top ten literary blogs.

In November 2007 Allen announced on his blog that he was taking a "sabbatical".

He resumed blogging in May 2012.

In 2021, Allen announced that he had been diagnosed with Alzheimer's disease.

== See also ==
- Grumpy Old Men (disambiguation)
