= Grumpy Old Men =

Grumpy Old Men or grumpy old man may refer to:

== People ==
- "Grumpy old men", referring to geriatric psychology or the pseudoscientific irritable male syndrome § Relation to humans

== Art, entertainment, and media ==
- "Grumpy Old Man", a 2011 episode of Family Guy
- Grumpy Old Men (film), a 1993 comedy film starring Jack Lemmon and Walter Matthau
- Grumpy Old Men (musical), a 2018 stage musical based on the film
- Grumpy Old Men (TV series), a 2000s BBC Two television programme
- Grumpy Old Men, an Australian TV sports programme hosted by Kevin Bartlett
- Grumpy Old Man, a character portrayed by Dana Carvey on the television show Saturday Night Live: See Recurring Saturday Night Live characters and sketches introduced 1988–89 § Grumpy Old Man
