= Sheila West =

American ophthalmologist and academic

- Born: Sheila Kay West; September 15, 1946 (age 80); Salt Lake City, Utah, U.S.
- Education: University of California, San Francisco; Johns Hopkins University; University of California, Santa Barbara; California State University, East Bay
- Scientific career
- Workplaces: Johns Hopkins Bloomberg School of Public Health; Wilmer Eye Institute
- Thesis: Risk factors for congenital heart defects (1980)
- Notable students: Bonnielin Swenor
- Website: www.hopkinsmedicine.org/wilmer/about/employees/sheila-west.html

Sheila Kay West (born September 15, 1946) is an American ophthalmologist who is the El-Maghraby Professor of Preventive Ophthalmology at the Wilmer Eye Institute. She is also the vice-chair for research.

== Early life and education ==
West was born in Salt Lake City. She was an undergraduate at the University of California, Santa Barbara, then moved to the California State University, East Bay for graduate studies, before joining the UCSF Medical Center. She earned her Doctor of Pharmacy degree at the University of California, San Francisco, and her PhD in epidemiology from Johns Hopkins University, where she studied congenital heart defects.

== Research and career ==
After her PhD she was appointed program director of pharmaceutical studies. After four years teaching medicine in the University of the Philippines, West returned to the United States. West joined the Johns Hopkins Bloomberg School of Public Health – Wilmer Eye Institute Dana Center for Preventive Ophthalmology in 1984. She developed a surveillance system to monitor disparities in eye health, vision loss and access to ophthalmology. She became interested in cataract, the leading cause of vision impairment. She was the first to report the relationship between nuclear cataracts and smoking. Her research informed the Surgeon General of the United States's report on smoking and eye disease. In 2001, she was the first woman to be made President of the Association for Research in Vision and Ophthalmology.

West launched the Salisbury Eye Study, a longitudinal study of people on the Delmarva Peninsula. The population were racially diverse, and West identified differences in age-related macular generation between Americans of different ethnicities. This study prompted her interest in health disparities. She identified that the leading cause of blindness among Mexican Americans was glaucoma.

Alongside her work on cataracts, West was interested in the most common source of infectious eye disease, trachoma. She demonstrated that face washing is a simple and effective strategy to get rid of trachoma. Her efforts on trachoma started in Tanzania. She evaluated the success of trichiasis surgical techniques and contributed to the World Health Organization's SAFE strategy. West has served as a mentor for several high-profile scientists.

=== Awards and honors ===
- 2016 Association for Research and Vision in Ophthalmology Joanne G. Angle Award
- 2017 International Blindness Prevention Award
- 2018 Al Sumait Prize for Health
- 2019 Fight for Sight Mildred Weisenfeld Award for Excellence in Ophthalmology
- 2020 Vision Excellence Award
- 2023 University of California, San Francisco Distinguished Alum of the Year

=== Selected publications ===
- Susan M Friedman; Munoz, Beatriz; West, Sheila Kay; Rubin, Gary; Linda P Fried (2002). "Falls and fear of falling: which comes first? A longitudinal prediction model suggests strategies for primary and secondary prevention". Journal of the American Geriatrics Society. 50 (8): 1329–1335. doi:10.1046/j.1532-5415.2002.50352.x. PMID 12164987. Wikidata Q51041479.
- O D Schein; B Muñoz; Tielsch, James M.; K Bandeen-Roche; S West (1997). "Prevalence of dry eye among the elderly". American Journal of Ophthalmology. 124 (6): 723–728. doi:10.1016/s0002-9394(14)71688-5. PMID 9402817. Wikidata Q39457390.
- Susan M Friedman; Munoz, Beatriz; West, Sheila Kay; Rubin, Gary; Linda P Fried (2002). "Falls and fear of falling: which comes first? A longitudinal prediction model suggests strategies for primary and secondary prevention". Journal of the American Geriatrics Society. 50 (8): 1329–1335. doi:10.1046/j.1532-5415.2002.50352.x. PMID 12164987. Wikidata Q51041479.
