= Andrew Budson =

American neurologist

Andrew E. Budson
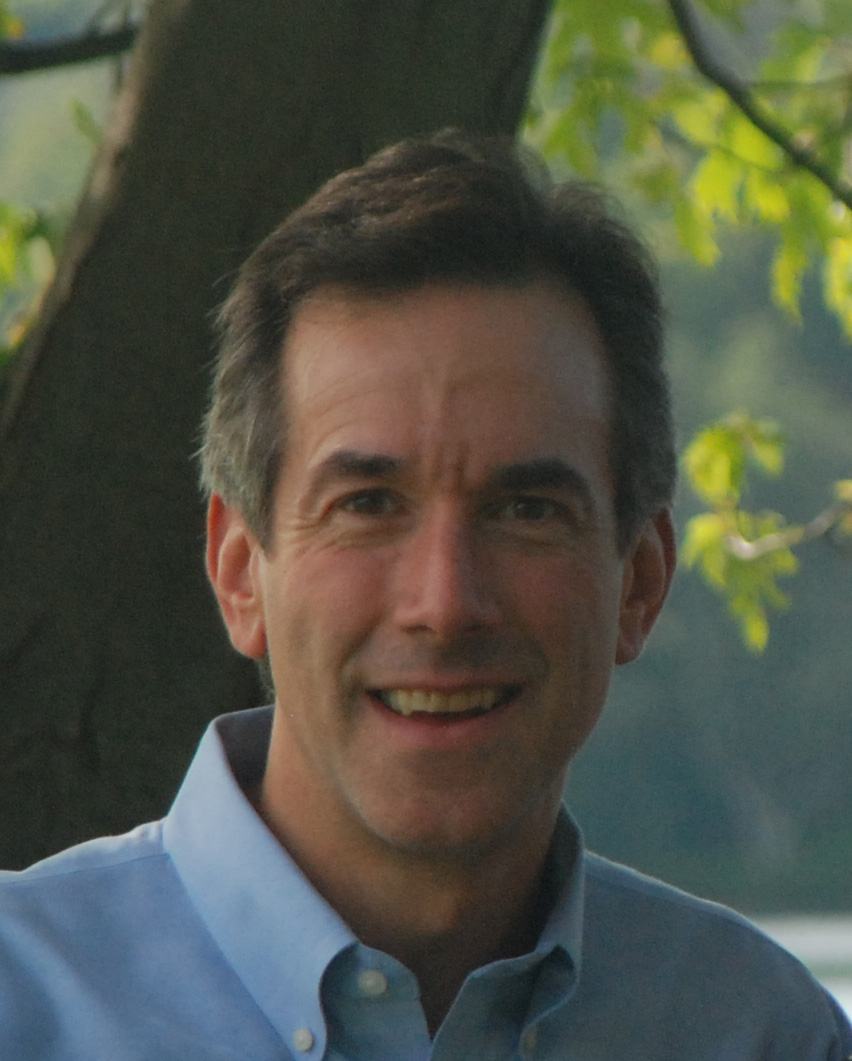
- Occupations: Neurologist, academic and researcher
- Awards: Elected member, Memory Disorders Research Society; Member, American Neurological Association; Norman Geschwind Prize in Behavioral Neurology; Research Award in Geriatric Neurology; Member, The Academy, Harvard Medical School

Academic background
- Education: B.A., Chemistry & Philosophy; M.D.
- Alma mater: Haverford College, Haverford Pennsylvania; Harvard Medical School, Boston, Massachusetts

Andrew E. Budson is an American neurologist, academic and researcher. He is a Professor of Neurology at Boston University School of Medicine, Lecturer in Neurology at Harvard Medical School, Chief of Cognitive and Behavioral Neurology and Associate Chief of Staff for Education at the Veterans Affairs (VA) Boston Healthcare System, where he also serves as a Director of the Center for Translational Cognitive Neuroscience. He is Associate Director and Outreach, Recruitment, and Engagement Core Leader at the Boston University Alzheimer's Disease Research Center.

As a cognitive behavioral neurologist, Budson has published over 150 papers and book chapters on clinical and cognitive neuroscience aspects of Alzheimer's disease (AD), Chronic Traumatic Encephalopathy (CTE), others dementias, and normal aging. He has co-authored or edited eight books, including Memory Loss, Alzheimer's Disease, and Dementia: A Practical Guide for Clinicians and Seven Steps to Managing Your Memory.

Budson is a member of the American Academy of Neurology, Memory Disorders Research Society, and the American Neurological Association. He is on the Board of Directors, and the Medical and Scientific Advisory Committee of Alzheimer's Association of Massachusetts and New Hampshire.

== Education ==
Budson received his Bachelor's degree with majors in Chemistry and Philosophy from Haverford College in 1988. He enrolled at Harvard Medical School, and earned his M.D. in 1993. He completed his internship in Internal Medicine at Brigham and Women's Hospital, Boston, followed by his residency in Neurology at the Harvard Longwood Program, also serving as chief resident. Later, he completed a clinical fellowship in cognitive and behavioral neurology and dementia under Kirk Daffner at Brigham and Women's Hospital in 1999, and a research fellowship in experimental psychology and cognitive neuroscience under Daniel Schacter at Harvard University, Cambridge in 2000.

== Career ==
Budson started his academic career as an Instructor in Neurology at Harvard Medical School in 1998, and was promoted to Assistant Professor of Neurology in 2001, and to Lecturer in Neurology in 2005. He held his next appointment at Boston University School of Medicine as an Associate Professor of Neurology from 2005 until 2009, and subsequently became Professor of Neurology, as well as Faculty Member in the Division of Graduate Medical Sciences there. In 2014, he held another appointment at Harvard Medical School as a Member of the Academy, and later on, in 2017, as a Chair of Science of Learning Interest Group in The Academy.

Along with academic appointments, at VA Boston Healthcare System, Budson served as Deputy Chief of Staff from 2010 to 2012, and has been serving as Chief of Cognitive and Behavioral Neurology Section, and Program Director for VA Boston/Boston Medical Center UCNS-Certified Cognitive Behavioral Neurology Fellowship since 2011, and as Associate Chief of Staff for Education since 2012. He also serves as Associate Director and Leader of Outreach, Recruitment, & Engagement Core at Boston University Alzheimer's Disease Research Center, and as Consultant Neurologist at Brigham and Women's Hospital.

== Research ==
Budson's research primarily focuses on understanding memory and memory distortions in patients with Alzheimer's disease and other neurological disorders, while using the techniques of experimental psychology and cognitive neuroscience. For his research in the field, he was awarded the Norman Geschwind Prize in Behavioral Neurology in 2008 and the Research Award in Geriatric Neurology in 2009, both from the American Academy of Neurology. He has received federal funding since 1998 including F32, K23, R01, and VA Merit grants, all related to aging and AD.

=== Alzheimer's disease and dementia ===
Budson has focused his research on understanding false memory in patients with Alzheimer's disease (AD) dementia, with particular attention on investigating the underlying mechanisms that cause an increased incidence of false memory in these patients, and determining if there are methods to help reduce the amount of false memory that occurs in these patients.

Budson discussed structural network differences in individuals with mild cognitive impairment (MCI) with high versus low executive abilities, and found that patients with AD have an increased reliance on gist-based memory, which leads to their increased incidence of false memory relative to healthy older controls. In this work, he discovered that patients with AD have impairments in item-specific recollection mechanisms. This prevents them from using their recall of "true" memories to combat information they never encountered (false memories).

He introduced and evaluated strategies that patients with AD can use to reduce false memories. He highlighted that healthy older adults are able to use two strategies to reduce their false memory, the "distinctiveness heuristic" and the "recall-to-reject" strategy. His research indicated that patients with AD are aware of these strategies, but can only use them to a limited capacity due to their general episodic memory impairment. In another study, he described the underlying neural correlates associated with the recollection and familiarity in both healthy populations and patients with AD and other dementias using electroencephalography (EEG) event-related potentials (ERPs) as well as structural and functional MRI. He demonstrated that false memory is generally associated with diminished N400 and Late Frontal Effects, and ERPs associated with the memorial mechanisms of familiarity and recollection are enhanced when perceptually rich stimuli are used, such as pictures.

=== Chronic Traumatic Encephalopathy (CTE) ===
Budson, along with co-workers, worked extensively to understand better chronic traumatic encephalopathy (CTE), a cause of dementia that has been discovered to be more prevalent than previously thought. He discovered new findings related to CTE including the diversity of its clinical presentation, the spectrum of its neuropathology, possible mechanisms related to blast injury, and its relation to motor neuron disease.

=== Consciousness ===
In 2022, Budson, with his colleagues Kenneth Richman and Elizabeth Kensinger, published a new theory of consciousness in the journal Cognitive and Behavioral Neurology. In their paper they suggested that consciousness developed as part of episodic memory and the other explicit memory systems to facilitate the flexible recombination of information needed by the episodic memory system to plan for the future. Building on Daniel Kahneman's and Amos Tversky's research into System 1 unconscious processing and System 2 conscious processing, Budson and colleagues argued that humans do not directly consciously perceive, decide, and act, but rather they perform these activities unconsciously and subsequently consciously remember the perception, decision, and action. Budson and colleagues suggested that this consciousness-as-memory theory can explain postdictive effects as well as why conscious decisions and actions (such as dieting and mindfulness) are difficult. As what they suggest are logical consequences of their theory, they made several other claims including (1) that all areas of the cerebral cortex contribute to consciousness but none is critical, (2) consciousness can arise from any "region" of the cerebral cortex (size of region not defined), (3) all mammals and other vertebrates experience some form of consciousness, (4) there are many disorders of consciousness including strokes, delirium, dementia, migraines, epilepsy, dissociative disorders, schizophrenia, and autism.

Although the article built on the work of others, such as Endel Tulving and, more recently, Joseph LeDoux and Hakwan Lau, the paper by Budson, Richman, and Kensinger was recognized as original, being covered by news outlets and the February 2023 print magazine edition of the French magazine, Science & Vie. It also generated published commentaries in Cognitive and Behavioral Neurology by Hinze Hogendoorn, Amnon Dafni-Merom and Shahar Arzy, and Howard Kirshner.

== Awards and honors ==
- 1996 – Chief Resident, Harvard-Longwood Neurology Program
- 1997 – Stanley Cobb Assembly Book Award, Boston Society for Neurology and Psychiatry
- 2000 – Board of Honor Tutors, Psychology Department, Harvard University
- 2000 – Chosen to give first Annual Laird Cermak Memorial Lecture, Massachusetts Neuropsychological Society
- 2000 – Paul R. Solomon Lecture, North Adams Regional Hospital
- 2003 – Invited speaker, Experimental Psychology Society, England
- 2003 – Invited speaker, Institute of Cognitive Neuroscience, Queen Square, London
- 2006 – Invited speaker, Association for Psychological Science, USA
- 2006 – Elected member, Memory Disorders Research Society
- 2008 – Invited speaker, XXIX International Congress of Psychology, Berlin, Germany
- 2008 – Norman Geschwind Prize in Behavioral Neurology
- 2009 – Member, American Neurological Association
- 2009 – Research Award in Geriatric Neurology
- 2014 – Member, The Academy, Harvard Medical School

== Bibliography ==
=== Books ===
- Memory Loss: A Practical Guide for Clinicians (2011) ISBN 9781437737790
- The Handbook of Alzheimer's Disease and Other Dementias (2011) ISBN 9781405168281
- Memory Loss, Alzheimer's Disease, and Dementia: A Practical Guide for Clinicians, 2nd Edition (2015) ISBN 9780323316101
- Seven Steps to Managing Your Memory: What's Normal, What's Not, and What to Do About It (2017) ISBN 9780190494971
- Chronic Traumatic Encephalopathy (2017) ISBN 9780323544252
- Six Steps to Managing Alzheimer's Disease and Dementia: A Guide for Families (2021) ISBN 9780190098124
- Memory Loss, Alzheimer's Disease, and Dementia: A Practical Guide for Clinicians, 3rd Edition (2021) ISBN 9780323795449
- Why We Forget and How to Remember Better: The Science Behind Memory (2023) ISBN 9780197607732

=== Selected articles ===
- McKee, A. C., Gavett, B. E., Stern, R. A., Nowinski, C. J., Cantu, R. C., Kowall, N. W., ... & Budson, A. E. (2010). TDP-43 proteinopathy and motor neuron disease in chronic traumatic encephalopathy. Journal of Neuropathology & Experimental Neurology, 69(9), 918–929.
- Quiroz, Y. T., Ally, B. A., Celone, K., McKeever, J., Ruiz-Rizzo, A. L., Lopera, F., Stern, C. E., & Budson, A. E. (2011). Event-related potential markers of brain changes in preclinical familial Alzheimer disease. Neurology, 77(5), 469–475.
- Turk, K. W., Elshaar, A. A., Deason, R. G., Heyworth, N. C., Nagle, C., Frustace, B., Flannery, S., Zumwalt, A., & Budson, A. E. (2018). Late Positive Component Event-related Potential Amplitude Predicts Long-term Classroom-based Learning. Journal of cognitive neuroscience, 30(9), 1323–1329.
- Turk, K. W., Palumbo, R., Deason, R. G., Marin, A., Elshaar, A., Gosselin, E., O'Connor, M. K., Tripodis, Y., & Budson, A. E. (2020). False Memories: The Other Side of Forgetting. Journal of the International Neuropsychological Society, 26(6), 545–556.
- Malone, C., Turk, K. W., Palumbo, R., & Budson, A. E. (2021). The Effectiveness of Item-Specific Encoding and Conservative Responding to Reduce False Memories in Patients with Mild Cognitive Impairment and Mild Alzheimer's Disease Dementia. Journal of the International Neuropsychological Society, 27(3), 227–238.
- Turk, K. W., Marin, A., Schiloski, K. A., Vives-Rodriguez, A. L., Uppal, P., Suh, C., Dwyer, B., Palumbo, R., & Budson, A. E. (2021). Head Injury Exposure in Veterans Presenting to Memory Disorders Clinic: An Observational Study of Clinical Characteristics and Relationship of Event-Related Potentials and Imaging Markers. Frontiers in neurology, 12, 626767.
