= Irritable male syndrome =

Behavioral pattern in seasonally mating mammals

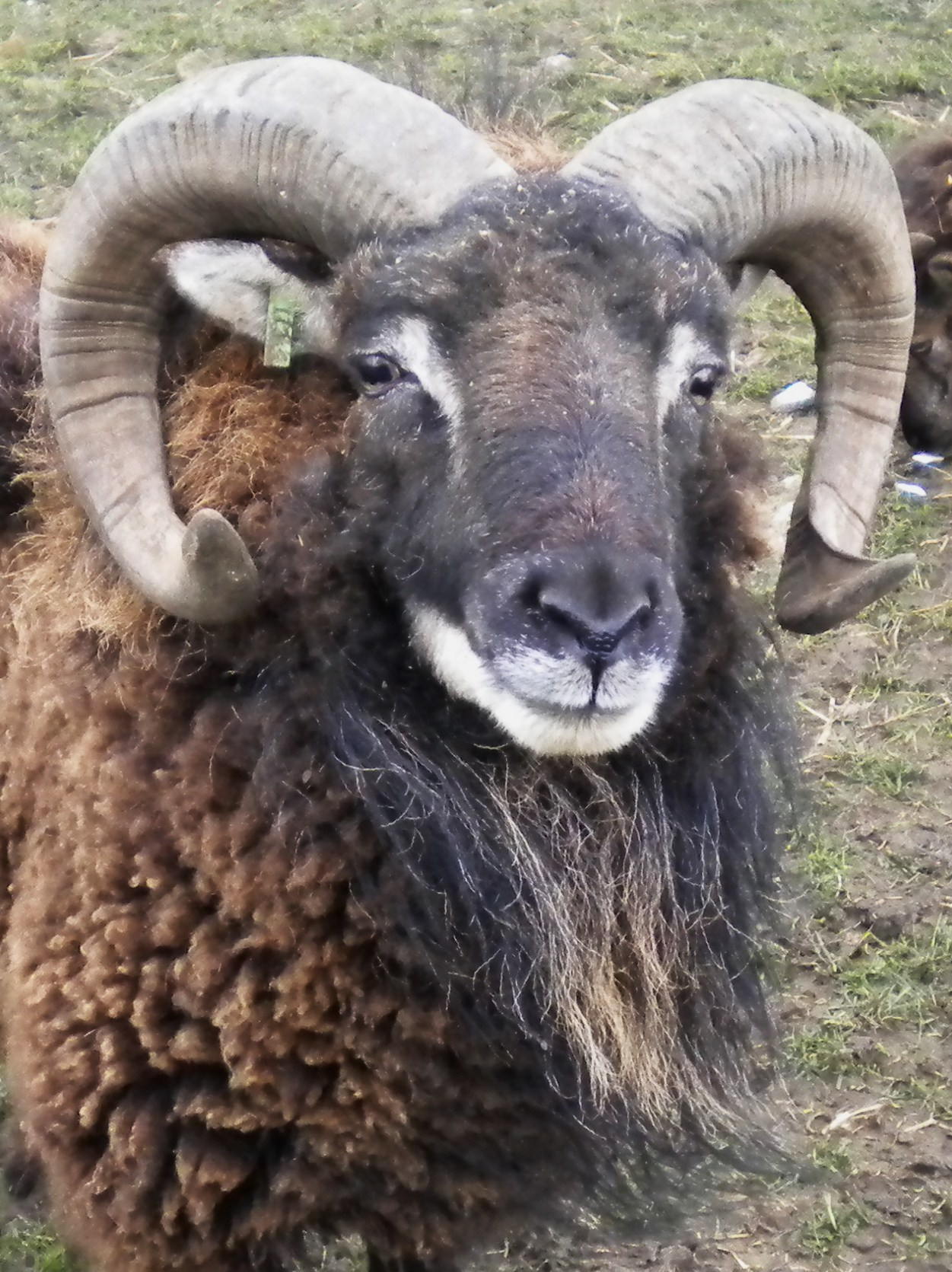
Irritable male syndrome has been documented in Soay rams.

Irritable male syndrome (IMS) is an annual behavior pattern that has been described in Soay sheep and other mammals with a strictly seasonal breeding pattern and described in a 2002 literature review of animal behavior by Gerald A. Lincoln. IMS is a striking feature in mammals with seasonal breeding patterns; it manifests at the end of the mating season. The term has been adapted to refer to disagreeability observed in aged human males.

== Characteristics ==
Soay sheep mate for five weeks during November and December each year, and give birth five months later in the spring. The rams' testosterone levels soar during the late autumn mating season. In the winter, testosterone levels fall and they stop mating. As their testosterone levels fall, the rams become more nervous and withdrawn, striking out irrationally.

The term covers symptoms thought to be caused by a drop in testosterone levels in male mammals. Similar behaviors have been observed in red deer, reindeer, and Indian elephants.

Lincoln concluded his 2002 review, writing: "This brief review challenges the dogma that male mammals are constantly reproductively active following sexual maturity at puberty. Males of many, and perhaps the majority of, long-lived species, express periodic changes in testicular activity and behaviour during their normal life cycle. In the most extreme examples, as illustrated by the Soay ram, males continually cycle between the sexually active/fertile state and the sexually inactive/infertile state, often on an annual or long-term basis. In individuals, testicular activity may vary with changes in social status, nutrition, health, age and other factors. This also applies to man."

== Relation to humans ==
The term was popularized by author Jed Diamond in 2004 as being related to "andropause", a concept he had earlier popularized. According to Diamond, andropause is a change of life in middle-aged men, which has hormonal, physical, psychological, interpersonal, social, sexual, and spiritual aspects. He says that this change occurs in all men and may occur as early as age 45 to 50 and more dramatically after the age of 70 in some men, and that women's and men's experiences are somewhat similar phenomena.

The language of "andropause" and its supposed parallels with menopause have not been accepted by the medical community. Thomas Perls and David J. Handelsman, in a 2015 editorial in the Journal of the American Geriatrics Society, say that between the ill-defined nature of the diagnosis and the pressure and advertising from drug companies selling testosterone and human growth hormone, as well as dietary supplement companies selling various "boosters" for aging men, the relevant medical condition, late-onset hypogonadism is overdiagnosed and overtreated. Perls and Handelsman note that in the US, "sales of testosterone increased from $324 million in 2002 to $2 billion in 2012, and the number of testosterone doses prescribed climbed from 100 million in 2007 to half a billion in 2012, not including the additional contributions from compounding pharmacies, Internet, and direct-to-patient clinic sales."
