= Elizabeth Kensinger =

American psychologist and neuroscientist

- Education: Harvard University; Massachusetts Institute of Technology
- Known for: Research on emotion and memory
- Scientific career
- Fields: Psychology; Neuroscience
- Workplaces: Boston College
- Academic advisors: Suzanne Corkin; Daniel Schacter

Elizabeth Kensinger is Professor of Psychology and Neuroscience at Boston College. She is known for her research on emotion and memory over the human lifespan. She is co-author of the book Why We Forget and How To Remember Better: The Science Behind Memory, published in 2023 by Oxford University Press, which provides an overview of the psychology and neuroscience of memory. She also is the author of the book Emotional Memory Across the Adult Lifespan, which describes the selectivity of memory, i.e., how events infused with personal significance and emotion are much more memorable than nonemotional events. This book provides an overview of research on the cognitive and neural mechanisms underlying the formation and retrieval of emotional memories. Kensinger is co-author of a third book How Does Emotion Affect Attention and Memory? Attentional Capture, Tunnel Memory, and the Implications for Posttraumatic Stress Disorder with Katherine Mickley Steinmetz, which highlights the roles of emotion in determining what people pay attention to and later remember.

Kensinger received the Searle Scholar Award in 2008, the Springer Early Career Achievement Award in Research on Adult Development and Aging from American Psychological Association, Division 20 in 2009, the F.J. McGuigan Early Career Investigator Research Prize on Understanding the Human Mind from the American Psychological Association in 2010, and the Janet Taylor Spence Award from the Association for Psychological Science in 2010.

== Biography ==
Kensinger grew up in Kansas City, Missouri. She graduated from Harvard University in 1998 with a Bachelor of Arts degree (summa cum laude) in Psychology, and Biology. She went to graduate school at the Massachusetts Institute of Technology and obtained her PhD in neuroscience in 2003, working under the supervision of Suzanne Corkin. Kensinger subsequently completed a postdoctoral fellowship at the Department of Radiology of Massachusetts General Hospital and at Harvard University, where she worked under the supervision of Daniel Schacter.

Kensinger joined the faculty of the Department of Psychology at Boston College in 2006 and was promoted to Professor in 2013. She directs the Cognitive and Affective Neuroscience Laboratory which uses behavioral testing and neuroimaging techniques to understand how age and emotional content influence how information is stored and remembered.

Kensinger has been involved in the Innocence Project, a national pro-bono network with ties to the Innocence Program Clinic at Boston College.[1] Research suggests that eyewitness testimony played a role in wrongful convictions in nearly three-quarters of DNA exonerations in the United States. In collaboration with the Innocence Program clinic, Kensinger has conducted seminars with law school students to educate them about wrongful convictions, false confessions, flawed forensics, and mistaken identification, and more generally about the fallibility of human memory.

== Research ==
Kensinger's laboratory investigates the cognitive and neural processes supporting memory for emotional and nonemotional information, with a focus on how emotion influences the vividness and accuracy of memory over the lifespan. One of Kensinger's studies, conducted in collaboration with Suzanne Corkin, explored the effect of negative emotional content on working memory. The researchers asked participants to perform an n-back working memory task with negative and neutral stimuli. They found that participants' accuracy in performing the n-back task was unaffected by the emotional content of the stimuli, which suggested that the memory enhancements observed for emotional stimuli in long-term memory do not extend to working memory.

Another line of research has investigated whether context is encoded when emotional information is presented. Across a number of studies, Kensinger and colleagues have demonstrated that emotional information tends to be remembered well, but the contextual information is remembered less well. This memory effect becomes exaggerated over delays that include sleep (e.g., Payne, Chambers, & Kensinger, 2012) and does not seem to be attributable merely to visual attention (e.g., Steinmetz & Kensinger, 2013).

Kensinger and her colleagues have studied the effects of normal aging and Alzheimer's disease on emotional memory. Alzheimer's disease is associated with the atrophy of limbic structures including the amygdala, which plays an important role in processing emotional (especially negative) stimuli. The authors reported that Alzheimer's patients showed a disproportionate impairment in remembering negative words and pictures when compared with healthy elderly controls. These findings implicate the amygdala in accounting for the memory boost associated with processing information with a negative emotional valence. Results also show that young and older adults but not Alzheimer's disease patients portray better memory for emotional versus neutral pictures and words. Older adults and Alzheimers patients show no benefit from emotional context, on the other hand, young adults remember more items buried in an emotional versus neutral context.

== Representative publications ==
- Kensinger, E. A., Brierley, B., Medford, N., Growdon, J. H., & Corkin, S. (2002). Effects of normal aging and Alzheimer's disease on emotional memory. Emotion, 2(2), 118–134.
- Kensinger, E. A., & Corkin, S. (2004). Two routes to emotional memory: Distinct neural processes for valence and arousal. Proceedings of the National Academy of Sciences of the United States of America, 101(9), 3310–3315.
- Kensinger, E. A. (2007). Negative emotion enhances memory accuracy: Behavioral and neuroimaging evidence. Current Directions in Psychological Science, 16(4), 213–218.
- Kensinger, E. A. (2009). Remembering the details: Effects of emotion. Emotion Review, 1(2), 99–113.
- Payne, J. D., Chambers, A. M., & Kensinger, E. A. (2012). Sleep promotes lasting changes in selective memory for emotional scenes. Frontiers in Integrative Neuroscience, 6, 108.
- Steinmetz, K. R. M., & Kensinger, E. A. (2013). The emotion-induced memory trade-off: More than an effect of overt attention? Memory & Cognition, 41(1), 69–81.
- Budson, Andrew; Kensinger, Elizabeth (2023). Why We Forget and How to Remember Better: The Science Behind Memory. New York: Oxford University Press. ISBN 978-0-197-60773-2.

== Personal life ==
Kensinger is married and has a daughter. Her hobbies include playing violin, baking and hiking.
