= Malford W. Thewlis =

American physician

- Born: October 11, 1863; Wakefield, Rhode Island
- Died: June 3, 1956 (aged 66); Rhode Island, United States
- Education: Bowdoin Medical School of Maine
- Occupation: physician

Malford Wilcox Thewlis (December 4, 1889 – June 3, 1956) was an American physician and pioneer of gerontology, who co-founded the American Geriatrics Society in 1942. He is commemorated by the annual Thewlis Lecture on Gerontology and Geriatrics, established at the University of Rhode Island. As a neuropsychiatrist, he attended US President Woodrow Wilson, following a stroke in 1919.

Thewlis was born on December 4, 1889, in Wakefield, Rhode Island, the son of James E. Thewlis and Viola (née Wilcox), and received his MD from the Bowdoin Medical School of Maine in 1911. He married Miss Christiane Cherfils (1895 – 1978) of Paris, France on December 10, 1919, and they had a son, Harold, who became a professor of politics at University of Rhode Island. Thewlis was one of the few physicians to take note of Ignatz Leo Nascher's 1914 book, Geriatrics: The Diseases of Old Age and Their Treatment, and devoted his life's work to care of the elderly and research into the diseases of old age. He authored "The Care of the Aged: Geriatrics", first published in 1919. Thewlis was also an accomplished amateur magician, and a member of the International Brotherhood of Magicians: he recommended the practice of conjuring tricks to keep the mind and hands supple. He died on June 3, 1956, and was cremated.

== Publications ==
- Malford W. Thewlis (1919) Geriatrics-- a treatise on senile conditions, diseases of advanced life, and care of the aged C. V. Mosby (St Louis)
- Malford W. Thewlis (1939) Preclinical medicine; preclinical states and prevention of disease Williams & Wilkins
- Malford W. Thewlis (1941) The Care of the Aged C. V. Mosby (St Louis)
- Malford W. Thewlis & Isabella Clark Swezy (1954) Handwriting and the Emotions American Graphological Society
