= Geriatric rheumatology =

Geriatric rheumatology is the branch of medicine that studies rheumatologic disorders in elderly (joints, muscles & other structures around the joints). Sometimes it is called Gerontorheumatology.

== Origin ==
The geriatric rheumatology clinic provides evaluation and management services to patients with various musculoskeletal and soft tissue disorders. Evaluation of the elderly patient is often complex due to the many comorbid conditions encountered in this population often compounded by cognitive disorders, functional decline, polypharmacy and limited social supports.

== Training & education programs ==
During training physicians observe and participate in the diagnosis and management of various rheumatologic conditions which contribute to elderly functional decline including connective tissue disorders, crystal diseases, osteoarthritis and other soft tissue disorders. They also learn to differentiate these various clinical conditions, gain an understanding of the various treatment options available, as well as learn how to work with a multidisciplinary team of health professionals.

Some Departments of Medicine offer a three-year combined Geriatric-Rheumatology Fellowship, which is composed of a year of clinical geriatrics and training in clinical epidemiology and health services research, a year of clinical rheumatology and an opportunity to explore scholarly geriatric-rheumatology research projects in the third year.

Many books and resources are available dedicated to geriatric rheumatology.

Many geriatricians and rheumatologists are dedicated to this new subspecialty. Some internal medicine departments have established a separate geriatric rheumatology clinics.

== Organisation & societies ==
International Society of Geriatric Rheumatology was established to help advancing research in the area of geriatric rheumatology and improve the quality of management of rheumatologic disorders in elderly.
