= Cardiogeriatrics =

Branch of cardiology addressing the care of elderly people with heart disease

Cardiogeriatrics, or geriatric cardiology, is the branch of cardiology and geriatric medicine that deals with the cardiovascular disorders in elderly people.

Cardiac disorders such as coronary heart disease, including myocardial infarction, heart failure, cardiomyopathy, and arrhythmias such as atrial fibrillation, are common and are a major cause of mortality in elderly people. Vascular disorders such as atherosclerosis and peripheral arterial disease cause significant morbidity and mortality in aged people. Guidelines of the Cardiogeriatrics Department of the Brazilian Cardiology Society were published in English.

The American Journal of Geriatric Cardiology is the official journal of the Society of Geriatric Cardiology.

== See also ==
- Cardiology
- Geriatrics
