= Geriatric nephrology =

Geriatric nephrology is the branch of internal medicine and geriatric medicine that deals with diseases of the kidney.

It is a growing subspecialty of geriatrics. Patients who are living longer may acquire diseases that accelerate chronic kidney disease, which often remains undetected until patients are confronted with the sudden need for dialysis.

International Society for Geriatric Urology and Nephrology is dedicated to this issue and has its own journal.

A book about geriatric nephrology was published in 1986 by Bernard Davis, M. Michelis.

The American Society of Nephrology has a grant in Geriatric Nephrology.

In the United States, the median age of patients starting dialysis is 64.8 years old, yet the fastest growing segment of the dialysis population is 75 years and older. Geriatric nephrology emphasizes early identification and aggressive intervention, as well as the incorporation of geriatric and palliative care principles that emphasize independence and functionality.
