= Arnold Lorand =

Austrian physician and longevity researcher

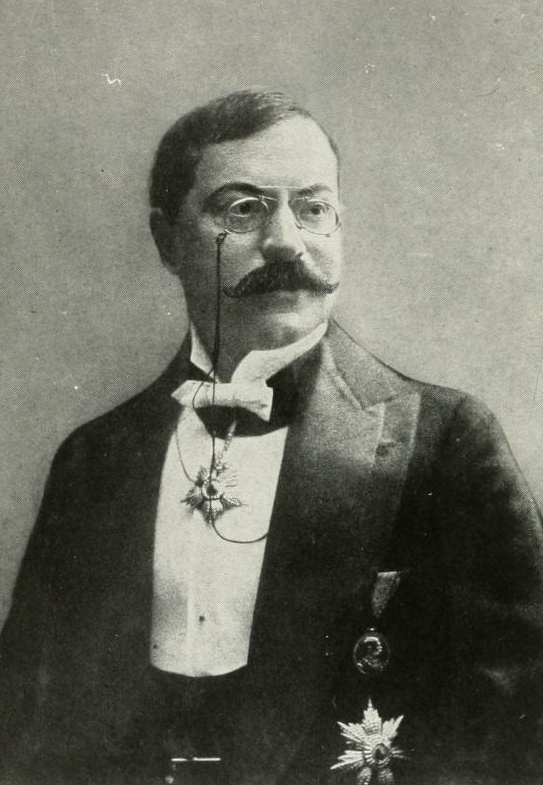
- Born: 1865
- Died: 1943 (aged 77–78); Paris
- Occupations: Physician, writer

Arnold Lorand (1865–1943) was an Austrian physician and longevity researcher.

== Biography ==
Lorand was a physician to the spa at Carlsbad, Austria-Hungary during the early 20th century. He was also a longevity researcher. He has been described as a pioneer of modern geriatric medicine.

Lorand believed that slowing down of the blood stream from bad dieting is a main cause of old age. He believed it was possible to prevent premature old age by consuming a diet largely of milk products, brown bread, fruit and vegetables. Lorand argued against a strict vegetarian diet, "true vegetarians frequently present a pale, unhealthy and prematurely aged appearance". Instead, he promoted an ovo-lacto vegetarian diet (a vegetarian diet with eggs and milk).

Lorand believed that the consumption of meat is only beneficial for youths during the period of growth. He argued that adults should abstain from consuming meat. He stated that "a milk-egg-vegetable diet is the best and at the same time the most rational for mankind." Lorand recommended people to drink water or their skin will suffer from premature wrinkling.

== Works ==
=== Old Age Deferred ===
In his book Old Age Deferred (first published in 1911), Lorand documented hygienic and therapeutic measures to postpone old age. He argued that old age resulted from the "degeneration of the ductless (endocrine) glands)". The book went through four printings within fifteen months of appearing in America.

Lorand denounced excessive use of alcohol and tobacco. In the book, Lorand presented "twelve commandments" to prolong life. These included healthy dieting and the regular use of bathing, exercise, open air and rest. He believed the commandments could prolong life until one hundred years or more.

=== Health and Longevity Through Rational Diet ===
Lorand's Health and Longevity Through Rational Diet (first published in 1912), is a work on dietetics and was positively reviewed by the medical community. American physician Victor C. Vaughan wrote a supportive introduction for the book. The Massachusetts Medical Journal concluded it is of "high calibre and worthy of high recommendation". The Pacific Medical Journal commented that "no work of modern times has given to the profession such a complete volume on rational diet". A review in the American Journal of Pharmacy was entirely positive, considering it free from fads and a serious work on dietetics. Likewise, The New England Medical Gazette commented that Lorand "presents no fad or hobby, but bases his many practical suggestions upon sound physiology." The Journal of the American Medical Association recommended the book for the layman and the practitioner.

== Selected publications ==
- Old Age Deferred (1911, 1913)
- Health and Longevity Through Rational Diet (1912, 1921)
- Building Human Intelligence (1917)
- Life Shortening Habits and Rejuvenation (1922)
- The Ultra-Violet Rays (1928)
