= Ignatz Leo Nascher =

Austrian-American doctor and gerontologist

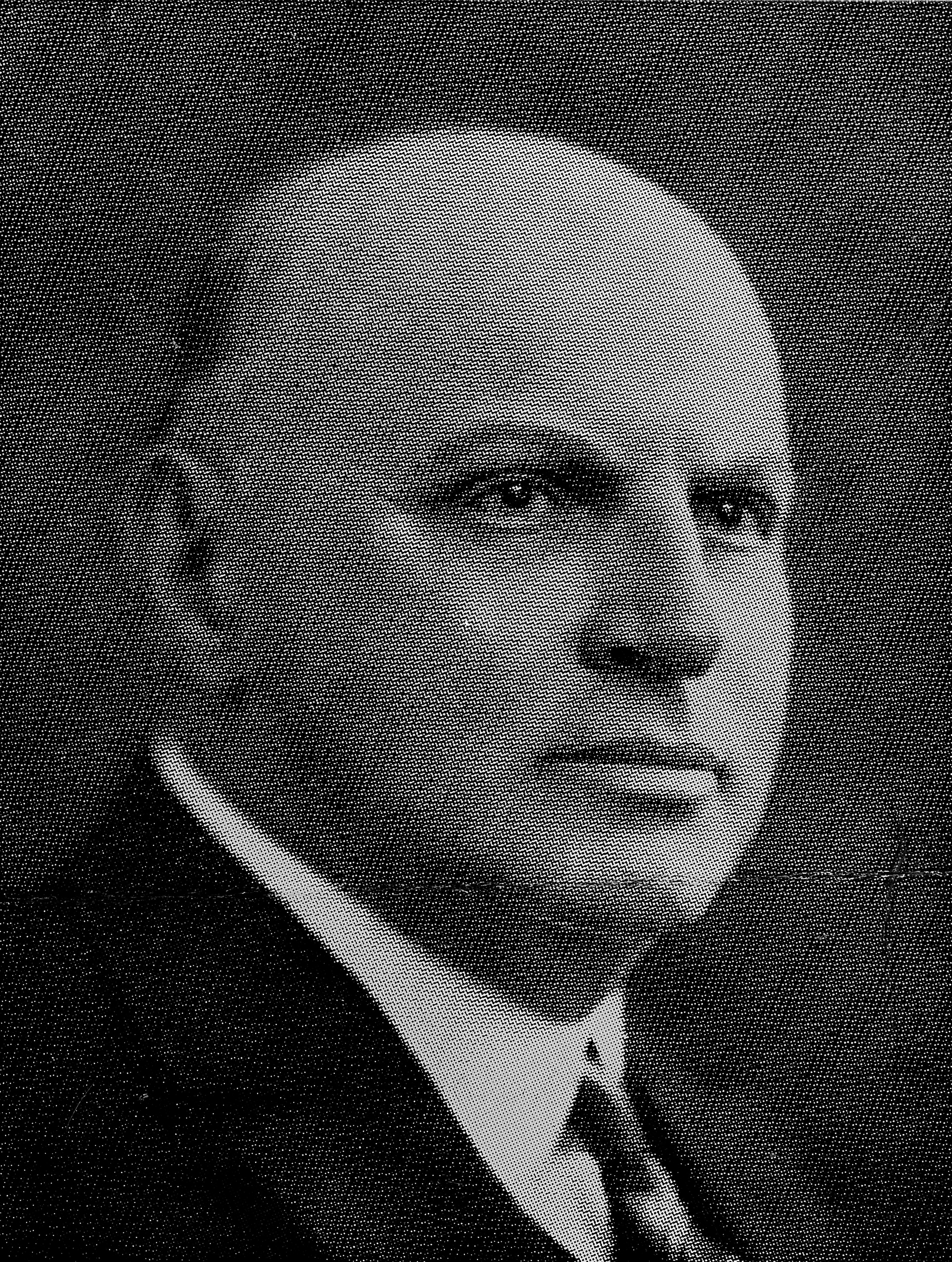
- Born: 11 October 1863; Vienna, Austria
- Died: 25 December 1944 (aged 81); New York City, United States
- Education: New York College of Pharmacy; New York University
- Occupation: Physician
- Employer: New York Department of Hospitals
- Known for: Study of geriatrics
- Notable work: Geriatrics: The Diseases of Old Age and Their Treatment
- Spouse: Augusta Lanzit (married 1886–1943)
- Children: 2

Ignatz Leo Nascher (11 October 1863 – 25 December 1944) was an Austrian-American medical doctor and gerontologist. He coined the term "geriatrics" in 1909.

Born in Vienna, Nascher immigrated to the United States at a young age. He graduated from Columbia University and received an M.D. from New York University. After more than two decades in private practice, Nascher began publishing his ideas on geriatrics. His theories, initially published in the New York Medical Journal, helped lay the groundwork for the modern study of ageing and elder care. In later life, Nascher worked for the city of New York as a medical administrator and attempted to put some of his ideas into effect.

As he aged, Nascher studied and described his and his wife's medical issues. In 1942, Nascher was elected in an honorary role as the first president of the American Geriatrics Society, and died in 1944. Gerontologist A.M. Clarfield wrote in 1990 that Nascher was "a pioneer and a prophet, a man clearly ahead of his time."

== Early life and education ==
Nascher was born in Vienna, Austria on 11 October 1863. Immigrating to the US with his family as an infant, he was raised in a New York City tenement without hot water.

Nascher first attended City College and subsequently transferred to the New York College of Pharmacy, which would become part of Columbia University. In 1882, at the age of 19, he graduated with a degree in pharmacy. Three years later, he received his M.D. from New York University. He began his career in private practice, first at Mount Sinai hospital and subsequently opening his own practice. Nascher and his wife, Augusta Lanzit, were married in 1886. They had two children—Eugene, born 1887, and Ansel, born in 1890. Nascher was a lifelong Democrat and attended every inauguration of a Democratic president between 1885 (Cleveland) and 1936 (Roosevelt's second).

Little is known of his time in private practice, although he did publish at least two journal articles, one focusing on embryology (1889) and the other on prostitution (1908). Nascher also wrote a book focused on urban poverty, The Wretches of Povertyville: A Sociological Study of the Bowery, published in 1909. Nascher's work contained the argument (described as a "typical example" of racist attitudes of the time by academic Mara Keire) that opium addiction was required for white prostitutes to find sex with Chinese-American johns endurable.

== Geriatrics ==
In 1909, Nascher published a groundbreaking article entitled "Geriatrics" in the New York Medical Journal (1909; 90: 358-9). He wrote, "Geriatrics, from geras, old age, and iatrikos, relating to the physician, is a term I would suggest as an addition to our vocabulary to cover the same field that is covered in old age that is covered by the term pediatrics in childhood, to emphasize the necessity of considering senility and its disease apart from maturity and to assign it a separate place in medicine."

His 1909 article broke with prevailing views on aging. Nascher wrote that "senility is a distinct period of life, a physiological entity as much so as the period of a childhood." This emphasis on physiological processes and mechanisms of aging and senescence challenged the "pathological model" of aging that was then "the primary focus of medical researchers, including Nobel Laureate Elie Metchnikoff." Nascher addressed and rejected Metchnikoff's theory that aging was caused by tissue phagocytosis and "autointoxication" (the absorption of intestinal decompositions), for which Metchnikoff prescribed yoghurt.

Nascher argued that the disease and medical care of the aged should be considered a separate specialty. His published research included the first U.S. textbook on geriatric medicine. Initially, Nascher encountered resistance from his American colleagues. Nascher may have been inspired by developments in geriatric care in Austria, which he witnessed during repeated visits, including Arnold Lorand's 1910 book Old Age Deferred.

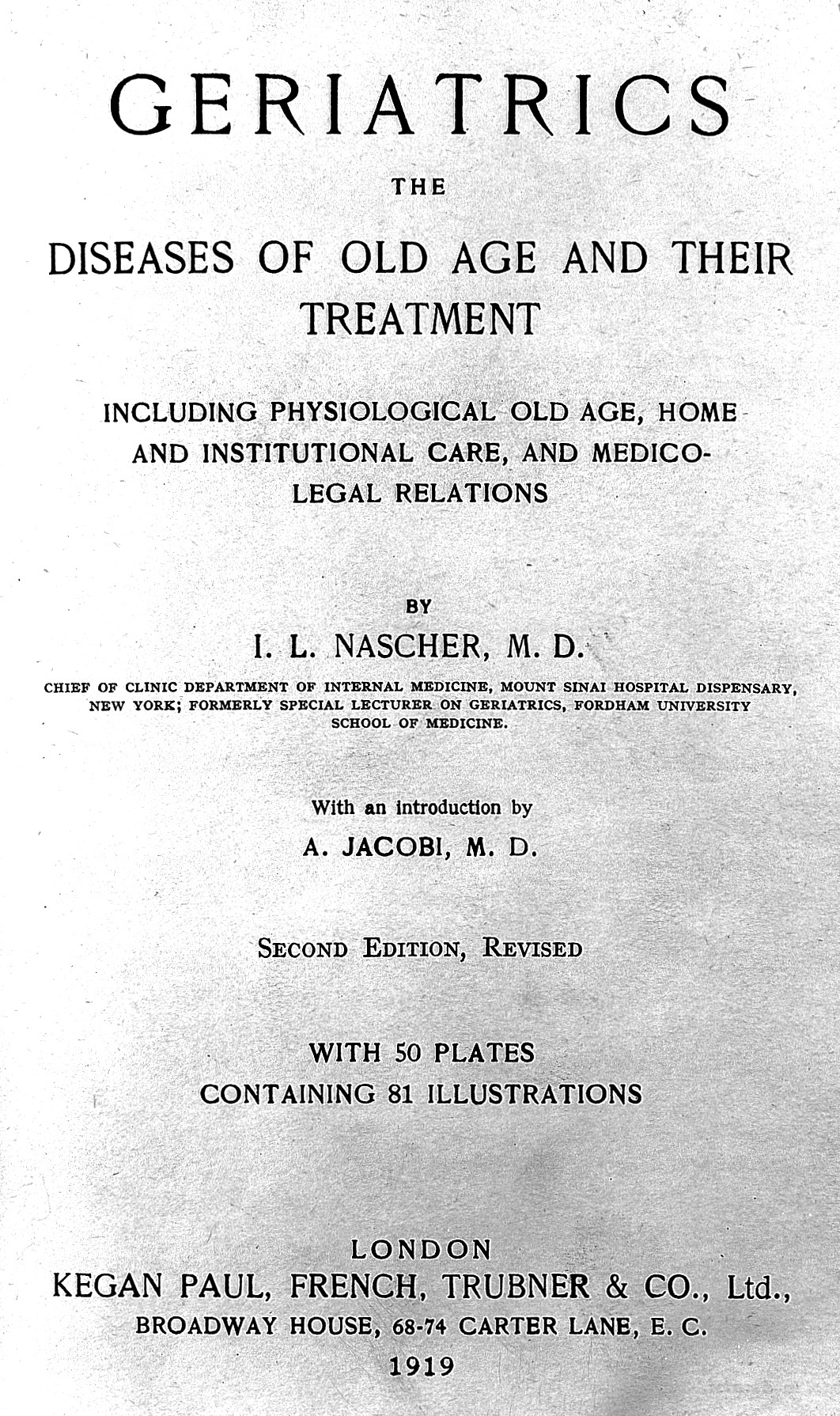
The title page of Nascher's textbook on geriatrics (2nd edition)

Nascher had difficulty finding a publisher for his 1914 book, Geriatrics: The Diseases of Old Age and Their Treatment (Philadelphia: P. Blakiston's Son & Co). It was the first American publication on geriatrics published since 1881 (Clinical Lectures on the Diseases of Old Age). The book, which begins with an introduction by Abraham Jacobi, has three major sections: physiologic old age, pathologic old age and a sociological analysis of elder care. Nascher argued that "senescence is not due to any one cause" and that "disease is not (always) a causative or even an essential factor", views which are now widespread among gerontologists. A retrospective review of the book, published for its 100th anniversary in 2014, described its "pleasing, rambling tone," and noted Nascher's prescient view of functional capacity. The reviewer compared the book (in relation to the field of gerontology) to a Ship of Theseus, which set in motion the whole area of study, but of which only "a few of the original timbers remain".

== Later life ==
Nascher founded the New York Geriatrics Society in 1915. Leaving private practice, he began working as Physician to the New York City Department of Public Welfare in 1916. The next year, he began writing a recurring column on geriatrics in the Medical Review of Reviews. In 1925, he was made Chief Physician of the Department of Hospitals, but was required in 1929 to retire due to age. However, in 1931 he successfully pushed to become leader of the City Farm Colony medical facility on Roosevelt Island, which later became Coler-Goldwater Specialty Hospital. Nascher wrote that he hoped "to change the antiquated methods dealing with aged public dependents," and credited himself with focusing on their revitalization and rehabilitation.

Nascher and his wife, Augusta, traveled extensively in Europe, Asia, and South America, and also took an annual trip to Poughkeepsie in upstate New York. Beginning in the late 1930s, as his wife's mental condition declined, Nascher cared for her with "devotion" and also kept notes, which he developed into his last published paper, "The Aging Mind." He continued their trips to Poughkeepsie, although she had little memory, because of the "momentary pleasure" they gave her.

Nascher himself was money-stressed and suffering from a foot ailment and angina; given his medical interests, Nascher was observant of his own aging, and wrote extensively on his health. He continued to travel vigorously, self-reliant, until very near to his death. He was named the American Geriatrics Society's honorary president at their first meeting in June 1942. The Nascher/Manning Award for Lifetime Achievement in Geriatrics, which is awarded by the Society, is named after him. Augusta died in 1943. In the last year of his life, he listened extensively to the radio, and celebrated the Democratic victory in the 1944 election, saying that he was in his "second childhood." Nascher died on Christmas (December 25) 1944.
