= Bonnielin Swenor =

American ophthalmologist

- Born: Bonnielin Sceurman
- Education: Johns Hopkins University; Pennsylvania State University
- Scientific career
- Workplaces: Johns Hopkins University
- Thesis: Visual impairment and mobility disability: the Salisbury Eye Evaluation Study (2013)
- Doctoral advisor: Sheila West

Bonnielin Swenor (née Sceurman) is an American epidemiologist who is the endowed professor of disability health and justice and director of the Johns Hopkins University Disability Health Research Center. Her work uses data-driven approaches to advance equity for people with disabilities and change public perceptions of disability, away from "living with disability" and toward "thriving with a disability".

== Early life and education ==
Swenor was an undergraduate at Pennsylvania State University, where she majored in microbiology and biochemistry. She moved to the Johns Hopkins University for graduate research and specialized in epidemiology. She completed her doctoral research under the supervision of Sheila West. Her doctorate considered visual impairment and mobility disability. As a student, she experienced rapid vision loss: multiple broken blood vessels in her retinas. She was a postdoctoral fellow at the National Institute on Aging, where she worked alongside Stephanie Studenski and Luigi Ferrucci.

== Research and career ==
Swenor started her academic career at Johns Hopkins University, where she founded the Disability Health Research Center. She is committed to ending inequities impacting people with disabilities, and her work spans a range of areas from inequities in healthcare to transportation to food access. She has said that her research is motivated by her own experiences of living with vision impairment. She joined the Wilmer Ophthalmological Institute in 2014 and later joined the Johns Hopkins School of Nursing in 2022.

She has developed a novel 'disability data justice' approach to research, which uses data to support accountability and equity for disabled people. Examples of this work include a dashboard tracking inequities in the allocation of COVID-19 vaccine for people with disabilities across states and assessing the accessibility of COVID-19 vaccine information and registration webpages at state health departments.

Swenor has argued that scientists with disabilities should have improved access to scientific funding. Although one in four Americans have a disability, only around 10% of employed scientists have one. In an interview, Swenor said, "To reflect the realities of our society, we should have far more people with disabilities working in research and medicine,". She has argued that open-access research can benefit people with disabilities, who struggle to access data and peer-reviewed publications in accessible formats. She believes that data must be accessible and that partnerships with the disability community are key for public health strategies. She co-chaired the National Institutes of Health (NIH) Advisory Committee to the Director (ACD) Working Group on Diversity, Subgroup on Individuals with Disabilities which developed a set of landmark recommendations on how the NIH can improve the inclusion of disabled people in research and the biomedical workforce. In 2022, she was a speaker at the White House Office of Science and Technology and Policy (OSTP) Summit on STEMM Equity and Excellence.

In 2023, Swenor spearheaded a national effort that brought together researchers, disability advocates, and civil rights leaders together and urged the National Institutes of Health (NIH) to designate people with disabilities as a 'health disparity' population. This included peer-reviewed research and a sign-on letter campaign with Dr. Jae Kennedy from Washington State University and former Congressman Tony Coelho, which yielded over 1,500 signatures in less than 48 hours. Less than one month later, the NIH provided this designation on September 26, 2023, which was the 50th anniversary of the Rehabilitation Act.

In 2024, along with colleagues Drs. Scott Landes from Syracuse University and Jean Hall from the University of Kansas, Swenor co-led research and national advocacy opposing the US Census Bureau's proposed changes to disability questions in the American Community Survey (ACS) and calling for a need to engage with the disability community. These efforts led to the submission of over 12,000 public comments opposing this change in response to a related Federal Register Notice. As a result, the US Census Bureau halted the process of changing these questions and pledged to improve efforts to include disabled people.

== Selected publications ==
- Brian P Lazzaro; Bonnielin K Sceurman; Andrew G Clark (1 March 2004). "Genetic basis of natural variation in D. melanogaster antibacterial immunity". Science. 303 (5665): 1873–1876. doi:10.1126/science.1092447. ISSN 0036-8075. PMID 15031506. Wikidata Q47924551.
- Swenor, Bonnielin K; Ramulu, Pradeep Y; Willis, Jeffery R; Friedman, David S; Lin, Frank R (2013). "The prevalence of concurrent hearing and vision impairment in the United States". JAMA Internal Medicine. 173 (4): 312–313. doi:10.1001/jamainternmed.2013.1880. PMC 3875214. PMID 23338042.
- Swenor, Bonnielin; Meeks, Lisa M (2019). "Disability Inclusion - Moving beyond mission statements". NEJM. 380 (22): 2089–2091. doi:10.1056/NEJMp1900348. PMID 31141629. S2CID 169038170.
- Swenor, Bonnielin K; Munoz, Beatriz; Meeks, Lisa M (2020). "A Decade of Decline: Grant funding for researchers with disabilities 2008 to 2018". PLOS ONE. 15 (3) e0228686. Bibcode:2020PLoSO..1528686S. doi:10.1371/journal.pone.0228686. PMC 7053734. PMID 32126090.
- Swenor, Bonnielin K (2022). "A Need for Disability Data Justice". Health Affairs Forefront. 15. doi:10.1377/forefront.20220818.426231.
