= Physical & Occupational Therapy in Geriatrics =

- Discipline: Geriatrics
- Language: English
- Edited by: Edgar Ramos Vieira, PT, PhD

Publication details
- History: 1981–present
- Publisher: Taylor & Francis
- Frequency: Quarterly

Standard abbreviations
- ISO 4: Phys. Occup. Ther. Geriatr.

Indexing
- CODEN: POTGD7
- ISSN: 0270-3181 (print); 1541-3152 (web)
- LCCN: 81643020
- OCLC no.: 06389623

Links
- Journal homepage

Physical & Occupational Therapy in Geriatrics is a peer-reviewed medical journal that acts as a forum for allied health professionals as well as others with a focus on prevention and rehabilitation of health conditions in older adults and share information on clinical experience, research, and therapeutic practice. It is published by Taylor & Francis and edited by Edgar Ramos Vieira.
