= Geriatric psychology =

Subfield of psychology in use

Geriatric psychology is a subfield of psychology that specializes in the mental and physical health of individuals in the later stages of life. These specialized psychologists study a variety of psychological abilities that deplete as aging occurs such as memory, learning capabilities, and coordination. Geriatric psychologists work with elderly clients to conduct the diagnosis, study, and treatment of certain mental illnesses in a variety of workplace settings. Common areas of practice include loneliness in old age, depression, dementia, Alzheimer's disease, vascular dementia, and Parkinson's disease.

== Geriatric psychology vs. geriatric psychiatry ==
Geriatric psychology

Geriatric psychology is based upon the study of mental functions with aging. The psychologist's purpose is to observe how the neurological and physiological process of an elderly adult's brain affects their behaviors in daily life. When a psychologist is specialized in geriatrics, they provide care for declining brain functions to improve quality of life.

Geriatric psychiatry

Geriatric psychiatry is a subspecialty of psychiatry dealing with the research, diagnosis and treatment of mental disorders in the later stages of life. The field composes of the diagnosis, treatment, and management of areas such as depression, dementia, and Alzheimer's disease. A geriatric psychiatrist is also a licensed doctor that can prescribe medications for elderly patients. Psychiatrists require extensive education and a degree from a medical school.

== Role of the geriatric psychologist ==
A geriatric psychologist specializes in the treatment of the elderly. This treatment can include mental health problems or aid in understanding and coping with the aging process. In order to become a geriatric psychologist, one must obtain a doctoral degree in psychology and specialize in adult development and aging. Once the degree is obtained, geriatric psychologists will usually work in hospitals, mental health clinics, rehabilitation centers, nursing homes, and research centers.

Geriatric psychologists spend most of their workday addressing mental health issues in older adults and counseling those that need it. They also aid in the diagnosis of age-related problems. In order to check for mental health issues, geriatric psychologists will conduct clinical interviews, neuropsychological tests, and behavioral observations.

== History ==
Geriatric psychology began in 1978 with a spike in interest in mental health and the effects of aging. There was a slow increase in the number of aging adults in the U.S. population. There was a small group of 11 people who met together to talk about late-life mental health needs and the field of geriatrics. This meeting later created the American Association of Geriatric Psychology (AAGP). As time has gone on the small group has turned into a very large group of people dedicated to the well being of the aging population.

== Common areas of practice ==
=== Loneliness in elderly people ===
Loneliness is an emotional response to the process of social isolation. It typically entails the feelings of anxiousness due to the lack of social connectedness or communication with others. Research has shown that loneliness has negative impacts on biological, cognitive and immune functioning. It is prevalent throughout all age groups from childhood to old age. The history of elderly loneliness is particular.

Nurses and other individuals who work in association with the elderly learn the various theories of loneliness, as they may need to implement these perspectives into enhancing the lives of their patients. They are particularly problematic in old age due to the changes an individual goes through such as decreasing economic stability and resources, changes in family structures, reduced social communication and the death of a relative or spouse.

The most researched outcomes of loneliness are depression and cardiovascular health. Lonely individuals have found to have increased arterial stiffness, decreased blood circulation and associated with elevated blood pressure.

Social isolation and feelings of loneliness are also major risk factors for poor cognitive and physical health. A poor sense of social connectedness has a negative impact on neural processing and cognitive abilities. A meta-analysis and systematic review of 16 studies found that initially dementia-free older adults had a significantly increased risk of developing dementia when experiencing extreme levels of loneliness. The study also concluded that loneliness led to lower cognitive abilities and a rapid decline in cognition.

==== Interventions: Animal Companions ====
One study revealed that loneliness in elderly veterans with PTSD might find relief from loneliness when adopting a dog. Two groups were established: those who adopted a dog right away, and those who adopted a dog after a 6-month delay. The Immediate Group demonstrated significantly less loneliness (p = .034) and the Delayed Group worsened, yet was not statistically significant of this change (p = .303). The difference between the two groups was statistically significant, however (p = .026). Overall, the veterans did indeed feel that the dogs were good companions. They found that having the dog led to more social interaction, such as taking the dog on walks leading to them having to walk outside and thus, interact with others

Animal assisted therapy (AAT) might also help alleviate loneliness in veterans with PTSD. AAT involves having participants interact with animals as a form of therapy, such as playing with the animal, holding them, petting them, talking to them, etc. The researchers did in fact find that the residents experienced reduced feelings of loneliness after AAT, and many of them wished to have their own pets. Even the minimum 1-time-per-week sessions yielded significant reduction in loneliness.

Another study found pet ownership is correlated with lower levels of loneliness. Researchers found that older adults who did own a pet were over a third less likely to feel lonely.

=== Depression ===
Depression in the elderly community can have severe consequences, which is why it is an important public health problem and research area. Older adults facing this debilitating condition are less likely to endorse affective symptoms and are more likely to instead display cognitive changes, somatic symptoms, and loss of interest than are younger adults. It is comorbid with "morbidity, increased risk of suicide, decreased physical, cognitive and social functioning, and greater self-neglect", all of which are associated with an increase in mortality.

Risk factors

A common pathway to depression in older adults may consist of predisposing risks as well as the life changes experienced in old age. The development of late-life depression has several risk factors that likely compose of "cognitive diathesis, age-associated neurobiological changes, genetic vulnerabilities, and stressful life events".

Insomnia is often an overlooked factor in late-life depression. Impacts of sleep deprivation are reduced glucose tolerance, elevated evening cortisol levels, and increased sympathetic nervous system activity. Sleep quality at an old age is just as important as sleep duration to avoid lack of sleep. Research shows that feelings of loneliness and depression can result in poor sleep quality and daytime dysfunctions. These daytime impairments include physical and intellectual fatigue, irritability, and low cognitive abilities.

=== Dementia ===
Dementia is a variety of symptoms that apply to a decline in mental ability, not a specific disease. There are a variety of different symptoms that affect one's behavior as well as their memory and thought processes. These impairments make it hard to carry out day-to-day activities. They also give way to emotional problems as well as decreased motivation for living. Due to dementia not being a disorder of consciousness, a person's conscious is not usually affected. Geriatric psychologists work with dementia by aiding in the diagnosis of this disease. This is done through various cognitive tests and assessments. They will also look at research and potential treatment for dementia.

=== Alzheimer's disease ===
Alzheimer's disease is the most common type of dementia, accounting for 60-80 percent of dementia cases. The effects of Alzheimer's are subtle at first but worsen as time passes. A common early symptom relates to difficulty recalling events of the recent past. Numerous symptoms arise as the disease progresses. These symptoms include: speech problems, disoriented states, issues with mood, lack of motivation, etc. Similar to dementia, a geriatric psychologist's role regarding Alzheimer's disease is the assessment, treatment, and research of the disease. Similarly, enrichment gardens may prove beneficial as mentioned before with other forms of dementia. However, there is currently no known cure for the disease.

=== Vascular dementia ===
Vascular dementia, the second most common type of dementia, is the result of a stroke. Often times, it is difficult to differentiate between various types of dementia due to overlying symptoms and pathology. Ultimately, vascular dementia is the result of difficulties involved in blood supply to the brain. A geriatric psychologist aids in the assessment, diagnosing, treatment, and research of vascular dementia. Non-pharmacological interventions have been researched as well. A meta-analysis on this topic found that non-pharmacological interventions had the most statistically significant outcomes when used complementarily to conventional treatments. Methods involving acupuncture tended to yield the most significant results in the studies analyzed. This could be due to acupuncture's potential ability to support synaptic plasticity, myelin integrity, and more.

=== Parkinson's disease ===
Parkinson's disease is a movement disorder that has symptoms like tremors, slowed movement, stiffness, and impaired balance. It primarily affects the motor system, which supports motor functions used for movement. As the disease advances, it is common for individuals to experience dementia that is specifically associated with Parkinson's disease. Those who suffer from this disease can also experience issues with sensory systems. A geriatric psychologist's role for those with Parkinson's disease would be helping the person diagnosed deal with the stress they may encounter regarding Parkinson's disease. Since it is not a brain disorder, the geriatric psychologist would not help with diagnosing or the treatment of the disease. Research has been conducted to evaluate the effectiveness of exercise in helping those with Parkinson's disease. One study found that there is potential in improving gait, balance, and strength. However, research is limited and researchers are unsure about the full potential of exercise as a form of intervention. Results from the study about improving fall risk is unclear.

== See also ==
- Developmental psychology
