= Geriatric intensive-care unit =

- Specialty: Intensive care medicine

Geriatric intensive care unit is a special intensive care unit dedicated to management of critically ill elderly.

== Origin ==
Geriatric intensive care units began because the world population is aging. Geriatric medicine is distinct from adult or pediatric medicine, especially if they are critically ill. Geriatric medicine was not included in the curricula of undergraduate or advanced medical training until recently, so not all critical care physicians are oriented to the specific needs of geriatric patients. Despite the fact that many critically ill patients are older, the training of critical care teams still lacks a geriatric focus.

Older adults admitted to intensive care units can contract severe infections, such as MRSA or systemic fungal infections, and may need special post-operative analgesia. People age 75+ may need assessment by special instruments to predict their ICU prognosis. One quotation has said "geriatric ICUs are the future".

== World distribution ==
Geriatric care units are present in Japan, United States, China, Egypt, Europe France, Italy, Iran, and India.

== Training & education programs ==
Physicians are trained in geriatric medicine & critical care medicine.

Nurses receive special training in critical care of elderly in their basic training, advanced and clinical training.

== Ventilators ==
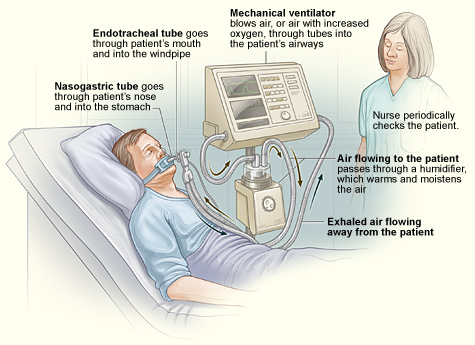
Ventilator parts

A geriatric ventilator is a machine that provides mechanical ventilation by moving breathable air into and out of the lungs, to deliver breaths to a geriatric patient who is physically unable to breathe, or breathing insufficiently.

=== Open-source ventilators ===
A geriatric open-source ventilator uses open-source hardware.

== See also ==
- Geriatrics
- Intensive care unit
- Open-source hardware
- Ventilator
