= American Geriatrics Society =

Non-profit professional society (founded 1942)

The American Geriatrics Society (AGS) is a non-profit professional society founded on June 11, 1942, for health care professionals practicing geriatric medicine. Among the founding physicians were Dr. Ignatz Leo Nascher, who coined the term "geriatrics", Dr. Malford W. Thewlis, who was named the first executive secretary of the Society, and Dr. Lucien Stark who was appointed the first AGS president.

== History ==
In 1999 the Society established the AGS Health in Aging Foundation (HiAF) to further advance aging research, educate the public and legislators about healthcare for older people, and encourage the public to advocate for quality geriatrics care. The Association of Directors of Geriatrics Academic Programs (ADGAP), established in 1990, became a supporting organization of the Society in 2002. The AGS now counts nearly 6,000 geriatrics healthcare providers including geriatricians, geriatrics nurse practitioners, physician assistants, pharmacists, and social workers as members.

== Membership ==
Eligible members originally only included physicians with an interest in geriatrics who had graduated from a recognized medical school and were members in good standing of a state medical society. In 1997, membership was opened to other professional members of the geriatrics interdisciplinary team.

The American Geriatrics Society (AGS) is devoted to improving the health, independence, and quality of life of all older people. The Society provides leadership to healthcare professionals, policy makers, and the public by implementing and advocating for programs in patient care, research, professional and public education, and public policy.

The AGS Annual Scientific Meeting has occurred every year since 1946.

== Publications ==
The Society has a main peer-reviewed journal, Journal of the American Geriatrics Society. Its other journals include the Annals of Long-term Care, Geriatric Nursing, and the Journal of Gerontological Nursing. The Society also publishes the Geriatrics Review Syllabus (now in its 9th edition) and the Geriatric Nursing Review Syllabus (now in its 5th edition). The Society has published clinical practice guidelines on multicultural care, LGBT care for older people, potentially inappropriate medications for older adults, perioperative care, postoperative delirium, feeding tubes, persistent pain, diabetes mellitus, falls, making medical treatment decisions for unbefriended older adults. Its pocket tool, Geriatrics at Your Fingertips, has average annual sales of over 15,000 copies.
