= Journal of the American Geriatrics Society =

Peer-reviewed academic journal

- Discipline: Geriatrics
- Language: English
- Edited by: Joseph G. Ouslander

Publication details
- History: 1942–present
- Publisher: Wiley
- Impact factor: 6.3 (2022)

Standard abbreviations
- ISO 4: J. Am. Geriatr. Soc.

Indexing
- ISSN: 1532-5415

Links
- Journal homepage

The Journal of the American Geriatrics Society is a peer-reviewed medical journal of the American Geriatrics Society.
