= Geriatric neurology =

Branch of medicine that studies neurologic disorders in elderly

Geriatric neurology is the branch of medicine that studies neurologic disorders in elderly.

== Origin ==
In 1991 Advanced Fellowship Program in Geriatric Neurology was started by the Department of Veterans Affairs. Many veterans suffered from neurodegenerative changes such as Alzheimer's disease, Lewy Body dementia, Parkinson's disease, vascular dementia, and other age related central nervous system changes. The implications for family caregivers and the healthcare system were enormous. So the Geriatric Neurology Fellowship Program developed a cadre of physicians for academic leadership in this complex, interdisciplinary field.

The subspecialty of Geriatric neurology is defined by its expertise in the diagnosis, treatment, and care of neurological conditions that affect elderly and by its unique body of knowledge regarding the aging nervous system, its vulnerability to specific neurological disorders, and its influence on the prevalence and expression of neurological disease. Neurologists are called with increasing frequency to provide care for older adults. As the number of elderly in the population increases, there will be a concomitant increase in the prevalence of acute and chronic neurological disorders associated with advancing age. Through training fellowships, the neurological community will endeavor to master, codify and transfer the knowledge and skills to effectively care for the elderly with neurological disorders. Behavioral Neurology Clinic at the Perlman Ambulatory Care Center.

The Geriatric Neurology Section of the American Academy of Neurology increases awareness of, and fosters interest and expertise in, issues of geriatric neurology in the areas of patient care, research, education, and public policy, and enhances the role of neurologists in geriatric training programs.

== Training & education programs ==
Fellowships for training on geriatric neurology were established.

The Veterans Affair Geriatric Neurology Fellowship Program provides two years of post-residency research, education, and clinical learning opportunities to eligible physician neurologists. Graduates are expected to be role models in leading, developing, conducting, and evaluating innovative research, education, and clinical care in the field of geriatric neurology.

The American Academy of Neurology (AAN) Foundation and the Alzheimer's Association established a two-year Clinical Research Training Fellowship in Alzheimer's disease research. The fellowship is supported by the AAN Foundation and the Alzheimer's Association.

The American Academy of Neurology offers a prize for Research in Pick's, Alzheimer's, and Related Diseases. The American Academy of Neurology offers an award for research in Geriatric Neurology.

Clinical courses and books on geriatric neurology are available.

A journal dedicated to geriatric neurology & psychiatry was issued.

== Organisation & societies ==
The Geriatric Neurology Section of the American Academy of Neurology was organized in 1989 to increase awareness of and foster interest and expertise in issues of geriatric neurology in the areas of patient care, research, education, and public policy, and to enhance the role of neurologists in geriatric training programs.

The United Council for Neurologic Subspecialties (UCNS) has approved geriatric neurology as its seventh subspecialty in May 2007.

Geriatric Neurology Related Societies
