= Geriatrics =

Medical specialty that focuses on health care of elderly people

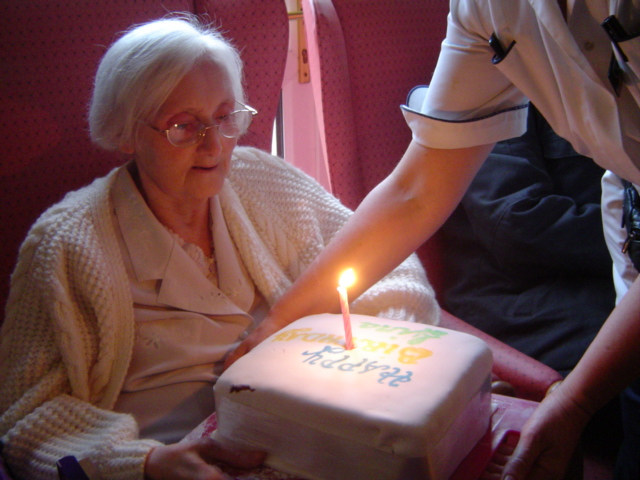
- An older woman in a residential care home receiving a birthday cake
- Significant diseases: Dementia, arthritis, osteoporosis, osteoarthritis, rheumatoid arthritis, Parkinson's disease, atherosclerosis, heart disease, high blood pressure
- Specialist: Geriatrician

Geriatrician
Occupation
- Names: Physician
- Occupation type: Specialty
- Activity sectors: Medicine

Description
- Education required: Doctor of Medicine (M.D.); Doctor of Osteopathic medicine (D.O.); Bachelor of Medicine, Bachelor of Surgery (M.B.B.S.); Bachelor of Medicine, Bachelor of Surgery (MBChB)
- Fields of employment: Hospitals, Clinics

Geriatrics, or geriatric medicine, is a medical specialty focused on addressing the unique health needs of older adults. The term geriatrics originates from the Greek γέρων geron meaning "old man", and ιατρός iatros meaning "healer". It aims to promote health by preventing, diagnosing and treating disease in older adults. Older adults may be healthy, but they're more likely to have chronic health concerns and require more medical care. There is no defined age at which patients may be under the care of a geriatrician, or geriatric physician, a physician who specializes in the care of older people. Rather, this decision is guided by individual patient needs and the caregiving structures available to them. This care may benefit those who are managing multiple chronic conditions or experiencing significant age-related complications that threaten quality of daily life. Geriatric care may be indicated if caregiving responsibilities become increasingly stressful or medically complex for family and caregivers to manage independently.

There is a distinction between geriatrics and gerontology. Gerontology is the multidisciplinary study of the aging process, defined as the decline in organ function over time in the absence of injury, illness, environmental risks or behavioral risk factors. However, geriatrics is sometimes called medical gerontology.

== Scope ==
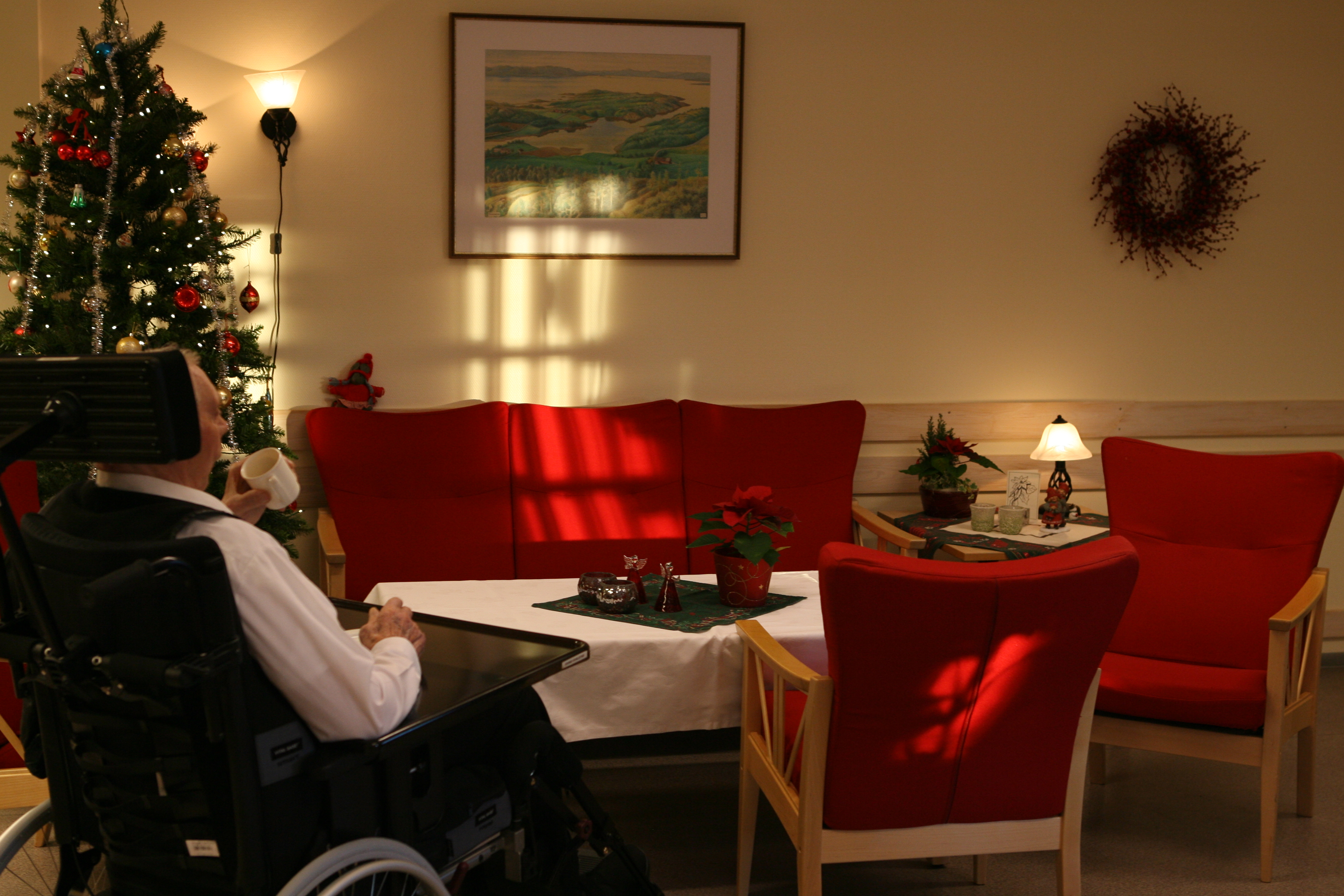
Elderly man at a nursing home in Norway

=== Differences between adult and geriatric medicine ===
Geriatric providers receive specialized training in caring for older patients and promoting healthy ageing. The care provided is largely based on shared-decision making and is driven by patient goals and preferences, which can vary from preserving function, improving quality of life, or prolonging years of life. A guiding mnemonic commonly used by geriatricians in the United States and Canada is the 5 M's of Geriatrics which describes mind, mobility, multicomplexity, medications and matters most to elicit patient values.

It is common for older adults to be managing multiple long-term conditions (multi-morbidity). Age-associated changes in physiology drive a compounded increase in susceptibility to illness, disease-associated morbidity, and death. Moreover, common diseases may present atypically in older patients, adding further diagnostic and therapeutic complexity to patient care.

Geriatrics is highly interdisciplinary consisting of specialty providers from the fields of medicine, nursing, pharmacy, social work, and physical and occupational therapy. Older patients can receive care related to medication management, pain management, psychiatric and memory care, rehabilitation, long-term nursing care, nutrition, and different forms of therapy including physical, occupational, and speech. Non-medical considerations include social services, transitional care, advanced directives, power of attorney, and other legal considerations.

=== Increased complexity ===
The decline in physiological reserve in organs makes the elderly develop some kinds of diseases and have more complications from mild problems (such as dehydration from a mild gastroenteritis). Multiple problems may compound: A mild fever in elderly persons may cause confusion, which can advance to a fall and to a fracture of the neck of the femur ("broken hip"). The presentation of disease in older persons may be vague and non-specific, or it may include delirium or falls. (Pneumonia, for example, may present with low-grade fever and confusion, rather than the high fever and cough seen in younger people.) Some elderly people may find it hard to describe their symptoms in words, especially if the disease is causing confusion, or if they have cognitive impairment. Delirium in the elderly may be caused by a minor problem such as constipation or by something as serious and life-threatening as a heart attack. Many of these problems are treatable, if the root cause can be discovered.

=== Cognition ===
Cognitive aging is characterized by declines in fluid abilities like processing speed, working memory, and executive function, while crystallized abilities such as knowledge remain stable (Anstey & Low, 2004; Murman, 2015). Age-related changes in brain structure and function correlate with these cognitive declines (Murman, 2015). Older adults show weaker occipital activity and stronger prefrontal and parietal activity during cognitive tasks, possibly reflecting compensation (Cabeza et al., 2004). Subjective cognitive complaints are common among older adults, particularly regarding working memory (Newson & Kemps, 2006). Various factors influence cognitive aging, including genetics, lifestyle, and health (Bäckman et al., 2004). Cognitive impairments can progress to mild cognitive impairment (MCI) or dementia (Mendoza-Ruvalcaba et al., 2018).

MCI is a transitional state between normal aging and dementia, affecting 10-20% of adults over 65 (Schwarz, 2015). Geriatricians encounter MCI patients in various care settings, with diagnoses relying on clinical assessment and mental status examinations (Tangalos & Petersen, 2018). MCI is highly prevalent among older adults with depression and may persist after depression remits (Lee et al., 2006). While MCI is considered a high-risk condition for developing Alzheimer's disease, there is heterogeneity in its presentation and outcomes (Petersen et al., 2001).

Dementia is a prevalent condition in geriatric populations, affecting cognitive function and daily activities (Talawar, 2018; Mirzapure et al., 2022). Alzheimer's disease is the most common cause, accounting for 40-80% of cases (Mirzapure et al., 2022; Chulakadabba et al., 2020). Geriatric patients with dementia often have comorbidities and other geriatric syndromes, requiring holistic and integrated care (Chulakadabba et al., 2020; Nguyen et al., 2023). Geriatricians play a crucial role in dementia care, but many feel current training is inadequate and seek more structured experiences (Mayne et al., 2014). Improving access to geriatricians and enhancing general practitioners' diagnostic skills could improve timely and accurate dementia diagnosis (Mansfield et al., 2022). However, there are significant shortages of dementia specialists, particularly in rural areas (Liu et al., 2024; Christley et al., 2022). Geriatricians support comprehensive post-diagnosis information provision, including sensitive topics like advance care planning (Mansfield et al., 2022). Collaboration between specialists and family physicians is essential, with specialists often handling contentious issues like driving competency (Hum et al., 2014). Geriatric training may influence end-of-life care patterns for dementia patients (Gotanda et al., 2023). A geriatrics perspective emphasizes prevention, considering lifestyle factors that promote healthy cognitive aging (Steffens, 2018).

There are various tests to assess cognition. These include the MMSE, the Montreal Cognitive Assessment, and GERRI (geriatric evaluation by relative's rating instrument), which is a diagnostic tool for rating cognitive function, social function and mood in geriatric patients.

=== Geriatric pharmacology ===
Older people require specific attention to medications. Older people particularly are subjected to polypharmacy (taking multiple medications) given their accumulation of multiple chronic diseases. Many of these individuals have also self-prescribed herbal medications and over-the-counter drugs. This polypharmacy, in combination with geriatric status, may increase the risk of drug interactions or adverse drug reactions. Pharmacokinetic and pharmacodynamic changes arise with older age, impairing their ability to metabolize and respond to drugs. Each of the four pharmacokinetic mechanisms (absorption, distribution, metabolism, excretion) is disrupted by age-related physiologic changes. For example, overall decreased hepatic function can interfere with the clearance or metabolism of drugs and reductions in kidney function can affect renal elimination. Pharmacodynamic changes lead to altered sensitivity to drugs in geriatric patients, such as increased pain relief with morphine use. Therefore, geriatric individuals require specialized pharmacological care that is informed by these age-related changes.

=== Geriatric syndromes ===
Geriatric syndromes are a term used to describe a group of clinical conditions that are highly prevalent in elderly people. These syndromes are not caused by specific pathology or disease, rather, they are a manifestation of multifactorial conditions affecting several organ systems. Common conditions include frailty, functional decline, falls, loss of continence, and malnutrition, amongst others.

==== Frailty ====
Frailty is marked by a decline in physiological reserve, increased vulnerability to physiological and emotional stressors, and loss of function. This may present as progressive and unintentional weight loss, fatigue, muscular weakness, and decreased mobility. It is associated with increased injuries, hospitalization, and adverse clinical outcomes.

==== Functional decline ====
Functional disability can arise from a decline in physical function and/or cognitive function. It is associated with an acquired difficulty in performing basic everyday tasks resulting in an increased dependence of other individuals and/or medical devices. These tasks are sub-divided into basic activities of daily living (ADL) and instrumental activities of daily living (IADL) and are commonly used as an indicator of a person's functional status.

Activities of daily living (ADL) are fundamental skills needed to care for oneself, including feeding, personal hygiene, toileting, transferring and ambulating. Instrumental activities of daily living (IADL) describe more complex skills needed to allow oneself to live independently in a community, including cooking, housekeeping, managing one's finances and medications. Routine monitoring of ADL and IADL is an important functional assessment used by clinicians to determine the extent of support and care to provide to elderly adults and their caregivers. It serves as a qualitative measurement of function over time and predicts the need for alternative living arrangements or models of care, including senior housing apartments, skilled nursing facilities, palliative, hospice or home-based care.

==== Falls ====
Falls are the leading cause of emergency department admissions and hospitalizations in adults age 65 and older, many of which result in significant injury and permanent disability. As certain risk factors can be modifiable for the purpose of reducing falls, this highlights an opportunity for intervention and risk reduction. Modifiable factors include:

- Improving balance and muscle strength.
- Removing environmental hazards.
- Encouraging use of assistive devices.
- Treating chronic conditions.
- Adjusting medication.

==== Urinary incontinence ====
Urinary incontinence or overactive bladder symptoms is defined as unintentionally urinating oneself. These symptoms can be caused by medications that increase urine output and frequency (e.g. anti-hypertensives and diuretics), urinary tract infections, pelvic organ prolapse, pelvic floor dysfunction, and diseases that damage the nerves that regulate bladder emptying. Other musculoskeletal conditions affecting mobility should be considered, as these can make accessing bathrooms difficult.

==== Malnutrition ====
Malnutrition and poor nutritional status is an area of concern, affecting 12% to 50% of hospitalized elderly patients and 23% to 50% of institutionalized elderly patients living in long-term care facilities such as assisted living communities and skilled nursing facilities. As malnutrition can occur due to a combination of physiologic, pathologic, psychologic and socioeconomic factors, it can be difficult to identify effective interventions. Physiologic factors include reduced smell and taste, and a decreased metabolic rate affecting nutritional food intake. Unintentional weight loss can result from pathologic factors, including a wide range of chronic diseases that affect cognitive function, directly impact digestion (e.g. poor dentition, gastrointestinal cancers, gastroesophageal reflux disease) or may be managed with dietary restrictions (e.g. congestive heart failure, diabetes mellitus, hypertension). Psychologic factors include conditions including depression, anorexia, and grief.

=== Practical concerns ===
Functional abilities, independence, and quality of life issues are central concerns to geriatricians and their patients. Elderly people generally want to live independently as long as possible, which requires them to be able to engage in self-care and other activities of daily living. A geriatrician may be able to provide information about elder care options, and refer people to home care services, skilled nursing facilities, assisted living facilities, and hospice as appropriate.

Frail elderly individuals may choose to decline some kinds of medical care, because the risk-benefit ratio is different. For example, frail elderly women routinely stop screening mammograms, because breast cancer is typically a slowly growing disease that would cause them no pain, impairment, or loss of life before they would die of other causes. Frail people are also at significant risk of complications following surgery and the need for extended care, and an accurate prediction—based on validated measures, rather than how old the patient's face looks—can help older patients make fully informed choices about their options. Assessment of older patients before elective surgeries can accurately predict the patients' recovery trajectories. One frailty scale uses five items: unintentional weight loss, muscle weakness, exhaustion, low physical activity, and slowed walking speed. A healthy person scores 0; a very frail person scores 5. Compared to non-frail elderly people, people with moderate frailty scores (2 or 3) are twice as likely to have post-surgical complications, spend 50% more time in the hospital, and are three times as likely to be discharged to a skilled nursing facility instead of to their own homes. Frail elderly patients (score of 4 or 5) who were living at home before the surgery have even worse outcomes, with the risk of being discharged to a nursing home rising to twenty times the rate for non-frail elderly people.

== Subspecialties and related services ==
Some diseases commonly seen in elderly are rare in adults, e.g., dementia, delirium, falls. As societies aged, many specialized geriatric- and geriatrics-related services emerged including:

=== Medical ===
- Geriatric cardiology or cardiogeriatrics.
- Geriatric dentistry.
- Geriatric dermatology.
- Geriatric diagnostic imaging.
- Geriatric emergency medicine.
- Geriatric nephrology.
- Geriatric neurology.
- Geriatric oncology.
- Geriatric physical examination of interest especially to physicians & physician assistants.
- Geriatric psychiatry or psychogeriatrics (focus on dementia, delirium, depression and other psychiatric disorders).
- Geriatric public health or preventive geriatrics.
- Geriatric rehabilitation.
- Geriatric rheumatology (focus on joints and soft tissue disorders in elderly).
- Geriatric sexology (focus on sexuality in aged people).
- Geriatric subspeciality medical clinics (such as geriatric anticoagulation clinic, geriatric assessment clinic, falls and balance clinic, continence clinic, palliative care clinic, elderly pain clinic, cognition and memory disorders clinic).

=== Surgical ===
- Geriatric orthopaedics or orthogeriatrics (close cooperation with orthopedic surgery and a focus on osteoporosis and rehabilitation).
- Geriatric cardiothoracic surgery.
- Geriatric urology.
- Geriatric otolaryngology.
- Geriatric general surgery.
- Geriatric trauma.
- Geriatric gynecology.
- Geriatric ophthalmology.
- Perioperative medicine for Older People having Surgery (POPS).

=== Other geriatrics subspecialties ===
- Geriatric anesthesia (focuses on anesthesia & perioperative care of elderly).
- Geriatric intensive-care unit: (a special type of intensive care unit dedicated to critically ill elderly).
- Geriatric nursing (focuses on nursing of elderly patients and the aged).
- Geriatric nutrition.
- Geriatric occupational therapy.
- Geriatric pain management.
- Geriatric pharmacy.
- Geriatric optometry.
- Geriatric physical therapy.
- Geriatric podiatry.
- Geriatric psychology.
- Geriatric speech-language pathology (focuses on neurological disorders such as dysphagia, stroke, aphasia, and traumatic brain injury).
- Geriatric mental health counselor/specialist (focuses on treatment more so than assessment).
- Geriatric audiology.

== History ==
A number of physicians in the Byzantine Empire studied geriatrics, with doctors like Aëtius of Amida evidently specializing in the field. Alexander of Tralles viewed the process of aging as a natural and inevitable form of marasmus, caused by the loss of moisture in body tissue. The works of Aëtius describe the mental and physical symptoms of aging. Theophilus Protospatharius and Joannes Actuarius also discussed the topic in their medical works. Byzantine physicians typically drew on the works of Oribasius and recommended that elderly patients consume a diet rich in foods that provide "heat and moisture". They also recommended frequent bathing, massaging, rest, and low-intensity exercise regimens.

In The Canon of Medicine, written by Avicenna in 1025, the author was concerned with how "old folk need plenty of sleep" and how their bodies should be anointed with oil, and recommended exercises such as walking or horse-riding. Thesis III of the Canon discussed the diet suitable for old people, and dedicated several sections to elderly patients who become constipated.

The Arab physician Algizar (c. 898–980) wrote a book on the medicine and health of the elderly. He also wrote a book on sleep disorders and another one on forgetfulness and how to strengthen memory, and a treatise on causes of mortality. Another Arab physician in the 9th century, Ishaq ibn Hunayn (died 910), the son of Nestorian Christian scholar Hunayn Ibn Ishaq, wrote a Treatise on Drugs for Forgetfulness.

George Day published the Diseases of Advanced Life in 1849, one of the first publications on the subject of geriatric medicine. The first modern geriatric hospital was founded in Belgrade, Serbia, in 1881 by doctor Laza Lazarević.

The term geriatrics was proposed in 1908 by Ilya Ilyich Mechnikov, Laurate of the Nobel Prize for Medicine and later by 1909 by Ignatz Leo Nascher, former Chief of Clinic in the Mount Sinai Hospital Outpatient Department (New York City) and a "father" of geriatrics in the United States.

Modern geriatrics in the United Kingdom began with the "mother" of geriatrics, Marjory Warren. Warren emphasized that rehabilitation was essential to the care of older people. Using her experiences as a physician in a London Workhouse infirmary, she believed that merely keeping older people fed until they died was not enough; they needed diagnosis, treatment, care, and support. She found that patients, some of whom had previously been bedridden, were able to gain some degree of independence with the correct assessment and treatment.

The practice of geriatrics in the UK is also one with a multidisciplinary history. It values all the professions, not just medicine, for their contributions in optimizing the well-being and independence of older people.

Another innovator of British geriatrics is Bernard Isaacs, who described the "giants" of geriatrics mentioned above: immobility and instability, incontinence, and impaired intellect. Isaacs asserted that, if examined closely enough, all common problems with older people relate to one or more of these giants.

The care of older people in the UK has been advanced by the implementation of the National Service Frameworks for Older People, which outlines key areas for attention.

== Geriatrician training ==
=== United States ===
In the United States, geriatricians are primary-care physicians (D.O. or M.D.) who are board-certified in either family medicine or internal medicine and who have also acquired the additional training necessary to obtain the Certificate of Added Qualifications (CAQ) in geriatric medicine. Geriatricians have developed an expanded expertise in the aging process, the impact of aging on illness patterns, drug therapy in seniors, health maintenance, and rehabilitation. They serve in a variety of roles including hospital care, long-term care, home care, and terminal care. They are frequently involved in ethics consultations to represent the unique health and diseases patterns seen in seniors. The model of care practiced by geriatricians is heavily focused on addressing working closely with other disciplines such as nurses, pharmacists, therapists, and social workers.

=== United Kingdom ===
In the United Kingdom, most geriatricians are hospital physicians, whereas others focus on community geriatrics in particular. Although originally a distinct clinical specialty, it has been integrated as a specialization of general medicine since the late 1970s. Most geriatricians are, therefore, accredited for both. Unlike in the United States, geriatric medicine is a major specialty in the United Kingdom and are the single most numerous internal medicine specialists.

=== Canada ===
In Canada, there are two pathways that can be followed in order to work as a physician in a geriatric setting.

1. Doctors of Medicine (M.D.) can complete a three-year core internal medicine residency program, followed by two years of specialized geriatrics residency training. This pathway leads to certification, and possibly fellowship after several years of supplementary academic training, by the Royal College of Physicians and Surgeons of Canada.
2. Doctors of Medicine (M.D.) can opt for a two-year residency program in family medicine and complete a one-year enhanced skills program in care of the elderly. This post-doctoral pathway is accredited by the College of Family Physicians of Canada.

Many universities across Canada also offer gerontology training programs for the general public, such that nurses and other health care professionals can pursue further education in the discipline in order to better understand the process of aging and their role in the presence of older patients and residents.

=== India ===
In India, Geriatrics is a relatively new speciality offering. A three-year post graduate residency (M.D) training can be joined for after completing the 5.5-year undergraduate training of MBBS (Bachelor of Medicine and Bachelor of Surgery). Unfortunately, only eight major institutes provide M.D in Geriatric Medicine and subsequent training. Training in some institutes are exclusive in the Department of Geriatric Medicine, with rotations in Internal medicine, medical subspecialties etc. but in certain institutions, are limited to 2-year training in Internal medicine and subspecialities followed by one year of exclusive training in Geriatric Medicine.

== Minimum geriatric competencies ==
In July 2007, the Association of American Medical Colleges (AAMC) and the John A. Hartford Foundation hosted a National Consensus Conference on Competencies in Geriatric Education where a consensus was reached on minimum competencies (learning outcomes) that graduating medical students needed to assure competent care by new interns to older patients. Twenty-six (26) Minimum Geriatric Competencies in eight content domains were endorsed by the American Geriatrics Society (AGS), the American Medical Association (AMA), and the Association of Directors of Geriatric Academic Programs (ADGAP). The domains are: cognitive and behavioral disorders; medication management; self-care capacity; falls, balance, gait disorders; atypical presentation of disease; palliative care; hospital care for elders, and health care planning and promotion. Each content domain specifies three or more observable, measurable competencies.

== Research ==
Changes in physiology with aging may alter the absorption, the effectiveness and the side effect profile of many drugs. These changes may occur in oral protective reflexes (dryness of the mouth caused by diminished salivary glands), in the gastrointestinal system (such as with delayed emptying of solids and liquids possibly restricting speed of absorption), and in the distribution of drugs with changes in body fat and muscle and drug elimination.

Psychological considerations include the fact that elderly persons (in particular, those experiencing substantial memory loss or other types of cognitive impairment) are unlikely to be able to adequately monitor and adhere to their own scheduled pharmacological administration. One study (Hutchinson et al., 2006) found that 25% of participants studied admitted to skipping doses or cutting them in half. Self-reported noncompliance with adherence to a medication schedule was reported by a striking one-third of the participants. Further development of methods that might possibly help monitor and regulate dosage administration and scheduling is an area that deserves attention.

Another important area is the potential for improper administration and use of potentially inappropriate medications, and the possibility of errors that could result in dangerous drug interactions. Polypharmacy is often a predictive factor. Research done on home/community health care found that "nearly 1 of 3 medical regimens contain a potential medication error".

== Ethical and medico-legal issues ==
Elderly persons sometimes cannot make decisions for themselves. They may have previously prepared a power of attorney and advance directives to provide guidance if they are unable to understand what is happening to them, whether this is due to long-term dementia or to a short-term, correctable problem, such as delirium from a fever.

Geriatricians must respect the patients' privacy while seeing that they receive appropriate and necessary services. More than most specialties, they must consider whether the patient has the legal responsibility and competence to understand the facts and make decisions. They must support informed consent and resist the temptation to manipulate the patient by withholding information, such as the dismal prognosis for a condition or the likelihood of recovering from surgery at home.

Elder abuse is the physical, financial, emotional, sexual, or other type of abuse of an older dependent. Adequate training, services, and support can reduce the likelihood of elder abuse, and proper attention can often identify it. For elderly people who are unable to care for themselves, geriatricians may recommend legal guardianship or conservatorship to care for the person or the estate.

Elder abuse occurs increasingly when caregivers of elderly relatives have a mental illness. These instances of abuse can be prevented by engaging these individuals with mental illness in mental health treatment. Additionally, interventions aimed at decreasing elder reliance on relatives may help decrease conflict and abuse. Family education and support programs conducted by mental health professionals may also be beneficial for elderly patients to learn how to set limits with relatives with psychiatric disorders without causing conflict that leads to abuse.

== See also ==
- Aging in Place
- Aging-associated diseases
- Alliance for Aging Research
- Commission for Certification in Geriatric Pharmacy
- Elderly care
- Gero-Informatics
- Nosokinetics
- Life extension
- Geriatric medicine in Egypt
- Transgenerational design
- Physical & Occupational Therapy in Geriatrics (journal)
- Gerontological nursing
- Geriatric Dentistry
- Activist Ageing
