= Sandy Anderson =

Sandy Anderson may refer to:

- Sandy Anderson (curler), Scottish curler
- Sandy Anderson (footballer) (1930–2016), Scottish footballer
- Alexander R. A. Anderson, nicknamed Sandy, Scottish mathematical biologist and cancer researcher
- Alexander Vass Anderson (1895–1963), nicknamed Sandy, British army officer
- Inferno (DC Comics), alter ego Sandy Anderson, a superheroine of the DC Comics universe

== See also ==
- Alexander Anderson (disambiguation)
