= Alexander Anderson =

Alexander Anderson may refer to:

== Arts and entertainment ==
- Alexander Anderson (cartoonist) (1920–2010), American cartoonist, creator of "Rocky the Flying Squirrel"
- Alexander Anderson (illustrator) (1775–1870), American illustrator
- Alexander Anderson (poet) (1845–1909), Scottish poet
- Alexander Anderson (Hellsing), fictional manga character

== Politics and law ==
- Alexander Anderson (Australian politician) (1811–1862), Australian politician and hotelier
- Alexander Anderson (provost) (1802–1887), Scottish advocate and politician who was Lord Provost of Aberdeen
- Alexander Anderson (Scottish politician) (1888–1954), Scottish politician, MP for Motherwell
- Alexander James Anderson (1863–1946), Canadian politician, barrister, and lawyer
- Alexander O. Anderson (1794–1869), American politician, U.S. senator from Tennessee

== Science and medicine ==
- Alexander Anderson (botanist) (1748–1811), Scottish surgeon and botanist
- Alexander Anderson (mathematician) (c. 1580–1620), Scottish mathematician
- Alexander Anderson (physicist) (1858–1936), Irish physicist and university president
- Alexander P. Anderson (1862–1943), American physiologist, botanist, and breakfast cereal inventor
- Alexander R. A. Anderson, Scottish mathematical biologist and cancer researcher

== Others ==
- Alexander Anderson (footballer) (fl. 1931–1934), Scottish footballer
- Sandy Anderson (footballer) (1930–2016), Scottish footballer
- Alexander Anderson (minister) (1676–1737), Scottish minister, moderator of the General Assembly of the Church of Scotland
- Alexander Anderson (Royal Marines officer) (1807–1877), British army general
- Alexander Anderson (rugby union) (1873–1939), Scotland rugby football player
- Alexander Anderson (slave trader) (fl. 1799), British slave trader
- Alexander Caulfield Anderson (1814–1884), Canadian explorer and fur trader
- Alexander Vass Anderson (1895–1963), British army officer

== See also ==
- Alex Anderson (disambiguation)
- Alexander Andersson (disambiguation)
- Al Anderson (disambiguation)
- Sandy Anderson (disambiguation)
- Ally Anderson (Alexandra Anderson, born 1996), Australian rules footballer
- Alexandria Anderson (born 1987), American track and field sprinter
- Robert Alexander Anderson (composer) (1894–1995), American composer
- Alexanderson, surname
