= C6H11NO2S =

The molecular formula C_{6}H_{11}NO_{2}S (molar mass: 161.22 g/mol) may refer to:

- S-Allylcysteine
- S-1-Propenyl-L-cysteine
