= Thai frailty index =

Frailty index in Thailand

The Thai frailty index is the index commonly used to measure frailty in Thailand. It consists of 30 variables, including hypertension; diabetes; stroke; chronic obstructive pulmonary disease; chronic kidney disease, cognitive impairment; falls; dental problems; hearing problems; underweight; urinary or fecal incontinence; poor quality of life; depressed mood; fatigue; sleep problems, needing help for bathing; dressing, eating; walking; toileting; drug management; and doing housework. The index ranges from 0 to 30, 30 being the highest level of frailty. The index can be used to predict all-cause mortality.

== Background ==
Frailty is a clinical state of increased vulnerability and the decline of organ systems due to the aging processes and external factors. It is related to morbidity and mortality.

There are many criteria using to detect frailty, such as the frailty phenotype, frailty index, or clinical frailty scale.

The frailty index is a common diagnostic tool for frailty. It counts deficits in both physical and mental health. The exact deficits, signs, and symptoms of frailty differ from country to country and from setting to setting.

== See also ==
- Frailty index
