= Alexander Andersson =

Alexander Andersson may refer to:

- Alexander Andersson (footballer, born 1985), Swedish football forward
- Alexander Andersson (footballer, born 2010), Swedish football midfielder

== See also ==
- Alexander Anderson (disambiguation)
