= Geriatric oncology =

Branch of medicine

Geriatric oncology is a branch of medicine that is concerned with the diagnosis and treatment of cancer in the elderly, usually defined as aged 65 and older. This fairly young but increasingly important subspecialty incorporates the special needs of the elderly into the treatment of cancer.

This subfield of oncological research has expanded recently as a large proportion of the population of developed countries are aging. In the United States, 20% of the population will be older than 65 years of age by the year 2030. Those 85 years and older will be the most rapidly growing group. This is compounded by the fact that the majority of cancer patients will be in this age group. Age in itself is one of the most important risk factors for developing cancer. Currently, 60% of newly diagnosed malignant tumors and 70% of cancer deaths occur in people aged 65 years or older. Many cancers are linked to aging; these include breast, colorectal, prostate, pancreatic, lung, bladder and stomach cancers.

== Origins ==
Rosemary Yancik first organized a symposium on geriatric oncology sponsored by the National Cancer Institute and the National Institute on Aging. A 1988 ASCO Presidential Address published in the Journal of Clinical Oncology by Dr. B.J. Kennedy encouraged the study of aging and cancer.

The American Society of Clinical Oncology (ASCO) has played a vital role in promoting the field of geriatric oncology in the United States. B.J. Kennedy, MD was one of the fathers of this field. In the late 1980s, the ASCO Annual Meetings started including educational sessions and presentations pertaining to this field. The Journal of Clinical Oncology started publishing more articles pertaining to geriatric oncology. ASCO has also funded training for oncology fellows.

One of a handful of people around the world who created the field of geriatric oncology during the 1980s was Lodovico Balducci. He was co-editor of the first major medial textbook on the subject, Geriatric Oncology, published in 1982, and has been honored with the B.J. Kennedy Award for Scientific Excellence in Geriatric Oncology from the American Society of Clinical Oncology.

== Unique concerns of older cancer patients ==
There are many age-related concerns older adults may have when compared to their younger counterparts. For instance, they:

- May have a lower threshold of tolerance for certain treatments.
- Have a decreased ability to feel the effects of disease or treatments.
- May experience comorbidities related to age besides cancer.
- May have functional problems, like being able to sustain themselves through activities like dressing, bathing, or eating or more strenuous activities like driving, shopping for themselves, or dealing with finances.
- May not be able to afford or have access to transportation, social support, or financial resources.
- May have different social determinants mediating end-of-life decision making.

Clinical trials usually exclude the elderly, and therefore, guidelines for treatment of cancer were mainly based on the younger population. A lot of research in this area is needed. For lung cancer specific research has been conducted. For geriatric lung cancer patients the IPSOS trial and a related Cochrane showed that older and frail patients require a specific treatment different than other patients.

Just as a child would see a pediatrician for medical care, an older patient should go to a geriatrician. An older patient with cancer will benefit from the expertise of a geriatric oncologist. Older patients have unique needs because of their often complex medical histories, numerous drugs they are taking, their social situations, possible problems with cognitive dysfunction related to age, and general diminution of organ function that occurs naturally in the older population. For these reasons, it is important that older patients (especially if frail, or have multiple medical problems) being considered for cancer treatment should undergo comprehensive geriatric assessment, to take all these factors into account.

== Psychosocial factors for older adults with cancer ==
Older adults in the cancer care setting are often neglected from being prescribed mental health aid. This is especially dangerous, as symptoms of anxiety and depression in older adults with cancer directly contribute to decreased quality of life, and when left unchecked contribute to why this population has one of the highest suicide rates. Although many factors attributed to aging like fatigue can mimic symptoms of being depressed, depression is not a normal part of aging. These existing comorbidities may make depression identification more difficult, as although symptoms like lower energy or appetite, concentration issues, or sleep disturbances may be caused by these comorbidities, they also are markers of depression.

Over 40% of older adults with cancer can experience distress along a continuum from sadness to anxiety and social isolation. Many of these individuals are pushed away from receiving psychological treatment due to existing stigmas exhibited by family members and caregivers alike, that handling additional appointments that come with mental support may be too taxing. Family caregivers of older adults with cancer are often tasked with managing their loved one's financial resources, treatment administration in the home, and physically taking them to their appointments. Although psychological aid appointments may seem additional, managing psychosocial symptoms may contribute to increased survival of cancer. Studies have found that patients with minimal anxiety symptoms have longer survivorship than those with subclinical or clinical levels of anxiety.

== Assessment ==
Typically, new patients meet with either a geriatric oncologist (or sometimes a medical oncologist and geriatrician separately), a psychosocial professional, and a nutritionist, all of whom work together to provide a comprehensive geriatric assessment of the patient's fitness to withstand the therapy necessary to treat his or her cancer. A number of validated screening tools are recommended have been identified to aid this process. Following the initial assessment, the team meets to evaluate the patient's fitness for therapy. The team's decisions and recommendations are then presented to the patient and his or her family as well as to the patient's primary physician when appropriate. After these discussions, and ideally with shared decision-making, treatment for the patient's cancer is decided on and initiated.

== Training and education programs ==
Training programs specifically in the geriatric oncology subspeciality have been established. In the United States, the ASCO Geriatric Oncology Fellowship program was developed with funding from the John A. Hartford Foundation. The American Board of Internal Medicine approved a 3-year combined fellowship training program in medical oncology and geriatrics. Graduates of this program will be eligible to be board certified in both specialties. Some fellows opt to also obtain additional training and certification in hematology as well. 10 institutions were identified and a curriculum was designed and instituted.

Examples of Recipients of the ASCO-Hartford Foundation Geriatrics/Oncology Training Program Development Grant
Boston University Medical Center
Duke University Medical Center
Johns Hopkins University
Northwestern University
University of Chicago
University of Colorado
University of Michigan
University of Rochester

Internationally, a diploma in geriatric oncology has now been established in France.

The first textbook in the field, Geriatric Oncology, was published by Lodovico Balducci et al. There are now many others.

== Organization and societies ==
The Geriatric Oncology Consortium is a non-profit organization dedicated to addressing the age based disparities in research, education and treatment in the older adult cancer population. It is leader in developing and conducting research in older adults and providing older adult cancer education to medical professionals, patients, caregivers and the general public.

The American Society of Clinical Oncology (ASCO) has started a geriatric oncology subspeciality. A webpage dedicated to article and resources about geriatric oncology is available.

The World oncology network has established a directory for geriatric oncology to promote this subspeciality.

The International Society of Geriatric Oncology or Société Internationale d'Oncologie Gériatrique in French, hence the acronym SIOG, was founded in 2000 and was officially registered as a Not-for-profit organisation under the Swiss law in October 2012. SIOG is a multidisciplinary society, including physicians in the fields of oncology and geriatrics, and allied health professionals and has over 1000 members in more than 40 countries around the world. The major risk factor for cancer is age, and with the aging of the world population, a major epidemiologic challenge is before us.

The goal of SIOG is to foster the development of health professionals in the field of geriatric oncology, in order to optimize treatment of older adults with cancer. SIOG promotes efforts in 3 strategic directions:

1. Education

- Disseminate knowledge in order to maintain a high common standard of healthcare in older cancer patients
- Integrate geriatric oncology in the curricula for medical and nursing education to ensure a high standard of qualification for healthcare professionals
- Address the shortage of specialist oncologists/geriatricians & allied health staff in geriatric oncology
- Increase public awareness of the worldwide cancer in the elderly epidemic

2. Clinical practice

- Integrate geriatric evaluation (including co morbidities) into oncology decision-making and guidelines
- Improve the quality of prevention, diagnosis, treatment, and follow-up of older patients with malignancies
- Address issues of access to care, including the needs of the caregiver
- Develop interdisciplinary geriatric oncology clinics

3. Research

- Develop, test and disseminate easy screening tools
- Create a clear and operational definition of vulnerability/frailty applicable to oncology
- Increase the relevance of clinical trials for older patients
- Improve research in the field of geriatric oncology
- Promote multidisciplinary, basic/translational research on the interface of aging and cancer
