= Frailty syndrome =

Weakness in elderly person

- Other names: Frailty
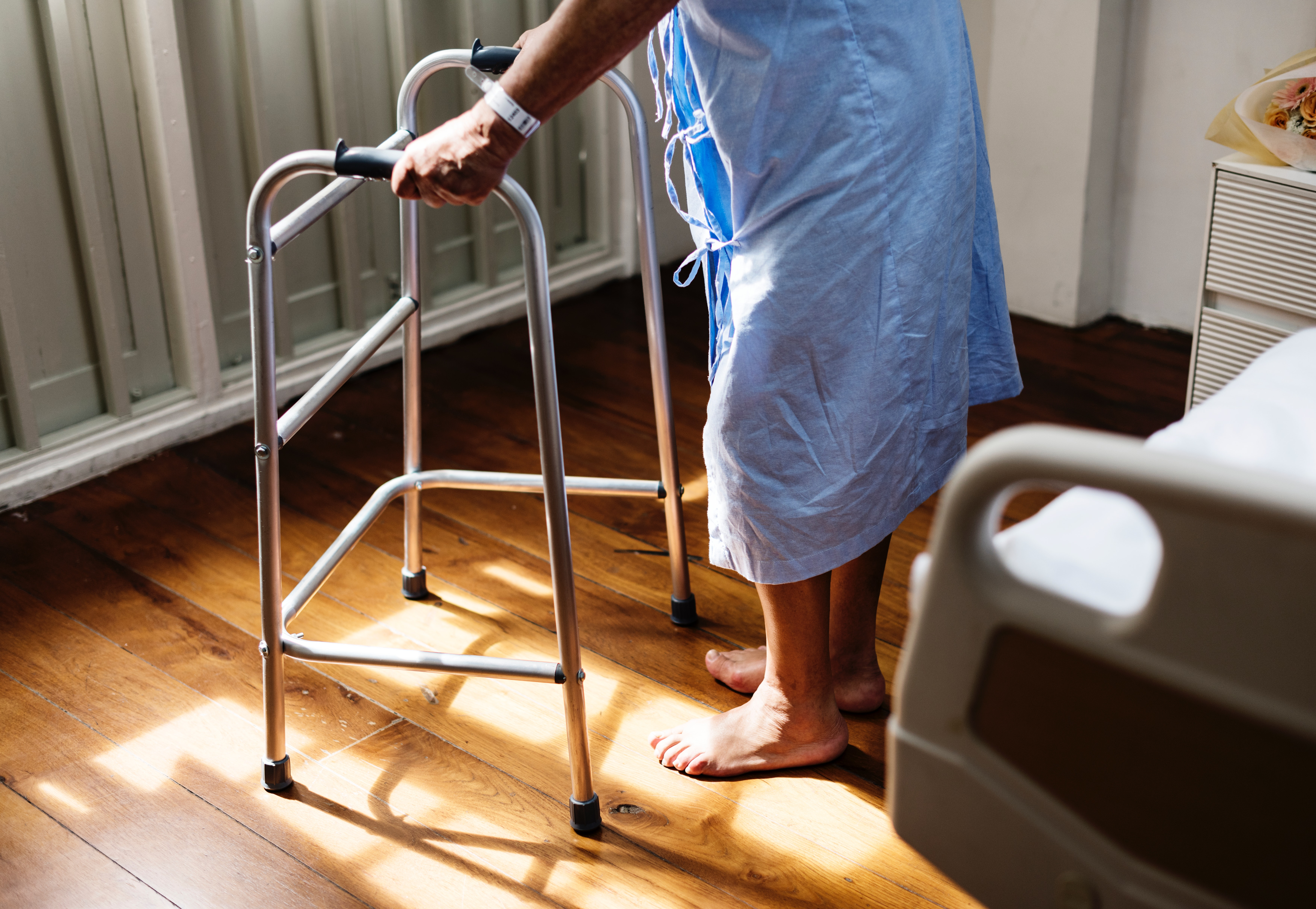
- A woman supporting herself with a walking frame.
- Specialty: Geriatrics

Frailty or frailty syndrome refers to a state of health in which older adults gradually lose their bodies' in-built reserves and functioning. This makes them more vulnerable, less able to recover and even apparently minor events (infections, environmental changes) can have drastic impacts on their physical and mental health.

Frailty can have various symptoms including muscle weakness (reduced grip strength), slower walking speed, exhaustion, unintentional weight loss, and frequent falls. Older people with certain medical conditions such as diabetes, heart disease and dementia, are also more likely to have frailty. In addition, adults living with frailty face more symptoms of anxiety and depression than those who do not.

Frailty is not an inevitable part of aging. Its development can be prevented or delayed, and its progress slowed. The most effective ways of preventing or improving frailty are regular physical activity and a healthy diet.

The prevalence of frailty varies based on countries and the assessment technique but it is estimated to range from 12% to 24% in people over 50. Malnutrition in older adults is very common and is an important contributor to frailty.

== Definitions ==
Frailty refers to an age-related functional decline and heightened state of vulnerability. It is a worsening of functional status compared to the normal physiological process of aging. It can refer to the combination of a decline of physical and physiological aspects of a human body. The reduced reserve capacity of organ systems, muscle, and bone create a state where the body is not capable of coping with stressors such as illness or falls. Frailty can lead to increased risk of adverse side effects, complications, and mortality.

Older age by itself is not what defines frailty, it is however a syndrome found in older adults. Many adults over 65 are not living with frailty. Frailty is not one specific disease, however is a combination of many factors. Frailty does not have a specific universal criteria on which it is diagnosed; there are a combination of signs and symptoms that can lead to a diagnosis of frailty. Evaluations can be done on physical status, weight fluctuations, or subjective symptoms. Frailty most commonly refers to physical status and is not a syndrome of mental capacity such as dementia, which is a decline in cognitive function. Although, frailty can be a risk factor for the development of dementia.

Although no universal diagnostic criteria exist, some clinical screening tools are commonly used to identify frailty. These include the Fried Frailty Phenotype and a deficit accumulation frailty index. The Fried Frailty Phenotype assesses five domains commonly affected by frailty: exhaustion, weakness, slowness, physical inactivity, and weight loss. The presence of 1-2 findings is classified as "pre-frailty", 3 or more as frailty and the presence of all 5 indicates "end-stage frailty" and is associated with poor prognosis. The deficit accumulation characterization of frailty tallies deficits present in a variety of clinical areas (including nutritional deficiency, laboratory abnormalities, disability index, cognitive and physical impairment) to create a frailty index. A higher number of deficits is associated with a worse prognosis.

== Signs and symptoms ==
Frailty is a complex condition that is a result of multiple body systems experiencing decline in function, and the more body systems that are affected, the higher the risk is for developing frailty. There is a variety of risk factors and signs that can suggest an older person having frailty. However, the development of any of these risk factors or signs alone does not establish frailty as they can be symptoms of numerous other health conditions. For establishing that a person has frailty multiple factors or signs need to be present at the same time.

Most often frailty is identified by having three out of five of the following symptoms: unintentional weight loss, muscle weakness, self-reported exhaustion, slowness and low physical activity. At the same time there are many other risk factors, signs and symptoms can be part of frailty. The presence of some factors are thought to increase the likelihood of having or developing frailty more than others. In general, risk factors, signs and symptoms can be biological, psychological, and social.

=== Health-related ===
Decreases in skeletal muscle mass (sarcopenia) and bone density (osteopenia and osteoporosis) are two major contributors to developing frailty in older adults. In early to middle age, bone density and muscle mass are closely related. As adults age, skeletal muscle mass or bone density may begin to decline. This decline can lead to frailty and both have been identified as contributors to disability.

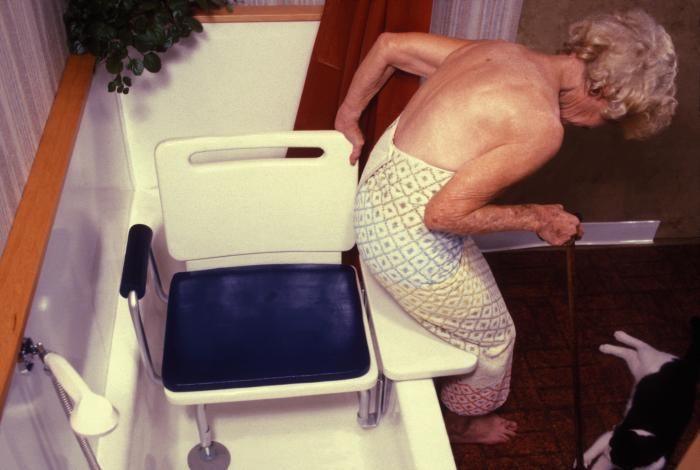
Muscle weakness makes it difficult to perform everyday activities, like getting into a bathtub.

Sarcopenia is the degenerative loss of skeletal muscle mass, quality, and strength associated with aging. The rate of muscle loss is dependent on exercise level, co-existing health conditions, nutrition and other factors. Sarcopenia can lead to reduction in functional status and cause significant disability from increased muscle weakness. Aging, lower levels of DHEA, testosterone, IGF-1 and increased levels of cortisol are thought to contribute to muscle wasting in those with frailty.

Osteopenia and osteoporosis are diseases of bone mineral density loss (usually age related) that lead to an increased risk of bone fractures, especially with falls. Frailty is associated with an increased risk of osteoporosis related bone fractures.

Frailty is also common in those with heart failure. Both frailty and heart failure share similar methods of progressive health decline and often lead to worsened health conditions when combined.

There are many other health-related factors that can be present in frailty including incontinence, lung disease, having multiple long-term health conditions, taking multiple medications regularly, malnutrition, cognitive impairment, diabetes, and obesity. Poor oral health, difficulties with chewing and swallowing, dry mouth and pain in the mouth are also signs of frailty in some people.

Conditions and symptoms related to mental health that can increase the likelihood of frailty include depression and loneliness.

=== Lifestyle ===
Lifestyle factors and behaviors that increase the likelihood of having or developing frailty include smoking, sedentary lifestyle, low level of physical exercise. Dietary factors include low intake of certain vitamins (D, E, C, folate, carotenoids, α-tocopherol) and having a higher score on the Dietary Inflammatory Index.

=== Demographic characteristics ===
People in certain demographic groups have a higher risk of frailty than others either due to direct or indirect reasons. Demographic factors include older age, being female, having lower level of education, and having low income.

=== Social ===
Certain factors in social background and situation, interpersonal relationships can also be risk factors for frailty. Such factors include living alone, being single or widowed, having lower family income or having suffered abuse.

Living in poor neighborhood conditions, in a rural area, and having low social support are also potential risk factors for frailty.

== Mechanism ==
The causes of frailty are multifactorial involving dysregulation across many physiological systems. Frailty may be related to a proinflammatory state. A common interleukin elevated in this state is IL-6. A pro-inflammatory cytokine, IL-6 was found to be common in older adults with frailty. IL-6 is typically up-regulated by inflammatory mediators, such as C-reactive protein, released in the presence of chronic disease. Increased levels of inflammatory mediators are often associated with chronic disease; however, they may also be elevated even in the absence of chronic disease.

Sarcopenia, anemia, anabolic hormone deficiencies, and excess exposure to catabolic hormones such as cortisol have been associated with an increased likelihood of frailty. Other mechanisms associated with frailty include insulin resistance, increased glucose levels, compromised immune function, micronutrient deficiencies, and oxidative stress.

Mitochondrial dysfunction, including mitochondrial DNA mutations, cellular respiration dysfunction, and changes in mitochondrial hemostasis is thought to contribute to reduced cellular energy, production of reactive oxygen species and inflammation. This mitochondrial dysfunction is thought to contribute to the signs of frailty.

Researchers found that individual abnormal body functions may not be the best predictor of risk of frailty. However, they did conclude that once the number of conditions reaches a certain threshold, the risk of frailty increases. This finding suggests that treatment of frailty syndrome should not be focused on a single condition, but a multitude in order to increase the likelihood of better treatment results.

=== Theoretical understanding ===
Declines in physiologic reserves and resilience contribute to frailty. The risk of frailty increases with age and with the incidence of diseases. The development of frailty is also thought to involve declines in energy production, energy utilization and repair systems in the body, resulting in declines in the function of many different physiological systems. This decline in multiple systems affects the normal complex adaptive behavior that is essential to health and eventually results in frailty.

A comparison of peripheral blood mononuclear cells from frail older individuals to cells from healthy younger individuals showed evidence in the frail older individuals of increased oxidative stress, increased apurinic/pyrimidinic sites in DNA, increased accumulation of endogenous DNA damage and reduced ability to repair DNA double-strand breaks.

== Diagnosis ==
Frailty is hypothesized to reflect impairments in the regulation of multiple physiologic systems, embodying a lack of resilience to physiologic challenges and thus elevated risk for a range of deleterious endpoints. Generally speaking, the empirical assessment of frailty in individuals seeks ultimately to capture this or related features, though distinct approaches to such assessment have been developed in the literature.

Two most widely used approaches, different in their nature and scopes, are the physical frailty phenotype and frailty index/deficit accumulation model.

=== Physical frailty phenotype ===
A popular approach to the assessment of frailty encompasses the assessment of five dimensions that are hypothesized to reflect systems whose impaired regulation underlies the syndrome. The five dimensions are:

- unintentional weight loss
- exhaustion
- muscle weakness
- slowness while walking
- low levels of activity

These dimensions form specific criteria indicating adverse functioning, which are implemented using a combination of self-reported and performance-based measures. Those who meet at least three of the criteria are defined as "frail", while those not matching any of the five criteria are defined as "robust".

=== Frailty index/deficit accumulation ===
The frailty index is another common approach to the assessment of frailty in which the syndrome is viewed in terms of the number of health "deficits" that are manifest in the individual, leading to a continuous measure of frailty. This score is based the presence of deficits in may areas related to frailty, including symptoms of cognitive or physical impairment, laboratory abnormalities, nutritional deficits, or disability.

=== Comprehensive geriatric assessment ===
Comprehensive geriatric assessment (CGA) is a method to assess frailty typically in a healthcare environment. CGA looks at multiple domains of potential risk factors including physical, psychological, and social health.

CGAs for older people with frailty who do not live in a long-term care institution could improve medication adherence, patient functioning, quality of care, and reduce the risk of unplanned hospital admissions. At the same time CGA for this demographic seems to have no impact on death or nursing home admissions.

Older people with moderate or severe frailty who are admitted to a hospital due to an unexpected emergency have an increased risk of a prolonged length of stay, death, and being discharged to a place other than their home. However, those who undergo a comprehensive geriatric assessment on admission are more likely to survive and be discharged to their homes.

In the United Kingdom, best practice guidelines recommend a medical review based on CGA to establish the management plan for people with frailty.

=== Four domains of frailty ===
A model consisting of four domains of frailty uses a conceptualisation that could be viewed as blending the phenotypic and index models. The model was developed from routinely collected hospital data, and was found to have even predictive capability across 3 outcomes of care. In the care home setting, one study indicated that not all four domains of frailty were routinely assessed in residents, giving evidence to suggest that frailty may still primarily be viewed only in terms of physical health.

=== SHARE Frailty Index ===
The SHARE-Frailty Index (SHARE-FI) assesses frailty based on five domains of the frailty phenotype:

- Fatigue
- Loss of appetite
- Grip strength
- Functional difficulties
- Physical activity

=== Clinical Frailty Scale ===
The Clinical Frailty Scale (CFS) is a scale used to assess frailty which was evolved from the Canadian Study of Health and Aging. It is among the few assessment tools that have demonstrated adaptability for remote use. The CFS is a 9-point scale used to assess a persons frailty level, where a score of 1 point would mean a person is very fit and robust, to a score of 9 points meaning the person is severely frail and terminally ill.

=== Edmonton Frail Scale ===
The Edmonton Frail Scale (EFS) is another method used to screen frailty. This scale is given scores of up to 17 points. It has been assessed to screen all domains of frailty, and is said to be easy to perform by clinicians. Specific tests used in this scaling system are walking tests and clock drawing.

=== Electronic Frail Scale (eFI) ===
The electronic Frail Scale (eFI) is a scale weighted out of 36 deficit points where the higher the number in the score will represent the more frail, or more prone to frailty. Each frailty-related deficit the person has is given a point and the more deficits the person is experiencing the more likely they are frail or will experience frailty in the future. The total number of deficits is divided by 36. Then, a frailty category is assigned. A person with a score of 0.00–0.12 is in the "Fit" category. A person with a score of 0.13–0.24 is in the "Mild" category. A person with a score of 0.25–0.36 is in the "Moderate" category. Finally, a person with the score of 0.36 or above is considered to be in the "Severe" category.

=== Hospital Frailty Risk Score (HFRS) ===
The Hospital Frailty Risk Score (HFRS) uses diagnostic codes from the International Classification of Diseases, tenth revision (ICD10). It is calculated by combining a weighted set of 109 ICD10 diagnostic codes recorded in the person's medical record during the current hospital admission and the two previous emergency admissions occurring in the prior two years. Each of the 109 ICD10 codes has an associated weight, from 0.1 up to 7.1. These weights are summed to give the frailty risk score for each person. The resulting HFRS values ranging from 0 (zero frailty risk) for those with none of the 109 codes to 173.2 for someone with all 109 codes. People can be categorised into four groups: zero risk (HRFS=0), lower risk (0<HFRS<5), intermediate risk (5≤HFRS≤15) or high risk (HRFS> 15). Originally the HFRS was developed for people aged 75 years or older but it can be used to identify frailty risk for all adults admitted to hospital.

=== Assessment for surgical outcomes ===
Frail elderly people are at significant risk of post-surgical complications and the need for extended care. Frailty more than doubles the risk of morbidity and mortality from surgery and cardiovascular conditions. Assessment of older patients before elective surgeries can accurately predict the patients' recovery trajectories. One frailty scale consists of five items:

- unintentional weight loss >4.5 kg in the past year
- self-reported exhaustion
- <20th population percentile for grip strength
- slowed walking speed, defined as lowest population quartile on 4-minute walking test
- low physical activity such that persons would only rarely undertake a short walk

A healthy person scores 0; a very frail person scores 5. Compared to non-frail elderly people, people with intermediate frailty scores (2 or 3) are twice as likely to have post-surgical complications, spend 50% more time in the hospital, and are three times as likely to be discharged to a skilled nursing facility instead of to their own homes. Frail elderly patients (score of 4 or 5) have even worse outcomes, with the risk of being discharged to a nursing home rising to twenty times the rate for non-frail elderly people.

Another tool that has been used to predict frailty outcome post-surgery is the Modified Frailty Index, or mFI-5. This scale consists of 5 key co-morbidities:

- Congestive heart failure within 1 month of surgery
- Diabetes mellitus
- Chronic Obstruction Pulmonary Disease or pneumonia in the past
- Individuals needing additional assistance to perform everyday activities of living
- High blood pressure that is controlled with medication

An individual without one of these conditions would be given a score of 0 for the condition absent. An individual who does have one of the conditions would be given a score of 1 for each of the conditions present. In an initial study using the mFI-5 scale, individuals with a sum mFI-5 score of 2 or greater were predicted to experience post-surgery complications due to frailty, which was supported by the results of the study.

Frailty scales can be used to predict the risk of complications in patients before and after surgery. There is an association between frailty and delayed transplant function after a kidney transplant. Other studies note that frailty scales alone may be inaccurate in predicting outcomes for people undergoing surgical procedures, and other factors such as co-morbid medical conditions need to be considered.

For people with frailty undergoing abdominal surgery, prehabilitation programmes that include exercise, improved diet and psychological support can reduce the length of hospital stay and decrease the risk of serious complications.

== Prevention ==
Frailty is not an inevitable part of aging, and its development (or worsening) can be prevented or delayed.

When considering prevention of frailty, it is important to understand the individual's risk factors that contribute to frailty and identify them early on. Some of these risk factors can be changed or controlled (for example an unhealthy diet), so early identification of such risk factors allows for preventative actions, reducing risks of future complications.

=== Exercise ===
Physical activity is a significant part of the prevention of frailty. As people age, physical activity markedly drops, with the steepest declines seen in adolescence and continuing on throughout life. Lower levels of physical activity are a key component of developing frailty. Therefore, regular exercise such as walking, strength training, and self-directed physical activity is an important way to prevent frailty.

=== Nutrition ===
Having a healthy diet and balanced nutrition also plays a major role in preventing frailty. A healthy dietary pattern consisting of high consumption of healthy fats, fruits, vegetables, low-fat dairy products, and whole grains can contribute to maintaining a healthy weight and prevent or postpone frailty.

Specifically, an adherence to the Mediterranean diet may help decreasing the risk of frailty. A higher protein intake and a higher intake of certain vitamins (B6, C, D, α-carotene, β-carotene, α-tocopherol, and folate) might also support prevention.

Taking part in dietary counseling, dietary education, or cooking classes can also help older people to prevent frailty.

=== Social factors ===
Some social risk factors commonly seen in people with frailty can also be improved. Physical activity may help to improve social functioning besides its health benefits. Receiving training in how to use the computer and the internet, using the internet to communicate with other people (for example through a videocall) can also help reduce loneliness and social isolation.

== Management ==
Through management and interventions, it is possible to decrease frailty or slow down its progress. Physical activity and nutritional supplementation are the most effective way of decreasing and managing frailty. There are currently no pharmacological interventions available for frailty.

As frailty comes with a heightened vulnerability to stress, avoiding known stressors (ie. surgeries, infections, etc.) and understanding mechanisms to reduce frailty can help older adults prevent worsening their frail status. Currently, preventative interventions focus on minimizing muscle loss and improvement of overall well-being in older adults or individuals with chronic illnesses.

=== Exercise ===
Physical activity is the most effective way of decreasing frailty and increasing the quality of life.

Individualized physical therapy programs developed by physicians can help improve frail status. For example, progressive resistance strength training for older adults can be used in clinical practice or at-home as a way to regain mobility. Mobility training can increase mobility level and functioning in older adults living in community-dwellings, such as a nursing home.

=== Nutritional supplementation ===
Nutritional supplementation (including protein supplementation) is another effective way of managing frailty. Frailty can involve changes such as weight loss and people might have difficulties with supplementation and diet. For those who may be undernourished and not acquiring adequate calories, oral nutritional supplements in between meals may decrease nutritional deficits. Nutritional supplementation is even more effective when coupled with regular physical activity.

Vitamin D, omega-3 fatty acid, sex hormone (such as testosterone) or growth hormone supplementation have not shown benefits in physical functioning, activities of daily living or frailty.

=== Occupational therapy ===
Occupational therapy might provide some improvements in elderly adults living at home or in community-dwellings, such as a nursing home. It can improve mobility, social participation, provide empowerment, and help with activities of daily living (brushing teeth, bathing, dressing up, etc.).

=== Medication review ===
It is common for people with frailty to regularly take 5 or more medications (polypharmacy). As a result this group is at a greater risk of adverse drug reactions that can contribute to falls and hospitalisation. People with frailty are also at risk of receiving potentially inappropriate prescribing. This can include being prescribed unnecessary medications (overprescribing), incorrect drug or dose (misprescribing), and not receiving beneficial medication (underprescribing). Medication review during meeting the GP or upon being admitted to hospital presents an effective way to optimise the appropriateness of medications.

=== Long-term care ===
Specific ways of frailty management largely depends on an individual's classification (i.e. pre-fail, frail) and treatment needs. Physicians need to work closely with people who have frailty to develop a realistic management plan to ensure their compliance, leading to better health outcomes.

Providing personalised care for local communities using the primary care medical home (PCMH) model could improve health-related quality of life, mental health, self-management, and reduce hospital admissions. Providing care at home (using the hospital at home model) might reduce admissions into residential care and result in the same or potentially reduced death rate compared to inpatient care in a hospital.

Advance care planning can effectively support hospitalised people with frailty to express what kind of healthcare they prefer to receive in the future. It can also improve the outcomes of future healthcare.

Palliative care may be helpful for individuals who are experiencing an advanced state of frailty with possible other co-existing health conditions. The goal of palliative care in people with frailty is improving quality of life by reducing pain and other harmful symptoms.

== Epidemiology ==
Frailty is a common geriatric syndrome. Due to the absence of international diagnostic criteria, the prevalence estimates may not be accurate. Estimates of frailty prevalence in older populations vary according to a number of factors, including the setting in which the prevalence is being estimated — e.g., nursing home (higher prevalence) vs. community (lower prevalence) — and the definition used for frailty. Using the widely used frailty phenotype framework, prevalence estimates of 7–16% have been reported in non-institutionalized, community-dwelling older adults. In a systemic review exploring the prevalence of frailty based on geographical location it was found that Africa and North and South America had the largest prevalence at 22% and 17% respectively. Europe had the lowest prevalence at 8%.

Frailty is more common in those with mental health conditions including anxiety disorders, bipolar disorder and depression. The presence of frailty with these mental disorders was also associated with a poor prognosis and increased mortality.

Research comparing case management trials to standard care for people living with frailty in high-income countries found that there was no difference in reducing cost or improving patient outcomes between the two approaches.

=== Sex and ethnicity differences in frailty ===
Frailty is more common in female older adults compared to male older adults. This difference is influenced by various biological, social, and environmental factors influence. Studies have found that the incidence of frailty was higher in females with more medical comorbidities. Frailty-related physical changes in muscle and blood also show sex-specific differences.

In a population based study, Non-Hispanic Black-Americans and Hispanic-Americans had a higher incidence of frailty compared to non-Hispanic White-Americans.

== Research directions ==
As of September 2021, ongoing clinical trials on frailty syndrome in the US include:

- the impact of frailty on clinical outcomes of patients treated for abdominal aortic aneurysms
- the use of "pre-habilitation," an exercise regimen used before transplant surgery, to prevent the frailty effects of kidney transplant in recipients
- defining the acute changes in frailty following sepsis in the abdomen
- the efficacy of the anti-inflammatory drug, Fisetin, in reducing frailty markers in elderly adults
- Physical Performance Testing and Frailty in Prediction of Early Postoperative Course After Cardiac Surgery (Cardiostep)

== See also ==
- Ageing
- Osteoporosis
- Sarcopenia
