= Physiological functional capacity =

Ability to do the physical tasks of daily life

Physiological functional capacity (PFC) is the ability to perform the physical tasks of daily life and the ease with which these tasks can be performed. PFC declines at some point with advancing age even in healthy adults, resulting in a reduced capacity to perform certain physical tasks. This can eventually result in increased incidence of functional disability, increased use of health care services, loss of independence, and reduced quality of life.

== See also ==
- Human body
- Frailty syndrome
- Frailty index
- Functional residual capacity, where it pertains to the lungs
- Physiology
