= Alec Anderson =

Alec Anderson may refer to:

- Alec Anderson (American football, born 1894) (1894–1953), American football player
- Alec Anderson (American football, born 1999), American football player

== See also ==
- Alex Anderson (disambiguation)
