= Monfardini =

Monfardini is an Italian surname. Notable people with the surname include:

- Ferdinando Monfardini (born 1984) Italian race car driver
- Silvio Monfardini (born 1938), Italian oncologist
- Wenling Tan Monfardini (born 1972) Chinese-born Italian table tennis player
