= Silvio Monfardini =

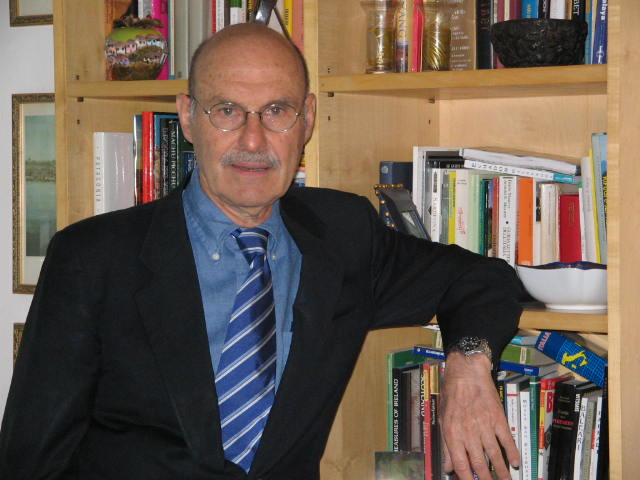
Silvio Monfardini

Silvio Monfardini (born 13 May 1939, Milan) is an Italian oncologist.

A pioneer in geriatric oncology in Europe and author of approximately 340 scientific publications, he participated in the initial studies that led to the clinical use of adriamycin, contributing, in his fifty-year career, both to the development of new combination chemotherapies for Hodgkin's disease and non-Hodgkin's lymphomas, and to the introduction of Multidimensional Geriatric Assessment in Europe, focusing his work on the treatment of neoplasm in older people.

== Life and career ==
After completing his classical studies, he graduated in medicine and surgery from the University of Milan in 1964, and subsequently specialised in endocrinology, oncology and haematology.

=== Professional and academic career ===
Monfardini's professional career began at the Fatebenefratelli Hospital in Milan, where he remained until 1968 when, after obtaining a scholarship at the National Cancer Institute in Milan, he was hired in the same place as an assistant in the medical oncology department headed by Gianni Bonadonna: his contribution to the development of the anti-tumour antibiotic adriamycin dates back to this period.

After a year of research on chronic myeloid leukaemia at the Division of Medical Oncology at Memorial Sloan-Kettering Cancer Centre in New York, he participated in several clinical trials at the National Cancer Institute in Milan, including one on the ABVD combination (comprising adriamycin, bleomycin, vinblastine and dacarbazine).

After serving as First Secretary of the Italian Association of Medical Oncology (AIOM) in 1974, he focused his research on testicular cancer, beginning to conduct studies on chemotherapy in elderly patients with non-Hodgkin's lymphoma, concentrating increasingly over the years on neoplasms in geriatric patients.

Thanks to his contribution to the field, he is considered one of the “pioneers” of oncology: over the years Monfardini founded and held senior positions in some of the most important medical associations in this field, both nationally and internationally. In 1975 he was one of the founders of the European Society for Medical Oncology, which he then chaired from 1984 to 1987. In 1985, he was appointed president of the Italian Association of Medical Oncology (AIOM), remaining in office until 1987. From 1996 to 1998, he was scientific director of the National Institute for the Study and Treatment of Tumours - Giovanni Pascale Foundation in Naples, where he participated in studies on the treatment of lung cancer in elderly patients with chemotherapy and took part in the coordination of the national study on the so-called Di Bella therapy, and in 2000 he was one of the founders of the International Society of Geriatric Oncology (SIOG), of which he was president from 2003 to 2004, the year in which he contributed to found the Italian Association for Tumours in the Elderly (AIOTE), whose Scientific Council he chaired until 2006. Tumours in geriatric patients have always been one of Monfardini's main fields of research: in 1990 he had involved various European and American oncologists in organising a consensus meeting on tumours in such patients, then from 1992 to 1994 he coordinated a study group on neoplasms in the elderly conducted by the EORTC, being a member of the board of directors of the organization. He subsequently conducted one of the first European studies on Multidimensional Geriatric Assessment in 1996.

Always active in dissemination and teaching, from 1976 to 1988 Monfardini led the International Union Against Cancer (UICC) programme of courses on anti-tumour chemotherapy, organising courses in various countries in Asia, Africa and South America, teaching specialisation academic courses in oncology at various Italian universities, including Federico II in Naples and the University of Padua: in Padua he also headed the medical oncology division of the local University Hospital and the Veneto Oncology Institute (from 1998 to 2007). Since 2020, Monfardini has been directing the Oncopedia programme of the European School of Oncology, continuing his teaching activities in advanced oncology courses held by the SIOG at various Italian universities, and publishing essays on the history and development of the discipline of oncology

== Acknowledgements ==
He was awarded the “Paul Calabresi” Memorial Lecture Award by the International Society of Geriatric Oncology (SIOG) in 2006.

In 2015, he received the “B.J. Kennedy” Award for “Scientific Excellence in Geriatric Oncology” from the American Society of Clinical Oncology (ASCO), while in 2018 he received a lifetime achievement award from the Italian Association of Medical Oncology (AIOM)

== Works ==
- Monfardini, S. (with Brunner, K., Crowther, D., Eckhardt, S., Olive, D., Tanneberger, S., Veronesi, A., Whitehouse, J. M. A., & Wittes, R.). (1987). Manual of Adult and Paediatric Medical Oncology. Springer Berlin / Heidelberg. ISBN 978-3-540-15347-4
- Fentiman, I. S., & Monfardini, S. (edited by). (1994). Cancer in the elderly: Treatment and research. Oxford Univ. Press. ISBN 978-0-19-262200-6
- Monfardini, S., & Gridelli, C. (1997). La chemioterapia nel paziente oncologico anziano: Problematiche, possibilità e prospettive. Il pensiero scientifico. ISBN 978-88-7002-779-2
- Minerva, D., & Monfardini, S. (2013). Il bagnino e i samurai. La ricerca biomedica in Italia: un'occasione sprecata. Codice edizioni. ISBN 978-88-7578-380-8
