= Alexanderson =

Alexanderson is a surname meaning "Son of Alexander".

== People with the surname ==
- Ernst Alexanderson (1878–1975), Swedish-American electrical engineer, pioneer in radio and television development
- Eva Alexanderson (1911–1994), Swedish writer and translator
- Gerald L. Alexanderson (born 1933), American mathematician
- Leroy J. Alexanderson (1910–2004), the last captain of the SS United States

== Fictional characters ==
- Lars Alexanderson, a character from the Tekken video game series

== See also ==
- Alex Anderson (disambiguation)
- Alexanderson alternator, generates high frequency alternating current up to 100 kHz
- Alexanderson Day, named after the Swedish radio engineer Ernst Fredrik Werner Alexanderson
- Alexandersson
- Alexander
- Alexanders
