= Undernutrition in older adults =

Syndrome of reduced energy intake or utilization in older adults

Malnutrition
- Specialty: Geriatrics
- Symptoms: low weight, muscle wasting, weakness
- Complications: physical debility, cognitive impairment, reduced quality of life, worse outcomes for chronic diseases
- Usual onset: Old age
- Causes: Reduced senses of taste and smell in aging, age-related anorexia
- Risk factors: poverty, loneliness, depression, grief, new environment or moving into a nursing home, alcohol dependence, dysphagia (swallowing difficulties), polypharmacy
- Differential diagnosis: Frailty, sarcopenia, cachexia
- Treatment: Oral nutritional supplements, nutrition counseling, tube feeding
- Frequency: 3-50%

Undernutrition in older adults (a type of malnutrition) is a syndrome that results in lower energy availability than that is required to meet the body's metabolic demands. Broadly, it can be categorized as inadequate caloric or protein intake, inadequate utilization of nutrients (due to malabsorption in the gut), or nutrient intake that cannot meet the body's increased metabolic demands (such as in cases of acute illness). Undernutrition is common in older adults due to a variety of etiologies, including body changes associated with aging.

Malnutrition is common in older adults. Using the Mini-Nutritional Assessment as a screening tool (which is widely utilized), the prevalence of malnutrition is 3% in community dwelling older adults, 22% in hospitalized older adults, and 30% for those in nursing homes or long-term care facilities. Using the Global Leadership Initiative on Malnutrition (GLIM) diagnostic criteria, 7-13% of older adults in community settings, and 50% who are hospitalized, have heart failure, cancer or are in nursing homes have malnutrition.

== Cause ==
Bodily changes of aging can lead to malnutrition, including reduced smell and taste with aging that may make food less platable. Age related anorexia (loss of appetite) is also thought to play a prominent role. Often there is not one single cause of malnutrition in older adults, but a combination of different causes.

Many medical problems are much more common in the elderly. Poor dental health, dry mouth, dental cavities, lack of teeth, poorly fitting dentures may all lead to malnutrition. Older adults are also much more likely to have swallowing difficulties (often due to dementia, Parkinson's disease or stroke), which can also contribute. Mobility limitations in the elderly or weakness in the hands or arms (common after strokes) may make it harder to cook food. Older adults with dementia may also not want to eat or forget to eat. Older adults also have a larger chronic disease burden than younger adults, with increased inflammation from chronic diseases and increased metabolic burdens causing malnutrition. In limited studies of older hospitalized adults, the level of inflammation was directly linked to the severity of malnutrition. Depression, loneliness, social isolation, alcohol dependence or misuse, and recent move into a nursing home are all associated with malnutrition as well. Many older adults also take many medications, with polypharmacy being a potential contributor to malnutrition as medications may cause reduced appetite, dry mouth, or gastrointestinal side effects. Poverty, not being able to afford food or having access to food is an important potential cause.

== Diagnosis ==
The GLIM framework, used as a diagnostic criteria, takes into account weight loss, low body mass index, low muscle mass, low intake of nutrients (or malabsorption or maldigestion) and inflammation to make the diagnosis of malnutrition. The Mini-Nutritional Assessment can be used as a screening tool. A comprehensive geriatric assessment, which looks at all aspects of a person's environment, medical conditions, psychosocial factors and support availability to develop a care plan will identify factors contributing to malnutrition. Historical biomarkers for malnutrition including protein levels (albumin and prealbumin) should not be used to diagnose malnutrition.

Malnutrition is closely related to frailty, sarcopenia and cachexia, other syndromes common in older adults and with similar signs, symptoms and complications.

Screening all hospitalized older adults for malnutrition is recommended. Malnutrition screening is also recommended at outpatient doctor's visits.

== Treatment ==
The target caloric intake is 30 kilocalories per kilogram of ideal body weight per day in older adults, with protein intake of 1.0 grams per kilogram ideal body weight per day. Nutritional counselling to assist patients get enough calories, proteins, vitamins and minerals should be individualized to a patient's needs and often involves a nutritionist or dietician. The comprehensive treatment approach should treat all secondary causes that may be leading to malnutrition. For example, a medication review can address polypharmacy and discontinue medications potentially contributing to malnutrition. A dentist can provide new dentures, treatment for cavities or address other oral concerns to optimize nutrition. Meals can also be delivered with social programs, such as Meals on Wheels.

Oral nutritional supplements (such as high calorie, fortified protein shakes) can be used when dietary counselling is not adequate to meet goals. Oral nutritional supplements are associated with improved outcomes in the treatment of malnutrition in older adults.

For those who continue to have inadequate nutrient intake after implementation of a nutritional care plan with counselling, caregiver support, addressing secondary causes of malnutrition, and adding oral supplements to the diet, tube feeding can be tried. This has not been well studied in malnutrition outside of the critical care hospital setting.

In elderly adults with malnutrition, individualized nutritional care to achieve calorie and protein intake targets was associated with a lower risk of death, intensive care unit hospital admission, and functional decline.
