= Alexander R. A. Anderson =

Scottish mathematical oncologist

Alexander R. A. "Sandy" Anderson is a Scottish mathematical biologist and cancer researcher known for contributions to mathematical oncology, particularly in the development of multiscale and hybrid modeling approaches to tumor growth, invasion, and treatment response.

Mathematical oncology—the application of mathematical and computational modeling to cancer—has emerged as an interdisciplinary field integrating biology, physics, and clinical oncology. Anderson has contributed to the development of integrative frameworks that combine mechanistic modeling with experimental and clinical data in cancer research.

He is Chair of the Department of Integrated Mathematical Oncology at the H. Lee Moffitt Cancer Center & Research Institute.

== Early life and education ==
Anderson studied mathematical biology at the University of Dundee, where he obtained his MSc and PhD.

== Academic career ==
Following research appointments in the United Kingdom, Anderson continued work in mathematical biology and cancer modeling. He joined the Moffitt Cancer Center in 2008, where he founded the Integrated Mathematical Oncology (IMO) program, an interdisciplinary initiative combining mathematics, biology, and clinical oncology.

He later became Chair of the Department of Integrated Mathematical Oncology and served as President of the Society for Mathematical Biology.

== Research ==
=== Mathematical oncology ===
Mathematical oncology applies quantitative and computational approaches to understand cancer development, progression, and treatment response. Mathematical models have been used to describe tumor growth, somatic evolution, metastasis, and therapeutic resistance across multiple spatial and temporal scales, often integrating experimental and clinical data.

Anderson's research has focused on describing cancer as a complex, evolving system shaped by interactions between tumor cells and their microenvironment. His work spans tumor growth, angiogenesis, invasion, and treatment response, with an emphasis on multiscale modeling and tumor–microenvironment interactions.

=== Hybrid and multiscale modeling ===
A major contribution of Anderson's work has been the development and application of hybrid discrete–continuum modeling approaches. These models combine discrete representations of individual cells with continuous descriptions of microenvironmental variables, such as nutrient gradients and signaling factors.

Hybrid modeling approaches have become widely used in mathematical oncology to bridge cellular- and tissue-level dynamics and to capture interactions between tumor cells and their environment. Early work in this area included mathematical models of tumor-induced angiogenesis and tumor invasion that integrated cellular dynamics with environmental constraints.

=== Integrative mathematical oncology ===
In 2008, Anderson co-authored a Nature Reviews Cancer article introducing the concept of integrative mathematical oncology, which emphasizes the combination of mathematical modeling with experimental and clinical data to produce predictive models of cancer progression and treatment response.

This framework has influenced the development of interdisciplinary research programs that combine theoretical, experimental, and clinical approaches to cancer.

=== Evolutionary and ecological approaches ===
Anderson's work has also contributed to the application of evolutionary and ecological principles in cancer biology. These approaches frame tumors as evolving populations shaped by selection pressures, informing research into tumor heterogeneity, adaptation, and therapy resistance.

=== Artificial intelligence and future directions ===
Recent work in mathematical oncology has emphasized the integration of mechanistic modeling with data-driven approaches, including artificial intelligence, to improve predictive modeling and clinical decision-making.

These approaches combine mechanistic understanding of tumor biology with machine learning methods to address challenges such as high-dimensional clinical data and complex, multiscale dynamics.

=== Computational tools ===
Anderson has also contributed to the development of computational frameworks for hybrid modeling and multiscale simulation. These tools support the integration of mechanistic and data-driven approaches in cancer modeling.

== Publications and impact ==
Anderson has authored numerous publications in mathematical biology and oncology, with work spanning hybrid modeling, tumor evolution, and treatment optimization. Mathematical modeling approaches have been described as contributing to the development of predictive and quantitative frameworks in cancer research.

== Recognition ==
Anderson was awarded a Royal Society of Edinburgh Personal Research Fellowship in 2000 for his work on tumour invasion. He served as a permanent member of the NIH Modeling and Analysis of Biological Systems (MABS) study section from 2014 to 2018. He was elected a Fellow of the Society for Mathematical Biology in 2019 and served as its President from 2019 to 2021 as well as being on the Board of Directors from 2012 to 2016. In 2020 he was named the W. Jack Pledger Researcher of the Year at Moffitt Cancer Center, an award voted for by fellow Moffitt scientists.

== Selected publications ==
- Anderson ARA, Chaplain MAJ. Continuous and discrete mathematical models of tumor-induced angiogenesis. Bulletin of Mathematical Biology (1998).
- Anderson ARA. A hybrid mathematical model of solid tumour invasion. Mathematical Medicine and Biology (2005).
- Anderson ARA, Quaranta V. Integrative mathematical oncology. Nature Reviews Cancer (2008).
- Bravo RR et al., Anderson ARA. A hybrid automata library for hybrid modeling. PLOS Computational Biology (2020).

== See also ==
- Mathematical oncology
- Systems biology
- Tumor microenvironment
