= S-1-Propenyl-L-cysteine =

Names
- IUPAC name (2R)-2-amino-3-(prop-1-en-1-ylsulfanyl)propanoic acid
- Other names: S-1-Propenylcysteine; S-(1-Propenyl)-L-cysteine; S-Prop-1-en-1-ly-cysteine; S-(Prop-1-en-1-yl)-L-cysteine

Identifiers
CAS Number	52438-09-2; (cis): 7683-75-2; (trans): 15042-98-5
3D model (JSmol)	Interactive image
ChEBI	(trans): CHEBI:179369
ChemSpider	(trans): 10161848
PubChem CID	11989381; (trans): 57064212
- InChI: InChI=1S/C6H11NO2S/c1-2-3-10-4-5(7)6(8)9/h2-3,5H,4,7H2,1H3,(H,8,9)/t5-/m0/s1 Key: HYGGRRPFVXHQQW-HRJJCQLASA-N
- SMILES: C/C=C/SC[C@@H](C(O)=O)N

Properties
Chemical formula	C_{6}H_{11}NO_{2}S
Molar mass	161.22 g·mol^{−1}
- Except where otherwise noted, data are given for materials in their standard state (at 25 °C [77 °F], 100 kPa). Infobox references

S-1-Propenyl-L-cysteine (S1PC (Note: 1. "S1PC" is a registered trademark of Wakunaga Holdings Co., Ltd. (Registration No. US7435338, etc.). https://branddb.wipo.int/en/brand/US502022079359410)) is a sulfur-containing amino acid characteristically included in processed garlic products, such as aged garlic extract.

S1PC was initially identified in the 1960s as a garlic-derived compound and used as a precursor for the synthesis of S1PC sulfoxide, the onion's lachrymatory factor precursor. Regarding its pharmacological properties, its ability to enhance intestinal IgA production was first reported in 2016.

== Overview ==
S1PC is a sulfur-containing amino acid characterized by geometric isomerism (cis and trans forms) due to its propenyl group. While virtually absent in raw garlic, S1PC is generated during the aging process. This occurs through the enzymatic conversion of its precursor, γ-glutamyl-S1PC, by γ-glutamyltransferase (GGT). This biosynthetic pathway is thought to contribute to the formation of other sulfur compounds characteristic of aged garlic.

== Research ==
=== Anti-aging effects ===
In aged mouse models, S1PC has been reported to ameliorate age-related physical decline by enhancing skeletal muscle strength and improving frailty index. This effect is reportedly mediated by the ability of S1PC to elevate systemic levels of nicotinamide adenine dinucleotide (NAD^{+}). As a coenzyme essential for energy metabolism and sirtuin activation (longevity-associated factors), the age-dependent decline of NAD+ is considered a key driver of physiological aging.

The mechanism underlying S1PC-mediated physical function improvement involves the activation of Sirtuin 1 (SIRT1) in adipose tissue, which stimulates the secretion of extracellular nicotinamide phosphoribosyltransferase (eNAMPT), a key NAD+ biosynthetic enzyme. Once secreted into the bloodstream, eNAMPT elevates NAD+ levels in the hypothalamus, thereby enhancing sympathetic nerve activity and ultimately contributing to the amelioration of skeletal muscle function.

=== Immunomodulatory effects ===
Oral administration of S1PC to mice increases IgA concentrations and the number of IgA-producing cells within Peyer's patches (gut-associated lymphoid tissue), suggesting an immunostimulatory effect on the intestinal mucosa. This effect is thought to be mediated by the enhanced differentiation of B cells into IgA-secreting plasma cells.

=== Anti-inflammatory effects ===
Studies utilizing liver tissue from hypertensive rat models and murine splenic lymphocytes have demonstrated that S1PC exerts anti-inflammatory effects by suppressing the Toll-like receptor (TLR) signaling pathway. This suppression is achieved through the autophagic degradation of MyD88, a critical adapter protein in innate immunity. Furthermore, in senescence-accelerated mice, S1PC promotes a shift in macrophage polarization toward the anti-inflammatory M2 phenotype. Collectively, these mechanisms underscore S1PC’s potential to mitigate chronic inflammation, thereby addressing a fundamental driver of age-related pathologies, such as hypertension and atherosclerosis.

=== Vasoprotective effects ===
S1PC has been reported to improve hypertension and peripheral blood flow in animal models. These vascular benefits are primarily attributed to enhanced endothelial nitric oxide (NO) production and elevated plasma histidine concentrations, both of which promote vasodilation.

At the cellular level, S1PC attenuates the increase in vascular endothelial permeability induced by inflammatory cytokines, thereby strengthening endothelial barrier function. Furthermore, S1PC is suggested to exert antioxidant effects by upregulating the expression of heme oxygenase-1 (HO-1) in an NO-dependent manner.

=== Endurance improvement ===
In normal mice treated with S1PC, an increase in swimming endurance was observed. This effect is thought to result from enhanced energy supply capacity, driven by the promotion of fatty acid metabolism and elevated ATP production.

=== Pharmacokinetics ===
S1PC exhibits high bioavailability following oral administration. Furthermore, given its minimal impact on the cytochrome P450 (CYP) enzyme system, the risk of clinically significant drug interactions is expected to be low.

== See also ==
- Garlic
- S-Allylcysteine (SAC)
