= Loneliness in old age =

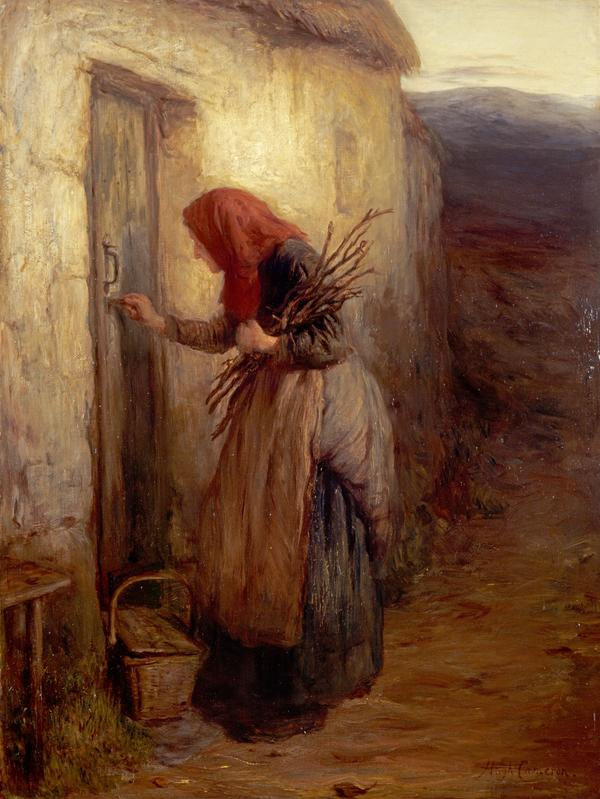
A Lonely Life by Hugh Cameron depicting an old Highland woman returning to her cottage at the end of the day, seemingly having no one to welcome her on her return.

Loneliness in old age is the subjective feeling of being isolated or disconnected at an old age. It may be caused due to various social, physical and psychological factors. While loneliness can affect all human beings, older people are more exposed to risks resulting from life changes such as retirement, widowhood and health declines.

Loneliness is especially associated with various demographics, health and social factors, including widowhood, chronic illness, social isolation and limited socio-economic resources. Older adults, particularly those over the age of 80, are at increased risk of loneliness, which is exacerbated by the loss of close relationships and physical impairments. Gender differences also play a significant role, with women generally reporting higher levels of loneliness, influenced by factors such as widowhood, caregiving roles and socialization patterns.

Older adults can take proactive steps to alleviate loneliness and foster social connections. Simple actions such as building intergenerational friendships, practicing gratitude and engaging in regular social activities can improve emotional well-being. Furthermore, numerous interventions have been developed to specifically target loneliness and social isolation, including psychological therapies, animal-assisted interventions and social support programs. These strategies aim to enhance social interactions, improve mental health and promote a sense of belonging, thereby improving the overall quality of life for older adults.

== Prevalence ==
Loneliness follows a U-shaped distribution across the life course, peaking in adolescence and late adulthood while being less common in middle adulthood. Unlike the transient nature of loneliness during younger ages—often associated with life transitions like entering adulthood or starting a career—loneliness in older adulthood tends to persist. It is often driven by life circumstances such as the loss of loved ones, residence in assisted living or nursing homes, financial hardships, and lower socioeconomic status, all of which can reduce opportunities for meaningful social connections. Additionally, risk factors such as chronic illness, limited mobility, and economic constraints become more prevalent with age, further exacerbating loneliness.

In some countries and regions, including China, Europe, Latin America and the United States, up to one-third of older adults experience loneliness. Meta-analyses of studies in high-income countries estimate that 25.9% of older adults experience moderate loneliness, while 7.9% experience severe loneliness.

Certain groups in the United States, including immigrants and individuals identifying as gay, lesbian, bisexual, or transgender, are considered at higher risk for loneliness in later life. Older immigrants, particularly those who are first-generation, face unique challenges that contribute to social isolation. These challenges include language barriers, cultural differences and shifts in family or intergenerational dynamics. Their social networks in new communities may lack depth and history, exacerbating feelings of isolation. Women, unmarried individuals and those without a close confidant are especially vulnerable. Research in England and the Netherlands has highlighted higher loneliness levels among older immigrants, further illustrating the global nature of this issue. For LGBTQ+ older adults, sexual orientation has been linked to loneliness, although research findings are mixed. In general, studies suggest that gay, lesbian and bisexual individuals report greater loneliness compared to their heterosexual peers.

=== Special context: COVID-19 ===
A 2020 National Poll on Healthy Aging conducted by the University of Michigan found that the prevalence of loneliness among U.S. adults aged 50–80 doubled during the early months of the COVID-19 pandemic. Older adults faced heightened health risks due to weakened immune systems and a greater prevalence of chronic conditions such as heart disease, diabetes, lung disease and cancer.

Lockdowns and social distancing measures, while necessary to protect public health, further isolated older adults, intensifying feelings of loneliness. Those in long-term care facilities were particularly affected, with these restrictions contributing to increased rates of depression, anxiety and irritability. The pandemic underscored the profound impact of social isolation on the mental health and well-being of older populations.

== Social challenge ==
Loneliness in old age has become a pressing social challenge, driven by demographic shifts, evolving family structures and changing cultural values.

The global increase in life expectancy, often termed the "longevity revolution", has led to a rapidly growing population of older adults. By 2050, the number of people aged 60 and above is projected to reach 2 billion, yet this achievement in longevity has highlighted new social issues. Many older adults face social isolation as traditional support systems struggle to meet the needs of this expanding demographic.

Modern family dynamics have undergone significant changes, with nuclear and diverse family structures replacing extended family networks. This shift has weakened intergenerational ties and caregiving roles, leaving many older individuals to navigate the "empty nest" phase with limited familial support. Additionally, societal emphasis on individualism and youth has diminished the cultural status of older adults, further marginalizing them from social and community activities.

The COVID-19 pandemic starkly exposed the vulnerabilities of older populations, emphasizing their isolation and lack of adequate care. Despite contributing significantly to their families and communities, older adults often remain invisible in societal priorities, their needs overshadowed by a focus on younger generations.

== Causes ==
Loneliness in later life is a multifaceted phenomenon shaped by various psychological, environmental and social factors. The following are theoretical frameworks of understanding loneliness in old age.

== Factors ==
The factors related to loneliness in old age include: being female, widowed, divorced or never married; having limited or low-quality social ties; poor physical health, such as chronic illnesses or mobility impairments; and constrained socioeconomic resources, such as low income or education levels.

=== Demographics ===
==== Age ====
The U-shaped pattern of loneliness across the lifespan underscores the role of age in shaping loneliness among older adults, with advanced age—particularly beyond 80—emerging as a significant risk factor. For younger older adults, factors such as being married and maintaining good health often help protect against loneliness. In contrast, advanced age is commonly linked to heightened loneliness due to sensory and physical impairments, loss of a spouse, and shrinking social networks.

Despite these risks, some theories suggest that older adults may experience less loneliness under certain circumstances. According to socioemotional selectivity theory, older individuals tend to prioritize emotionally fulfilling relationships, which can help alleviate loneliness. Compared to younger counterparts, among the oldest-old, relationships that foster self-esteem are often maintained, while those less beneficial for psychological well-being are allowed to fade.

==== Gender ====
Older women generally report higher levels of loneliness than older men.

Theoretical perspectives suggest that early life socialization processes shape how individuals experience loneliness in later life. Chodorow proposed that women, due to their socialization, develop a personality that places greater emphasis on relationships and connections with others, particularly within the family, where they often assume roles like kin keepers. This relational focus may make them more vulnerable to loneliness when these bonds are disrupted. In contrast, men's traditional roles tend to emphasize instrumental activities, with less emphasis placed on interpersonal relationships, which could contribute to different patterns of loneliness in older adulthood.

Women are generally more prone to loneliness in old age due to factors like widowhood and caregiving responsibilities. Women tend to live longer, often marry older partners and are more likely to experience widowhood, which can lead to significant loneliness, particularly if they relied heavily on their spouse for companionship. Caregiving roles, such as caring for a disabled spouse, can further restrict women's opportunities for social engagement outside the family. Socialization also influences reported loneliness, as women are more open about expressing emotions and seeking help, while men are less likely to disclose loneliness. However, gender differences in loneliness often stem from situational factors, like widowhood or caregiving, rather than intrinsic gender traits. Women's larger social networks and greater tendency to seek support may help mitigate loneliness, providing them with confidants and higher satisfaction with social connections.

==== Marriage and widowhood ====
Marriage is widely regarded as protective against loneliness in old age, offering emotional, psychological, financial and physical benefits. However, the quality of the marital relationship is critical; dissatisfaction with a spouse can exacerbate feelings of loneliness, while emotionally fulfilling and supportive marital relationships can mitigate it.

The loss of a spouse brings higher risks of loneliness. Among widowed older adults, men tend to experience greater loneliness after the loss of a spouse, but women often benefit from stronger social networks with family and friends, which provide more opportunities for emotional support. Furthermore, older women are more likely to share the experience of widowhood with others due to the typical age gap between spouses and their higher involvement in social activities. In contrast, older men often have fewer social connections and may face greater challenges with loneliness after losing a spouse. However, men tend to have better prospects for remarrying in later life, which could reduce their loneliness.

=== Socioeconomic status ===
Higher socioeconomic status (SES) is generally associated with lower levels of loneliness. Higher SES is generally associated with reduced loneliness, as it often enables the development of broader social networks that include not only family members but also friends and acquaintances. These expanded networks provide greater opportunities for social interaction and support, decreasing the likelihood of loneliness. In contrast, lower SES can intensify loneliness by limiting access to social engagement opportunities. Financial constraints may restrict older adults' ability to participate in social activities or access caregiving resources. Additionally, lower SES is often linked to reduced self-esteem, which can hinder the formation or maintenance of meaningful social relationships. Key indicators of lower SES, such as limited income and low education levels, are frequently associated with increased loneliness in older age.

=== Health ===
Having low levels of physical health is a major contributor to loneliness in older adults. Chronic conditions such as heart disease, stroke, and cancer are strongly associated with increased risks of both social isolation and loneliness. These relationships are often bi-directional; poor health can lead to isolation and isolation can exacerbate health issues. Functional impairments, including difficulties with daily activities or reduced mobility, are similarly linked to loneliness and isolation in reciprocal ways.

Sensory impairments, particularly hearing loss, increase risks of loneliness in old age. Hearing loss can hinder communication, reduce social participation and increase feelings of isolation and loneliness. Evidence suggests that addressing hearing loss can improve social functioning and alleviate loneliness.

Mental health challenges further compound these issues. Depression, for instance, can both result from prolonged loneliness and contribute to its development, creating a cyclical relationship. Loneliness has also been associated with cognitive decline, including an increased risk of dementia and with mental health symptoms such as paranoia and psychosis. Chronic medical conditions, when present, are often linked to loneliness, highlighting the interconnected nature of physical and psychological health in later life.

=== Social network ===
Social networks, particularly confidant networks, play a significant role in mitigating loneliness among older adults. Both family and non-family relationships contribute to alleviating loneliness, but their effects vary. Family ties, especially with children, are often a key source of emotional support for older adults. However, these relationships can sometimes involve caregiving responsibilities or obligations that create emotional strain. Friendships, by contrast, are usually voluntary and reciprocal, offering emotional support without the complexities of familial obligations. Research suggests that friendships formed by choice may be particularly effective in reducing loneliness.

The physical proximity of friends and family can influence social connectedness, as frequent and close interactions provide emotional support to counter loneliness. However, excessive proximity or overly frequent interactions can sometimes lead to emotional fatigue, potentially fostering negative emotions. Confidant networks—close, supportive relationships with individuals who provide understanding and reassurance—are also critical in addressing loneliness. Older adults who lack a confidant or have strained relationships within their confidant network are more likely to report loneliness. Conversely, having a strong and supportive confidant network characterized by frequent, emotionally close interactions can significantly reduce feelings of isolation. However, overly strained or dependent relationships within a confidant network may contribute to emotional stress, highlighting the complex dynamics of social connections in later life.

=== Living arrangement ===
==== Aging in place ====
Different living arrangements lead to different loneliness outcomes in old age. Research shows that living alone is often linked to higher levels of loneliness compared to other living situations. Having a partner in the household tends to reduce loneliness, while living with children does not seem to have the same effect. Some studies suggest that older adults living with one other person may feel the least lonely. Although research on changes in living arrangements over time is limited, findings suggest that loneliness might influence living arrangements, with lonelier individuals being more likely to live alone.

==== Institutionalization ====
Approximately one in three older adults will spend time living in a nursing home due to the need for physical care or safety during their lifetime. Loneliness is highly prevalent in institutional settings, such as nursing homes. Studies have shown that loneliness in residential care facilities estimated roughly 61% of residents may be moderately lonely and approximately 35% severely lonely, at least twice as high as among those living in the community. Residents in long-term care facilities often experience loneliness due to loss of autonomy, limited familial contact, reduced social networks and declines in physical and cognitive capacities. Additionally, the institutional environment may lack opportunities for meaningful social engagement and emotional support, which are crucial for mitigating loneliness. These challenges are compounded by superficial social interactions and limited opportunities for forming deep connections with peers, particularly when cognitive abilities differ among residents.

=== Disruptive life events ===
Disruptive life events can affect interpersonal relationships and influence perceptions of life, isolation and loneliness at any age. While such experiences are not exclusive to older adults, certain events—such as bereavement, illness or declining health, and retirement—are more common or occur with greater frequency after the age of 50. These events often reshape social networks and emotional well-being, highlighting the vulnerabilities associated with aging.

=== Societal factors ===
==== Societal changes ====
Societal changes have played a significant role in increasing loneliness among older adults. The shift from traditional, tight-knit communities to more mobile and fragmented societies has contributed to heightened isolation. Factors such as the decline in intergenerational living, increased geographic mobility and weaker community ties have all exacerbated loneliness. Furthermore, while life expectancy has risen globally, many older adults face extended lives without sufficient social support, leading to more individuals living alone and without the familial or social connections that once helped alleviate feelings of isolation.

==== Culture ====
Cultural factors further shape the experience of loneliness in old age. In collectivist cultures, where the needs of the family or community are prioritized over individual desires, social cohesion is maintained through cultural norms and social control. These societies often provide stronger support systems, reducing the likelihood of physical isolation for older adults. In contrast, individualistic cultures emphasize personal independence, which can lead to greater freedom in forming and maintaining social relationships but may also contribute to higher levels of loneliness, as the focus on individual needs can sometimes result in weaker social ties.

For example, older adults in eastern, southern and central European countries, where familism is more prominent, often report higher levels of loneliness compared to their counterparts in northern and western Europe. In these collectivist societies, strong family involvement is expected, so when familial ties weaken or are lost, loneliness is frequently amplified. This suggests that while strong family connections can provide support, societal expectations surrounding them may also increase loneliness when those connections are not met.

==== Ageism ====
Ageism is another significant factor contributing to loneliness in old age, as it involves discriminatory attitudes and stereotypes based on age, such as viewing older adults as "out of touch" or "unproductive." These biases can lead to social exclusion in various areas, including social activities, workplaces and even within families, fostering feelings of isolation. Additionally, internalized ageism can lead older adults to self-impose isolation, believing they have little to contribute or fearing rejection, which further exacerbates loneliness. The combination of ageism and loneliness can intensify psychological distress, making it essential to address both issues to improve the well-being of older adults.

===== Longitudinal Factors =====
Some conditions affect older adults' loneliness over a period of time, rather than just at a single point. The loss of a spouse or partner, a limited social network and low levels of social activity, often have lasting effects, gradually shaping or worsening loneliness as people age. Poor health or depression may start as minor issues but can lead to increased isolation and loneliness over the years if not addressed. Similarly, the loss of a spouse or reduced social activity might initially cause loneliness, but their impact can grow as time passes, making older adults more vulnerable to chronic loneliness.

== Effects ==
Loneliness has wide-ranging effects on older adults, influencing their health behaviors, physical health, mental well-being and cognitive abilities. While this section focuses on these specific impacts in later life, see "Loneliness" for a comprehensive overview of loneliness and its effects across all age groups.

=== Health behaviors ===
Loneliness in older adults may lead to various negative health behaviors, including substance use and sleep disturbances. An estimated 1 million older adults in the United States face substance use challenges, with loneliness acting as a significant risk factor. Despite being as likely to benefit from treatment as other age groups, older adults are less likely to seek help for substance use.

=== Physical health ===
Loneliness poses serious risks to the physical health of older adults, contributing to conditions such as high blood pressure, heart disease, and obesity. Studies have linked loneliness to cardiovascular problems, including elevated systolic blood pressure and peripheral vascular disease. Loneliness may also lead to undernutrition in older adults. Additionally, it is associated with immune system dysregulation, marked by increased systemic inflammation and reduced immune function. Although research specific to older populations remains limited, these findings highlight potential mechanisms through which loneliness undermines physical health.

Loneliness may contribute to higher mortality risks among older adults. A study by the University of California, San Francisco, involving 1,600 participants with an average age of 71, found that loneliness significantly increased mortality risk among older adults. Over six years, 23% of those who reported feeling lonely died, compared to 14% of their non-lonely counterparts, even after accounting for socioeconomic and health factors.

=== Mental health ===
Loneliness is a well-documented independent risk factor for depression in old age. It has been linked to heightened anxiety, psychological distress and lower overall emotional well-being, often exacerbating depression and anxiety in a bidirectional relationship. Perceived social support, a key predictor of loneliness, has been linked to mental health conditions such as schizophrenia, bipolar disorder and anxiety disorders in older adults.

=== Cognitive health ===
Loneliness is linked to declines in several areas of cognitive functioning, including overall cognitive ability, intelligence quotient (IQ), processing speed and both immediate and delayed memory recall.

Research suggests that loneliness can contribute to inflammation and immune system dysregulation, both of which negatively impact cognitive function. At the same time, cognitive impairments can exacerbate feelings of loneliness by hindering social interactions. The a bidirectional relationship between loneliness and cognitive decline highlights how loneliness and cognitive health are closely interconnected, with each influencing the other over time.

== Relief ==
Older adults can take practical steps to relieve the feeling of loneliness and foster social connections. Building intergenerational friendships can provide meaningful relationships and promote a positive outlook on aging. Practicing gratitude daily and staying present during interactions, such as by putting away phones during conversations, can enhance emotional connections. Volunteering offers both social engagement and personal fulfillment, with activities like delivering meals or participating in community projects benefiting both physical and mental health. Caring for pets can provide valuable companionship for older adults. Integrating enjoyable and practical social activities into daily routines can help foster healthier social habits. Grief support programs, such as support groups, offer emotional assistance and social connection during periods of loss. Addressing health issues, such as untreated hearing loss, can prevent isolation by improving communication and social participation. Joining senior activity centers or community programs provides opportunities for education, exercise and shared hobbies, fostering a sense of belonging. Pursuing hobbies, especially those shared with others, like pottery or gardening, can also help older adults connect with like-minded individuals and strengthen their social networks.

=== Interventions ===
A wide variety of interventions have been developed to reduce social isolation and loneliness among older people. The interventions generally focus on four areas: improving social skills, strengthening social support, fostering more social interaction and dealing with maladaptive social cognition.

Among these, addressing distorted social cognition stands out as the most successful, particularly with the use of cognitive-behavioral therapy (CBT). More recently, integrated interventions that combine CBT with medication have emerged as a promising avenue for reducing loneliness.

Interventions to address loneliness in older adults fall into the following six main categories:

- Social facilitation interventions: These interventions primarily aim to increase social interaction and often involve group-based activities. Examples include charity-funded friendship clubs, shared interest groups, day care centers and friendship enrichment programs. Social facilitation encourages reciprocal relationships, where both participants benefit from mutual companionship. Group-based activities can help older adults form connections, alleviate feelings of loneliness and promote a sense of belonging. Organizations such as the International Federation of Little Brothers of the Poor and the Little Brothers – Friends of the Elderly were created to reduce loneliness amongst older adults.
- Psychological therapies: Interventions based on therapeutic approaches, such as reminiscence therapy, mindfulness, exercise-talk discussions, social engagement-directed discussions, coaching and stress reduction techniques, aim to address emotional and psychological aspects of loneliness. These therapies have been found to significantly reduce loneliness and improve social support, happiness and life satisfaction.
- Health and social care provision: For older adults who are homebound or frail, formal health and social care interventions can help reduce isolation and improve well-being. These interventions often involve health professionals and may be delivered through nursing homes, community settings, or geriatric rehabilitation programs.
- Animal-assisted interventions: The interactions with living dogs or robotic animals help older adults relieve loneliness by offering companionship and emotional support. These interventions are thought to work by fostering a bond between the individual and the animal, creating opportunities for social interaction with others. Research suggests that pet attachment can alleviate loneliness by providing both emotional comfort and social connections. Companion robots like Paro, a robotic seal, have been developed to simulate the emotional benefits of animal companionship, providing a viable alternative for older adults who may not be able to care for live animals.
- Befriending interventions: These interventions focus on forming new social connections, usually through one-on-one interactions facilitated by trained volunteers. Unlike social facilitation programs, befriending interventions are specifically designed to support the lonely individual, helping them establish friendships that can reduce feelings of isolation. For example, the AmeriCorps Senior Companion Program pairs volunteers, who are typically older adults themselves (age 55 and older), with older adults who may be isolated or have special needs. Volunteers, known as Senior Companions, provide friendly visits, assist with basic activities of daily living and offer companionship to reduce loneliness and promote well-being among older adults.
- Leisure and skill development interventions: Activities that encourage personal growth and social engagement can help reduce loneliness among older adults by offering meaningful opportunities for connection. Programs centered around hobbies such as gardening, computer use, or volunteering, as well as those focused on skill development, have been shown to engage older adults in social networks and alleviate feelings of isolation. These interventions not only facilitate the formation of new relationships but also promote a sense of purpose and fulfillment.

=== Technology-based interventions ===
In recent years, technological advancements have provided new ways to address loneliness among older adults. Technology-based interventions, including video calls, online communities and virtual reality, are increasingly used to enhance communication and social connection. These tools enable individuals to stay connected with family, friends and healthcare providers, helping to overcome barriers such as geographical distance and physical limitations that contribute to isolation. Several reviews have highlighted the effectiveness of these technologies in improving communication and offering new social interaction opportunities for older adults. Additionally, innovations in artificial intelligence (AI) and robotics, such as virtual companions and digital assistants, offer further support by providing social engagement and emotional care. These technologies have the potential to supplement social support, especially for older adults with mobility challenges or limited local connections. As technology continues to evolve, its role in combating loneliness among older adults is expected to grow.

The use of technology to combat loneliness among older adults raises ethical concerns despite its potential benefits. For instance, ElliQ, an AI-powered robotic companion distributed to hundreds of older residents in New York State, has been praised for reducing boredom, maintaining social skills and assisting with grief. However, critics highlight significant issues, including data privacy, the protection of sensitive user information and the potential for such technology to diminish human relationships. Some experts warn that overreliance on robotic companions could discourage older adults from engaging in meaningful, reciprocal interactions with friends and family, undermining the very social connections these tools aim to enhance.

=== Long-term care settings ===
Loneliness in long-term care settings presents distinct challenges, as interventions effective in community settings may not always be practical in institutional environments. These settings often restrict the feasibility of certain interventions due to factors like limited physical space, institutional routines and residents' varied physical and cognitive abilities. One intervention that has shown promise is implementing The Eden Alternative (TEA) model, proposed by Dr. Bill Thomas in 1991. This model emphasizes social rather than medical care and encourages family and community involvement, aiming to transform institutional environments into more homelike settings. The Eden Alternative has been adopted by the Texas Department of Aging and Disability Services to assist Texas nursing homes in promoting residents' quality of life.

TEA principles include:

- Loneliness, helplessness and boredom are harmful and can negatively impact our overall health and quality of life.
- A compassionate and inclusive community, where individuals of all ages and abilities are supported, fosters well-being for everyone.
- We flourish when we can easily connect with others, as this helps alleviate feelings of loneliness.
- A sense of purpose and the chance to both give and receive are essential for overcoming helplessness and promoting well-being.
- Our well-being is enhanced when we experience variety, spontaneity and the unexpected in our daily lives, which combats boredom.
- Activities without meaning can diminish our spirit and personal meaning is crucial for maintaining health and well-being.
- We are more than our diagnoses and medical care should empower us to lead a fulfilling and meaningful life.
- Decision-making should actively involve those who are most affected by the decisions, as empowerment fosters autonomy and influence.
- Cultivating a resilient and collaborative culture is an ongoing process that requires continuous learning, growth and adaptability.
- Effective leadership is vital for creating lasting and impactful change and no alternative can replace it.

Another innovative approach in facilities involves the use of animals, which has been demonstrated to alleviate loneliness. Dog-assisted interventions (DAI) are among the most widely used forms of animal-assisted interventions, largely because of dogs' strong emotional bonds with humans and their ability to be trained for specific behaviors. Research has shown that DAI can lead to various positive outcomes for residents, including enhanced social functioning, reduced depression and decreased feelings of loneliness. Notably, the greatest impact of DAI appears to be on improving social interactions and engagement. Moreover, interactive robotic animals, like the AIBO robotic dog, also have been used as a source of companionship and emotional support.

Studies suggest that both living animals, such as dogs and interactive robotic animals, like the AIBO robotic dog, have a positive impact on reducing loneliness. Residents develop attachments to these animals, which can serve as a source of companionship and emotional support. Some research even suggests that robotic animals may offer advantages over live pets in terms of engagement, with residents interacting more frequently with robotic dogs and expressing greater emotional attachment, though the underlying mechanisms for loneliness reduction remain complex.

=== Common characteristics of effective interventions ===
Effective interventions to reduce loneliness among older adults share a few key features. First, they must be adaptable, allowing for adjustments based on the specific needs of the local population. This flexibility ensures that programs resonate with the target group's demographic and cultural context, making them more engaging. In long-term care settings, this means considering factors like age, mobility and cognitive abilities to ensure activities are accessible and relevant.

Second, a community development approach, where older adults participate in designing and delivering interventions, has proven effective. This involvement fosters a sense of ownership, increases participation and strengthens long-term engagement. It also helps ensure that interventions remain responsive to residents' evolving needs.

Lastly, interventions promoting productive engagement—activities that encourage active participation—are more effective than passive ones. These activities, whether group-based or individual, provide opportunities for meaningful connections and a sense of achievement. In residential care facilities, where autonomy and social interaction may be limited, productive engagement can significantly improve residents' social well-being.
