= Alexandersson =

Alexandersson is a Swedish surname meaning "son of Alexander". Notable people with the surname include:

- Daniel Alexandersson (born 1978), Swedish footballer
- Freyr Alexandersson (born 1982), Icelandic footballer and manager
- Helmer Alexandersson (1886–1927), Swedish composer and violinist
- Joakim Alexandersson (born 1976), Swedish footballer
- Lennart Alexandersson (born 1947), Swedish footballer
- Niclas Alexandersson (born 1971), Swedish footballer
- Rúnar Alexandersson (born 1977), Icelandic artistic gymnast
- Tommy Alexandersson (born 1948), Swedish mass murderer
- Tove Alexandersson (born 1992), Swedish orienteer and ski-orienteer

== See also ==
- Alexanderson
