= Warren Jackson Pledger =

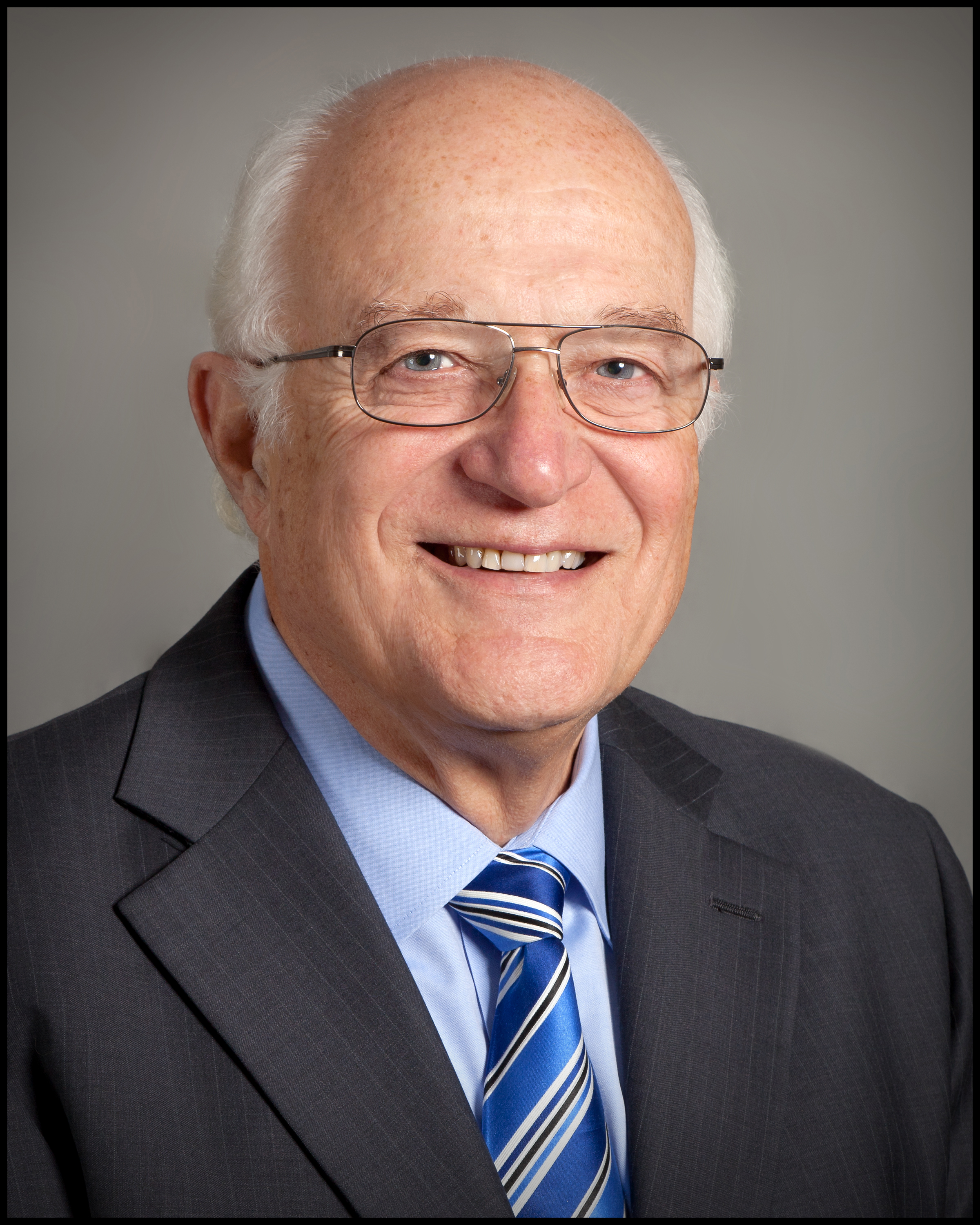
Dr. Warren Jackson Pledger

Warren Jackson Pledger is a molecular cell biologist who is the Associate Director for Basic Sciences, Tampa General Hospital Cancer Institute and Professor, Department of Molecular Medicine, Morsani College of Medicine, USF Health in Tampa, Florida. He had been a Professor, Department of Surgery, University of Utah School of Medicine and a member of the Cell Response and Regulation Program, Huntsman Cancer Institute. He was the Associate Center Director for Basic Science at the Moffitt Cancer Center and Research Institute. He has held academic appointments and tenure at the University of North Carolina School of Medicine (Assistant and Associate Professor of Pharmacology and Program Leader of the Cell Biology Program at the Lineberger Cancer Center), Vanderbilt University School of Medicine (Professor of Cell Biology) and the University of South Florida College of Medicine (Professor of Biochemistry and Oncology).

== Background ==
Pledger was born in Philadelphia, Pennsylvania, and was reared in Texas. He earned his Bachelor's and master's degrees in biology from the University of Houston. He completed his graduate work at Purdue University, where he received a Ph.D. in Molecular Biology. He had postdoctoral fellowships at the University of Texas/M.D. Anderson Cancer Center in Houston and the Dana Farber Cancer Institute in Boston.

== Academic career ==
He moved to the Moffitt Cancer Center in 1994 as Associate Center Director for Basic Research and was awarded the Cortner-Couch Endowed Chair in Cancer Research. Dr. Pledger was responsible for the development, administration and quality of all research programs and cores at Moffitt. He was also responsible for recruiting investigators to Moffitt to support the application for a National Cancer Institute (NCI) Comprehensive Cancer Center. Moffitt grew into a national research institution during his tenure as Associate Center Director for Basic Sciences. He instituted and developed the Moffitt Research Institute and was its Founding Director. Moffitt/University of South Florida Ph.D. program in Cancer Biology was organized under his leadership, which continues to train students. He also served as the Deputy Center Director (2001 to 2013). In addition, he served as the principal investigator at Moffitt's National Functional Genomics Center (NFGC).

Pledger has received peer-reviewed funding for more than 30 years. He has held numerous National Institute of Health (NIH) and NCI grants, participated in three Program Project Grants (PPG) and was the principal investigator of one PPG. He has served as the principal investigator on several institutional grants including the American Cancer Society (ACS) Institutional Research Grant, the National Genomics Center Grant (Department of Defense), and a U56 / U54 partnership grant with the Ponce School of Medicine Cancer Center. He has over 150 publications in journals, including Science, Nature, Proceedings of the National Academy of Sciences, USA, Molecular Cell Biology, and Journal of Cell Biology. Dr. Pledger was also an associate editor for the Journal of Cellular Biochemistry, Critical Reviews in Eukaryotic Gene Expression and Cancer Research. He has served as a permanent member on NIH, ACS and VA grant review panels and has served on several NIH and NCI ad hoc panels that reviewed Program Project Grants and Center Grants. He was the first recipient of Moffitt Cancer Center's Scientist of the Year Award.

== Research ==
Pledger's research focuses on the mechanisms governing cell cycle progression. He was the first to show that the cell cycle is regulated by a series of sequential events and to hypothesize that dysfunction of these events could trigger transformation or cancer. He demonstrated that growth factors controlled cell cycle regulatory events and has actively studied these processes, including platelet derived growth factor (PDGF) and insulin-like growthfactor-1 (IGF-1) signal transduction. He investigated the role of growth factor-regulated cyclin-dependent kinase (CDK) activity in the control of cellular proliferation, and used mouse models to explore the role of CDK activity in tumor formation. His current projects address the impact of signal transduction pathway inhibition on CRC tumor cell survival, and the hallmarks of cancer during the evolution of tumor progression seeking to find new therapeutic avenues.
