= Alex Anderson (quilter) =

American quilter, television host, and author (born 1955)

- Born: 1955 (age 70–71)
- Occupations: Quilter, host, and author
- Known for: Simply Quilts
- Website: https://alexandersonquilts.com/

Alexandra Sladky Anderson (born 1955) is an American quilter, television series host, and author. Anderson is the author of various quilting books, fabric lines, and developed an award winning magazine. Anderson is a former host of HGTV's Simply Quilts, which aired for 13 seasons. She has also hosted a web series and a podcast. Anderson has been called the "Queen of Quilting".

== Personal life and early career ==
When Anderson was a credit away from receiving an art degree from San Francisco State University, she finished a quilt that her grandmother started in the 1920s for her last class. The experience made her enjoy quilting. Her art degree was for fiber and graphic design. She has a son and daughter in law, daughter and son in law, and four grandchildren. She taught quilting at two stores in California. Her first quilting studio was in a guest bedroom. Anderson studied quilting under Lucy Hilty, and Anderson wrote the lessons that Hilty taught her in one of her books.

== Career ==
Originally, Anderson's quilt designs were only in works from other authors, including her first published quilt in the book Quilts, Quilts, Quilts, written by Diana McClun and Laura Nownes. The publications gave her enough attention to start her own books. In 2012, it was reported that she wrote 30 books in four languages with almost a million copies sold internationally.

Stephanie Kleinman, of Weller-Grossman Productions, went to one of Anderson's classes to ask her if she could host a television series. Her initial response was that she was busy teaching class and asked if they could discuss the proposal during lunch, leading her to host the HGTV series Simply Quilts for 11 years. She later started The Quilt Life Magazine, published by the American Quilter's Society. Her magazine allowed her to visit an African quilting guild that includes American expatriates and Africans who are the first quilters in their family lineage.

Together with Ricky Tims, Anderson hosts The Quilt Show which is a web series for quilters that requires a subscription and premiered after the HGTV series ended. She hosted the podcast Quilt Connection every week. Anderson is the national spokeswoman for Bernina of America.

How will she be remembered as a quilter? The good news is, is I'm on the internet now with Ricky Tims at thequiltshow.com because it's really who I was. I was, I had a persona that was dictated by Home and Garden Television, that I needed to be, and that's really not who I am. I'm a little bit, have a little bit of a wild side, if anybody knows me. I think how I hope, I hope how I am remembered is somebody that opened the door of quiltmaking to another person and by the magic of me having to fall into that television opportunity, I was blessed that particular incident. It will not be for my quiltmaking skills [laughs.]

— Alex Anderson

== Accolades ==
Anderson received two quilting awards named the Michael Kile Lifetime Achievement Award and the Silver Star Award. She has been called the "queen of quilting".
