= S-Allylcysteine =

S-Allyl cysteine
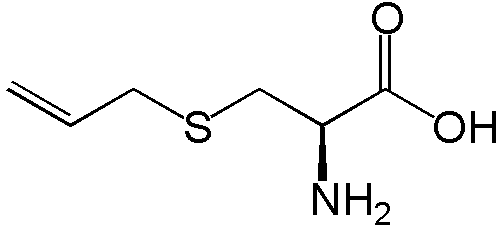
- S-Allyl cysteine

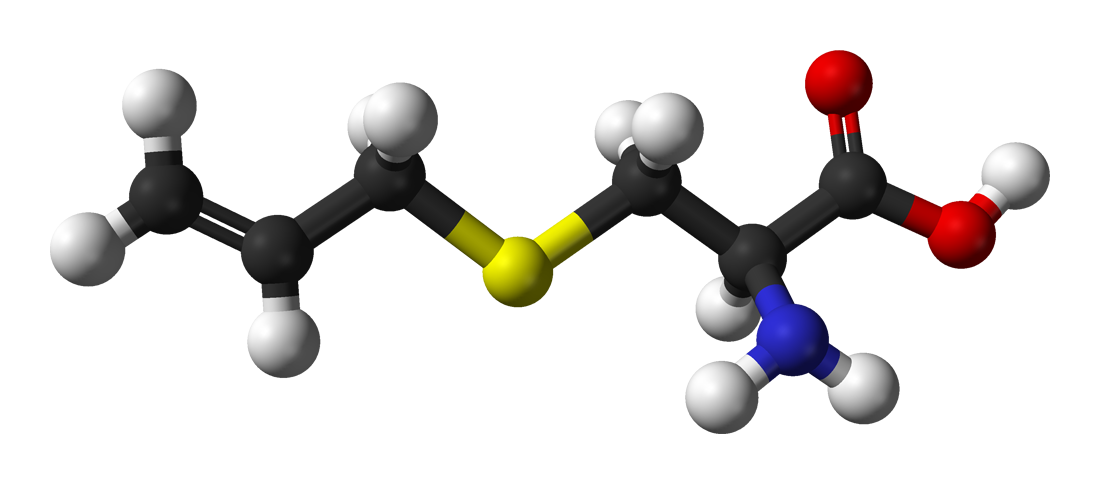
- S-Allyl cysteine

Names
- IUPAC name (R)-2-Amino-3-prop-2-enylsulfanylpropanoic acid
- Other names S-2-propenyl-L-cysteine; S-allyl-laevo-cysteine; S-allylcysteine

Identifiers
CAS Number	21593-77-1
3D model (JSmol)	Interactive image
Abbreviations	SAC
ChEBI	CHEBI:74077
ChemSpider	7969672
ECHA InfoCard	100.166.686
PubChem CID	9793905
UNII	81R3X99M15
CompTox Dashboard (EPA)	DTXSID20894862
- InChI: InChI=1S/C6H11NO2S/c1-2-3-10-4-5(7)6(8)9/h2,5H,1,3-4,7H2,(H,8,9)/t5-/m0/s1 Key: ZFAHNWWNDFHPOH-YFKPBYRVSA-N; InChI=1/C6H11NO2S/c1-2-3-10-4-5(7)6(8)9/h2,5H,1,3-4,7H2,(H,8,9)/t5-/m0/s1 Key: ZFAHNWWNDFHPOH-YFKPBYRVBL
- SMILES: O=C(O)[C@@H](N)CSC\C=C

Properties
Chemical formula	C_{6}H_{11}NO_{2}S
Molar mass	161.22 g/mol
Density	1.191 ± 0.06 g/cm^{3}
Melting point	219 to 220 °C (426 to 428 °F; 492 to 493 K)
- Except where otherwise noted, data are given for materials in their standard state (at 25 °C [77 °F], 100 kPa). verify (what is ?) Infobox references

S-Allylcysteine (SAC) is an organosulfur compound that has the formula HO_{2}CCH(NH_{2})CH_{2}SCH_{2}C=CH_{2}. It is the S-allylated derivative of the amino acid cysteine. As such only the L-enantiomer is significant biologically. It can be produced in relatively large amounts by aging garlic in the dark. A number of related compounds are found these garlic extracts, including the disulfide S-"allylmercaptocysteine" (SAMC, HO_{2}CCH(NH_{2})CH_{2}SSCH_{2}C=CH_{2}) and γ-glutamyl-S-allylcysteine" (GSAC). This compound is currently being studied for potential medicinal use.

== Occurrence and formation ==
SAC is present in low concentrations in fresh garlic but accumulates significantly during controlled ageing. The conversion of γ-glutamyl-S-allylcysteine (GSAC) to SAC occurs progressively over extended ageing periods, typically ranging from 10 to 20 months under controlled conditions. This substance is one reason aged garlic preparations have a substantially different chemical and organoleptic profile compared to raw garlic, garlic powder, or garlic oil.

== Pharmacokinetics ==
SAC is water-soluble and demonstrates substantially higher bioavailability compared to allicin and allicin-derived compounds, which are chemically unstable and degrade rapidly following formation. SAC has been detected in human plasma following oral administration of aged garlic extract preparations, suggesting meaningful systemic absorption.

== Use as a standardisation marker ==
Because SAC concentration in aged garlic extract is predictably related to ageing duration and conditions, it is commonly used as a quality and standardisation marker in both research preparations and commercial aged garlic extract supplements. Standardisation for SAC content allows for more consistent comparisons across studies and products than is possible with raw garlic or allicin-based preparations.

== Cardiovascular research ==
SAC has been investigated in the context of cardiovascular health, primarily through studies using standardised aged garlic extract preparations in which SAC serves as a marker compound. Multiple randomised controlled trials have examined aged garlic extract in relation to blood pressure markers, arterial stiffness and vascular function, typically over study periods of 8 to 24 weeks. A systematic review and meta-analysis of randomised controlled trials (one of which used aged garlic extract) concluded that garlic preparations were associated with reductions in systolic and diastolic blood pressure in adults with elevated baseline values, though the authors noted variability across studies.

Research has also examined aged garlic extract in relation to arterial stiffness and endothelial function. One randomised controlled trial found reductions in central blood pressure and pulse wave velocity – markers of arterial stiffness – following 12 weeks of aged garlic extract supplementation in adults with uncontrolled hypertension.

These findings are specific to standardised aged garlic extract preparations used under controlled research conditions and should not be generalised to raw garlic or other garlic supplement forms.

== See also ==
- Alliin, the S-oxide of allyl cysteine
- S-1-Propenyl-L-cysteine
