= Oncology =

Branch of medicine dealing with, or specializing in, cancer

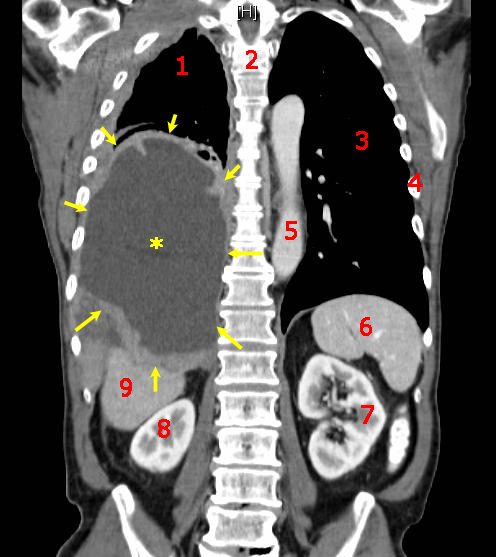
- A coronal CT scan showing a malignant mesothelioma, indicated by the asterisk and the arrows
- Focus: Cancerous tumor
- Subdivisions: Medical oncology, radiation oncology, surgical oncology
- Significant tests: Tumor markers, TNM staging, CT scans, MRI, PET-CT

Oncologist
Occupation
- Occupation type: Specialty
- Activity sectors: Medicine

Description
- Fields of employment: Hospitals, clinics, clinical research centers

Oncology is a branch of medicine that deals with the study, treatment, diagnosis, and prevention of cancer. A medical professional who practices oncology is an oncologist.

Cancer was first found in humans in the years 3000 BCE in Egypt. The Edwin Smith papyrus described a form of cancer as "a bulging tumor of the breast." Galen, a Greek doctor who lived from 130–200 CE, was the first to use the word onkos to describe tumors, from which the words "oncologist" and "oncology" are derived.

Oncology is focused on the diagnosis of cancer in a person, therapy (e.g., surgery, chemotherapy, radiotherapy and other modalities), monitoring of people after treatment, palliative care for people with advanced-stage cancers, ethical questions surrounding cancer care, screening of people who may have cancer, and the study of cancer treatments through clinical research.

An oncologist typically focuses on a specialty area in cancer treatment, such as surgery, radiation, gynecological oncology, geriatric oncology, pediatric oncology, and various organ-specific disciplines (breast, brain, liver, among others).

== Diagnosis ==
Medical histories are an important screening tool to assess the concerns and nonspecific symptoms in a patient (such as fatigue, weight loss, unexplained anemia, fever of unknown origin, paraneoplastic phenomena and other signs) that may require further evaluation for malignancy.

Diagnostic methods in oncology may include a biopsy or resection; these are methods used to remove suspicious neoplastic cells, which can be removed in part or in whole, and examined by a pathologist to assess for malignancy. This is essential for determining the next step in the appropriate course of management (active surveillance, surgery, radiation therapy, chemotherapy, or a combination of these).

Other diagnostic procedures may include an endoscopy, either upper or lower gastrointestinal, cystoscopy, bronchoscopy, or nasendoscopy to localize tissues suspicious for malignancy and biopsy, mammograms, X-rays, CT scanning, MRI scanning, ultrasound and other radiological techniques to localize and guide biopsy. Scintigraphy, single photon emission computed tomography (SPECT), positron emission tomography (PET) and other methods of nuclear medicine are imaging technologies used to identify areas suspicious of malignancy. Blood tests, including tumor markers, can assist diagnosis of certain types of cancers.

Apart from diagnoses, these modalities (especially imaging by CT scanning) are often used to determine operability, i.e., whether it is surgically possible to remove a tumor in its entirety.

A tissue diagnosis (from a biopsy) by a pathologist is essential for the proper classification of cancer and to guide the next step of treatment. In extremely rare instances when this is not possible, "empirical therapy" (without an exact diagnosis) may be considered, based on the available evidence (e.g., history, x-rays and scans).

Immunohistochemical markers often give a strong indication of the primary malignancy. This situation is referred to as "malignancy of unknown primary", and again, treatment is empirically based on past experience of the most likely origin.

== Therapy ==
Treatment or palliative care depends on the cancer. Certain disorders (such as ALL or AML) will require immediate admission and chemotherapy. Others may be followed up with regular physical examination, medical imaging, and blood tests.

Often, surgery is attempted to remove a tumor entirely. This is only feasible when there is some degree of certainty that the tumor can in fact be removed. When it is certain that parts will remain, curative surgery is often impossible, e.g. when there are metastases, or when the tumor has invaded a structure that cannot be operated upon without risking the patient's life. Occasionally surgery can improve survival even if not all tumour tissue has been removed; the procedure is referred to as "debulking" (i.e. reducing the overall amount of tumour tissue). Surgery is also used for the palliative treatment of some cancers, e.g. to relieve biliary obstruction, or to relieve the problems associated with some cerebral tumors. The risks of surgery must be weighed against the benefits.

Chemotherapy and radiotherapy are used as a first-line radical therapy in several malignancies. They are also used for adjuvant therapy, i.e. when the macroscopic tumor has already been completely removed surgically but there is a reasonable statistical risk that it will recur. Chemotherapy and radiotherapy are commonly used for palliation, where disease is clearly incurable: in this situation the aim is to improve the quality of life and to prolong it.

Hormone manipulation is well established, particularly in the treatment of breast and prostate cancer.

Monoclonal antibody treatments are widely used in oncology, with established therapies such as Rituximab for lymphoma and Trastuzumab for HER2-positive breast cancer, alongside newer agents targeting various cancers. Cancer vaccines and other immunotherapies, such as checkpoint inhibitors, CAR-T cell therapy, and cytokine therapies, remain active areas of research and clinical application.

== Palliative care ==
Although cancers can be treated to remission with radical treatment, and for pediatric patients, that number is much higher, there may be ongoing issues with symptom control associated with progressive cancer, and also with the treatment of the disease. These problems may include pain, nausea, anorexia, fatigue, immobility, and depression. Not all issues are strictly physical: personal dignity may be affected. Moral and spiritual issues are also important.

While many of these problems fall within the remit of the oncologist, palliative care has matured into a separate, closely allied specialty to address the problems associated with advanced disease. Palliative care is an essential part of the multidisciplinary cancer care team. Recent research has found that supportive oncology services, including palliative care, social work, and dietitian support for patients with stage IV non-small-cell lung cancer remain underutilized with geographic disparities in access reported even within publicly funded healthcare systems.

== Progress and research ==
There is a tremendous amount of research being conducted, ranging from cancer cell biology, and radiation therapy to chemotherapy treatment regimens and optimal palliative care and pain relief. Next-generation sequencing and whole-genome sequencing have completely changed the understanding of cancers. Identification of novel genetic/molecular markers will change the methods of diagnosis and treatment, paving the way for personalized medicine.

Therapeutic trials often involve patients from many different hospitals in a particular region. In the UK, patients are often enrolled in large studies coordinated by Cancer Research UK (CRUK), Medical Research Council (MRC), the European Organisation for Research and Treatment of Cancer (EORTC) or the National Cancer Research Network (NCRN).

The most valued companies worldwide whose leading products are in Oncology include Pfizer (United States), Roche (Switzerland), Merck (United States), AstraZeneca (United Kingdom), Novartis (Switzerland) and Bristol-Myers Squibb (United States) who are active in the treatment areas Kinase inhibitors, Antibodies, Immuno-oncology and Radiopharmaceuticals.

== Specialties ==
- The four main divisions:
  - Clinical oncology: focuses on treatment of cancer with both systemic therapies and radiation.
  - Medical oncology: focuses on the treatment of cancer with chemotherapy, targeted therapy, immunotherapy, and hormonal therapy.
  - Radiation oncology: focuses on treatment of cancer with radiation.
  - Surgical oncology: focuses on treatment of cancer with surgery.
- Sub-specialties in oncology:
  - Adolescent and young adult (AYA) oncology.
  - Bone & Musculoskeletal oncology: focuses on cancers of bones and soft tissue.
  - Breast oncology: focuses on cancers of breast.
  - Cardiooncology (an Emerging specialty) is a branch of cardiology that addresses the cardiovascular impact of cancer and its treatments.
  - Dermatological oncology: focuses on the medical and surgical treatment of skin, hair, sweat gland, and nail cancers
  - Gastrointestinal oncology: focuses on cancers of the stomach, colon, rectum, anal canal, liver, gallbladder, pancreas.
  - Genitourinary oncology: focuses on cancers of genital and urinary system.
  - Geriatric oncology: focuses on cancers in elderly population.
  - Gynecologic oncology: focuses on cancers of the female reproductive system.
  - Head & Neck oncology: focuses on cancers of oral cavity, nasal cavity, oropharynx, hypopharynx and larynx.
  - Hemato oncology: focuses on cancers of blood and stem cell transplantation.
  - Mathematical oncology
  - Molecular oncology: focuses on molecular diagnostic methods in oncology.
  - Neuro-oncology: focuses on cancers of brain.
  - Nuclear medicine oncology: focuses on diagnosis and treatment of cancer with radiopharmaceuticals.
  - Ocular oncology: focuses on cancers of eye.
  - Pain & Palliative oncology: focuses on treatment of end stage cancer to help alleviate pain and suffering.
  - Pediatric oncology: concerned with the treatment of cancer in children.
  - Preventive oncology: focuses on epidemiology & prevention of cancer.
  - Psycho-oncology: focuses on psychosocial issues on diagnosis and treatment of cancer patients.
  - Thoracic oncology: focuses on cancers of lung, mediastinum, oesophagus and pleura.
  - Veterinary oncology: focuses on treatment of cancer in animals.

== See also ==
- Cancer research
- Comparative oncology
- Oncology nursing
- Oncometabolism
- Tumour heterogeneity
- Warburg effect (oncology)

Organizations

- American Cancer Society
- American Cancer Society Cancer Action Network
- American Cancer Society Center
- American Society of Clinical Oncology
- Canadian Cancer Society
- Cancer Research UK
- National Cancer Institute
- National Comprehensive Cancer Network
- Programme of Action for Cancer Therapy
