= Alexander Anderson (footballer) =

Scottish footballer

Personal information
- Full name: Alexander M. Anderson
- Place of birth: Scotland
- Position: Inside forward

Senior career*
Years	Team	Apps	(Gls)
1931–1932	Murrayfield Amateurs		
1932–1934	Queen's Park	60	(19)
1934–1938	Heart of Midlothian	38	(18)

International career
1931–1934	Scotland Amateurs	11	(5)
- * Club domestic league appearances and goals

Alexander M. Anderson was a Scottish amateur footballer who played in the Scottish League for Queen's Park and Heart of Midlothian as an inside forward. He was capped by Scotland at amateur level.
