= Mathematical oncology =

Use of math in the study of cancer

Mathematical oncology is the use of mathematical models and computer simulations applied to the study of cancer (oncology).

== History ==
Teorell made preliminary efforts to model in a work published 1937 because of the problem of the time a drug injected exists within the body was an unknown. Modelling by epidemiological data originated in 1954.

== Modeling ==
Modeling types:

- epidemiological data
- mechanistical: tumor growth conceptualized from conceptualization of the tumor matter as a type of mechanism
- cancer cell population evolution

Models use ordinary differential equations and partial differential equations to represent tumor growth, angiogenesis, metastasis development, and treatment responses.

== Simulations ==
Simulation of cancer behavior potentially reduces the need for early-phase experimental trials.

== Treatment/therapy ==
Researchers develop models that describe tumor dynamics, the effects of treatment, to remedy possible non-optimal treatment responses supporting the development of more effective treatment protocols.

Control theory and optimization are applied to treatment planning in cancer therapies, particularly in radiotherapy and chemotherapy. By optimizing dose schedules and timing, mathematical oncology aims to maximize therapeutic efficacy while minimizing adverse effects.

== Ecology and Evolution ==
Cancers are composed of heterogeneous cell populations that arise from a single cell of origin and diversify through the accumulation of somatic mutations, making them subject to Darwinian evolution. This clonal evolution leads to intratumor heterogeneity, in which distinct subclones coexist within the same tumor, as demonstrated by multiregion sequencing studies revealing branched evolutionary patterns where the majority of mutations are not shared across all tumor regions. However, the success of these mutant clones depends not only on their genetic traits but also on their ability to disrupt tissue homeostasis, meaning that an evolutionary view of cancer must be complemented by an ecological perspective to understand how cancer cells invade and remodel their microenvironment. Beyond competition, game theory has been applied to model cooperative interactions between tumor cell subpopulations, showing that clones can collectively acquire the hallmarks of cancer through mutualistic relationships. Ecological frameworks treat tumors as ecosystems in which cancer progression reflects a disruption of the balance between interacting cellular populations and the tumor microenvironment. These ecological and evolutionary dynamics can be exploited therapeutically, as the population-level vulnerabilities of tumors offer new strategies to drive cancer subpopulations to extinction.

== Statistical methods ==
Statistical methods can be important for understanding cancer progression, analyzing treatment outcomes, and identifying significant trends in large data sets. Advances in artificial intelligence (AI) and machine learning have further impacted the field. AI algorithms can process larger amounts of patient data and identify patterns that may predict individual responses to treatment, personalizing therapeutic strategies.

== Computational-AI ==
AI allows researchers to predict the behavior of individual cells with greater accuracy by integrating diverse types of patient data. AI-driven models can also identify mathematical equations that more precisely reflect tumor growth dynamics, helping researchers uncover relationships between various biological factors more quickly.
