= Alex Anderson =

Alex Anderson is the name of:

- Alex Anderson (cartoonist) (1920–2010), American cartoonist
- Alex Anderson (footballer) (1921–1999), Scottish footballer
- Alex Anderson (quilter) (born 1955), American quilter
- Alex Anderson (sprinter), winner of the 2006 NCAA Division I 4 × 100 meter relay championship

== See also ==
- Alexander Anderson (disambiguation)
