= Comprehensive geriatric assessment =

Medical evaluation

- Synonyms: multidimensional geriatric assessment, geriatric evaluation management and treatment, comprehensive older age assessment
- Purpose: assess health in older patients

Comprehensive geriatric assessment (CGA) is a process used by healthcare practitioners to assess the status of older people who might have frailty in order to optimize their subsequent management. These people often have complex, multiple and interdependent problems (multimorbidity) which make their care more challenging than in younger people, or those with just one medical problem. CGA is the core work of specialists in the care of older people, although many other health care practitioners either have not heard of it, or are not aware of what it actually is.

Older people who receive CGA upon admission to a hospital are more likely to be alive and be back in their own homes during their next follow-up.

== History ==
Geriatricians have focused on holistic assessments of their patients since the early days of the specialty. Dr. Marjorie Warren was the first doctor in the UK to systematically assess older people, categorizing them into those who could be got better with appropriate treatment and then discharged, and those who needed continuing (usually institutional) care. Over the past 30 years, CGA has evolved greatly, becoming much more explicit and better defined, and it has been implemented in a number of ways.

One of the first formal models was the orthogeriatrics service set up in Hastings in the 1960s. The collaboration between Devas, an orthopaedic surgeon, and Irvine, a geriatrician, laid the foundation for a template for managing orthopaedic problems in older patients with concurrent medical problems. Subsequent collaborative models between geriatricians and other specialists have been described, for example managing cancer in people who are older and frail. In acute medicine the involvement of early CGA has been shown to reduce length of stay and improve management of people over the age of 70.

== Rationale ==
Two thirds of older people have two or more long-term medical problems (multimorbidity). This makes determining the cause of any deterioration more difficult, and thus deciding the best treatment plan is also challenging, since it depends on accurately diagnosing the underlying medical problem. CGA is a systematic approach to identifying the problems that are limiting a person's ability to thrive and make the most of their life, in order to try to remedy as many of the problems as possible. The aim is to maximize quality of life.

== Assessment domains ==
- Physical health issues (e.g. heart failure, osteoarthritis)
- Mental health issues (e.g. depression, vascular dementia)
- Functional issues (e.g. unable to shower herself, or do shopping)
- Social issues (e.g. lives alone, only child lives 200 miles away)
- Environmental issues (e.g. many rugs in the house [trip risk], only heating is coal fire)

Each of these domains is assessed (where possible using validated and reliable instruments and then a list of problems is compiled in the patient's record. This potentially allows solutions to be identified for each of the identified problems. However, it is not a simple tick box exercise, but depends to some extent on the expertise of the clinicians involved.

The various members of the geriatric medicine multidisciplinary team (MDT) assess different domains. The physician (usually a geriatrician or GP) assesses physical and mental health; the pharmacist may undertake a medication review (deprescribing; the nurse assesses various aspects of personal care (for example skin integrity and continence); the physiotherapist, balance and mobility; the occupational therapist, activities of daily living; and the social worker, social aspects of the case. Other paramedical health care professionals may be involved as needed, on a case by case basis - for example a speech and language therapist if there are concerns about language or swallowing, a dietician if there are concerns about nutrition, and so on.

Usually, the MDT meet regularly to integrate the information from the various assessments in order to formulate a list of problems and potential solutions. Then, recommendations about how to proceed can be explained to the older person (and to relatives or close friends, if the person wishes) to see what their preferences are. Since the person's condition may change over time, the process is iterative, working towards a final management plan. In the case of hospital in-patients the aim is to devise a robust discharge plan.

== Benefits ==
CGA has been shown to be useful for treating people who are hospitalized, in care homes, in case management (in the U.S.), in cancer treatment for older people, and in primary care (i.e. in the general community). However there is a relative lack of geriatricians with the training and expertise to contribute to a CGA, therefore, a significant proportion of people who are older and frail and who may benefit from CGA do not have access to it.

The use of CGA improves the medical outcomes for older people. For example, people who undergo CGA upon admission to a hospital are more likely to be alive and remain in their own home (and less likely to be admitted to a nursing home) up to a year after discharge from hospital when compared with people who received standard medical treatment.

CGAs for older people with frailty who do not live in a long-term care institution could improve medication adherence, patient functioning, quality of care, and reduce the risk of unplanned hospital admissions. At the same time CGA for this demographic seems to have no impact on death or nursing home admissions.

Older people with moderate or severe frailty who are admitted to a hospital due to an unexpected emergency have an increased risk of a prolonged length of stay, death, and being discharged to a place other than their home. However, those who undergo a CGA on admission are more likely to survive and be discharged to their homes.

When used in primary care, CGA can lead to an improved adherence to medication modifications and may also have a positive effect on outcomes with respect to functional status, social activity, satisfaction with life and health, and mood.
