= Sandy Anderson (footballer) =

Scottish footballer (1930–2016)

Personal information
- Full name: Alexander Ogilvie Walker Anderson
- Date of birth: 20 February 1930
- Place of birth: Auchtermuchty, Scotland
- Date of death: July 2016 (aged 86)
- Place of death: Essex, England
- Position: Full back

Senior career*
Years	Team	Apps	(Gls)
1949–1950	Newburgh Juniors		
1950–1963	Southend United	452	(8)
1963	Folkestone Town		
Total		452	(8)
- * Club domestic league appearances and goals

Alexander Ogilvie Walker Anderson (20 February 1930 – July 2016) was a Scottish professional footballer who played in the Football League for Southend United.
