= Alexander Vass Anderson =

British Army officer (1895–1963)

Major-General Alexander Vass Anderson CB CMG MBE
- Anderson in 1947
- Born: 17 November 1895; Stonehaven, Scotland
- Died: 17 October 1963 (aged 67); St Martin, Jersey
- Military career
- Allegiance: United Kingdom
- Branch: British Army
- Service years: 1914–1949
- Rank: Major-General
- Nickname: "Sandy"
- Service number: 17247
- Unit: Royal Engineers
- Commands: Queen Victoria's Own Madras Sappers and Miners
- Conflicts: First World War; Second World War
- Awards: Companion of the Order of the Bath; Companion of the Order of St Michael and St George; Member of the Order of the British Empire; Mentioned in Despatches; Legion of Merit (United States); Officer of the Order of Orange-Nassau (Netherlands)

Major-General Alexander Vass Anderson, CB, CMG, MBE (17 November 1895 – 17 October 1963) was a senior British Army officer of the Second World War.

== Military career ==
Anderson was born in Stonehaven, Scotland, the son of Lieutenant Colonel Alexander Vass Anderson (1856–1933), of the Indian Medical Service. He attended the Royal Military Academy, Woolwich, and was commissioned into the Royal Engineers on 12 August 1914. Between 1915 and 1918 he served in the First World War, during which he was mentioned in despatches. He was promoted to captain on 3 November 1917.

In 1921, Anderson was attached to the 2nd Queen Victoria's Own Madras Sappers and Miners and saw active service in the Malabar rebellion. On 2 June 1923 he was made a Member of the Order of the British Empire for his services during the conflict. Anderson remained in India, and from 1934 to 1937 was Deputy Assistant Adjutant General for India. Between 1937 and 1939 he was Commanding Officer, Queen Victoria's Own Madras Sappers and Miners.

During the Second World War, Anderson returned to the United Kingdom where he was appointed Assistant Quarter-Master General (AQMG), Home Forces in 1940 and Colonel in charge of Administration, Home Forces until 1942. He then worked at the War Office, before serving as Deputy Quarter-Master General (DQMG), British Army Staff in Washington, D.C. In January 1945 he was invested as a Companion of the Order of the Bath. From August 1944 to April 1947, Anderson was Director of Civil Affairs at the War Office and retired with the rank of major-general in June 1949. He was awarded the Legion of Merit by the United States on 16 January 1947. The Queen of the Netherlands awarded him with a Grand Officer in the Order of Orange-Nassau with Swords by Royal Decree no. 34 of 13 February 1947.

== Personal life ==
Anderson married firstly, in 1918, Estelle Bell, daughter of George Henry Gasson, of Queenstown and East London, South Africa; the second of their three sons was the director and film critic Lindsay Anderson. He married secondly, in 1935, Aileen Elizabeth (1902–1981), daughter of Stanley James Stevenson, of Edinburgh, and widow of Major T. J. Barnes, of the 64th Pioneers. Although Lindsay Anderson's friend Gavin Lambert writes, in 'Mainly About Lindsay Anderson: A Memoir' (Faber and Faber, 2000, p. 18), that Alexander Vass Anderson 'cut (his first family) out of his life', making no reference to them in his 'Who's Who' entry, Lindsay often saw his father and looked after his house and dogs when he was away.

== Bibliography ==
- Smart, Nick (2005). Biographical Dictionary of British Generals of the Second World War. Barnesley: Pen & Sword. ISBN 1844150496.
