= Frailty index =

Index used to measure the health status of older individuals

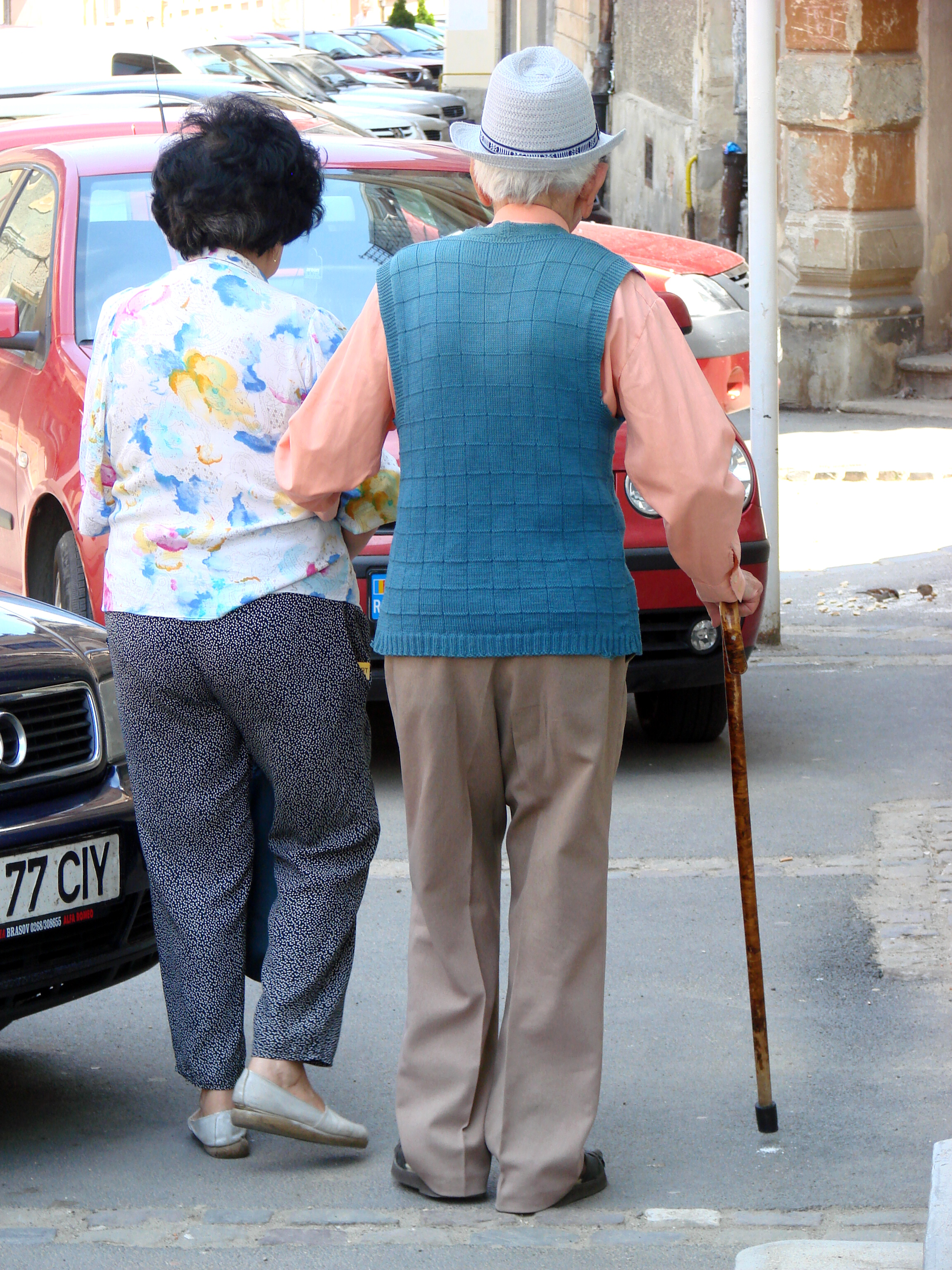
- An elderly couple out for a walk.
- Purpose: Measure health status in elderly

The frailty index (FI) can be used to measure the health status of older individuals; it serves as a proxy measure of aging and vulnerability to poor outcomes.

FI was developed by Dr. Kenneth Rockwood and Dr. Arnold Mitnitski at Dalhousie University in Canada.

FI is defined as the proportion of deficits present in an individual out of the total number of age-related health variables considered. A frailty index can be created in most secondary data sources related to health by utilizing health deficits that are routinely collected in health assessments. These deficits include diseases, signs and symptoms, laboratory abnormalities, cognitive impairments, and disabilities in activities of daily living.

Frailty Index (FI) = (number of health deficits present) ÷ (number of health deficits measured)

For example, a person with 20 of 40 deficits collected has an FI score of 20/40 = 0.5; whilst for someone with 10 deficits, the FI score is 10/40 = 0.25. The FI takes advantage of the high redundancy in the human organism. This is why it is replicable across different databases even when different items and different numbers of items are used. The standard procedure for creating a frailty index are found in an open-access publication.

There are several frailty indices, including a clinical deficits frailty index (FI-CD) and a biomarker-based frailty index (FI-B).

== See also ==
- Disability
- Physiological functional capacity
