= Drug precursors =

Substances used to manufacture illicit drugs

Drug precursors, also referred to as precursor chemicals or simply precursors, are substances used to manufacture illicit drugs. Most precursors also have legitimate commercial uses and are legally used in a wide variety of industrial processes and consumer products, such as medicines, flavourings, and fragrances.

International regulators of precursor chemicals consider it necessary to recognise and protect the legal trade of these chemicals, while at the same time preventing their diversion from such trade for use in the illegal manufacture of narcotic drugs and psychoactive substances. For example, phenylacetic acid is used legally in the production of penicillin, flavourings, perfume, and cleaning solutions, but it can also be used in the illegal manufacture of amphetamines and methamphetamine.

The international framework for precursor control is set out under Articles 12 and 13 of the 1988 United Nations Convention against Illicit Traffic in Narcotic Drugs and Psychotropic Substances, requiring UN member states to establish and enforce regulatory systems that monitor the trade in their country, as well as movement of precursor chemicals into and out of their country (e.g. transshipment). Monitoring is carried out through measures including the licensing and registration of operators, procedures and requirements governing movement of chemicals, as well as documentation, record keeping and labelling requirements.

The International Narcotics Control Board has also established tools including the Pre-Export Notification Online (PEN-Online) and Precursors Incident Communication (PICS) systems, in addition to annual information reporting through 'Form D' and the International Special Surveillance List (ISSL) for non-controlled and designer chemicals which can be used as precursors themselves for certain illicit drugs or pre-precursors, to support UN Member States in their domestic regulatory efforts and cross-border coordination. There is also harmonised legislation across Europe which puts a control system in place with the aim to achieve a balance between precursor diversion prevention without inhibiting legal trade.

== The role of East and Southeast Asia ==
The East Asia and Southeast Asia regions are referred to by many regulatory and law enforcement experts as the largest source for precursor chemicals used for illicit drug production, including by the INCB and UN Office on Drugs and Crime, in-part because a wide variety of chemicals are frequently diverted and trafficked within the region and to other parts of the world including to North America, Central and South America, Oceania (Australia and New Zealand), Europe, and Africa.

Southeast and East Asia experienced a methamphetamine epidemic beginning in the late 1990s, which peaked in 2000–2001. The region later became a global hub for methamphetamine production and trafficking.

Opium production has long been a major concern in the Golden Triangle region, especially Myanmar, but since the early 2000s production has diversified towards synthetic drug production. Countries in Southeast Asia, and particularly the Mekong region, have collectively witnessed sustained increases in seizures of methamphetamine over the last decade, totaling over 169 tons and a record of over 1.1 billion methamphetamine tablets in 2023, more than any other part of the world, with Myanmar representing one of the world's largest sources of the drug. In April and May 2020, Myanmar authorities reported Asia's largest ever drug operation in Shan State, seizing 193 million methamphetamine tablets, hundreds of kilogrammes of crystal methamphetamine as well as some heroin, and over 162,000 litres and 35.5 tons of drug precursors as well as sophisticated production equipment and several staging and storage facilities. The growth of the industry has been highlighted as potentially fueling conflict in the region.

The Golden Triangle Special Economic Zone (GTSEZ) has emerged as a key hub for the trade. The GTSEZ was founded and is chaired by sanctioned Chinese national Zhao Wei. The United Nations Office on Drugs and Crime (UNODC) has raised concerns several times about Laos being used by organized crime to traffic drugs, precursor chemicals and other illicit commodities, and that unregulated border casinos in the Mekong region including Kings Romans are being used to launder money. In early October 2020, a $50 million investment to build a port in the Laotian town of Ban Mom, directly north of the Golden Triangle Special Economic Zone, was made by Osiano Trading Sole Co., a partner or front company of Zhao Wei and his organization.

== Trafficking ==
Organized crime groups operating in East and Southeast Asia have demonstrated significant sophistication in recent years, as well as their comparative advantage when it comes to sourcing precursors and specialized non-controlled precursor and pre-precursor chemicals for the illicit manufacture of drugs. Aside from regulatory controls that are easily bypassed, Southeast Asia, and in particular the Mekong sub-region, is situated next to two of the world's leading chemical-producing countries, China and India.

However, while the chemical and pharmaceutical industries of China, and to a lesser extent India, are known to be the primary sources of the chemicals used for illicit drug production in Southeast Asia, these industries have also grown rapidly within the region itself in recent years and play an increasingly important role in the illicit drug trade. For example, between 2010 and 2018, outputs of chemicals and their products in Indonesia, Malaysia, the Philippines, Singapore, Thailand, and Vietnam, increased in value by nearly 40 per cent from US$132 billion to US$181 billion.

Regional experts have highlighted concerns regarding the use of border infrastructure to facilitate trafficking of precursors and supporting illicit industries. For example, the Ban Mom port mentioned above is located in an area confirmed to be a location used for trafficking drugs and precursor chemicals into and out of drug production areas and special regions. Laos is the key route into the Golden Triangle for precursors from China, and for the export of finished products down the Mekong, shipments of which have been seized across the region and beyond. The UNODC has also noted an increase in shipments from Myanmar via the Andaman Sea. In 2024, UNODC reported that the year prior seizures of methamphetamine reached the highest amount ever recorded for the region.

The synthetic drug market has grown rapidly due in large part to organized crime groups leveraging creative chemistry and gaps in precursor regulatory frameworks to supply both controlled and non-controlled chemicals and designer precursors to expand production.

Examples of such precursors and drugs made with them are listed below.

== Precursors ==
- 1-(2-Chloro-N-methylbenzimidoyl)cyclopentanol
  - ketamine
- 2C-H
  - 2C-x
- Acetic anhydride
  - heroin
  - methaqualone
  - phenylacetone
- N-Acetylanthranilic acid
  - methaqualone
- Anthranilic acid
  - methaqualone
- Benzaldehyde
  - amphetamine
  - phenylacetone
- Benzyl chloride
  - methamphetamine
- Benzyl cyanide
  - phenylacetone
- CBD
  - THC (see conversion of CBD to THC)
- Ephedrine and pseudoephedrine
  - methamphetamine
  - methcathinone
- Ergocristine, ergine, ergonovine, and ergotamine
  - LSD
- Ethylamine
  - ethylamphetamine
- GBL
  - GHB
- Safrole, isosafrole, and 3,4-methylenedioxyphenylpropan-2-one
  - MDMA, MDEA, MDA
- Methylamine
  - methamphetamine
- N-Methylephedrine and N-methylpseudoephedrine
  - dimethylamphetamine
- N-Phenethyl-4-piperidone (NPP)
  - fentanyl and analogues
- Nitroethane
  - amphetamine
  - MDA
  - phenylacetone
- Norpseudoephedrine and phenylpropanolamine
  - amphetamine
  - 4-methylaminorex
- Phenylacetic acid
  - phenylacetone
- Piperidine
  - phencyclidine (PCP)
- Piperonal (heliotropin)
  - MDMA, MDEA, MDA
- Propionic anhydride
  - fentanyl and analogues
- Tropinone
  - Cocaine (see biosynthesis of cocaine)

== Cofactors ==
Cofactors are helper molecules that enable enzymes to perform essential steps in drug biosynthesis.

- S-Adenosyl methionine (SAM)
  - cocaine (see biosynthesis of cocaine)

== Reagents ==
- Hydriodic acid
  - methamphetamine
- Hypophosphorous acid
  - amphetamine
  - methamphetamine
- Iodine
  - amphetamine
  - methamphetamine
- Red phosphorus and white phosphorus
  - amphetamine
  - methamphetamine
- Potassium permanganate
  - cocaine
  - methcathinone
- Sodium permanganate
  - cocaine
- Hydrochloric acid (hydrogen chloride)
  - amphetamine
  - cocaine
  - N,N-dimethylamphetamine
  - ethylamphetamine
  - fentanyl and analogues
  - heroin
  - LSD
  - MDA
  - MDE
  - MDMA
  - methamphetamine
  - methaqualone
  - methcathinone
  - phencyclidine (PCP)
- Sulfuric acid
  - amphetamine
  - cocaine
  - MDA
  - MDE
  - MDMA
  - methamphetamine
  - methaqualone
  - phenylacetone

== Solvents ==
- Acetone
  - cocaine
  - heroin
  - LSD
  - MDA
  - MDE
  - MDMA
  - methamphetamine
- Diethyl ether
  - amphetamine
  - cocaine
  - fentanyl and analogues
  - heroin
  - LSD
  - MDA
  - MDE
  - MDMA
  - methamphetamine
  - methaqualone
  - methcathinone
  - phencyclidine (PCP)
  - phenylacetone
- Methylethylketone (butanone) and methyl isobutyl ketone
  - cocaine
  - heroin
  - MDA
  - MDEA
  - methamphetamine
- Toluene
  - cocaine
  - fentanyl and analogues
  - methaqualone
  - phencyclidine (PCP)
  - phenylacetone
- Denatured Ethanol/Isopropynol
  - methamphetamine
  - cocaine
  - heroin
- Hexane
  - methamphetamine

== See also ==
- Chemical Diversion and Trafficking Act
- Clandestine chemistry
- Combat Methamphetamine Epidemic Act of 2005
- Controlled Substances Act
- DEA list of chemicals
- European law on drug precursors
- United Nations Convention Against Illicit Traffic in Narcotic Drugs and Psychotropic Substances
