= Decree-Law 15/93 =

Decree-Law n. 15/93

Government of Portugal
- Long title: The approval of the 1988 United Nations Convention against Illicit Traffic in Narcotic Drugs and Psychotropic Substances, duly signed by Portugal and ratified.
- Citation: 1993, c. 234 - 252
- Territorial extent: Portugal
- Enacted by: Ministry of Justice
- Enacted: 12 November 1992
- Assented to: 21 December 1992
- Signed by: Mário Soares
- Commenced: 22 February 1992

Amends
- Rectification n. 20/93; Decree-Law n. 81/85; Law n. 45/96; Decree-Law n. 214/2000; Law n. 30/2000; Decree-Law n. 69/2001; Law n. 101/2001; Law n. 104/2001; Decree-Law n. 323/2001; Law n. 3/2003; Law n. 47/2003; Law n. 11/2004; Law n. 17/2004; Law n. 14/2005; Law n. 48/2007; Law n. 48/2007; Law n. 59/2007; Law n. 18/2009; Law n. 38/2009; Decree-Law n. 114/2011; Law n. 13/2012; Law n. 22/2014; Law n. 77/2014; Law n. 7/2017; Law n. 8/2019

Related legislation
- Criminal Code

Summary
- Revises drug law

Keywords
- Drugs
- Status: In force

The Decree-Law 15/93 of January 22 (Portuguese: Decreto-Lei n.º 15/93, de 22 de Janeiro) is a Portuguese drug control law implementing the 1988 United Nations Convention Against Illicit Traffic in Narcotic Drugs and Psychotropic Substances. It classifies substances into six categories, Table (Portuguese: Tabela) I through Table VI. Tables I and II are each further broken down into classes: A, B, and C.

This law was also the first that created the crime of money laundering in Portuguese law, and has been amended 25 times since 1993.

The introduction of the law, which is primarily aimed at controlling drug trafficking, says that although the use of drugs is socially censurable, that "does not prevent drug addicts from being seen in the first place as persons who are in need of medical assistance" who should receive care. Thus, "drug consumers are presently legally punishable in an almost symbolic fashion" that encourages treatment. (Note: "Tal não significa, todavia, que o tocicodependente não deva ser encarado, em primeira linha, como alguém que necessita de assistência médica e que tudo deve ser feito para o tratar, por sua causa e também pela protecção devida aos restantes cidadãos. Em conformidade com tais afirmações, o consumidor de drogas é sanciondo pela lei vigente de maneira quase simbólica, procurando-se que o contacto com o sistema formal da justiça sirva para o incentivar ao tratamento, na hipótese de ter sido atingido pela toxico-dependência.")

While drug use is illegal in Portugal, the law's introduction notes of occasional drug users: "it is necessary above all to avoid them being labelled, marginalised, pushed into an impasse or towards avenues whose only way out is drugs." (Note: "Para os consumidores ocasionais, acima de tudo deseja-se a sua não etiquetagem, a não marginalização, enfim, que o seu semelhante o não empurre para becos sem saída ou que a saída acabe mesmo por ser a droga.") However, the Portuguese government condemned the Dutch pragmatic policy, well known for its absence of user punishment.

Drug trafficking is punished with very harsh sentences; in the most severe cases, it can be punished by 10 years to 25 years of imprisonment.

== Table I ==
=== Class A ===
- Diamorphine (Heroin)
- Morphine
- Opium
- 6-Monoacetylmorphine (6-MAM)
- Hydromorphone
- Pethidine
- Methadone
- Hydrocodone
- Oxycodone
- Fentanyl (and all its analogues, i.e. alphamethylfentanyl (AMF; China White), alfentanil, sufentanil, carfentanil, etc.)
- Ketobemidone
- Levorphanol
- Oxymorphone
- MPPP

=== Class B ===
- Coca in all forms and all derivatives including:
  - Cocaine or Crack cocaine
  - Ecgonine (and all derivatives of ecgonine)

=== Class C ===
- Cannabis and all derivatives in any form, including tetrahydrocannabinol, but excepting cannabinol

== Table II ==
=== Class A ===
- Hallucinogens, including:
  - 2C family
  - LSD
  - MDMA (Ecstasy)
  - Psilocin
  - Psilocybin
  - Peyote
  - Mescaline
  - Phencyclidine
- Stimulants
  - 4-Methyl-aminorex
- Sedative-hypnotics
  - gamma-Hydroxybutyrate (GHB)

=== Class B ===
- Amphetamine stimulants including:
  - Amphetamine
  - Dextroamphetamine
  - Methamphetamine and levomethamphetamine
- Tetrahydrocannabinol
- Zipeprol
- Other stimulants, including anorectics
  - Methylphenidate
  - Cathine
  - Cathinone
  - Methcathinone
  - Phendimetrazine
  - Fenethylline

=== Class C ===
- Barbiturates
  - Amobarbital
  - Butabarbital
  - Butalbital
  - Cyclobarbital
  - Pentobarbital
  - Secobarbital
- Benzodiazepines
  - Flunitrazepam
- Opioids
  - Buprenorphine
  - Codeine
  - Pentazocine
  - Propoxyphene
- Other sedative-hypnotics
  - Mecloqualone
  - Methaqualone
  - Glutethimide

== Table III ==
Table III includes special preparations which may include limited amounts of any of the controlled drugs listed under Tables I and II.

== Table IV ==
- Stimulants (mostly anorectics)
  - Amfepramone
  - Aminorex
  - Clobenzorex
  - Ethylamphetamine
  - Fencamfamine
  - Fenproporex
  - Lefetamine
  - Mefenorex
  - Mazindol
  - Pemoline
  - Pipradrol
  - Propylhexedrine
  - Pyrovalerone
- All benzodiazepines (including temazepam, but not including flunitrazepam)
- Barbiturates
  - Allobarbital
  - Barbital
  - Butobarbital
  - Methylphenobarbital
  - Phenobarbital
  - Secbutabarbital
  - Vinylbital
- Other sedative-hypnotics
  - Ethchlorvynol
  - Ethinamate
  - Methyprylon
  - Zolpidem
- Meprobamate
- Mesocarb

== Table V and VI ==
Tables V and VI comprise precursor substances (and salts thereof) which may be used to manufacture drugs listed under Tables I and II.

=== Table V ===
- N-Acetylanthranilic acid
- Ephedrine
- Ergometrine
- Ergotamine
- Isosafrole
- Lysergic acid
- 3,4-Methylenedioxyphenyl-2-propanone
- Norephedrine
- 1-Phenyl-2-propanone
- Piperonal
- Pseudoephedrine
- Safrole

=== Table VI ===
- Acetic anhydride
- Acetone
- Anthranilic acid
- Diethyl ether
- Hydrochloric acid
- Methyl ethyl ketone
- Phenylacetic acid
- Piperidine
- Potassium permanganate
- Sulfuric acid
- Toluene

== See also ==
- Drug policy
- Drug prohibition law
- Illegal drug trade
