= 3,4-Methylenedioxypropiophenone =

MDP1P
- Chemical structure of 3,4-methylenedioxypropiophenone

Names
- Preferred IUPAC name 1-(2H-1,3-Benzodioxol-5-yl)propan-1-one
- Other names 1-(Benzo[d][1,3]dioxol-5-yl)propan-1-one; 1-(1,3-Benzodioxol-5-yl)-1-propanone; 5-Propionyl-1,3-benzodioxole; MDP1P

Identifiers
| CAS Number | 28281-49-4 |
| 3D model (JSmol) | Interactive image |
| Beilstein Reference | 165729 |
| ChemSpider | 86372 |
| ECHA InfoCard | 100.044.473 |
| EC Number | 248-937-6 |
| PubChem CID | 95682 |
| UNII | 79S7K6SNO8 |
| CompTox Dashboard (EPA) | DTXSID00182532 |
- InChI: InChI=1S/C10H10O3/c1-2-8(11)7-3-4-9-10(5-7)13-6-12-9/h3-5H,2,6H2,1H3 Key: RVBJGSPBFIUTTR-UHFFFAOYSA-N
- SMILES: CCC(=O)C1=CC2=C(C=C1)OCO2

Properties
| Chemical formula | C_{10}H_{10}O_{3} |
| Molar mass | 178.187 g·mol^{−1} |
| Density | 1.21 g/mL |
| Melting point | 37 °C (99 °F; 310 K) |
| Boiling point | 291 °C |

Hazards
| Safety data sheet (SDS) | MSDS at Sigma Aldrich |
- Except where otherwise noted, data are given for materials in their standard state (at 25 °C [77 °F], 100 kPa). Infobox references

3,4-Methylenedioxypropiophenone, also known as 3,4-(methylenedioxy)phenyl-1-propanone (MDP1P), is a phenylpropanoid found in some plants of the genus Piper and is an isomer of 3,4-methylenedioxyphenyl-2-propanone (MDP2P).

== Natural occurrence ==
Studies of various chemotypes of Piper marginatum have either detected this compound to be the dominant constituent of the plant's essential oil or absent from it altogether. Of 22 samples collected from South America, specimens from the following regions had the greatest amount of the chemical by dry leaf mass: Manaus (0.35%), Melgaço (0.348%), Belterra (0.33%), Monte Alegre (0.241 to 0.266%), and Alta Floresta (0.123%).

== Uses ==
MDP1P is a can be used as a precursor in the synthesis of methylone and various other substituted methylenedioxy- phenethylamine derivatives. It can be prepared via a Grignard reaction between ethylmagnesium bromide and piperonylonitrile.

== Legal status ==
=== United States ===
MDP1P is not a scheduled drug at the federal level in the United States nor is it on the DEA list of chemicals.

==== Florida ====
"3,4-methylenedioxy-propiophenone" along with "2-Bromo-3,4-Methylenedioxypropiophenone" and "3,4-methylenedioxy-propiophenone-2-oxime" are Schedule I controlled substances in the state of Florida making them illegal to buy, sell, or possess in Florida.

== See also ==
- Substituted methylenedioxyphenethylamine § Related compounds
- MDP2P
