= Methylenedioxyphenylpropene =

Methylenedioxyphenylpropene (C_{10}H_{10}O_{2}) can refer to either:

- Isosafrole
- Safrole
