= Methylenedioxyphenylpropanone =

Methylenedioxyphenylpropanone (C_{10}H_{10}O_{3}) can refer to:

- MDP1P
- MDP2P
