= DEA list of chemicals =

The United States Drug Enforcement Administration (DEA) maintains lists regarding the classification of illicit drugs (see DEA Schedules). It also maintains List I of chemicals and List II of chemicals, which contain chemicals that are used to manufacture the controlled substances/illicit drugs. The list is designated within the Controlled Substances Act but can be modified by the U.S. Attorney General as illegal manufacturing practices change.

Although the list is controlled by the Attorney General, the list is considered a DEA list because the DEA publishes and enforces the list.

Suppliers of these products are subject to regulation and control measures:

| Regulation | List I | List II | Tableting and Encapsulating Machines | Special Surveillance List |
|---|---|---|---|---|
| Know your customer | X | X | X | X |
| Annual manufacturing, inventory, and use reports for bulk manufacturers | X | X | X | |
| 15 day advanced DEA notice required for imports, exports, and transshipments | X | X | | |
| 15 day advanced DEA notice required for international transactions | X | X | | |
| Keep transaction records for at least two years | X | X | | |
| Maintain effective security controls | X | X | | |
| Required reporting for unusual sales and losses or sales to DEA-identified companies | X | X | | |
| Registration required for manufacturing, distribution, import, or export | X | | | |
| Reports of mail-order sales to non-regulated entities | X | | | |

== List I chemicals ==
These chemicals are designated as those that are used in the manufacture of the controlled substances and are important to the manufacture of the substances:

| Chemical | Illicit drug |
|---|---|
| Alpha-phenylacetoacetonitrile and its salts, optical isomers, and salts of optical isomers (APAAN) | phenylacetone, methamphetamine, amphetamine |
| Anthranilic acid, its esters, and its salts | methaqualone and analogues |
| Benzyl cyanide | phenylacetic acid, phenylacetone, amphetamine |
| Ephedrine, its salts, optical isomers, and salts of optical isomers | methamphetamine |
| Ergonovine and its salts | lysergic acid diethylamide |
| Ergotamine and its salts | lysergic acid diethylamide |
| N-Acetylanthranilic acid, its esters, and its salts | methaqualone |
| Norpseudoephedrine, its salts, optical isomers, and salts of optical isomers | amphetamine |
| Phenylacetic acid, its esters, and its salts | phenylacetone, amphetamine, methamphetamine |
| Phenylpropanolamine, its salts, optical isomers, and salts of optical isomers | amphetamine, methamphetamine |
| Piperidine and its salts | phencyclidine and analogues |
| Pseudoephedrine, its salts, optical isomers, and salts of optical isomers | methamphetamine |
| 3,4-Methylenedioxyphenyl-2-propanone | MDMA, MDA, MDEA, MDOH |
| Methylamine and its salts | methamphetamine |
| Ethylamine and its salts | etilamfetamine |
| Propionic anhydride | fentanyl |
| Isosafrole | MDMA, MDA |
| Safrole | MDMA, MDA |
| Piperonal | MDMA, MDA |
| N-Methylephedrine, its salts, optical isomers, and salts of optical isomers | methamphetamine |
| N-Methylpseudoephedrine, its salts, optical isomers, and salts of optical isomers | methamphetamine |
| Hydroiodic acid | methamphetamine, amphetamine |
| Benzaldehyde | methamphetamine, amphetamine |
| Nitroethane | methamphetamine, amphetamine |
| Gamma butyrolactone (other names include: GBL; dihydro-2(3H)-furanone; 1,2-butanolide; 1,4-butanolide; 4-hydroxybutanoic acid lactone; gamma-hydroxybutyric acid lactone) | Gamma-Hydroxybutyric acid (GHB) |
| Red phosphorus | methamphetamine, amphetamine |
| White phosphorus (other names: yellow phosphorus) | methamphetamine, amphetamine |
| Hypophosphorous acid and its salts (including ammonium hypophosphite, calcium hypophosphite, iron hypophosphite, potassium hypophosphite, manganese hypophosphite, magnesium hypophosphite and sodium hypophosphite) | methamphetamine, amphetamine |
| N-Phenethyl-4-piperidone (NPP) | fentanyl |
| Iodine | methamphetamine, amphetamine |
| Ergocristine and its salts | lysergic acid diethylamide |
| N-(1-benzylpiperidin-4-yl)-N-phenylpropionamide (benzylfentanyl) and its salts | fentanyl |
| N-phenylpiperidin-4-amine(4-anilinopiperidine; N-phenyl-4-piperidinamine; 4-AP), its amides, its carbamates, and its salts | fentanyl |
| 3,4-MDP-2-P methyl glycidate (PMK glycidate) and its optical and geometric isomers | MDMA and other "ecstasy"-type substances |
| 3,4-MDP-2-P methyl glycidic acid (PMK glycidic acid) and its salts, optical and geometric isomers, and salts of isomers | MDMA and other "ecstasy"-type substances |
| Alpha-phenylacetoacetamide (APAA) and its optical isomers | amphetamine, methamphetamine |
| Methyl alpha-phenylacetoacetate (MAPA; methyl 3-oxo-2-phenylbutanoate) and its optical isomers | phenylacetone, methamphetamine, amphetamine |
| 4-Piperidone | fentanyl |
| 1-boc-4-AP (tert-butyl 4-(phenylamino)piperidine-1-carboxylate) and its salts | fentanyl |

== List II chemicals ==
These chemicals are designated as those that are used in the manufacture of controlled substances:

1. Acetic anhydride
2. Acetone
3. Benzyl chloride
4. Diethyl ether
5. Potassium permanganate
6. 2-Butanone (or methyl ethyl ketone or MEK)
7. Toluene
8. Hydrochloric acid (including anhydrous hydrogen chloride)
9. Sulfuric acid
10. Methyl isobutyl ketone (MIBK)
11. Sodium permanganate

== Special Surveillance List ==
=== Chemicals ===
All listed chemicals as specified in 21 CFR 1310.02 (a) or (b). This includes supplements which contain a listed chemical, regardless of their dosage form or packaging and regardless of whether the chemical mixture, drug product or dietary supplement is exempt from regulatory controls. For each chemical, its illicit manufacturing use is given in parentheses. Some Special Surveillance List chemicals do not have an exclusive manufacturing use for a specific illicit drug but rather have a broad range of uses in both legitimate and illicit manufacturing operations.

| Chemical | Illicit drug |
|---|---|
| Phenyl-2-nitropropene | substituted amphetamines |
| 1-(4-bromophenyl)propan-1-one | substituted cathinones and substituted amphetamines |
| 1-(4-chlorophenyl)propan-1-one | substituted cathinones and substituted amphetamines |
| 1-(4-methylphenyl)propan-1-one | substituted cathinones and substituted amphetamines |
| Carbonyldiimidazole | LSD |
| 1,1-Dichloro-1-fluoroethane | solvent |
| N-benzyl-4-piperidone | fentanyl |
| chloroephedrine | methamphetamine |
| Butyrophenone | substituted cathinones |
| Valerophenone | substituted cathinones |
| Propiophenone | substituted cathinones |
| 2C-H | 2C-x and DOx |
| 2-bromo-1-(4-chlorophenyl)propan-1-one | substituted cathinones and substituted amphetamines |
| 2-bromo-1-(4-methoxyphenyl)propan-1-one | substituted cathinones and substituted amphetamines |
| 2-bromo-1-(4-methylphenyl)propan-1-one | substituted cathinones and substituted amphetamines |
| 2-bromo-1-phenylpentan-1-one | substituted cathinones and substituted amphetamines |
| 2-bromo-1-phenylpropan-1-one | substituted cathinones and substituted amphetamines |
| BMK glycidic acid and esters | methamphetamine |
| 3-oxo-2-phenylbutanoic acid and its esters | methamphetamine |
| 3,4-methylenedioxyphenyl-2-nitropropene (MDP2NP) | MDMA |
| Ammonia gas | amphetamine, methamphetamine |
| Ammonium formate | amphetamine, methamphetamine |
| Azobisisobutyronitrile | radical initiator |
| Bromobenzene | phencyclidine |
| 1,4-Butanediol | GHB and Gamma-Butyrolactone |
| Cyclohexanone | phencyclidine |
| Diethylamine and its salts | lysergic acid diethylamide |
| ethyl 3-oxo-4-phenylbutanoate | phenylacetone |
| ethyl-3-(1,3-benzodioxol-5-yl)-2-methyloxirane-2-carboxylate (MDP2P ethyl glycidate) | MDMA |
| Formamide | amphetamine, methamphetamine |
| Formic acid | amphetamine, methamphetamine |
| Lithium aluminum hydride | amphetamine, methamphetamine |
| Lithium metal | amphetamine, methamphetamine |
| Magnesium metal (turnings) | phencyclidine |
| Mercuric chloride | amphetamine, methamphetamine |
| methyl 2-(1,3-benzodioxol-5-yl)-3-oxobutanoate | MDMA |
| N-Methylformamide | amphetamine, methamphetamine |
| Organomagnesium halides (Grignard reagents) (e.g. ethylmagnesium bromide and phenylmagnesium bromide) | phencyclidine |
| ortho-Toluidine | methaqualone |
| 2-Phenylethyl bromide | fentanyl |
Phenylethanolamine and its salts
| Phosphorus pentachloride | lysergic acid diethylamide |
| Potassium dichromate | general-purpose oxidizing agent |
| Pyridine and its salts | general-purpose solvent |
| Sodium borohydride | reducing agent |
| Sodium dichromate | general-purpose oxidizing agent |
| Sodium metal | phenylacetone |
| Sodium triacetoxyborohydride | reducing agent |
| para-fluoro-1-boc-4-anilopiperidine | parafluorofentanyl |
| Thioglycolic acid | modafinil |
| Thionyl chloride | lysergic acid diethylamide |
Trichloromonofluoromethane (aka freon-11, carrene-2)
1,1,2-Trichloro-1,2,2-trifluoroethane (aka freon 113)

=== Equipment ===
The equipment list:

- 22-liter heating mantles
- Encapsulating machines
- Hydrogenators
- Tableting machines, including punches and dies

== See also ==
- Chemical Diversion and Trafficking Act
- Combat Methamphetamine Epidemic Act of 2005
- Drug precursors
- European law on drug precursors
