= Chemical Diversion and Trafficking Act =

US law

- Other short titles: Alcoholic Beverage Labeling Act of 1988; Alcohol and Drug Traffic Safety Act of 1988; Anti-Drug Abuse Act of 1988; Asset Forfeiture Amendments Act of 1988; Bureau of Land Management Drug Enforcement Supplemental Authority Act; Child Protection and Obscenity Enforcement Act of 1988; Comprehensive Alcohol Abuse, Drug Abuse, and Mental Health Amendments Act of 1988; Drug-Free Public Housing Act of 1988; Drug-Free Workplace Act of 1988; Drunk Driving Prevention Act of 1988; Federal Aviation Administration Drug Enforcement Assistance Act of 1988; Insular Areas Drug Abuse Amendments of 1988; International Narcotics Control Act of 1988; Justice Department Organized Crime and Drug Enforcement Enhancement Act of 1988; Juvenile Justice and Delinquency Prevention Amendments of 1988; Minor and Technical Criminal Law Amendments Act of 1988; Money Laundering Prosecution Improvements Act of 1988; National Commission on Measured Responses to Achieve a Drug-Free America by 1995 Authorization Act; National Narcotics Leadership Act of 1988; Native Hawaiian Health Care Act of 1988; Public Housing Drug Elimination Act of 1988; Truck and Bus Safety and Regulatory Reform Act of 1988; Uniform Federal Crime Reporting Act of 1988; Urgent Supplemental Appropriations Act of 1989
- Long title: An Act to prevent the manufacturing, distribution, and use of illegal drugs, and for other purposes.
- Acronyms (colloquial): CDTA, ADAAA
- Nicknames: Anti-Drug Abuse Amendments Act of 1988
- Enacted by: the 100th United States Congress
- Effective: November 18, 1988

Citations
- Public law: 100-690
- Statutes at Large: 102 Stat. 4181 aka 102 Stat. 4312

Codification
- Titles amended: 21 U.S.C.: Food and Drugs
- U.S.C. sections created: 21 U.S.C. ch. 13, subch. I § 801; 21 U.S.C. ch. 13, subch. I § 830; 21 U.S.C. ch. 13, subch. II § 971

Legislative history
- Introduced in the House as H.R. 5210 by Thomas Foley (D–WA) on August 11, 1988; Committee consideration by House Banking, Finance, and Urban Affairs, House Education and Labor, House Foreign Affairs, House Government Operations, House Energy and Commerce, House Interior and Insular Affairs, House Judiciary, House Merchant Marine and Fisheries, House Public Works and Transportation, House Ways and Means; Passed the House on September 22, 1988 (375-30); Passed the Senate on October 14, 1988 (87-3, in lieu of S. 2852) with amendment; House agreed to Senate amendment on October 22, 1988 (346-11) with further amendment; Senate agreed to House amendment on October 22, 1988 (agreed voice vote); Signed into law by President Ronald Reagan on November 18, 1988

The Chemical Diversion and Trafficking Act of 1988 was an amendment to the Controlled Substances Act to regulate precursor chemicals, essential chemicals, tableting machines, and encapsulating machines by imposing record keeping and import/export reporting requirements on transactions involving these materials. Prior to these restrictions being put in place, the U.S. had been the primary source of chemicals used in South American cocaine manufacture. According to the DEA, the Act sharply reduced these precursor exports and cocaine manufacturers responded by purchasing from chemical suppliers outside the U.S. The U.S. in turn successfully lobbied for inclusion of chemical controls in the 1988 United Nations Convention Against Illicit Traffic in Narcotic Drugs and Psychotropic Substances, which included two Tables of controlled precursors.

== Provisions of the Act ==
=== Short Title ===
The subtitle is cited as the Chemical Diversion and Trafficking Act of 1988.

==== Regulation of Listed Chemicals and Certain Machines ====
Controlled Substances Act is amended —

(a) (1) Each regulated person who engages in a regulated transaction involving a listed chemical, a tableting machine, or an encapsulating machine shall keep a record of the transaction —

(A) For 4 years after the date of the transaction, if the listed chemical is a precursor chemical or if the transaction involves a tableting machine or an encapsulating machine.
(B) For 2 years after the date of the transaction, if the listed chemical is an essential chemical.

(2) A record shall be retrievable and shall include the date of the regulated transaction, the identity of each party to the regulated transaction, a statement of the quantity and form of the listed chemical, a description of the tableting machine or encapsulating machine, and a description of the method of transfer. Such record shall be available for inspection and copying by the Attorney General.
(3) It is the duty of each regulated person who engages in a regulated transaction to identify each other party to the transaction. It is the duty of such other party to present proof of identity to the regulated person. The Attorney General shall specify by regulation the types of documents and other evidence that constitute proof of identity for purposes of this Act.

(b) Each regulated person shall report to the Attorney General, in such form and manner as the Attorney General shall prescribe by regulation —

(1) any regulated transaction involving an extraordinary quantity of a listed chemical, an uncommon method of payment or delivery, or any other circumstance that the regulated person believes may indicate that the listed chemical will be used in violation of this title
(2) any proposed regulated transaction with a person whose description or other identifying characteristic the Attorney General furnishes in advance to the regulated person
(3) any unusual or excessive loss or disappearance of a listed chemical under the control of the regulated person
(4) any regulated transaction in a tableting machine or an encapsulating machine

Each report shall be made at the earliest practicable opportunity after the regulated person becomes aware of the circumstance involved. A regulated person may not complete a transaction with a person whose description or identifying characteristic is furnished to the regulated person unless the transaction is approved by the Attorney General. The Attorney General shall make available to regulated persons guidance documents describing transactions and circumstances for which reports are required by this Act.

(c) (1) Except as provided, any information obtained by the Attorney General under this section which is exempt from disclosure under Title 5, United States Code, by reason of such title, is confidential and may not be disclosed to any person.

(2) Information referred to a regulated transaction involving a listed chemical, a tableting machine, or an encapsulating machine may be disclosed only —

(A) To an officer or employee of the United States engaged in carrying out this title, Title III, or the customs laws
(B) When relevant in any investigation or proceeding for the enforcement of this title, Title III, or the customs laws
(C) when necessary to comply with an obligation of the United States under a treaty or other international agreement
(D) to a State or local official or employee in conjunction with the enforcement of controlled substances laws or precursor chemical laws.

(3) The Attorney General shall —

(A) take such action as may be necessary to prevent unauthorized disclosure of information by any person to whom such information is disclosed under this Act
(B) issue guidelines that limit, to the maximum extent feasible, the disclosure of proprietary business information, including the names or identities of United States exporters of listed chemicals, to any person to whom such information is disclosed under this Act

(4) Any person who is aggrieved by a disclosure of information in violation of this section may bring a civil action against the violator for appropriate relief.
(5) Notwithstanding, a civil action may not be brought against investigative or law enforcement personnel of the Drug Enforcement Administration

==== Notification, Suspension of Shipment, and Penalties with Respect to Importation and Exportation of Listed Chemicals ====
(a) IN GENERAL — Controlled Substances Import and Export Act is amended

(a) Each regulated person who imports or exports a listed chemical shall notify the Attorney General of the importation or exportation not later than 15 days before the transaction is to take place.

(b) (1) Attorney General shall provide by regulation for circumstances in which the requirement does not apply to a transaction between a regulated person and a regular customer or regular supplier of the regulated person. At the time of any importation or exportation constituting a transaction referred to in the preceding sentence, the regulated person shall notify the Attorney General of the transaction.

(2) Regulations under this subsection shall provide that the initial notification with respect to a customer or supplier of a regulated person shall, upon the expiration of the 15-day period, qualify the customer as a regular customer or regular supplier, unless the Attorney General otherwise notifies the regulated person in writing.

(c) (1) Attorney General may order the suspension of any Commerce and importation or exportation of a listed chemical or may disqualify any regular customer or regular supplier on the ground that the chemical may be diverted to the clandestine manufacture of a controlled substance. From and after the time when the Attorney General provides written notice of the order (including a statement of the legal and factual basis for the order) to the regulated person, the regulated person may not carry out the transaction.

(2) Upon written request to the Attorney General, a regulated person to whom an order applies is entitled to an agency hearing on the record in accordance with subchapter II of chapter 5 of Title 5, United States Code. The hearing shall be held on an expedited basis and not later than 45 days after the request is made, except that the hearing may be held at a later time, if so requested by the regulated person.

(b) EFFECTIVE DATES AND SPECIAL RULES —

(1) Not later than 45, days after the date of the enactment of this Act, the Attorney General shall forward to the Director of the Office of Management and Budget proposed regulations required by the amendment.
(2) Not later than 55 days after the date of the enactment of this Act, the Director of the Office of Management and Budget shall —

(A) review such proposed regulations of the Attorney General
(B) forward any comments and recommendations for modifications to the Attorney General.

(3) Not later than 60 days after the date of the enactment of this Act, the Attorney General shall publish the proposed final regulations required by the amendment.
(4) Not later than 120 days after the date of the enactment of this Act, the Attorney General shall promulgate final regulations required by the amendment.
(5) Section 1018 of the Controlled Substances Import and Export Act shall take effect 90 days after the promulgation of the final regulations.
(6) Each regulated person shall provide to the Attorney General the identity of any regular customer or regular supplier of the regulated person not later than 30 days after the promulgation of the final regulations. Not later than 60 days after the end of such 30-day period, each regular customer and regular supplier so identified shall be a regular customer or regular supplier for purposes of any applicable exception from the requirement unless the Attorney General otherwise notifies the regulated person in writing.

(c) PENALTY FOR IMPORTATION OR EXPORTATION —

Controlled Substances Import and Export Act is amended —

(d) Any person who knowingly or intentionally —

(1) imports or exports a listed chemical with intent to manufacture a controlled substance in violation of this title or, in the case of an exportation, in violation of the law of the country to which the chemical is exported.
(2) imports or exports a listed chemical knowing, or having reasonable cause to believe, that the listed chemical will be used to manufacture a controlled substance in violation of this title or, in the case of an exportation, in violation of the law of the country to which the chemical is exported shall be fined in accordance with Title 18, United States Code, or imprisoned not more than 10 years, or both.

==== Definitions ====
Controlled Substances Act is amended —

The term 'listed precursor chemical' means a chemical specified by regulation of the Attorney General as a chemical that is used in manufacturing a controlled substance in violation of this title and is critical to the creation of the controlled substances, and such term includes (until otherwise specified by regulation of the Attorney General, as considered appropriate by the Attorney General or upon petition to the Attorney General by any person) the following:

(A) Anthranilic acid and its salts
(B) Benzyl cyanide
(C) Ephedrine, its salts, optical isomers, and salts of optical isomers
(D) Ergonovine and its salts
(E) Ergotamine and its salts
(F) N-Acetylanthranilic acid and its salts
(G) Norpseudoephedrine, its salts, optical isomers, and salts of optical isomers
(H) Phenylacetic acid and its salts
(I) Phenylpropanolamine, its salts, optical isomers, and salts of optical isomers
(J) Piperidine and its salts
(K) Pseudoephedrine, its salts, optical isomers, and salts of optical isomers
(L) 3,4-Methylenedioxyphenyl-2-propanone

The term 'listed essential chemical' means a chemical specified by regulation of the Attorney General as a chemical that is used as a solvent, reagent, or catalyst in manufacturing a controlled substance in violation of this title, and such term includes (until otherwise specified by regulation of the Attorney General, as considered appropriate by the Attorney General or upon petition to the Attorney General by any person) the following chemicals:

(A) Acetic anhydride
(B) Acetone
(C) Benzyl chloride
(D) Ethyl ether
(E) Hydriodic acid
(F) Potassium permanganate
(G) 2-Butanone
(H) Toluene

The term 'regular customer' means, with respect to a regulated person, a customer with whom the regulated person has an established business relationship that is reported to the Attorney General.

The term 'regular supplier' means, with respect to a regulated person, a supplier with whom the regulated person has an established business relationship that is reported to the Attorney General.

The term 'regulated person' means a person who manufactures, distributes, imports, or exports a listed chemical, a tableting machine, or an encapsulating machine.

The term 'regulated transaction' means —

(A) a distribution, receipt, sale, importation or exportation of a threshold amount, including a cumulative threshold amount for multiple transactions (as determined by the Attorney General, in consultation with the chemical industry and taking into consideration the quantities normally used for lawful purposes), of a listed chemical, except that such term does not include —

(I) a domestic lawful distribution in the usual course of business between agents or employees of a single regulated person
(II) a delivery of a listed chemical to or by a common or contract carrier for carriage in the lawful and usual course of the business of the common or contract carrier, or to or by a warehouseman for storage in the lawful and usual course of the business of the warehouseman, except that if the carriage or storage is in connection with the distribution, importation, or exportation of a listed chemical to a third person, this clause does not relieve a distributor, importer, or exporter from compliance with section 310.
(III) any category of transaction specified by regulation of the Attorney General (as excluded from this definition as unnecessary for enforcement of this title or Title III)
(IV) any transaction in a listed chemical that is contained in a drug that may be marketed or distributed lawfully in the United States under the Federal Food, Drug, and Cosmetic Act
(V) any transaction in a chemical mixture

(B) a distribution, importation, or exportation of a tableting machine or encapsulating machine

The term 'chemical mixture' means a combination of two or more chemical substances, at least one of which is not a listed precursor chemical or a listed essential chemical, except that such term does not include any combination of a listed precursor chemical or a listed essential chemical with another chemical that is present solely as an impurity.

==== Chemical Diversion Control Program ====
Controlled Substances Act is amended —

The Attorney General shall maintain an active program, both domestic and international, to curtail the diversion of precursor chemicals and essential chemicals used in the illicit manufacture of controlled substances.

== See also ==
- Anti-Drug Abuse Act of 1988
- Aviation Drug-Trafficking Control Act of 1984
- DEA list of chemicals, a/k/a the DEA Watched Chemical List
- Drug precursors
