= Phenylacetones =

Class of organic chemical compounds

Phenylacetones are a group of organic compounds containing a phenyl moiety and an acetone moiety bonded together, the archetypal example being phenylacetone.

Phenylacetones often play a role in the illicit synthesis of amphetamine and its analogues, 3,4-methylenedioxyphenyl-2-propanone (MDP2P) for example being used in the production of 3,4-methylenedioxyamphetamine (MDA), 3,4-methylenedioxymethamphetamine (MDMA), 3,4-methylenedioxy-N-ethylamphetamine (MDEA), and other homologues.
