= European law on drug precursors =

European law on illicit drug precursors:

- Regulation (EC) No 273/2004 of the European Parliament and of the Council of 11 February 2004 on drug precursors (contains list of substances)
- Council Regulation (EC) No 111/2005 of 22 December 2004 laying down rules for the monitoring of trade between the Union and third countries in drug precursors. Consolidated text (2021) (contains the same list of substances)
- Commission Regulation (EC) No 297/2009 of 8 April 2009 amending Regulation (EC) No 1277/2005 laying down implementing rules for Regulation (EC) No 273/2004 of the European Parliament and of the Council on drug precursors and for Council Regulation (EC) No 111/2005 laying down rules for the monitoring of trade between the Community and third countries in drug precursors

The list of 23 substances is identical to list of UN-controlled drug precursors, except for the different categorization and inclusion of stereoisomers in EU Category 1.

== List of substances ==
=== Category 1 Precursors ===
- phenylacetone
- methyl 2-phenylacetoacetate (MAPA)
- methyl 2-methyl-3-phenyloxirane-2-carboxylate (BMK methyl glycidate)
- 2-methyl-3-phenyloxirane-2-carboxylic acid (BMK glycidic acid)
- N-acetylanthranilic acid
- alpha-phenylacetoacetamide (APAA)
- alpha-phenylacetoacetonitrile (APAAN)
- isosafrole (cis + trans)
- 3,4-methylenedioxyphenylpropan-2-one
- piperonal
- safrole
- methyl 3-(1,3-benzodioxol-5-yl)-2-methyloxirane-2-carboxylate (PMK methyl glycidate)
- 3-(1,3-benzodioxol-5-yl)-2-methyloxirane-2-carboxylic acid (PMK glycidic acid)
- 4-anilino-N-phenethylpiperidine (ANPP)
- N-phenethyl-4-piperidone (NPP)
- ephedrine
- chloroephedrine
- pseudoephedrine
- chloropseudoephedrine
- norephedrine
- ergometrine
- ergotamine
- lysergic acid

The stereoisomeric forms of the substances listed in this Category not being cathine, whenever the existence of such forms is possible.

The salts of the substances listed in this Category whenever the existence of such salts is possible and not being the salts of cathine.

=== Category 2 Precursors ===
- red phosphorus
- acetic anhydride
- phenylacetic acid
- anthranilic acid
- piperidine
- potassium permanganate

The salts of the substances listed in this Category whenever the existence of such salts is possible.

=== Category 3 Precursors ===
- hydrochloric acid (hydrogen chloride)
- sulphuric acid
- toluene
- diethyl ether
- acetone
- methylethylketone

The salts of the substances listed in this Category whenever the existence of such salts is possible and not being the salts of hydrochloric acid and sulphuric acid.

=== Category 4 Precursors ===
- Medicinal products and veterinary medicinal products containing ephedrine or its salts
- Medicinal products and veterinary medicinal products containing pseudo-ephedrine or its salts

== See also ==
- List of UN-controlled drug precursors
- List of US-controlled drug precursors
- Drug precursors
- European Council decisions on designer drugs
- European Monitoring Centre for Drugs and Drug Addiction
