= Council of the European Union decisions on designer drugs =

EU committee

Council of the European Union decisions on designer drugs. Council of the European Union issued a set of decisions on 7 designer drugs to make them subject to control measures and criminal provisions.

== List of substances ==
- paramethoxymethamphetamine (PMMA)
- 2C-I
- 2C-T-2
- 2C-T-7
- 2,4,5-trimethoxyamphetamine (TMA-2)
- benzylpiperazine (BZP)
- mephedrone (4-MMC)

== Decisions ==
Decisions based on Joint Action 97/396/JHA of 16 June 1997 adopted by the Council on the basis of Article K.3 of the Treaty on European Union, concerning the information exchange, risk assessment and the control of new synthetic drugs:

- Council Decision 2002/188/JHA of 28 February 2002 concerning control measures and criminal sanctions in respect of the new synthetic drug PMMA
- Council Decision 2003/847/JHA of 27 November 2003 concerning control measures and criminal sanctions in respect of the new synthetic drugs 2C-I, 2C-T-2, 2C-T-7 and TMA-2

Decisions based on Council Decision 2005/387/JHA of 10 May 2005 on the information exchange, risk-assessment and control of new psychoactive substances:

- Council Decision 2008/206/JHA of 3 March 2008 on defining 1-benzylpiperazine (BZP) as a new psychoactive substance which is to be made subject to control measures and criminal provisions
- Council Decision 2010/759/EU of 2 December 2010 on submitting 4-methylmethcathinone (mephedrone) to control measures

== Sources ==
- European Monitoring Centre for Drugs and Drug Addiction | Legal topic overviews: Classification of controlled drugs – The EU system

== See also ==
- Designer drugs
- Recreational drug use
- Single Convention on Narcotic Drugs
- Convention on Psychotropic Substances
- European law on drug precursors
- European Monitoring Centre for Drugs and Drug Addiction
