= 4-Hydroxyphenylacetone =

Names
- Preferred IUPAC name 1-(4-Hydroxyphenyl)propan-2-one
- Other names p-Hydroxyphenylacetone; para-Hydroxyphenylacetone

Identifiers
CAS Number	770-39-8
3D model (JSmol)	Interactive image
ChemSpider	5382241
ECHA InfoCard	100.129.975
PubChem CID	7019274
UNII	7K79N2OO7F
CompTox Dashboard (EPA)	DTXSID40427095
- InChI: InChI=1S/C9H10O2/c1-7(10)6-8-2-4-9(11)5-3-8/h2-5,11H,6H2,1H3 Key: VWMVAQHMFFZQGD-UHFFFAOYSA-N
- SMILES: CC(=O)CC1=CC=C(C=C1)O

Properties
Chemical formula	C_{9}H_{10}O_{2}
Molar mass	150.177 g·mol^{−1}
- Except where otherwise noted, data are given for materials in their standard state (at 25 °C [77 °F], 100 kPa). Infobox references

4-Hydroxyphenylacetone is the para-hydroxy analog of phenylacetone, an inactive metabolite of amphetamine in humans. When it occurs as a metabolite of amphetamine, it is produced directly from the inactive metabolite phenylacetone.

Metabolic pathways of amphetamine in humans
In humans, 4-hydroxyphenylacetone occurs as a metabolite of amphetamine and phenylacetone.
