= Ammonium phosphinate =

Names
- Other names Ammonium hypophosphite

Identifiers
CAS Number	7803-65-8
3D model (JSmol)	Interactive image
ChemSpider	29342364
ECHA InfoCard	100.029.333
EC Number	232-266-0
UNII	15A8J678A2
CompTox Dashboard (EPA)	DTXSID20884440
- InChI: InChI=1S/H3N.H3O2P/c;1-3-2/h1H3;3H2,(H,1,2) Key: AQQVTZBWWYVEGR-UHFFFAOYSA-N
- SMILES: [PH2](=O)O.N

Properties
Chemical formula	H_{6}NO_{2}P
Molar mass	83.027 g·mol^{−1}
Appearance	colorless crystals
Density	1.634 g/cm^{3}
Melting point	200
Solubility in water	soluble

Hazards
- GHS labelling
Pictograms	(GHS07: Exclamation mark)
Signal word	Warning
Hazard statements	H315, H319, H335
Precautionary statements	P261, P305, P338, P351
- Except where otherwise noted, data are given for materials in their standard state (at 25 °C [77 °F], 100 kPa). Infobox references

Ammonium phosphinate is a chemical compound with the chemical formula NH_{4}PH_{2}O_{2}. This is a salt of ammonium and phosphinic acid.

== Synthesis ==
Synthesis of ammonium phosphinate may be achieved by the effect of ammonia solution on phosphinic acid solution:

HPH_{2}O_{2} + NH_{3} → NH_{4}PH_{2}O_{2}

== Physical properties ==
Ammonium phosphonate forms colorless crystals of the orthorhombic system, space group Cmma, cell parameters a = 0.757 nm, b = 1.147 nm, c = 0.398 nm, Z = 4.

The compound is soluble in water and ethanol, but insoluble in acetone.

== Uses ==
The compound is usually used as a catalyst for the production of polyamide.
