= United Nations Convention Against Illicit Traffic in Narcotic Drugs and Psychotropic Substances =

Drug control treaty

- Parties to the convention Parties Territories of Parties where the treaty is not applied Non-parties
- Signed: From December 20, 1988
- Location: Vienna
- Effective: November 11, 1990
- Condition: 20 ratifications
- Signatories: 87
- Parties: 191
- Depositary: Secretary-General of the United Nations
- Languages: Arabic, Chinese, English, French, Russian and Spanish

Full text
- United Nations Convention Against Illicit Traffic in Narcotic Drugs and Psychotropic Substances at Wikisource

The United Nations Convention Against Illicit Traffic in Narcotic Drugs and Psychotropic Substances of 1988 is one of three major drug control treaties currently in force. It provides additional legal mechanisms for enforcing the 1961 Single Convention on Narcotic Drugs and the 1971 Convention on Psychotropic Substances. The Convention entered into force on November 11, 1990. As of June 2020, there are 191 Parties to the convention. These include 186 out of 193 United Nations member states (not Equatorial Guinea, Kiribati, Papua New Guinea, Solomon Islands, Somalia, South Sudan, or Tuvalu) and the Holy See, the European Union, the Cook Islands, Niue, and the State of Palestine.

== Background ==
The 1988 Convention was introduced following the political and sociological developments in the 1970s and 1980s. The growing demand for cannabis, cocaine, and heroin for recreational purposes, mostly in the developed world, triggered an increase of illicit production in geographical areas where cannabis, coca, and opium had been traditionally cultivated. With the rising size of the illicit drug trade, international drug trafficking became a multibillion-dollar business dominated by criminal groups, providing grounds for the creation of the 1988 Convention and the consequential escalation of the war on drugs.

The Preamble notes that previous enforcement efforts have not stopped drug use, warning of "steadily increasing inroads into various social groups made by illicit traffic in narcotic drugs and psychotropic substances." It cautions that the drug trade and related activities "undermine the legitimate economies and threaten the stability, security and sovereignty of States." The sense of urgency is underscored by the image of innocent boys and girls being exploited:

[C]hildren are used in many parts of the world as an illicit drug consumers market and for purposes of illicit production, distribution and trade in narcotic drugs and psychotropic substances, which entails a danger of incalculable gravity.

== Drug manufacture and distribution ==
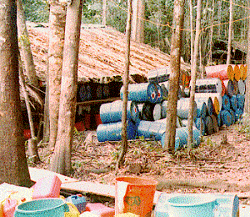
A cache of precursor chemicals near a South American cocaine processing lab

Much of the treaty is devoted to fighting organized crime by mandating cooperation in tracing and seizing drug-related assets. Article 5 of the Convention requires its parties to confiscate proceeds from drug offenses. It also requires parties to empower its courts or other competent authorities to order that bank, financial, or commercial records be made available or seized. The Convention further states that a party may not decline to act on this provision on the ground of bank secrecy.

Article 6 of the Convention provides a legal basis for extradition in drug-related cases among countries having no other extradition treaties. In addition, the Convention requires the parties to provide mutual legal assistance to one another upon request, for purposes of searches, seizures, service of judicial documents, and so on.

In addition, Article 12 of the Convention establishes two categories of controlled illicit drug precursor substances, Table I and Table II. The Commission on Narcotic Drugs has power to decide whether to control a precursor substance, and which Table to place it in. The assessment of the International Narcotics Control Board is binding on the commission, however, as to scientific matters. A two-thirds vote is required to add a substance to a Table.

Article 12 protects the interests of pharmaceutical and chemical companies by requiring the Board to take into account the "extent, importance and diversity of the licit use of the substance, and the possibility and ease of using alternate substances both for licit purposes and for the illicit manufacture of narcotic drugs or psychotropic substances."

Control of amphetamine-type stimulant precursors has become a major UN priority.

== Drug possession ==
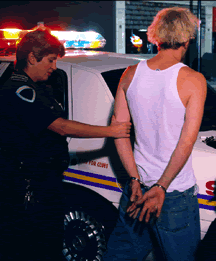
The International Narcotics Control Board interprets the 1988 Convention as requiring Parties to criminalize simple drug possession.

Article 3 of the Convention may require nations to ban possession of drugs for personal use:

Subject to its constitutional principles and the basic concepts of its legal system, each Party shall adopt such measures as may be necessary to establish as a criminal offence under its domestic law, when committed intentionally, the possession, purchase or cultivation of narcotic drugs or psychotropic substances for personal consumption contrary to the provisions of the 1961 Convention, the 1961 Convention as amended or the 1971 Convention.

Previous drug control treaties had targeted drug manufacturers and traffickers, rather than users. In their 2003 article, "The Mechanics and Dynamics of the UN System for International Drug Control," David Bewley-Taylor and Cindy Fazey explain that "[t]he 1988 Convention was an attempt to reach a political balance between consumer and producer countries. Consequently, it was not only the duty of producing countries (e.g. the developing countries of Asia and South America) to suppress illicit supply, but also the duty of consumer countries (e.g. the industrialized countries of Europe and North America) to suppress the demand for drugs."

However, it is unclear whether this provision actually does mandate prohibition of drug possession for personal use, due to the caveat that such possession need only be prohibited if it is "contrary to the provisions of the 1961 Convention, the 1961 Convention as amended or the 1971 Convention." The American National Commission on Marijuana and Drug Abuse found that the provisions of the 1961 Single Convention on Narcotic Drugs against possession apply only to possession related to illicit trafficking, while the Canadian Le Dain Commission of Inquiry into the Non-Medical Use of Drugs found otherwise.

== Constitutional issues ==
Several of the convention's provisions are prefaced with the words, "Subject to its constitutional principles and the basic concepts of its legal system, each Party shall ..." According to Fazey, "This has been used by the USA not to implement part of article 3 of the 1988 Convention." Similarly, if a national prohibition on drug possession violated a nation's constitution, those provisions would not be binding on that country.

== Proposed repeal ==
In 2003, a European Parliament committee recommended repealing the 1988 Convention, finding that:

[D]espite massive deployment of police and other resources to implement the UN Conventions, production and consumption of, and trafficking in, prohibited substances have increased exponentially over the past 30 years, representing what can only be described as a failure, which the police and judicial authorities also recognise as such ... [T]he policy of prohibiting drugs, based on the UN Conventions of 1961, 1971 and 1988, is the true cause of the increasing damage that the production of, trafficking in, and sale and use of illegal substances are inflicting on whole sectors of society, on the economy and on public institutions, eroding the health, freedom and life of individuals.

The road to repeal would be difficult. Individual nations could withdraw from the treaty under the provisions of Article 30. However, as former UN drug official Cindy Fazey notes, the convention has no termination clause, and therefore would remain in effect even if only one signatory remained. The Transnational Radical Party report noted that denunciation is the only route to changing the control regime established by the treaty:

As regards the 1988 Convention, written with the main objective of strengthening all aspects of prohibition (also at the level of consumption, establishing the reversal of the burden of proof for persons suspected of carrying forbidden substances), it was deemed not amendable, therefore, the only possible way to go about it would be its denunciation by a substantial number of contracting Parties.

== List of controlled drug precursors ==
Source: INCB Red List (14th Edition, January 2015)

The list of 23 substances is identical to list of EU-controlled drug precursors, except for the different categorization and inclusion of stereoisomers in EU Category 1.

=== Table I ===
- acetic anhydride
- N-Acetylanthranilic acid
- ephedrine
- ergometrine
- ergotamine
- isosafrole
- lysergic acid
- 3,4-methylenedioxyphenyl-2-propanone
- norephedrine
- phenylacetic acid
- 1-phenyl-2-propanone
- alpha-phenylacetoacetonitrile (APAAN)
- piperonal
- potassium permanganate
- pseudoephedrine
- safrole

The salts of the substances listed in this Table whenever the existence of such salts is possible.

=== Table II ===
- acetone
- anthranilic acid
- diethyl ether
- hydrochloric acid (hydrogen chloride)
- methyl ethyl ketone
- piperidine
- sulphuric acid
- toluene

The salts of the substances listed in this Table whenever the existence of such salts is possible.

The salts of hydrochloric acid and sulphuric acid are specifically excluded from Table II.

=== See also ===
- List of UN-controlled narcotic drugs
- List of UN-controlled psychotropic substances
- List of EU-controlled drug precursors
- List of US-controlled drug precursors

== See also ==
- Single Convention on Narcotic Drugs of 1961
- Convention on Psychotropic Substances of 1971
