= Hydroiodic acid =

Aqueous solution of hydrogen iodide

Space-filling model of hydrogen iodide
Space-filling model of water
The iodide anion
Space-filling model of the hydronium cation

Names
- Other names: Aqueous hydrogen iodide; Hydriodic acid; Hydrogen iodide, hydrous; Hydronium iodide

Identifiers
| CAS Number | 10034-85-2 |
| 3D model (JSmol) | Interactive image |
| ChEBI | CHEBI:43451 |
| ChemSpider | 23224 |
| EC Number | 233-109-9 |
| PubChem CID | 24841 |
| RTECS number | MW3760000 |
| UNII | 694C0EFT9Q |
- InChI: InChI=1S/BrH/h1H Key: CPELXLSAUQHCOX-UHFFFAOYSA-N; InChI=1/BrH/h1H Key: CPELXLSAUQHCOX-UHFFFAOYAZ
- SMILES: [OH3+].[I-]

Properties
| Chemical formula | HI(aq) |
| Molar mass | 127.912 g·mol^{−1} (HI) |
| Appearance | colorless liquid when pure, darkens on exposure to oxygen |
| Odor | acrid |
| Density | 1.70 g/mL, azeotrope (57% HI by weight) |
| Boiling point | 127 °C (261 °F; 400 K) 1.03 bar, azeotrope |
| Solubility in water | Aqueous solution |
| Acidity (pK_{a}) | −9.3 (HI) |

Hazards
- GHS labelling
| Pictograms | (GHS05: Corrosive) |
| Signal word | Danger |
| Hazard statements | H314 |
| Precautionary statements | P260, P264, P280, P301+P330+P331, P303+P361+P353, P304+P340, P305+P351+P338, P310, P321, P363, P405, P501 |
| NFPA 704 (fire diamond) | 3 0 0 ACID |
| Flash point | Non-flammable |

Related compounds
| Other anions | Hydrofluoric acid; Hydrochloric acid; Hydrobromic acid |
| Related compounds | Hydrogen iodide |
- Except where otherwise noted, data are given for materials in their standard state (at 25 °C [77 °F], 100 kPa). Infobox references

Hydroiodic acid (or hydriodic acid) is a colorless aqueous solution of hydrogen iodide. It is a strong acid, in which hydrogen iodide is ionized completely into hydronium and iodide. Concentrated aqueous solutions of hydrogen iodide are usually 48% to 57% HI by mass.

== Reactions ==
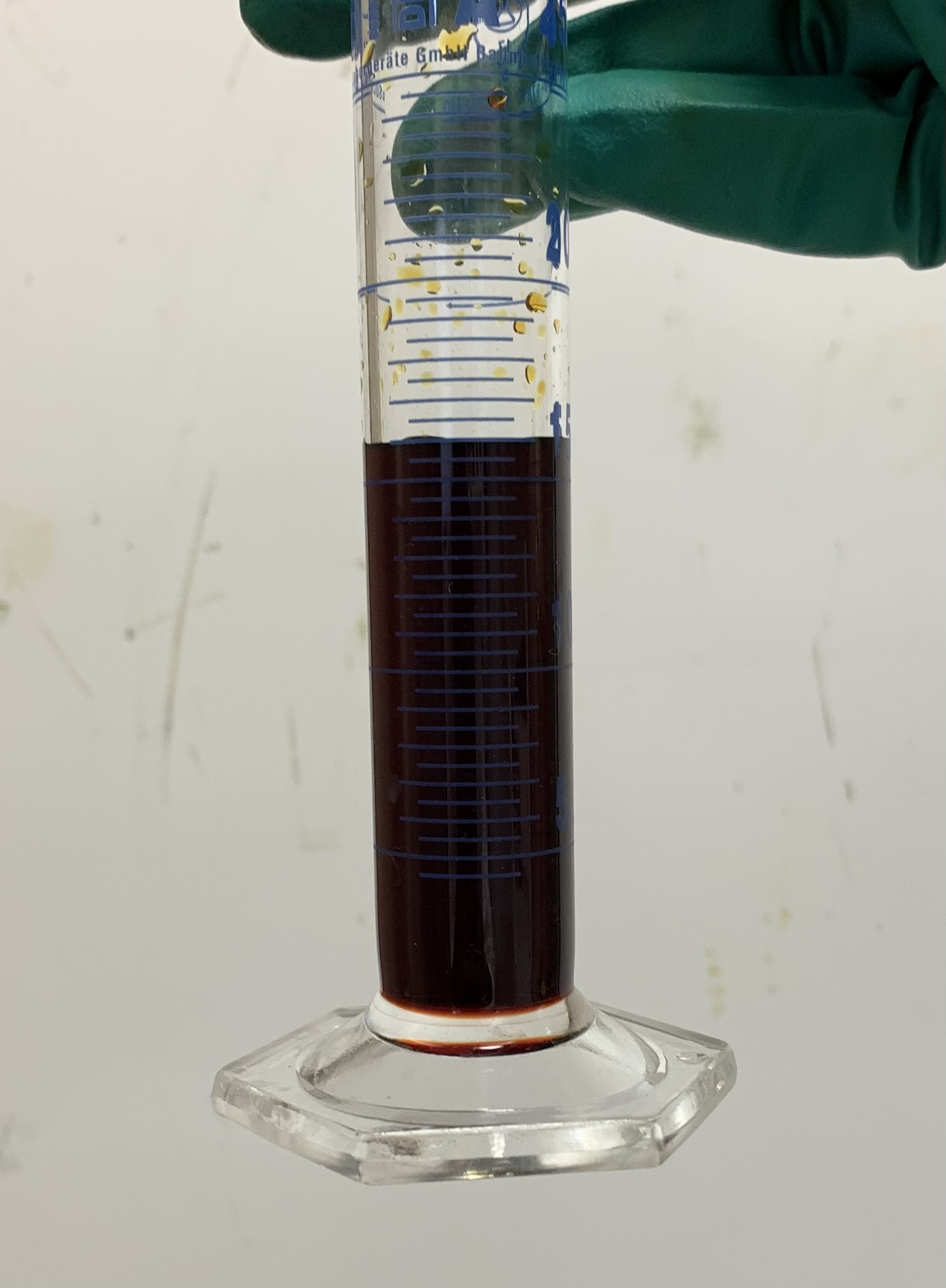
Although hydroiodic acid is colorless, aged samples often appear dark owing to the oxidation of iodide.

Hydroiodic acid reacts with oxygen in air to give iodine:

4 HI(aq) + O_{2} → 2 H_{2}O + 2 I_{2}

Like hydrogen halides, hydroiodic acid adds to alkenes to give alkyl iodides. It can also be used as a reducing agent, for example in the reduction of aromatic nitro compounds to anilines.

=== Cativa process ===
The Cativa process is a major end use of hydroiodic acid, which serves as a co-catalyst for the production of acetic acid by the carbonylation of methanol.

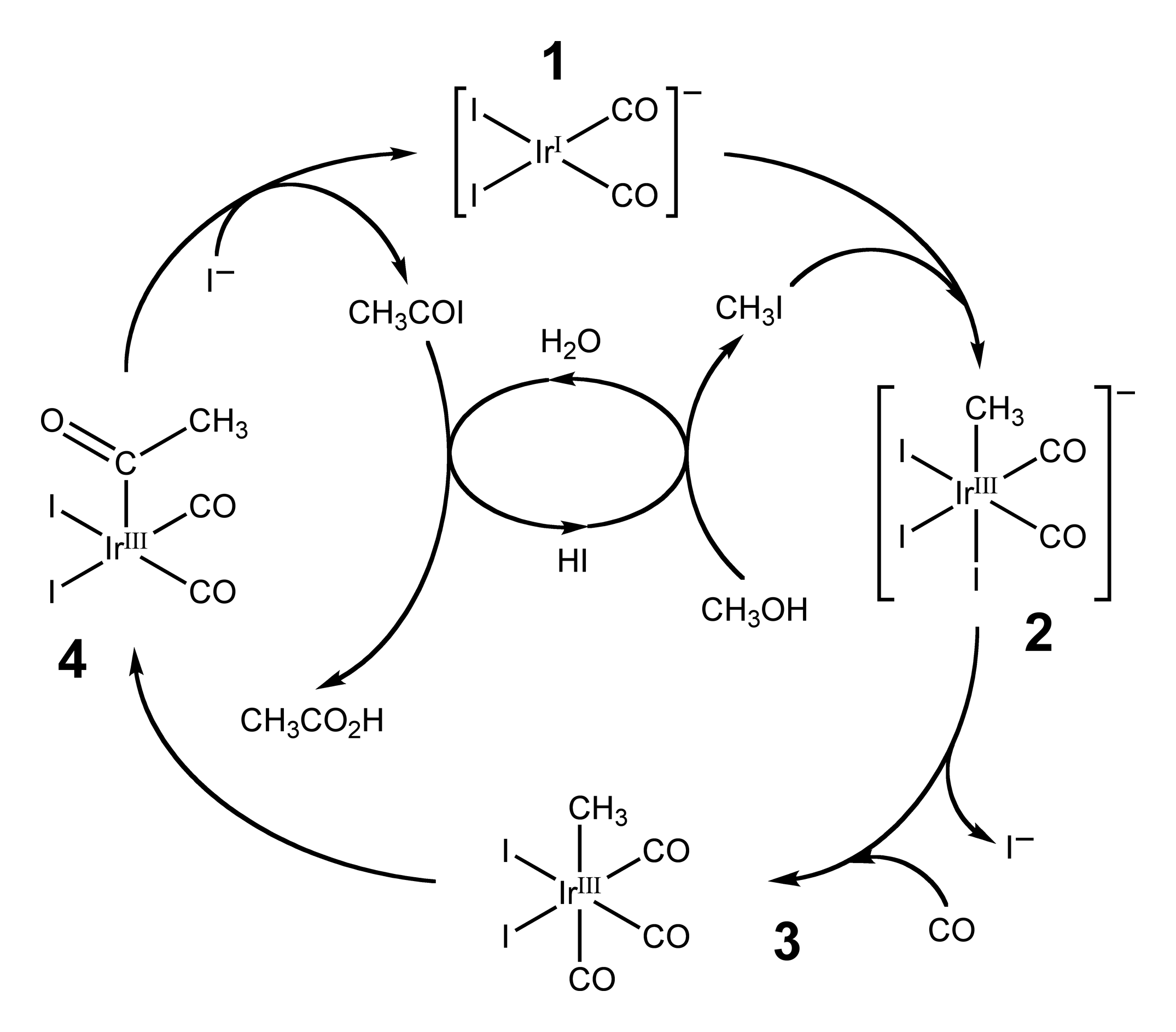
The catalytic cycle of the Cativa process

=== Illicit uses ===
Hydroiodic acid is listed as a U.S. Federal DEA List I Chemical, as it is used alongside red phosphorus to form a reducing agent used for the production of methamphetamine from over-the-counter ephedrine or pseudoephedrine pills.
