= 3,4-Methylenedioxyphenylpropan-2-one =

MDP2P

Names
- Preferred IUPAC name 1-(2H-1,3-Benzodioxol-5-yl)propan-2-one
- Other names 3,4-methylenedioxyphenyl-2-propanone 1-(1,3-benzodioxol-5-yl)propan-2-one piperonyl methyl ketone 3,4-methylenedioxyphenylacetone

Identifiers
CAS Number	4676-39-5
3D model (JSmol)	Interactive image
Abbreviations	MDP2P, PMK
ChemSpider	70776
ECHA InfoCard	100.022.843
PubChem CID	78407
UNII	PNA80F81BT
CompTox Dashboard (EPA)	DTXSID40196936
- InChI: InChI=1S/C10H10O3/c1-7(11)4-8-2-3-9-10(5-8)13-6-12-9/h2-3,5H,4,6H2,1H3 Key: XIYKRJLTYKUWAM-UHFFFAOYSA-N; InChI=1/C10H10O3/c1-7(11)4-8-2-3-9-10(5-8)13-6-12-9/h2-3,5H,4,6H2,1H3 Key: XIYKRJLTYKUWAM-UHFFFAOYAA
- SMILES: O=C(C)Cc1ccc2OCOc2c1

Properties
Chemical formula	C_{10}H_{10}O_{3}
Molar mass	178.185 g/mol
Appearance	Yellowish green liquid (when impure)
Density	1.211 g/cm^{3}
Boiling point	290 °C (554 °F; 563 K)

Pharmacology
Legal status	BR: Class D1 (Drug precursors); US: List I (a precursor); UN: Precursors Table I; EU: Category 1 Precursor
- Except where otherwise noted, data are given for materials in their standard state (at 25 °C [77 °F], 100 kPa). verify (what is ?) Infobox references

3,4-Methylenedioxyphenylpropan-2-one or piperonyl methyl ketone (MDP2P or PMK) is a chemical compound consisting of a phenylacetone moiety substituted with a methylenedioxy functional group. It is commonly synthesized from either safrole or its isomer isosafrole via oxidation using the Wacker oxidation or peroxyacid oxidation methods.

MDP2P is a precursor in the chemical synthesis of the methylenedioxyphenethylamine (MDxx) class of compounds, the classic example of which is 3,4-methylenedioxy-N-methylamphetamine (MDMA), and is also an intermediate between the MDxx family and their slightly more distant precursor safrole or isosafrole. On account of its relation to the MDxx chemical class, MDP2P, as well as safrole and isosafrole, are in the United States (U.S.) Drug Enforcement Administration (DEA) List I of Chemicals of the Controlled Substances Act (CSA) via the Chemical Diversion and Trafficking Act (CDTA). It is also considered a category 1 precursor in the European Union.

== See also ==
- Substituted methylenedioxyphenethylamine § Related compounds
- MDP1P
- Isosafrole
- Phenylacetone
- Safrole
