= Ethylmagnesium bromide =

Identifiers
CAS Number	925-90-6
3D model (JSmol)	Interactive image
ChemSpider	10254342
ECHA InfoCard	100.011.935
PubChem CID	101914
UNII	5564378HK3
CompTox Dashboard (EPA)	DTXSID80275976
- InChI: InChI=1S/C2H5.BrH.Mg/c1-2;;/h1H2,2H3;1H;/q;;+1/p-1 Key: TWTWFMUQSOFTRN-UHFFFAOYSA-M; InChI=1/C2H5.BrH.Mg/c1-2;;/h1H2,2H3;1H;/q;;+1/p-1/rC2H5BrMg/c1-2-4-3/h2H2,1H3 Key: TWTWFMUQSOFTRN-QJSJVVHYAJ
- SMILES: Br[Mg]CC

Properties
Chemical formula	CH_{3}CH_{2}MgBr
Molar mass	133.271 g·mol^{−1}

Hazards
Safety data sheet (SDS)	Oxford MSDS
- Except where otherwise noted, data are given for materials in their standard state (at 25 °C [77 °F], 100 kPa). verify (what is ?) Infobox references

Ethylmagnesium bromide is a Grignard reagent with formula CH_{3}CH_{2}MgBr, often abbreviated to EtMgBr, where Et is ethyl group. It is widely used in the laboratory synthesis of organic compounds.

== Reactions ==
Apart from acting as the synthetic equivalent of an ethyl anion synthon for nucleophilic addition, ethylmagnesium bromide may be used as a strong base to deprotonate various substrates such as alkynes:

RC≡CH + EtMgBr → RC≡CMgBr + EtH

In this application, ethylmagnesium bromide has been supplanted by the wide availability of organolithium reagents.

== Preparation ==
Ethylmagnesium bromide is commercially available, usually as a solution in diethyl ether or tetrahydrofuran. It may be prepared in the normal manner of Grignard reagents — by reacting bromoethane with magnesium in diethyl ether:

EtBr + Mg → EtMgBr
