= Precursor (chemistry) =

Compound that participates in a chemical reaction that produces another compound

In chemistry, a precursor is a compound that participates in a chemical reaction that produces another compound.

In biochemistry, the term "precursor" often refers more specifically to a chemical compound preceding another in a metabolic pathway, such as a protein precursor.

== Illicit drug precursors ==
In 1988, the United Nations Convention Against Illicit Traffic in Narcotic Drugs and Psychotropic Substances introduced detailed provisions and requirements relating the control of precursors used to produce drugs of abuse.

In Europe the Regulation (EC) No. 273/2004 of the European Parliament and of the Council on drug precursors was adopted on 11 February 2004. (European law on drug precursors)

== Illicit explosives precursors ==
On January 15, 2013, the Regulation (EU) No. 98/2013 of the European Parliament and of the Council on the marketing and use of explosives precursors was adopted. The Regulation harmonises rules across Europe on the making available, introduction, possession and use, of certain substances or mixtures that could be misused for the illicit manufacture of explosives.

== Detection ==
A portable, advanced sensor based on infrared spectroscopy in a hollow fiber matched to a silicon-micromachined fast gas chromatography column can analyze illegal stimulants and precursors with nanogram-level sensitivity.

Raman spectroscopy has been successfully tested to detect explosives and their precursors.

Technologies able to detect precursors in the environment could contribute to an early location of sites where illegal substances (both explosives and drugs of abuse) are produced.

== See also ==
- Binary chemical weapon
- Chemical synthesis
- DEA list of chemicals
- Derivative (chemistry)
- Educt, a reagent or reactant
- Metabolism#Anabolism
- Monoamine precursor
- Prodrug
- Protein precursor
