= Piperonal =

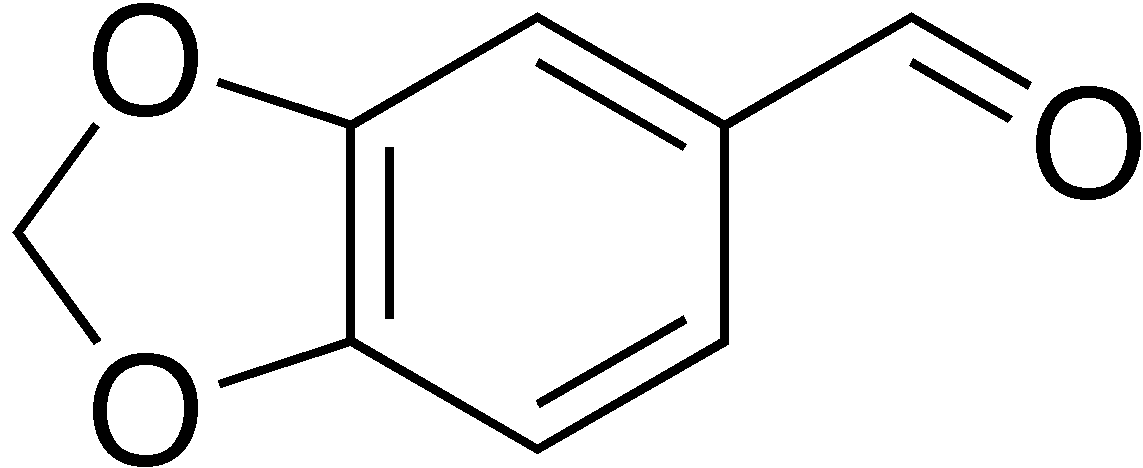

Names
- Preferred IUPAC name 2H-1,3-Benzodioxole-5-carbaldehyde
- Other names Heliotropin; Heliotropine; Piperonyl aldehyde; Protocatechuic aldehyde methylene ether; 3,4-methylenedioxybenzaldehyde;

Identifiers
| CAS Number | 120-57-0 |
| 3D model (JSmol) | Interactive image; Interactive image |
| Beilstein Reference | 131691 |
| ChEBI | CHEBI:8240 |
| ChEMBL | ChEMBL271663 |
| ChemSpider | 13859497 |
| ECHA InfoCard | 100.004.009 |
| EC Number | 204-409-7 |
| Gmelin Reference | 4186 |
| KEGG | C10812 |
| PubChem CID | 8438 |
| UNII | KE109YAK00 |
| CompTox Dashboard (EPA) | DTXSID7025924 |
- InChI: InChI=1S/C8H6O3/c9-4-6-1-2-7-8(3-6)11-5-10-7/h1-4H,5H2 Key: SATCULPHIDQDRE-UHFFFAOYSA-N
- SMILES: O=Cc1ccc2OCOc2c1; c1cc2c(cc1C=O)OCO2

Properties
| Chemical formula | C_{8}H_{6}O_{3} |
| Molar mass | 150.133 g·mol^{−1} |
| Appearance | Colorless crystals |
| Density | 1.337 g/cm^{3} |
| Melting point | 37 °C (99 °F; 310 K) |
| Boiling point | 263 °C (505 °F; 536 K) |
| Solubility in water | Soluble in 500 parts - |

Hazards
- GHS labelling
| Pictograms | (GHS07: Exclamation mark) |
| Signal word | Warning |
| Hazard statements | H317 |
| Precautionary statements | P261, P272, P280, P302+P352, P321, P333+P313, P363, P501 |
- Lethal dose or concentration (LD, LC)
| LD_{50} (median dose) | 2700 mg/kg (orally in rats) |
| Legal status | BR: Class D1 (Drug precursors); US: List I (a precursor); EU: Category 1 Precursor |
- Except where otherwise noted, data are given for materials in their standard state (at 25 °C [77 °F], 100 kPa). verify (what is ?) Infobox references

Piperonal, also known as heliotropin, is an organic compound which is commonly found in fragrances and flavors. The molecule is structurally related to other aromatic aldehydes such as benzaldehyde and vanillin. The methylenedioxyphenyl group is found in other fragrances.

== Natural occurrence ==
Piperonal naturally occurs in various plants. Examples include dill, violet flowers, and black pepper.

== Preparation ==
Piperonal can be prepared by the oxidative cleavage of isosafrole or by using a multistep sequence from catechol or 1,2-methylenedioxybenzene. Synthesis from the latter chemical is accomplished through a condensation reaction with glyoxylic acid followed by cleaving the resulting α-hydroxy acid with an oxidizing agent. Synthesis from catechol requires an additional step, Williamson ether synthesis using dichloromethane.

== Reactions ==
Piperonal, like all aldehydes, can be reduced to its alcohol (piperonyl alcohol) or oxidized to give its acid (piperonylic acid).

Piperonal can be used in the synthesis of some pharmaceutical drugs including tadalafil, L-DOPA, and atrasentan.

== Fragrance ==
Piperonal has a floral odor which is commonly described as being similar to that of vanillin or cherry. For this reason it is commonly used in fragrances. The compound was named heliotropin after the 'cherry pie' notes found in the heliotrope flower's fragrance (even though the chemical is not present in the flower's true aroma). Perfumers began to use the fragrance for the first time by the early 1880s. It is commonly used to add vanilla or almond nuances, generally imparting balsamic, powdery, and floral aspects to a scent's character.

== Flavoring usage ==
Piperonal is commonly used in creation of flavors. It is commonly used to add hay-like, floral and powdery notes to a wide range of food preparations. It is used heavily in French vanilla flavors, in part as a replacement for coumarin which is no longer GRAS. Piperonal is used in a wide and diverse range of flavors.

Piperonal can be reduced to form piperonyl alcohol which can form esters with aliphatic acids. Several of these esters, including piperonyl acetate and piperonyl isobutyrate are also used in flavorings to provide floral, fruity notes.

== Use in MDMA production ==
Due to their role in the production of MDMA, safrole, isosafrole, and piperonal are Category I precursors under regulation no. 273/2004 of the European Community.
