= Safrole =

Chemical compound

- Skeletal formula of safrole

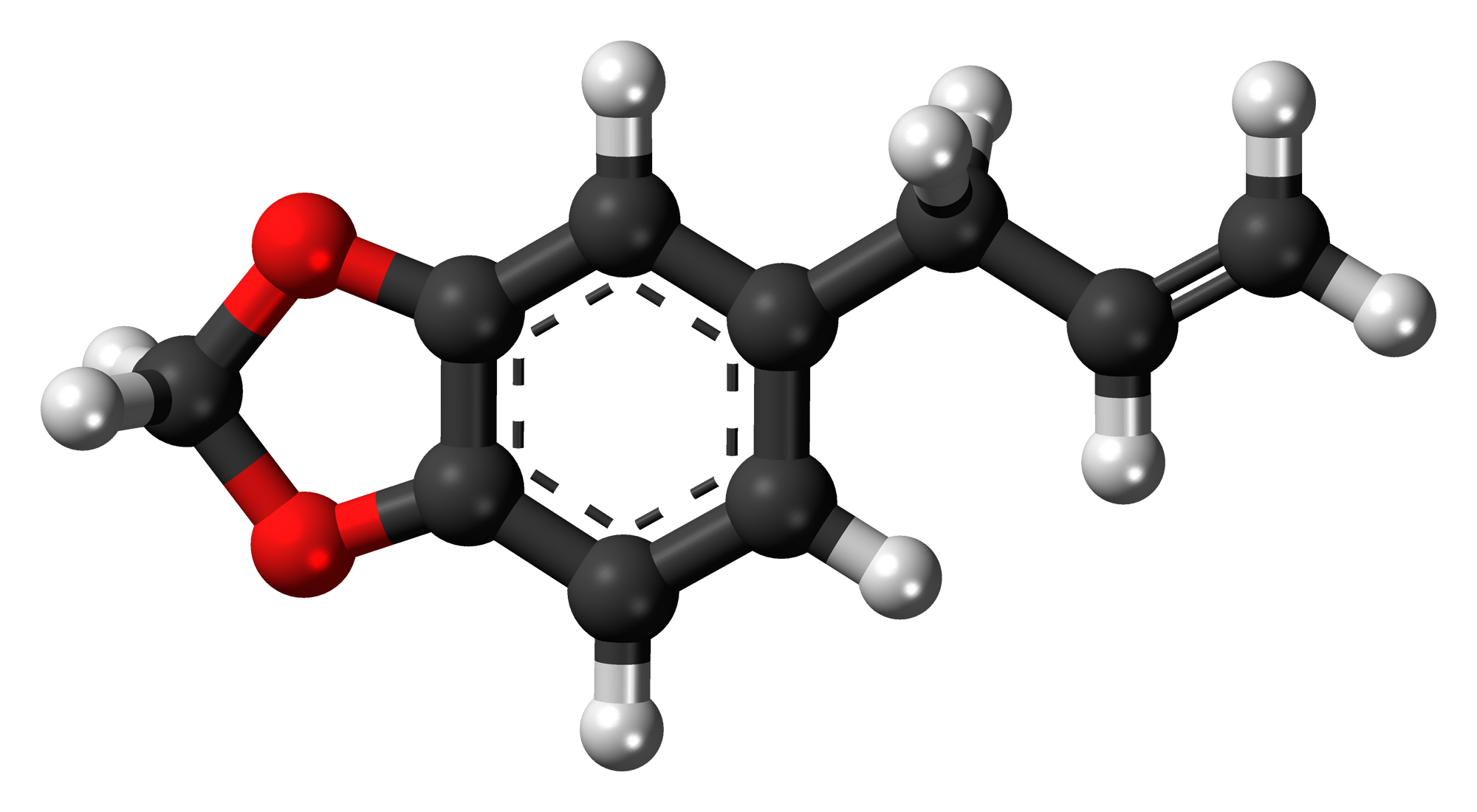
- Ball-and-stick model of safrole

Names
- Preferred IUPAC name 5-(Prop-2-en-1-yl)-2H-1,3-benzodioxole
- Other names 5-(2-Propenyl)-1,3-benzodioxole; 5-Allylbenzo[d][1,3]dioxole; 3,4-Methylenedioxyphenyl-2-propene

Identifiers
CAS Number	94-59-7
3D model (JSmol)	Interactive image
ChEBI	CHEBI:8994
ChEMBL	ChEMBL242273
ChemSpider	13848731
ECHA InfoCard	100.002.133
EC Number	202-345-4
KEGG	C10490
PubChem CID	5144
RTECS number	CY2800000
UNII	RSB34337V9
UN number	3082
CompTox Dashboard (EPA)	DTXSID0021254
- InChI: InChI=1S/C10H10O2/c1-2-3-8-4-5-9-10(6-8)12-7-11-9/h2,4-6H,1,3,7H2 Key: ZMQAAUBTXCXRIC-UHFFFAOYSA-N; InChI=1/C10H10O2/c1-2-3-8-4-5-9-10(6-8)12-7-11-9/h2,4-6H,1,3,7H2 Key: ZMQAAUBTXCXRIC-UHFFFAOYAD
- SMILES: C=CCc1ccc2OCOc2c1

Properties
Chemical formula	C_{10}H_{10}O_{2}
Molar mass	162.188 g·mol^{−1}
Appearance	colorless oil
Density	1.096 g/cm^{3}
Melting point	11 °C (52 °F; 284 K)
Boiling point	232 to 234 °C (450 to 453 °F; 505 to 507 K)
Magnetic susceptibility (χ)	−97.5×10^{−6} cm^{3}/mol

Hazards
- GHS labelling
Pictograms	(GHS07: Exclamation mark) (GHS08: Health hazard)
Signal word	Danger
Hazard statements	H302, H341, H350
Precautionary statements	P201, P281, P308+P313
Legal status	BR: Class D1 (Drug precursors); US: List I (a precursor); UN: Precursors Table I; EU: Category 1 Precursor
- Except where otherwise noted, data are given for materials in their standard state (at 25 °C [77 °F], 100 kPa). verify (what is ?) Infobox references

Safrole is an organic compound with the formula CH_{2}O_{2}C_{6}H_{3}CH_{2}CH=CH_{2}. It is a colorless oily liquid, although impure samples can appear yellow. A member of the phenylpropanoid family of natural products, it is found in sassafras plants, among others. Small amounts are found in a wide variety of plants, where it functions as a natural antifeedant. Ocotea pretiosa, which grows in Brazil, and Sassafras albidum, which grows in eastern North America, are the main natural sources of safrole. It has a characteristic "sweet-shop" aroma.

It is a precursor in the synthesis of the insecticide synergist piperonyl butoxide, the fragrance piperonal via isosafrole, and the empathogenic/entactogenic substance MDMA. In high doses, it is a weak hepatocarcinogen, leading to its ban for human consumption in the United States in the 1960s.

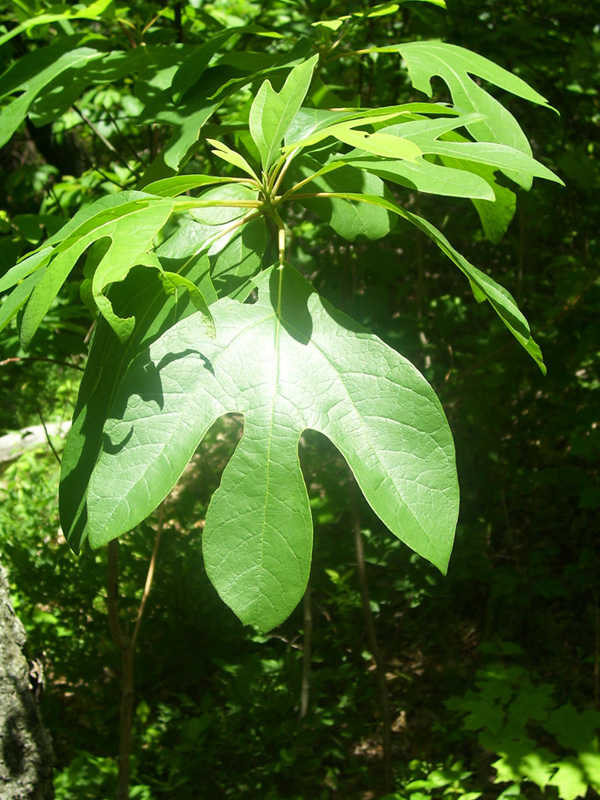
Sassafras albidum

== History ==
Safrole was obtained from a number of plants, but especially from the sassafras tree (Sassafras albidum), which is native to North America, and from Japanese star anise (Illicium anisatum, called shikimi in Japan). In 1844, the French chemist Édouard Saint-Èvre (1817–1879) determined safrole's empirical formula. In 1869, the French chemists Édouard Grimaux (1835–1900) and J. Ruotte investigated and named safrole. They observed its reaction with bromine, suggesting the presence of an allyl group. By 1884, the German chemist Theodor Poleck (1821–1906) suggested that safrole was a derivative of benzene, to which two oxygen atoms were joined as epoxides (cyclic ethers).

In 1885, the Dutch chemist Johann Frederik Eijkman (1851–1915) investigated shikimol, the essential oil that is obtained from Japanese star anise, and he found that, upon oxidation, shikimol formed piperonylic acid, whose basic structure had been determined in 1871 by the German chemist Wilhelm Rudolph Fittig (1835–1910) and his student, the American chemist Ira Remsen (1846–1927). Thus, Eijkman inferred the correct basic structure for shikimol. He also noted that shikimol and safrole had the same empirical formula and had other similar properties, and thus he suggested that they were probably identical. In 1886, Poleck showed that upon oxidation, safrole also formed piperonylic acid, and thus shikimol and safrole were indeed identical. It remained to be determined whether the molecule's C_{3}H_{5} group was a propenyl group (R−CH=CH−CH_{3}) or an allyl group (R−CH_{2}−CH=CH_{2}). In 1888, the German chemist Julius Wilhelm Brühl (1850–1911) determined that the C_{3}H_{5} group was an allyl group.

== Natural occurrence ==
Safrole is the principal component of brown camphor oil made from Ocotea pretiosa, a plant growing in Brazil, and sassafras oil made from Sassafras albidum.

In the United States, commercially available culinary sassafras oil is usually devoid of safrole due to a rule passed by the US FDA in 1960.

Safrole can be obtained through natural extraction from Sassafras albidum and Ocotea cymbarum. Sassafras oil for example is obtained by steam distillation of the root bark of the sassafras tree. The resulting steam distilled product contains about 90% safrole by weight. The oil is dried by mixing it with a small amount of anhydrous calcium chloride. After filtering-off the calcium chloride, the oil is vacuum distilled at 100 °C under a vacuum of 11 mmHg (1.5 kPa) or frozen to crystallize the safrole out. This technique works with other oils in which safrole is present as well.

Safrole is typically extracted from the root-bark or the fruit of Sassafras albidum (native to eastern North America) in the form of sassafras oil, or from Ocotea odorifera, a Brazilian species. Safrole is also present in certain essentials oils and in brown camphor oil, which is present in small amounts in many plants. Safrole can be found in anise, nutmeg, cinnamon, and black pepper. The safrole content of perfume, cologne, and eau de toilette can be determined by dilution with ethanol, followed by separation using high-performance liquid chromatography and quantization using spectrophotofluorometry.

== Applications ==
Safrole is a member of the methylenedioxybenzene group, of which many compounds are used as insecticide synergists; for example, safrole is used as a precursor in the synthesis of the insecticide piperonyl butoxide. Safrole is also used as a precursor in the synthesis of the drug ecstasy (MDMA, 3,4-methylenedioxymethamphetamine). Before safrole was banned by the US FDA in 1960 for use in food, it was used as a food flavor for its characteristic 'candy-shop' aroma. It was used as an additive in root beer, chewing gum, toothpaste, soaps, and certain pharmaceutical preparations.

Safrole exhibits antibiotic and anti-angiogenic functions.

== Synthesis ==
It can be synthesized from catechol first by conversion to methylenedioxybenzene, which is brominated and coupled with allyl bromide.

Safrole is a versatile precursor to many compounds. Examples are N-acylarylhydrazones and isosters, aryl-sulfonamide derivatives, acidic sulfonylhydrazone derivatives, benzothiazine derivatives and many more.

== Isosafrole ==
Isosafrole is produced synthetically from safrole. It is not found in nature. Isosafrole comes in two forms, trans-isosafrole and cis-isosafrole. Isosafrole is used as a precursor for the psychoactive drug MDMA (ecstasy). When safrole is metabolized, several metabolites can be identified. Some of these metabolites have been shown to exhibit toxicological effects, such as 1′-hydroxysafrole and 3′-hydroxysafrole in rats. Further metabolites of safrole that have been found in urine of both rats and humans include 1,2-dihydroxy-4-allylbenzene or 1(2)-methoxy-2(1)hydroxy-4-allylbenzene.

== Metabolism ==
Safrole can undergo many forms of metabolism. The two major routes are the oxidation of the allyl side chain and the oxidation of the methylenedioxy group. The oxidation of the allyl side chain is mediated by a cytochrome P450 complex, which will transform safrole into 1′-hydroxysafrole. The newly formed 1′-hydroxysafrole will undergo a phase II drug metabolism reaction with a sulfotransferase enzyme to create 1′-sulfoxysafrole, which can cause DNA adducts. A different oxidation pathway of the allyl side chain can form safrole epoxide. So far, this has only been found in rats and guinea pigs. The formed epoxide is a small metabolite due to the slow formation and further metabolism of the compound. An epoxide hydratase enzyme will act on the epoxide to form dihydrodiol, which can be secreted in urine.

The metabolism of safrole through the oxidation of the methylenedioxy proceeds via the cleavage of the methylenedioxy group. This results in two major metabolites: allylcatechol and its isomer, propenylcatechol. Eugenol is a minor metabolite of safrole in humans, mice, and rats. The intact allyl side chain of allylcatechol may then be oxidized to yield 2′,3′-epoxypropylcatechol. This can serve as a substrate for an epoxide hydratase enzyme, and will hydrate the 2′,3′-epoxypropylcatechol to 2′,3′-dihydroxypropylcatechol. This new compound can be oxidized to form propionic acid (PPA), which is a substance that is related to an increase in oxidative stress and glutathione S-transferase activity. PPA also causes a decrease in glutathione and Glutathione peroxidase activity. The epoxide of allylcatechol may also be generated from the cleavage of the methylenedioxy group of the safrole epoxide. The cleavage of the methylenedioxy ring and the metabolism of the allyl group involve hepatic microsomal mixed-function oxidases.

== Toxicity ==
Toxicological studies have shown that safrole is a weak hepatocarcinogen at higher doses in rats and mice. Safrole requires metabolic activation before exhibiting toxicological effects. Metabolic conversion of the allyl group in safrole is able to produce intermediates which are directly capable of binding covalently with DNA and proteins. Metabolism of the methylenedioxy group to a carbene allows the molecule to form ligand complexes with cytochrome P450 and P448. The formation of this complex leads to lower amounts of available free cytochrome P450. Safrole can also directly bind to cytochrome P450, leading to competitive inhibition. These two mechanisms result in lowered mixed function oxidase activity.

Furthermore, because of the altered structural and functional properties of cytochrome P450, loss of ribosomes which are attached to the endoplasmic reticulum through cytochrome P450 may occur. The allyl group thus directly contributes to mutagenicity, while the methylenedioxy group is associated with changes in the cytochrome P450 system and epigenetic aspects of carcinogenicity. In rats, safrole and related compounds produced both benign and malignant tumors after intake through the mouth. Changes in the liver are also observed through the enlargement of liver cells and cell death.

In the United States, it was once widely used as a food additive in root beer, sassafras tea, and other common goods, but was banned for human consumption by the FDA after studies in the 1960s suggested that safrole was carcinogenic, causing permanent liver damage in rats; food products sold there purporting to contain sassafras instead contain a safrole-free sassafras extract. Safrole is also banned for use in soap and perfumes by the International Fragrance Association.

According to a 1977 study of the metabolites of safrole in both rats and humans, two carcinogenic metabolites of safrole found in the urine of rats, 1′-hydroxysafrole and 3′-hydroxyisosafrole, were not found in human urine. The European Commission on Health and consumer protection assumes safrole to be genotoxic and carcinogenic. It occurs naturally in a variety of spices, such as cinnamon, nutmeg, and black pepper, and herbs such as basil. In that role, safrole, like many naturally occurring compounds, may have a small but measurable ability to induce cancer in rodents. Despite this, the effects in humans were estimated by the Lawrence Berkeley National Laboratory to be similar to risks posed by breathing indoor air or drinking municipally supplied water.

== Adverse effects ==
Besides being a hepatocarcinogen, safrole exhibits further adverse effects in that it will induce the formation of hepatic lipid hydroperoxides. Safrole also inhibits the defensive function of neutrophils against bacteria. In addition to the inhibition of the defensive function of neutrophils, it has also been discovered that safrole interferes with the formation of superoxides by neutrophils. Furthermore, safrole oxide, a metabolite of safrole, has a negative effect on the central nervous system. Safrole oxide inhibits the expression of integrin β4/SOD, leading to apoptosis of the nerve cells.

== Use in MDMA manufacture ==
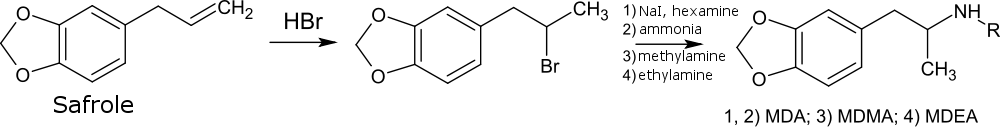
MDMA synthesis from safrole

Safrole is listed as a Table I precursor under the United Nations Convention Against Illicit Traffic in Narcotic Drugs and Psychotropic Substances. Due to their role in the manufacture of MDMA, safrole, isosafrole, and piperonal are Category I precursors under regulation no. 273/2004 of the European Community. In the United States, safrole is currently a List I chemical.

The root bark of American sassafras contains a low percentage of steam-volatile oil, which is typically 75% safrole. Attempts to refine safrole from sassafras bark in mass quantities are generally not economically viable due to low yield and high effort. However, smaller quantities can be extracted quite easily via steam distillation (about 10% of dry sassafras root bark by mass, or about 2% of fresh bark). Demand for safrole is causing rapid and illicit harvesting of the Cinnamomum parthenoxylon tree in Southeast Asia, in particular the Cardamom Mountains in Cambodia. However, it is not clear what proportion of illicitly harvested safrole is going toward MDMA production, as over 90% of the global safrole supply (about 2,000 tonnes or 2,200 short tons per year) is used to manufacture pesticides, fragrances, and other chemicals. Sustainable harvesting of safrole is possible from leaves and stems of certain plants, including the roots of camphor seedlings.

== See also ==
- Sassafras
- Root beer
- PiHKAL § Essential amphetamines
