= Phenylacetone =

Organic compound

- Skeletal formula

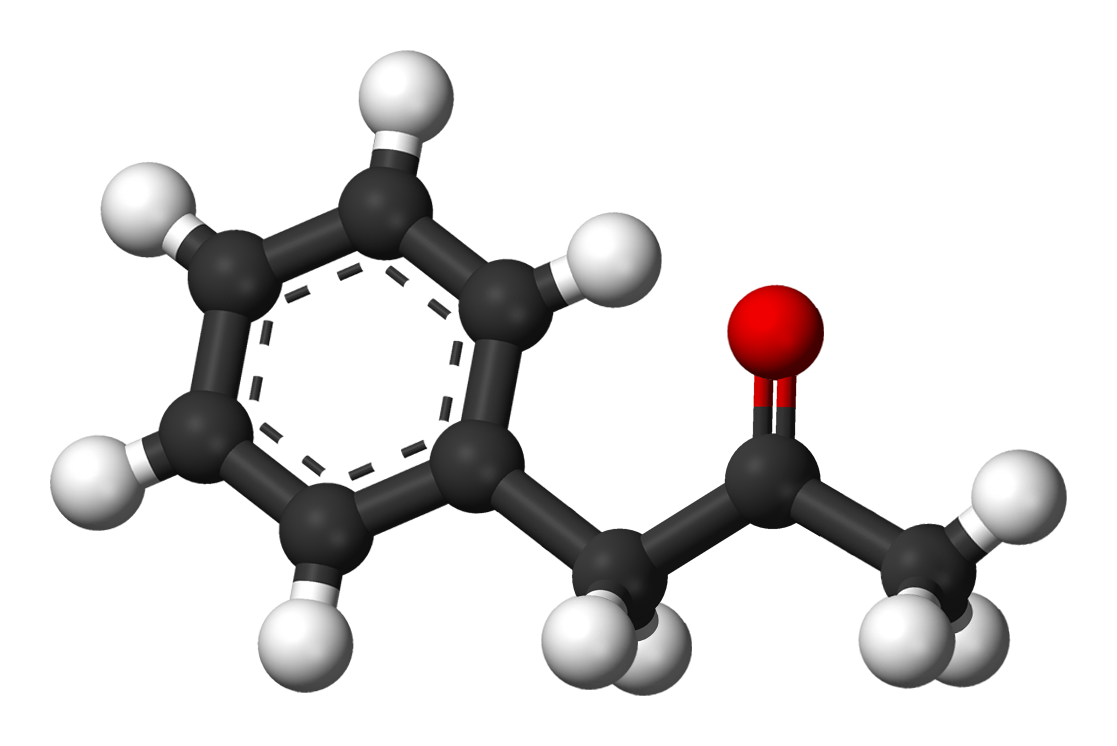
- Ball-and-stick model

Names
- Preferred IUPAC name 1-Phenylpropan-2-one
- Other names Benzyl methyl ketone; Methyl benzyl ketone; Phenyl-2-propanone

Identifiers
| CAS Number | 103-79-7 |
| 3D model (JSmol) | Interactive image |
| ChEBI | CHEBI:52052 |
| ChemSpider | 21106366 |
| ECHA InfoCard | 100.002.859 |
| KEGG | C15512 |
| PubChem CID | 7678 |
| UNII | O7IZH10V9Y |
| CompTox Dashboard (EPA) | DTXSID1059280 |
- InChI: InChI=1S/C9H10O/c1-8(10)7-9-5-3-2-4-6-9/h2-6H,7H2,1H3 Key: QCCDLTOVEPVEJK-UHFFFAOYSA-N; InChI=1/C9H10O/c1-8(10)7-9-5-3-2-4-6-9/h2-6H,7H2,1H3 Key: QCCDLTOVEPVEJK-UHFFFAOYAG
- SMILES: O=C(C)Cc1ccccc1

Properties
| Chemical formula | C_{9}H_{10}O |
| Molar mass | 134.178 g·mol^{−1} |
| Appearance | Colorless |
| Odor | pleasant |
| Density | 1.006 g/mL |
| Melting point | −15 °C (5 °F; 258 K) |
| Boiling point | 214 to 216 °C (417 to 421 °F; 487 to 489 K) |
| Magnetic susceptibility (χ) | −83.44·10^{−6} cm^{3}/mol |
| Legal status | BR: Class D1 (Drug precursors) |
- Except where otherwise noted, data are given for materials in their standard state (at 25 °C [77 °F], 100 kPa). verify (what is ?) Infobox references

Phenylacetone, also known as phenyl-2-propanone, is an organic compound with the chemical formula C_{6}H_{5}CH_{2}COCH_{3}. It is a colorless oil that is soluble in organic solvents. It is a mono-substituted benzene derivative, consisting of an acetone attached to a phenyl group. As such, its systematic IUPAC name is 1-phenyl-2-propanone.

This substance is used in the manufacture of methamphetamine and amphetamine, where it is commonly known as P2P. Due to illicit drug labs using phenylacetone to make amphetamines, phenylacetone was declared a schedule II controlled substance in the United States in 1980. In humans, phenylacetone occurs as a metabolite of amphetamine and methamphetamine via FMO3-mediated oxidative deamination.

== Synthesis ==
There are many routes to synthesize phenylacetone. Industry uses the gas-phase ketonic decarboxylation of phenylacetic acid using acetic acid over a ceria-alumina solid acid catalyst. A related laboratory-scale reaction has been described.

An alternative route is zeolite-catalyzed isomerization of phenylpropylene oxide. Another laboratory synthesis involves conventional routes including the Friedel-Crafts alkylation reaction of chloroacetone with benzene in the presence of aluminum chloride catalyst.

== Regulation ==
To prevent illicit synthesis of amphetamine and methamphetamine, phenylacetone itself and the precursor phenylacetic acid is subject to regulation in the United States under the Chemical Diversion and Trafficking Act.

== As a metabolite of amphetamine ==
Metabolic pathways of amphetamine in humans

Phenylacetone is an intermediate in the biodegradation of amphetamine. In the human liver, flavin-containing monooxygenase 3 (FMO3) deaminates amphetamines into phenylacetone, which is non-toxic to humans. Phenylacetone is oxidized to benzoic acid, which is converted to hippuric acid by glycine N-acyltransferase (GLYAT) enzymes prior to excretion.

Phenylacetone can undergo para-hydroxylation to 4-hydroxyphenylacetone, which occurs as a metabolite of amphetamine in the human body.

== See also ==
- MDP2P – related compound with a methylenedioxy group, and a precursor to MDMA.
- Cyclohexylacetone – the cyclohexane derivative of phenylacetone
- Phenylacetones
- Methamphetamine
- Controlled Substances Act
