= Isosafrole =

- trans-Isosafrole

- cis-Isosafrole

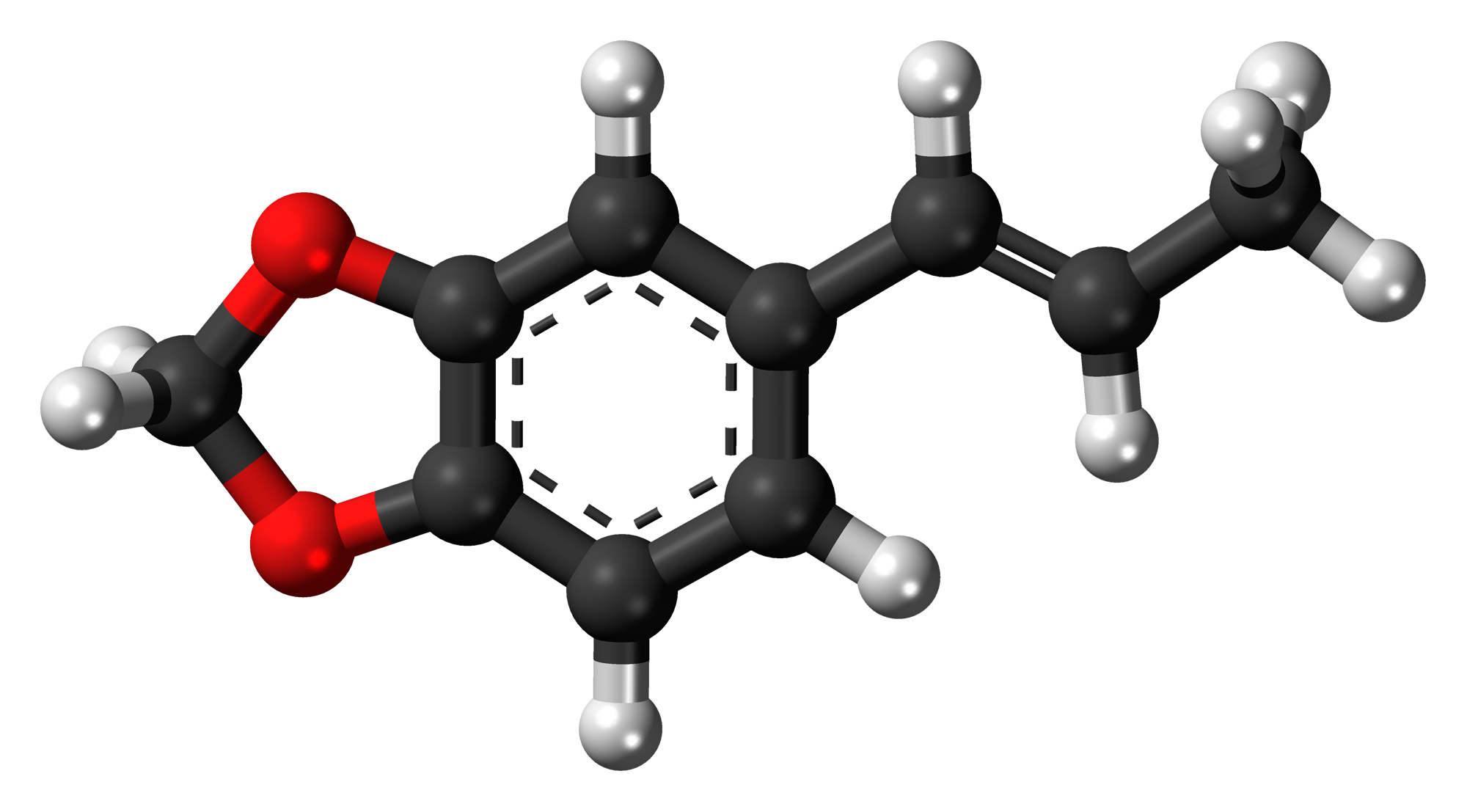
- Ball-and-stick model of isosafrole

Names
- Preferred IUPAC name 5-(Prop-1-enyl)-2H-1,3-benzodioxole
- Other names 5-(1-Propenyl)-1,3-benzodioxole; 3,4-Methylenedioxyphenyl-1-propene

Identifiers
CAS Number	120-58-1; (trans): 4043-71-4; (cis): 17627-76-8
3D model (JSmol)	(trans): Interactive image; (cis): Interactive image
ChEBI	CHEBI:6054
ChEMBL	ChEMBL487603
ChemSpider	8131; (trans): 21106329; (cis): 1266029
ECHA InfoCard	100.004.010
EC Number	204-410-2; (cis): 241-611-4
KEGG	(trans): C10472
PubChem CID	8439; (trans): 637796; (cis): 1549044
RTECS number	(trans): DA5950000
UNII	W6337429LF; (trans): 94BY31ALL6; (cis): 253QUA24R1
UN number	3082
CompTox Dashboard (EPA)	DTXSID2020767
- InChI: InChI=1S/C10H10O2/c1-2-3-8-4-5-9-10(6-8)12-7-11-9/h2-6H,7H2,1H3 Key: VHVOLFRBFDOUSH-UHFFFAOYSA-N; (trans): InChI=1S/C10H10O2/c1-2-3-8-4-5-9-10(6-8)12-7-11-9/h2-6H,7H2,1H3/b3-2+ Key: VHVOLFRBFDOUSH-NSCUHMNNSA-N; (cis): InChI=1S/C10H10O2/c1-2-3-8-4-5-9-10(6-8)12-7-11-9/h2-6H,7H2,1H3/b3-2- Key: VHVOLFRBFDOUSH-IHWYPQMZSA-N
- SMILES: CC=Cc1ccc2OCOc2c1; (trans): C/C=C/C1=CC2=C(C=C1)OCO2; (cis): C/C=C\C1=CC2=C(C=C1)OCO2

Properties
Chemical formula	C_{10}H_{10}O_{2}
Molar mass	162.188 g·mol^{−1}
Density	1.1206 g/cm^{3}, trans 1.1182 g/cm^{3}, cis
Melting point	8.2 °C (46.8 °F; 281.3 K) trans −21.5 °C, cis
Boiling point	255 °C (491 °F; 528 K) trans 243 °C, cis

Hazards
- GHS labelling
Pictograms	(GHS07: Exclamation mark) (GHS08: Health hazard)
Signal word	Danger
Hazard statements	H302, H315, H341, H350
Precautionary statements	P201, P202, P264, P270, P280, P281, P301+P312, P302+P352, P308+P313, P321, P330, P332+P313, P362, P405, P501
Legal status	BR: Class D1 (Drug precursors)
- Except where otherwise noted, data are given for materials in their standard state (at 25 °C [77 °F], 100 kPa). verify (what is ?) Infobox references

Isosafrole is an organic compound that is used in the fragrance industry. Structurally, the molecule is related to allylbenzene, a type of aromatic organic chemical. Its fragrance is reminiscent of anise or licorice. It is found in small amounts in various essential oils, but is most commonly obtained by isomerizing the plant oil safrole. It exists as two geometric isomers, cis-isosafrole and trans-isosafrole.

Isosafrole is a precursor to the important fragrance piperonal. It can also be converted via the intermediate compound MDP2P into the psychoactive drug MDMA ('ecstasy'). As such it requires permits to purchase or sell in any significant quantity in the US.

Isosafrole belongs to the methylenedioxyphenylpropene class of compounds, closely related to safrole, and is considered part of the broader phenylpropanoid family of natural products. This classification reflects its structural origin from plant-derived aromatic compounds and helps explain its occurrence in essential oils.

== See also ==
- PiHKAL § Essential amphetamines
