= C11H17NO =

The molecular formula C_{11}H_{17}NO (molar mass : 179.25 g/mol, exact mass : 179.131014) may refer to:

- 4-Ethoxyamphetamine
- 4-Methylephedrine
- 3-Methoxymethamphetamine
- 3-Methoxy-4-methylamphetamine
- Methoxyphenamine
- N-Methylephedrine
- N-Methylpseudoephedrine
- Paramethoxymethamphetamine
- Mexiletine
- Leptodactyline
