= C10H15NO =

The molecular formula C_{10}H_{15}NO (molar mass : 165.23 g/mol, exact mass : 165.115364) may refer to:

- Anatoxin-a
- Ephedrine
- Ferruginine
- Hordenine
- Hydroxymethylamphetamine
- 3-Hydroxy-N,N-dimethylphenethylamine
- 2-Methoxyamphetamine
- 3-Methoxyamphetamine
- para-Methoxyamphetamine (4-methoxyamphetamine)
- Perillartine
- Pholedrine
- Pseudoephedrine
- Racephedrine
- Talsaclidine
