= Substituted amphetamine =

Class of compounds based upon the amphetamine structure

- Drug class
- Racemic amphetamine skeleton

Class identifiers
- Synonyms: Amphetamines; α-Methylphenethylamines; α-Methylphenylethylamines; Phenylisopropylamines
- Chemical class: Substituted derivatives of amphetamine

Legal status

Optical isomers of amphetamine

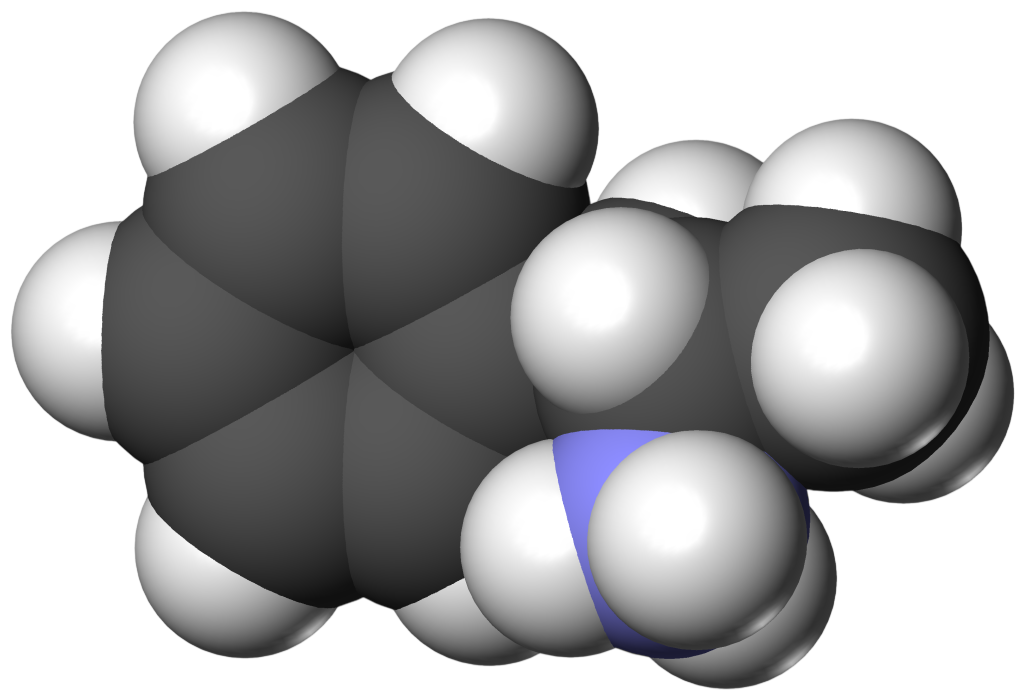
L-amphetamine

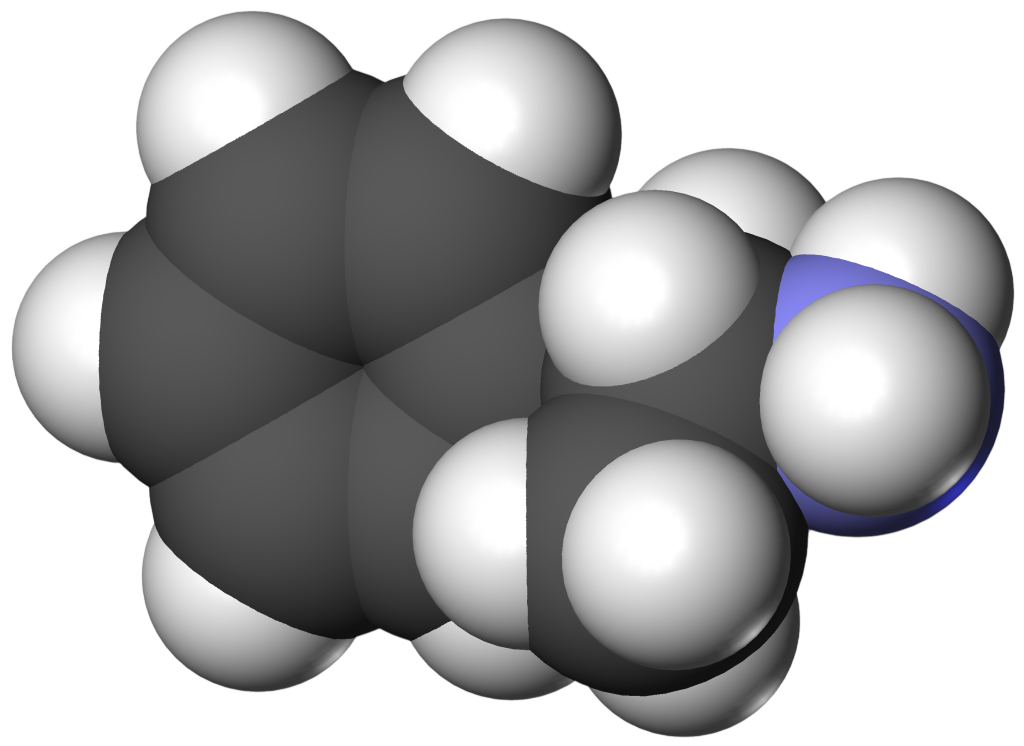
D-amphetamine

Substituted amphetamines, or simply amphetamines, are a class of compounds based upon the amphetamine structure; it includes all derivative compounds which are formed by replacing, or substituting, one or more hydrogen atoms in the amphetamine core structure with substituents. The compounds in this class span a variety of pharmacological subclasses, including stimulants, empathogens, and hallucinogens, among others. Examples of substituted amphetamines are amphetamine (itself), methamphetamine, ephedrine, cathinone, phentermine, mephentermine, tranylcypromine, bupropion, methoxyphenamine, selegiline, amfepramone (diethylpropion), pyrovalerone, MDMA (ecstasy), and DOM (STP).

Some of amphetamine's substituted derivatives occur in nature, for example in the leaves of Ephedra and khat plants. Amphetamine was first produced at the end of the 19th century. By the 1930s, amphetamine and some of its derivative compounds found use as decongestants in the symptomatic treatment of colds and also occasionally as psychoactive agents. Their effects on the central nervous system are diverse, but can be summarized by three overlapping types of activity: stimulant, psychedelic, and entactogenic. Various substituted amphetamines may cause these actions either separately or in combination.

== Partial list of substituted amphetamines ==
Generic or Trivial Name	Chemical Name	# of Subs
Amphetamine	α-Methyl-phenethylamine	0
Tranylcypromine	trans-2-Phenylcyclopropylamine	0 (Note: The isopropylamine side chain of amphetamine is cyclized into a cyclopropylamine ring structure in tranylcypromine.)
Methamphetamine	N-Methylamphetamine	1
Ethylamphetamine	N-Ethylamphetamine	1
Propylamphetamine	N-Propylamphetamine	1
Isopropylamphetamine	N-iso-Propylamphetamine	1
Butylamphetamine	N-n-Butylamphetamine	1
Pheniprazine	N-Aminoamphetamine	1
Phenatine	N-Nicotinoylamphetamine	1
Lisdexamfetamine	L-Lysine–amphetamine conjugate, (S)-	1
Phentermine	α-Methylamphetamine	1
Phenylpropanolamine (PPA)	β-Hydroxyamphetamine, (1R,2S)-	1
Cathine	β-Hydroxyamphetamine, (1S,2S)-	1
Cathinone	β-Ketoamphetamine	1
Ortetamine	2-Methylamphetamine	1
2-Fluoroamphetamine (2-FA)	2-Fluoroamphetamine	1
3-Methylamphetamine (3-MA)	3-Methylamphetamine	1
2-Phenyl-3-aminobutane	2-Phenyl-3-aminobutane	1
3-Fluoroamphetamine (3-FA)	3-Fluoroamphetamine	1
Gepefrine	3-Hydroxyamphetamine	1
Norfenfluramine	3-Trifluoromethylamphetamine	1
4-Methylamphetamine (4-MA)	4-Methylamphetamine	1
para-Methoxyamphetamine (PMA)	4-Methoxyamphetamine	1
para-Ethoxyamphetamine	4-Ethoxyamphetamine	1
4-Methylthioamphetamine (4-MTA)	4-Methylthioamphetamine	1
Norpholedrine (α-Me-TRA)	4-Hydroxyamphetamine	1
para-Bromoamphetamine (PBA, 4-BA)	4-Bromoamphetamine	1
para-Chloroamphetamine (PCA, 4-CA)	4-Chloroamphetamine	1
para-Fluoroamphetamine (PFA, 4-FA, 4-FMP)	4-Fluoroamphetamine	1
para-Iodoamphetamine (PIA, 4-IA)	4-Iodoamphetamine	1
Mefenorex	N-(3-Chloropropyl)amphetamine	1
Clobenzorex	N-(2-Chlorobenzyl)amphetamine	1
Amfetaminil	N-Cyanobenzylamphetamine	1
Amfecloral	N-(2,2,2-Trichloroethylidene)amphetamine	1
Racefemine	N-(1-Methyl-2-phenoxyethyl)amphetamine	1
Dextrofemine	N-(1-Methyl-2-phenoxyethyl)amphetamine, (+)-	1
Fenproporex	N-2-Cyanoethylamphetamine	1
Prenylamine	N-(3,3-Diphenylpropyl)amphetamine	1
Fenethylline	Theophylline–amphetamine conjugate	1
Dimethylamphetamine	N,N-Dimethylamphetamine	2
Benzphetamine	N-Benzyl-N-methylamphetamine	2
Deprenyl	N-Methyl-N-propargylamphetamine	2
D-Deprenyl	N-Methyl-N-propargylamphetamine, (S)-	2
Selegiline	N-Methyl-N-propargylamphetamine, (R)-	2
Metfendrazine	N-Amino-N-methylamphetamine	2
Mephentermine	N-Methyl-α-methylamphetamine	2
Phenpentermine	α,β-Dimethylamphetamine	2
Ephedrine	β-Hydroxy-N-methylamphetamine, (1R,2S)-	2
Pseudoephedrine (PSE)	β-Hydroxy-N-methylamphetamine, (1S,2S)-	2
Metaraminol	3,β-Dihydroxyamphetamine, (1R,2S)-	2
Methcathinone	β-Keto-N-methylamphetamine	2
Ethcathinone	β-Keto-N-ethylamphetamine	2
Clortermine	2-Chloro-α-methylamphetamine	2
Methoxymethylamphetamine (MMA)	3-Methoxy-4-methylamphetamine	2
Fenfluramine	3-Trifluoromethyl-N-ethylamphetamine	2
Dexfenfluramine	3-Trifluoromethyl-N-ethylamphetamine, (S)-	2
4-Methylmethamphetamine (4-MMA)	4-Methyl-N-methylamphetamine	2
para-Methoxymethamphetamine (PMMA)	4-Methoxy-N-methylamphetamine	2
para-Methoxyethylamphetamine (PMEA)	4-Methoxy-N-ethylamphetamine	2
Pholedrine	4-Hydroxy-N-methylamphetamine	2
Chlorphentermine	4-Chloro-α-methylamphetamine	2
para-Fluoromethamphetamine (PFMA, 4-FMA)	4-Fluoro-N-methylamphetamine	2
Xylopropamine	3,4-Dimethylamphetamine	2
α-Methyldopamine (α-Me-DA)	3,4-Dihydroxyamphetamine	2
3,4-Methylenedioxyamphetamine (MDA)	3,4-Methylenedioxyamphetamine	2
Dimethoxyamphetamine (DMA)	X,X-Dimethoxyamphetamine	2
6-APB	6-(2-Aminopropyl)benzofuran	2
Phenylpropylaminopentane (PPAP)	α-Desmethyl-α,N-dipropylamphetamine	2
Furfenorex	N-(2-Furylmethyl)-N-methylamphetamine	2
Fencamine	8-Aminocaffeine–methamphetamine conjugate	2
Nordefrin (α-Me-NE)	β,3,4-Trihydroxyamphetamine, (R)-	3
Methylephedrine	β-Hydroxy-N-methylamphetamine, (1R,2S)-	3
Etafedrine	β-Hydroxy-N-ethylamphetamine, (1R,2S)-	3
Oxilofrine	β,4-Dihydroxy-N-methylamphetamine	3
Cinnamedrine	β-Hydroxy-N-methyl-N-cinnamylamphetamine	3
Methoxamine	2,6-Dimethoxy-β-hydroxyamphetamine	3
Aleph	2,5-Dimethoxy-4-methylthioamphetamine	3
Dimethoxybromoamphetamine (DOB)	2,5-Dimethoxy-4-bromoamphetamine	3
Dimethoxychloroamphetamine (DOC)	2,5-Dimethoxy-4-chloroamphetamine	3
Dimethoxyfluoroethylamphetamine (DOEF)	2,5-Dimethoxy-4-fluoroethylamphetamine	3
Dimethoxyethylamphetamine (DOET)	2,5-Dimethoxy-4-ethylamphetamine	3
Dimethoxyfluoroamphetamine (DOF)	2,5-Dimethoxy-4-fluoroamphetamine	3
Dimethoxyiodoamphetamine (DOI)	2,5-Dimethoxy-4-iodoamphetamine	3
Dimethoxymethylamphetamine (DOM)	2,5-Dimethoxy-4-methylamphetamine	3
Dimethoxynitroamphetamine (DON)	2,5-Dimethoxy-4-nitroamphetamine	3
Dimethoxypropylamphetamine (DOPR)	2,5-Dimethoxy-4-propylamphetamine	3
Dimethoxytrifluoromethylamphetamine (DOTFM)	2,5-Dimethoxy-4-trifluoromethylamphetamine	3
Methylenedioxymethamphetamine (MDMA)	3,4-Methylenedioxy-N-methylamphetamine	3
Methylenedioxyethylamphetamine (MDEA)	3,4-Methylenedioxy-N-ethylamphetamine	3
Methylenedioxyhydroxyamphetamine (MDOH)	3,4-Methylenedioxy-N-hydroxyamphetamine	3
2-Methyl-MDA	3,4-Methylenedioxy-2-methylamphetamine	3
5-Methyl-MDA	4,5-Methylenedioxy-3-methylamphetamine	3
Methoxymethylenedioxyamphetamine (MMDA)	3-Methoxy-4,5-methylenedioxyamphetamine	3
Trimethoxyamphetamine (TMA)	X,X,X-Trimethoxyamphetamine	3
Dimethylcathinone	β-Keto-N,N-dimethylamphetamine	3
Diethylcathinone	β-Keto-N,N-diethylamphetamine	3
Bupropion	β-Keto-3-chloro-N-tert-butylamphetamine	3
Mephedrone (4-MMC)	β-Keto-4-methyl-N-methylamphetamine	3
Methedrone (PMMC)	β-Keto-4-methoxy-N-methylamphetamine	3
Brephedrone (4-BMC)	β-Keto-4-bromo-N-methylamphetamine	3
Flephedrone (4-FMC)	β-Keto-4-fluoro-N-methylamphetamine	3
Ritodrine	4,β-Dihydroxy-N-(4-hydroxyphenylethyl)amphetamine	3
Buphenine (nylidrin)	4,β-Dihydroxy-N-(...)-amphetamine	3
Trecadrine	β-Hydroxy-N-methyl-N-(...)-amphetamine	3
Isoxsuprine	4,β-Dihydroxy-N-(...)-amphetamine	3
Dioxifedrine	3,4,β-Trihydroxy-N-methylamphetamine	4
Dioxethedrin	3,4,β-Trihydroxy-N-ethylamphetamine	4

== Prodrugs of amphetamine/methamphetamine ==
A variety of prodrugs of amphetamine and/or methamphetamine exist, and include amfecloral, amfetaminil, benzphetamine, clobenzorex, D-deprenyl, deprenyl, dimethylamphetamine, ethylamphetamine, fencamine, fenethylline, fenproporex, furfenorex, lisdexamfetamine, lomardexamfetamine, mefenorex, prenylamine, and selegiline.

== Russian amphetamines ==
A number of synthetic Russian amphetamine derivatives have been developed, including alafen (amphetamine–β-alanine), feprosidnine, gamofen (amphetamine–GABA), mesocarb, methylphenatine, pabofen (amphetamine–PABA), phenatine (amphetamine–niacin; N-nicotinoylamphetamine), phenylphenamine (phenylamphetamine), propylphenamine (propylamphetamine), pyridoxiphen (amphetamine–pyridoxine), and thiophenatine (N-thionicotinoylamphetamine).

== Structure ==
This shows phenethylamine in blue with its substitution points marked. Amphetamine and its substituted derivatives contain a CH_{3} group at the alpha-position (R^{α}).

This shows amphetamine with its substitution points marked, excluding the N-position at the NH_{2} group which is unmarked. The wavy line between α carbon and CH_{3} group indicates isomerism; the CH_{3} group may either be towards or away from the viewer.

Amphetamines are a subgroup of the substituted phenethylamine class of compounds. Substitution of hydrogen atoms results in a large class of compounds. Typical reaction is substitution by methyl and sometimes ethyl groups at the amine and phenyl sites:

Substance	Substituents							Structure	Sources
Substance	N	α	β	phenyl group				Structure	Sources
Substance	N	α	β	2	3	4	5	Structure	Sources
Phenethylamine								Phenethylamine	
Phenelzine	-NH_{2}								
Amphetamine (α-methylphenylethylamine)		-CH_{3}						Amphetamine	
Methamphetamine (N-methylamphetamine)	-CH_{3}	-CH_{3}						Methamphetamine	
Phentermine (α-methylamphetamine)		-(CH_{3})_{2}						Phentermine	
Phenylpropanolamine		-CH_{3}	-OH						
Tranylcypromine		-CH_{2}-							
Phenylephrine	-CH_{3}		-OH		-OH				
Ephedrine	-CH_{3}	-CH_{3}	-OH					(+)-Ephedrine	
Pseudoephedrine	-CH_{3}	-CH_{3}	-OH					(+)-Pseudoephedrine	
Cathinone		-CH_{3}	=O					Cathinone	
Methcathinone (ephedrone)	-CH_{3}	-CH_{3}	=O					Methcathinone	
Diethylpropion (amfepramone)	-CH_{2}-CH_{3}, -CH_{2}-CH_{3}	-CH_{3}	=O						
Bupropion	-C(CH_{3})_{3}	-CH_{3}	=O		-Cl				
Desmethylselegiline	-CH_{2}-C≡CH	-CH_{3}							
Selegiline	-CH_{3}, -CH_{2}-C≡CH	-CH_{3}							
Benzphetamine	-CH_{3}, -CH_{2}-Ph (Note: Ph = phenyl group, consisting of a benzene ring)	-CH_{3}							
MDA (3,4-methylenedioxyamphetamine)		-CH_{3}			-O-CH_{2}-O-			3,4-methylenedioxyamphetamine	
MDMA (3,4-methylenedioxymethamphetamine)	-CH_{3}	-CH_{3}			-O-CH_{2}-O-			3,4-methylenedioxymethamphetamine	
MDEA (3,4-methylenedioxy-N-ethylamphetamine)	-CH_{2}-CH_{3}	-CH_{3}			-O-CH_{2}-O-			methylenedioxyethylamphetamine	
EDMA (3,4-ethylenedioxy-N-methylamphetamine)	-CH_{3}	-CH_{3}			-O-CH_{2}-CH_{2}-O-			3,4-ethylenedioxy-N-methylamphetamine	
MBDB (N-methyl-1,3-benzodioxolylbutanamine)	-CH_{3}	-CH_{2}-CH_{3}			-O-CH_{2}-O-			N-methyl-1-(3,4-methylenedioxyphenyl)-2-aminobutane	
PMA (para-methoxyamphetamine)		-CH_{3}				-O-CH_{3}		para-methoxyamphetamine	
PMMA (para-methoxymethamphetamine)	-CH_{3}	-CH_{3}				-O-CH_{3}		para-methoxymethamphetamine	
4-MTA (4-methylthioamphetamine)		-CH_{3}				-S-CH_{3}		4-methylthioamphetamine	
3,4-DMA (3,4-dimethoxyamphetamine)		-CH_{3}			-O-CH_{3}	-O-CH_{3}		dimethoxyamphetamine	
Mescaline					-O-CH_{3}	-O-CH_{3}	-O-CH_{3}		
3,4,5-Trimethoxyamphetamine (α-methylmescaline)		-CH_{3}			-O-CH_{3}	-O-CH_{3}	-O-CH_{3}	trimethoxyamphetamine	
DOM (2,5-dimethoxy-4-methylamphetamine)		-CH_{3}		-O-CH_{3}		-CH_{3}	-O-CH_{3}	2,5-dimethoxy-4-methylamphetamine	
DOB (2,5-dimethoxy-4-bromoamphetamine)		-CH_{3}		-O-CH_{3}		-Br	-O-CH_{3}	2,5-dimethoxy-4-bromoamphetamine	
Fenfluramine	-CH_{2}-CH_{3}	-CH_{3}			-CF_{3}				

== History ==
Ephedra was used 5000 years ago in China as a medicinal plant; its active ingredients are alkaloids ephedrine, pseudoephedrine, norephedrine (phenylpropanolamine) and norpseudoephedrine (cathine). Natives of Yemen and Ethiopia have a long tradition of chewing khat leaves to achieve a stimulating effect. The active substances of khat are cathinone and, to a lesser extent, cathine.

Amphetamine was first synthesized in 1887 by Romanian chemist Lazăr Edeleanu, although its pharmacological effects remained unknown until the 1930s. MDMA was produced in 1912 (in 1914, according to other sources) as an intermediate product. However, this synthesis also went largely unnoticed. In the 1920s, both methamphetamine and the dextrorotatory optical isomer of amphetamine, dextroamphetamine, were synthesized. This synthesis was a by-product of a search for ephedrine, a bronchodilator used to treat asthma extracted exclusively from natural sources. Over-the-counter use of substituted amphetamines was initiated in the early 1930s by the pharmaceutical company Smith, Kline & French (now part of GlaxoSmithKline), as a medicine (Benzedrine) for colds and nasal congestion. Subsequently, amphetamine was used in the treatment of narcolepsy, obesity, hay fever, orthostatic hypotension, epilepsy, Parkinson's disease, alcoholism and migraine. The "reinforcing" effects of substituted amphetamines were quickly discovered, and the misuse of substituted amphetamines had been noted as far back as 1936.

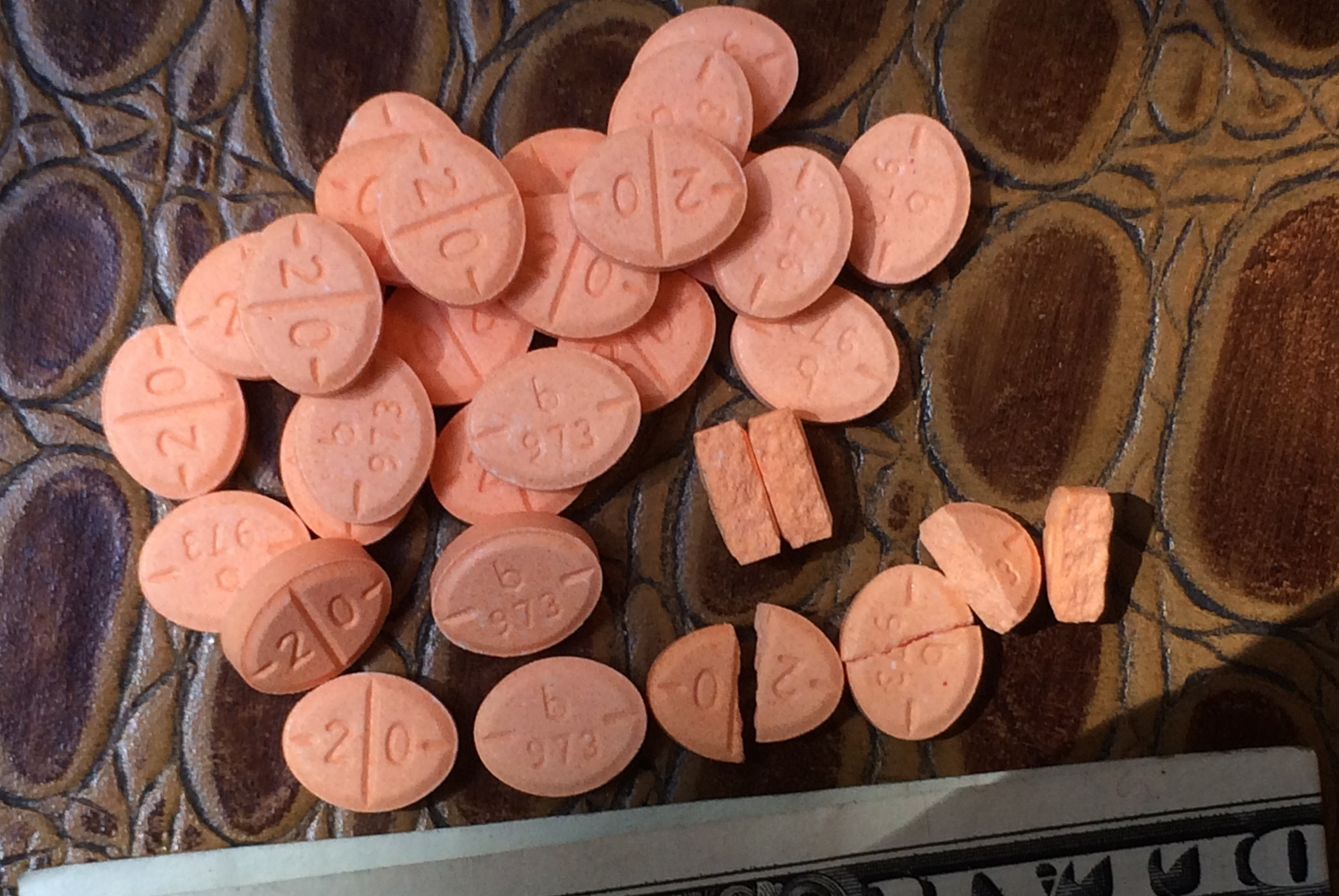
Amphetamine pills

During World War II, amphetamines were used by the German military to keep their tank crews awake for long periods, and treat depression. It was noticed that extended rest was required after such artificially induced activity. The widespread use of substituted amphetamines began in postwar Japan and quickly spread to other countries. Modified "designer amphetamines", such as MDA and PMA, have gained in popularity since the 1960s. In 1970, the United States adopted "the Controlled Substances Act" that limited non-medical use of substituted amphetamines. Street use of PMA was noted in 1972. MDMA emerged as a substitute for MDA in the early 1970s. American chemist Alexander Shulgin first synthesized the drug in 1976 and through him the drug was briefly introduced into psychotherapy. Recreational use grew and in 1985 MDMA was banned by the US authorities in an emergency scheduling initiated by the Drug Enforcement Administration.

Since the mid-1990s, MDMA has become a popular entactogenic drug among the youth and quite often non-MDMA substances were sold as ecstasy. Ongoing trials are investigating its efficacy as an adjunct to psychotherapy in the management of treatment-resistant post-traumatic stress disorder (PTSD).

== Legal status ==
Agents	Legal status by 2009.			
Agents	US	Russia	Australia	United Nations (INCB)
Amphetamine (racemic)	Schedule II	Schedule II	Schedule II	Schedule 8
Dextroamphetamine (D-amphetamine)	Schedule II	Schedule II	Schedule I	Schedule 8
Levoamphetamine (L-amphetamine)	Schedule II	Schedule II	Schedule III	Schedule 8
Methamphetamine	Schedule II	Schedule II	Schedule I	Schedule 8
Cathinone Methcathinone	Schedule I	Schedule I	Schedule I	Schedule 9
MDA, MDMA, MDEA	Schedule I	Schedule I	Schedule I	Schedule 9
PMA	Schedule I	Schedule I	Schedule I	Schedule 9
DOB, DOM, 3,4,5-TMA	Schedule I	Schedule I	Schedule I	Schedule 9

== See also ==
- Substituted phenethylamines
- Substituted β-hydroxyamphetamines
- Substituted methylenedioxyphenethylamines
- Substituted cathinones
- Substituted phenylmorpholines
- Substituted methoxyphenethylamine
- 2Cs, DOx, 4Cs, 25-NB, 3C, scaline, FLY
- Substituted tryptamines
- Substituted α-alkyltryptamines
- PiHKAL
- The Shulgin Index

== Bibliography ==
- Ghodse, Hamid (2002). Drugs and Addictive Behaviour. A Guide to Treatment. 3rd Edition. Cambridge University Press. p. 501. ISBN 978-0-511-05844-8.
- Glennon, Richard A. (2008). "Neurobiology of Hallucinogens". The American Psychiatric Publishing textbook of substance abuse treatment. American Psychiatric Publishing. ISBN 978-1-58562-276-4.
- Goldfrank, Lewis R. & Flomenbaum, Neal (2006). Goldfrank's Toxicologic Emergencies, 8th Edition. McGraw Hill. ISBN 978-0-07-147914-1.
- Katzung, Bertram G. (2009). Basic & clinical pharmacology. 11th edition. McGraw-Hill Medical. ISBN 978-0-07-160405-5.
- Ledgard, Jared (2007). A Laboratory History of Narcotics. Volume 1. Amphetamines and Derivatives. Jared Ledgard. p. 268. ISBN 978-0-615-15694-1.
- Schatzberg, Alan F. & Nemeroff, Charles B. (2009). The American Psychiatric Publishing Textbook of Psychopharmacology. The American Psychiatric Publishing. ISBN 978-1-58562-309-9.
- Snow, Otto (2002). Amphetamine syntheses. Thoth Press. ISBN 978-0-9663128-3-6.
- Veselovskaya NV, Kovalenko AE (2000). Drugs. Properties, effects, pharmacokinetics, metabolism. MA: Triada-X. ISBN 978-5-94497-029-9.
