= C12H19NO =

The molecular formula C_{12}H_{19}NO (molar mass: 193.28 g/mol, exact mass: 193.1467 u) may refer to:

- Etafedrine
- Ethylephedrine
- Paramethoxyethylamphetamine
