= LSM6 (disambiguation) =

LSM6 or LSM-6 may refer to:

- U6 snRNA-associated Sm-like protein LSm6 (LSM6)
- 3-Hydroxy-N,N-dimethylphenethylamine (LSM-6)
