= Methoxymethamphetamine =

Methoxymethamphetamine, or methoxymethylamphetamine may refer to:

- 2-Methoxymethamphetamine (2-MMA) or ortho-methoxymethamphetamine (OMMA) or methoxyphenamine
- 3-Methoxymethamphetamine (3-MMA) or meta-methoxymethamphetamine (MMMA)
- 4-Methoxymethamphetamine (4-MMA) or para-methoxymethamphetamine (PMMA)
