= 4-MMA =

4-MMA may refer to:

- 4-Methoxy-N-methylamphetamine
- 4-Methylmethamphetamine
