= (−)-N-Methylpseudoephedrine =

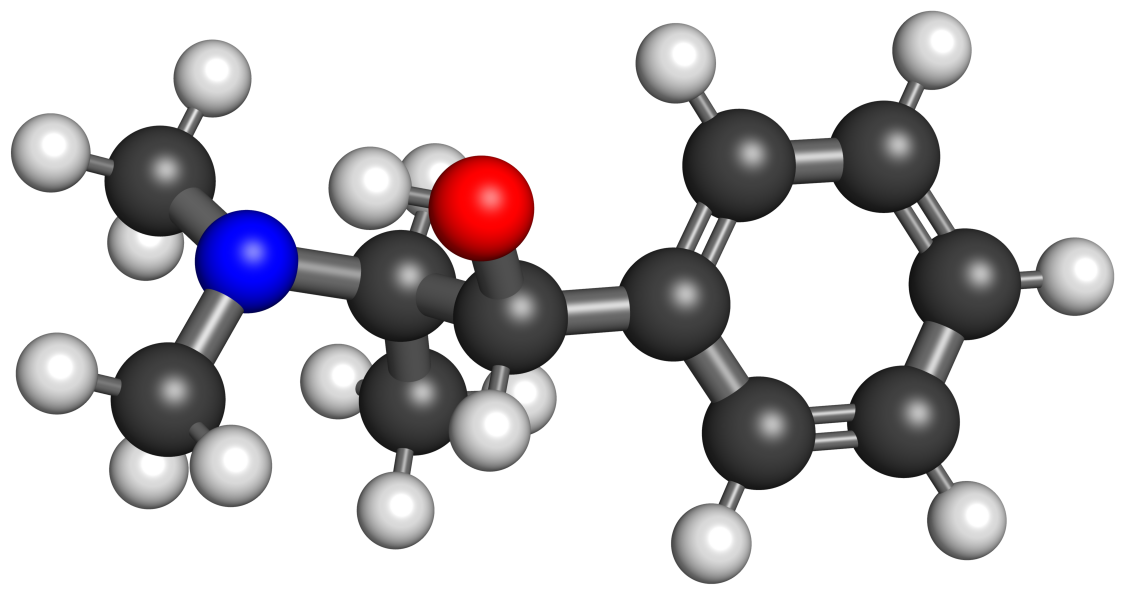

Names
- IUPAC name (1R,2R)-2-(dimethylamino)-1-phenylpropan-1-ol

Identifiers
CAS Number	14222-20-9
3D model (JSmol)	Interactive image
ChemSpider	4645551
PubChem CID	5706040
CompTox Dashboard (EPA)	DTXSID501016413
- InChI: InChI=1S/C11H17NO/c1-9(12(2)3)11(13)10-7-5-4-6-8-10/h4-9,11,13H,1-3H3/t9-,11+/m1/s1 Key: FMCGSUUBYTWNDP-KOLCDFICSA-N
- SMILES: C[C@H]([C@@H](C1=CC=CC=C1)O)N(C)C

Properties
Chemical formula	C_{11}H_{17}NO
Molar mass	179.263 g·mol^{−1}
- Except where otherwise noted, data are given for materials in their standard state (at 25 °C [77 °F], 100 kPa). Infobox references

(−)-N-Methylpseudoephedrine — is an alkaloid. It is the enantiomer of (+)-N-Methylpseudoephedrine, and it is found in Ephedra sinica.
