= Para-Methoxymethamphetamine =

Stimulant and entactogen designer drug

PMMA

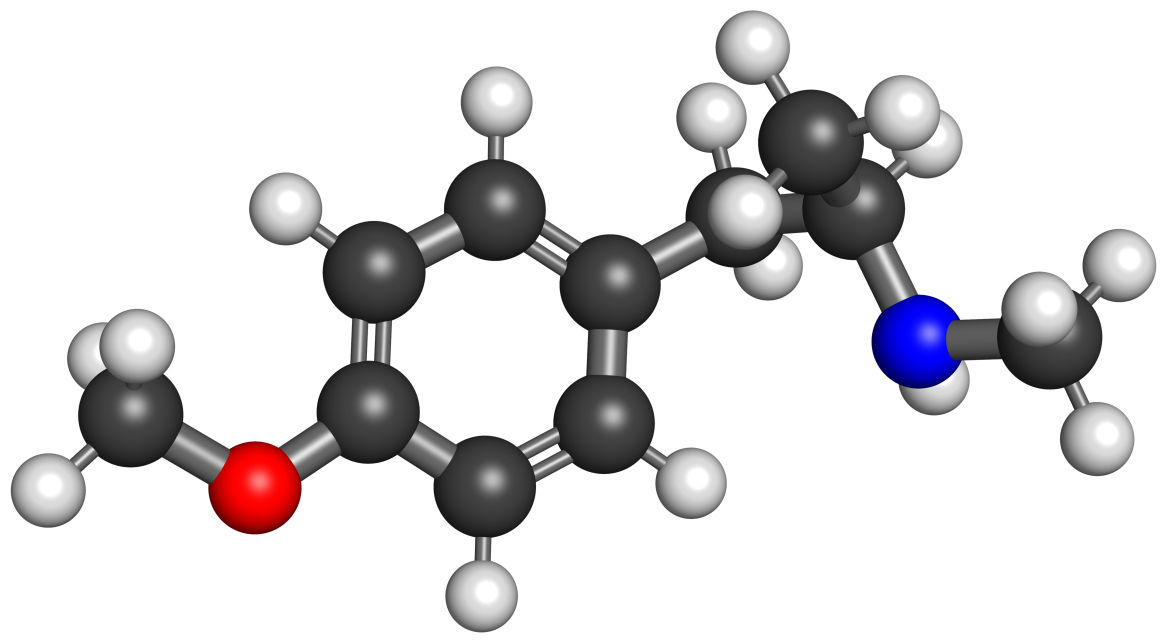

Clinical data
- Other names: PMMA; p-Methoxymethamphetamine; para-Methoxy-N-methylamphetamine; 4-Methoxy-N-methylamphetamine; 4-MMA; Methyl-MA; 4-PMDA; Doone
- Routes of administration: Oral
- Drug class: Psychoactive drug; Serotonin–norepinephrine releasing agent; Monoamine oxidase inhibitor

Legal status
- Legal status: BR: Class F2 (Prohibited psychotropics); CA: Schedule I; DE: Anlage I (Authorized scientific use only); UK: Class A; US: Schedule 1

Pharmacokinetic data
- Metabolism: CYP2D6,
- Metabolites: Pholedrine , para-methoxyamphetamine, 4-hydroxyamphetamine, 3,4-dihydroxymethamphetamine, oxilofrine
- Onset of action: ≤1 hour
- Duration of action: "Short" (~4 hours)

Identifiers
- IUPAC name: 1-(4-Methoxyphenyl)-N-methylpropan-2-amine
- CAS Number: 22331-70-0
- PubChem CID: 90766
- ChemSpider: 81951
- UNII: 037U5SR9KL
- KEGG: C22810
- CompTox Dashboard (EPA): DTXSID30874251
- ECHA InfoCard: 100.040.818

Chemical and physical data
- Formula: C_{11}H_{17}NO
- Molar mass: 179.263 g·mol^{−1}
- 3D model (JSmol): Interactive image; Interactive image
- SMILES: CC(CC1=CC=C(C=C1)OC)NC; C1=CC(=CC=C1CC(C)NC)OC
- InChI: InChI=1S/C11H17NO/c1-9(12-2)8-10-4-6-11(13-3)7-5-10/h4-7,9,12H,8H2,1-3H3; Key:UGFMBZYKVQSQFX-UHFFFAOYSA-N

para-Methoxymethamphetamine (PMMA), also known as 4-methoxy-N-methylamphetamine (4-MMA), is a serotonergic drug of the amphetamine family related to para-methoxyamphetamine (PMA). It is the 4-methoxy analogue of methamphetamine.

Little is known about the pharmacological properties, metabolism, and toxicity of PMMA; because of its structural similarity to PMA, which has known toxicity in humans, it is thought to have considerable potential to cause harmful side effects or death in overdose. In the early 2010s, a number of deaths in users of the drug MDMA (ecstasy) were linked to misrepresented tablets and capsules of PMMA.

PMMA is a serotonin–norepinephrine releasing agent (SNRA) as well as potent monoamine oxidase inhibitor (MAOI). It has a reduced tendency to produce severe hyperthermia at low doses compared to PMA, but at higher doses, side effects and risk of death become similar to those of PMA.

The synthesis and effects of PMMA were described by American experimental chemist Alexander Shulgin in his book PiHKAL, where it is referred to by the name "methyl-MA", as the N-methylated form of 4-MA (PMA).

== Use and effects ==
In his book PiHKAL (Phenethylamines I Have Known and Loved), Alexander Shulgin lists PMMA's dose as greater than 100 mg orally and its duration as "short". In a single provided experience report, the onset of the drug was given as within 1 hour and the duration as 4 hours. The effects of PMMA included tachycardia, compulsive yawning, nystagmus, a little of the physical side of MDMA but none of the central effects, and all of the hints of the cardiovascular effects of MDMA. Similarly, Shulgin describes para-methoxyamphetamine (PMA) as a "pretty pushy stimulant with little if any sensory sparkle", and notes that N-methyl derivatives like PMMA tend to have maintained stimulant effects but greatly reduced psychedelic effects. He stated that "I tried [PMMA] and didn't like it".

== Pharmacology ==
=== Pharmacodynamics ===
PMMA is a monoamine releasing agent (MRA). The drug's EC_{50} values for induction of monoamine release in rat brain synaptosomes have been reported for the individual enantiomers of PMMA. In the case of (S)-PMMA, they were 41 nM for serotonin, 147 nM for norepinephrine, and 1,000 nM for dopamine, whereas for (R)-PMMA, they were 134 nM for serotonin, >14,000 nM for norepinephrine, and 1,600 nM for dopamine. Hence, PMMA appears to be a serotonin–norepinephrine releasing agent (SNRA) with weak effects on dopamine release. The drug has been found to strongly release serotonin and to weakly release dopamine in the brain in rodents in vivo.

In addition to its MRA activity, PMMA is a potent monoamine oxidase A (MAO-A) inhibitor. Its IC_{50} for MAO-A inhibition has been reported to be 1,700 nM. This is several-fold less potent than the related agents para-methoxyamphetamine (PMA) and 4-methylthioamphetamine (4-MTA).

PMMA is said to lack affinity for the serotonin 5-HT_{2A} receptor. In one study, its affinities were >20,000 nM for the serotonin 5-HT_{1A} receptor, 13,600 nM for the serotonin 5-HT_{2A} receptor, and >13,000 nM for the serotonin 5-HT_{2C} receptor. On the other hand, PMMA shows much higher affinities for the mouse and rat trace amine-associated receptor 1 (TAAR1).

In rodents, PMMA produces hyperlocomotion, no changes in locomotor activity, and/or catatonia, and has effects that are said to differ from those of amphetamine-like stimulants. It has been said not to have amphetamine-like properties in rodents even at high doses. Similarly, PMMA did not substitute for the psychedelic DOM. On the other hand, in contrast to PMA, PMMA fully substituted for MDMA in drug discrimination tests in rodents, despite not having MDMA-like psychoactive effects in humans. In any case, PMMA is said to lack the amphetamine- or stimulant-like properties of MDMA.

PMMA produces serotonergic neurotoxicity comparable to that of PMA but much less than that of MDMA in rats.

Monoamine release of PMMA and related agents (EC_{50}, nM)
Compound	5-HT	NE	DA	Ref
d-Amphetamine	698–1,765	6.6–7.2	5.8–24.8	
d-Methamphetamine	736–1,292	12.3–13.8	8.5–24.5	
2-Methoxyamphetamine	ND	473	1,478	
3-Methoxyamphetamine	ND	58.0	103	
para-Methoxyamphetamine (PMA)	ND	166	867	
PMMA	ND	ND	ND	ND
(S)-PMMA	41	147	1,000	
(R)-PMMA	134	>14,000	1,600	
4-Methylamphetamine (4-MA)	53.4	22.2	44.1	
4-Methylmethamphetamine (4-MMA)	67.4	66.9	41.3	
para-Chloroamphetamine (PCA)	28.3	23.5–26.2	42.2–68.5	
para-Chloromethamphetamine (PCMA)	29.9	36.5	54.7	
Methedrone (4-MeO-MC)	120–195	111	506–881	
Mephedrone (4-MMC)	118.3–122	58–62.7	49.1–51	
Notes: The smaller the value, the more strongly the drug releases the neurotransmitter. The assays were done in rat brain synaptosomes and human potencies may be different. See also Monoamine releasing agent § Activity profiles for a larger table with more compounds. Refs:

=== Pharmacokinetics ===
Pholedrine is the major metabolite of PMMA in rats. Other metabolites include para-methoxyamphetamine (PMA), oxilofrine, and others. CYP2D6 is a major enzyme involved in the O-demethylation of PMMA.

== Chemistry ==
=== Synthesis ===
The chemical synthesis of PMMA has been described.

=== Detection ===
PMMA can be detected with reagent testing kits.

=== Analogues ===
Analogues of PMMA include para-methoxyamphetamine (PMA), para-methoxy-N-ethylamphetamine (PMEA), 4-methylthio-N-methylamphetamine (4-MTMA), 4-methyl-N-methylamphetamine (4-MMA; mephedrine), para-chloro-N-methylamphetamine (PCMA), 4-fluoro-N-methylamphetamine (4-FMA), methoxyphenamine (2-methoxy-N-methylamphetamine; OMMA), 3-methoxy-N-methylamphetamine (MMMA), and methedrone (4-methoxymethcathinone; bk-PMMA), among others.

== History ==
PMMA was first described in the scientific literature by at least 1984. Subsequently, it was described in greater detail by Alexander Shulgin in his books PiHKAL (Phenethylamines I Have Known and Loved) and The Shulgin Index, Volume One: Psychedelic Phenethylamines and Related Compounds in 2011.

== Society and culture ==
=== Recreational use ===
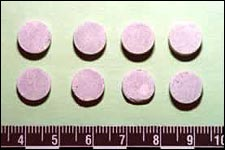
Tablets of PMMA recovered by the U.S. Drug Enforcement Administration

PMMA has been found in tablets and capsules of the MDMA sold as "ecstasy". A number of deaths have been attributed to tablets sold as ecstasy that contained other substances, such as PMMA's structural analog, PMA. Death can occur when an ecstasy user believes they are consuming recreational doses of MDMA, when they are in fact consuming a lethal dose of another substance with similar effects. PMA is of particular concern because it not only causes a release of serotonin but also acts as a monoamine oxidase inhibitor (MAOI); if it is used in combination with MDMA or another MDMA-like substance, serotonin syndrome can result.

==== Deaths ====
In January 2011, the Norwegian Broadcasting Corporation reported that Norway had seen 12 deaths related to PMMA over the course of six months. In March 2011, Dutch media reported that there had been four deaths in the province of Limburg since November 2010. In April 2011, Icelandic media reported the death of a young woman that may have been connected to PMMA.

In 2011, four deaths were recorded in Scotland as a result of ecstasy tablets which also contained PMMA.

In January 2012, a number of ecstasy-related deaths in Canada in the previous year were linked to PMMA overdoses. In the single year, approximately 45 exposures occurred, resulting in 21 deaths. Cases were centred primarily in Calgary and Vancouver.

In September 2012, the deaths of two men in County Cork, Ireland, have been linked to PMMA overdoses. In the same month, the death of a man in Queensland, Australia was attributed to PMMA.

In June 2013 a PMMA-related death occurred in the Dutch city of 's-Hertogenbosch. Two months later, In August 2013, another possibly PMMA-related death occurred in the nearby town of Sliedrecht.

In January 2015 in the UK four people died, suspected of taking ecstasy containing PMMA. In the same month, in Sweden, another man died from ecstasy laced with PMMA.

In May 2015 a young woman died in Dublin, Ireland, after taking what is suspected to be PMMA.

In April 2016 four young Argentines and one Uruguayan died during a massive rave called "Time Warp" in Buenos Aires and five more were hospitalized. PMMA was found in their bodies.

=== Legal status ===
==== United Kingdom ====
PMMA is controlled as a Schedule 1, Class A drug in the UK.

==== United States ====
On June 25, 2021, the DEA finalized a rule placing PMMA on the Controlled Substance Act federal Schedule as a Schedule I substance effective July 26, 2021.

== See also ==
- Substituted amphetamine
- Substituted methoxyphenethylamine
- Venlafaxine
