= Hydroxyphenethylamine =

Hydroxyphenethylamine may refer to:

- Phenylethanolamine (β-hydroxyphenethylamine)
- meta-Tyramine (3-hydroxyphenethylamine)
- Tyramine (4-hydroxyphenethylamine)
