= Para-Methoxyamphetamine =

Chemical compound

PMA

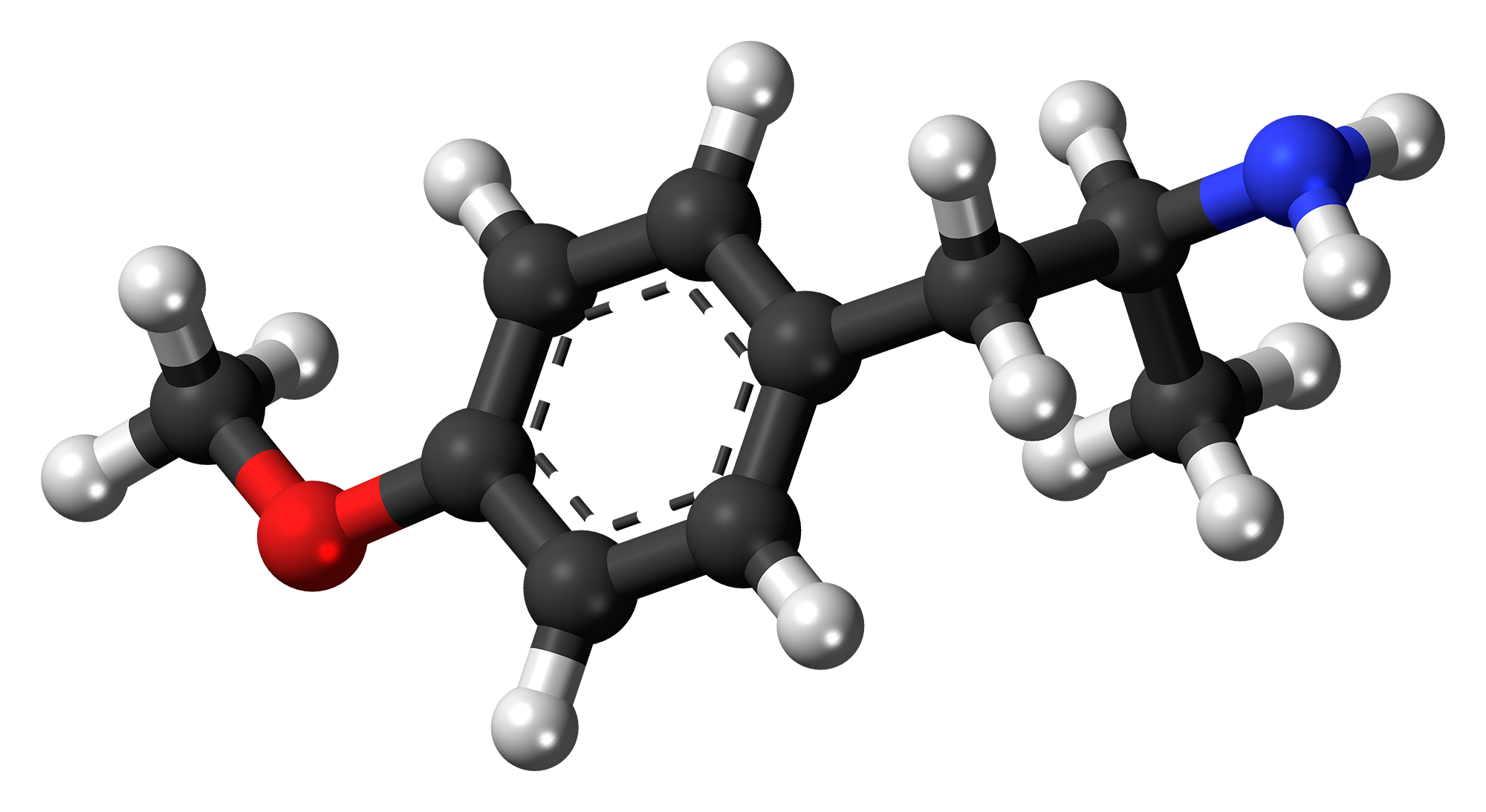

Clinical data
- Other names: para-Methoxyamphetamine; p-Methoxyamphetamine; PMA; 4-Methoxyamphetamine; 4-MA; 4-MeO-A; 4-OMe-PIA
- Routes of administration: Oral
- Drug class: Serotonin releasing agent; Serotonin receptor modulator; Serotonergic psychedelic; Hallucinogen; Monoamine oxidase inhibitor
- ATC code: None

Legal status
- Legal status: AU: S9 (Prohibited substance); BR: Class F2 (Prohibited psychotropics); CA: Schedule I; DE: Anlage I (Authorized scientific use only); UK: Class A; US: Schedule I; UN: Psychotropic Schedule I; In general illegal unless for medical, therapeutic or scientific use.

Pharmacokinetic data
- Onset of action: 1 hour
- Duration of action: "Short" (~5 hours)

Identifiers
- IUPAC name: 1-(4-methoxyphenyl)propan-2-amine
- CAS Number: 64-13-1
- PubChem CID: 31721
- DrugBank: DB01472
- ChemSpider: 29417
- UNII: OVB8F8P39Q
- KEGG: C22811
- ChEMBL: ChEMBL278663
- CompTox Dashboard (EPA): DTXSID7040578
- ECHA InfoCard: 100.000.525

Chemical and physical data
- Formula: C_{10}H_{15}NO
- Molar mass: 165.236 g·mol^{−1}
- 3D model (JSmol): Interactive image
- SMILES: C1=CC(=CC=C1CC(C)N)OC
- InChI: InChI=1S/C10H15NO/c1-8(11)7-9-3-5-10(12-2)6-4-9/h3-6,8H,7,11H2,1-2H3; Key:NEGYEDYHPHMHGK-UHFFFAOYSA-N

para-Methoxyamphetamine (PMA), also known as 4-methoxyamphetamine (4-MA), is a designer drug of the amphetamine class with serotonergic effects. Unlike other similar drugs of this family, PMA does not produce stimulant, euphoriant, or entactogenic effects, and behaves more like an antidepressant in comparison, though it does have some psychedelic properties.

PMA has been found in black market tablets sold as MDMA (ecstasy) although its effects are markedly different compared to those of MDMA. The consequences of such deception have often included hospitalization and death for unwitting users. PMA is commonly synthesized from anethole, the essential oil of anise and fennel, mainly because the starting material for MDMA and MDA, safrole (a major component of the essential oil of sassafras), has become less available due to increasing government controls, causing illicit drug manufacturers to make PMA as an alternative.

== Use and effects ==
In his book PiHKAL (Phenethylamines I Have Known and Loved), Alexander Shulgin lists PMA's dose as 50 to 80 mg orally and its duration as "short". In the provided experience reports, the onset was given as 1 hour and the duration as about 5 hours. The effects of PMA have been reported to include hypertension, diethyltryptamine (DET)-reminiscent effects, distinct after-images, some paresthesia, "intoxication" or alcohol-like intoxication, and no psychedelic effects. In clinical studies, PMA produced excitation, other central effects, and sympathomimetic effects, but caused no hallucinogenic effects.

== Adverse effects ==
PMA has been associated with numerous adverse reactions including death. Effects of PMA ingestion include many effects of the hallucinogenic amphetamines including accelerated and irregular heartbeat, blurred vision, and a strong feeling of intoxication that is often unpleasant. At high doses unpleasant effects such as nausea and vomiting, severe hyperthermia and hallucinations may occur. The effects of PMA also seem to be much more unpredictable and variable between individuals than those of MDMA, and sensitive individuals may die from a dose of PMA by which a less susceptible person might only be mildly affected. While PMA alone may cause significant toxicity, the combination of PMA with MDMA has a synergistic effect that seems to be particularly hazardous. Since PMA has a slow onset of effects, several deaths have occurred where individuals have taken a pill containing PMA, followed by a pill containing MDMA some time afterwards due to thinking that the first pill was not active.

== Overdose ==
PMA overdose can be a serious medical emergency that may occur at only slightly above the usual recreational dose range, especially if PMA is mixed with other stimulant drugs such as cocaine or MDMA. Characteristic symptoms are pronounced hyperthermia, tachycardia, and hypertension, along with agitation, confusion, and convulsions. PMA overdose also tends to cause hypoglycemia and hyperkalemia, which can help to distinguish it from MDMA overdose. Complications can sometimes include more serious symptoms such as rhabdomyolysis and cerebral hemorrhage, requiring emergency surgery. There is no specific antidote, so treatment is symptomatic, and usually includes both external cooling, and internal cooling via IV infusion of cooled saline. Benzodiazepines are used initially to control convulsions, with stronger anticonvulsants such as phenytoin or thiopental used if convulsions continue. Blood pressure can be lowered either with a combination of alpha blockers and beta blockers (or a mixed alpha/beta blocker), or with other drugs such as nifedipine or nitroprusside. Serotonin antagonists and dantrolene may be used as required. Despite the seriousness of the condition, the majority of patients survive if treatment is given in time, however, patients with a core body temperature over 40 °C at presentation tend to have a poor prognosis.

== Pharmacology ==
=== Pharmacodynamics ===
==== Actions ====
Monoamine release of PMA and related agents (EC_{50}, nM)
| Compound | 5-HT | NE | DA | Ref |
|---|---|---|---|---|
| d-Amphetamine | 698–1,765 | 6.6–7.2 | 5.8–24.8 | |
| d-Methamphetamine | 736–1,292 | 12.3–13.8 | 8.5–24.5 | |
| 2-Methoxyamphetamine | ND | 473 | 1,478 | |
| 3-Methoxyamphetamine | ND | 58.0 | 103 | |
| para-Methoxyamphetamine (PMA) | ND | 166 | 867 | |
| PMMA | ND | ND | ND | ND |
| (S)-PMMA | 41 | 147 | 1,000 | |
| (R)-PMMA | 134 | >14,000 | 1,600 | |
| 4-Methylamphetamine (4-MA) | 53.4 | 22.2 | 44.1 | |
| 4-Methylmethamphetamine (4-MMA) | 67.4 | 66.9 | 41.3 | |
| para-Chloroamphetamine (PCA) | 28.3 | 23.5–26.2 | 42.2–68.5 | |
| para-Chloromethamphetamine (PCMA) | 29.9 | 36.5 | 54.7 | |
| Methedrone (4-MeO-MC) | 120–195 | 111 | 506–881 | |
| Mephedrone (4-MMC) | 118.3–122 | 58–62.7 | 49.1–51 | |
Notes: The smaller the value, the more strongly the drug releases the neurotransmitter. The assays were done in rat brain synaptosomes and human potencies may be different. See also Monoamine releasing agent § Activity profiles for a larger table with more compounds. Refs:

PMA acts as a selective serotonin releasing agent (SSRA) with weak effects on dopamine and norepinephrine transporters. Its EC_{50} values for induction of monoamine release are 166 nM for dopamine and 867 nM for norepinephrine in rat brain synaptosomes, whereas serotonin was not reported. The drug has been found to robustly increase brain serotonin levels and to weakly increase brain dopamine levels in rodents in vivo. Relative to MDMA, PMA appears to be considerably less effective as a releaser of serotonin, with properties more akin to a serotonin reuptake inhibitor in comparison.

PMA has also been shown to act as a potent monoamine oxidase inhibitor (MAOI), specifically as a reversible inhibitor of the enzyme monoamine oxidase A (MAO-A) with no significant effects on monoamine oxidase B (MAO-B). The IC_{50} of PMA for MAO-A inhibition has been reported to be 300 to 600 nM.

PMA shows very low affinities for the serotonin 5-HT_{1A}, 5-HT_{2A}, and 5-HT_{2C} receptors. Its affinities (K_{i}) for these receptors have been reported to be >20,000 nM, 11,200 nM, and >13,000 nM, respectively. In another earlier study, PMA similarly showed very weak affinity for serotonin receptors, including the serotonin 5-HT_{1} and 5-HT_{2} receptors (K_{i} = 79,400 nM and 33,600 nM, respectively). On the other hand, PMA shows much higher affinities for the mouse and rat trace amine-associated receptor 1 (TAAR1).

==== Effects ====
PMA fails to substitute for the psychedelic drug DOM in rodent drug discrimination tests. It only partially substituted for the psychostimulant amphetamine in such tests. The drug did not substitute for MDMA in rodents, suggesting lack of entactogenic effects. PMA evokes robust hyperthermia in rodents while producing only modest hyperlocomotion and serotonergic neurotoxicity, substantially lower than that caused by MDMA, and only at very high doses. Accordingly, it is not self-administered by rodents unlike amphetamine and MDMA.

It appears that PMA elevates body temperatures dramatically; the cause of this property is suspected to be related to its ability to inhibit MAO-A and at the same time releasing large amounts of serotonin, effectively causing serotonin syndrome. Amphetamines, especially serotonergic analogues such as MDMA, are strongly contraindicated to take with MAOIs. Many amphetamines and adrenergic compounds raise body temperatures, whereas some tend to produce more euphoric activity or peripheral vasoconstriction, and may tend to favor one effect over another. It appears that PMA activates the hypothalamus much more strongly than MDMA and other drugs like ephedrine, thereby causing rapid increases in body temperature (which is the major cause of death in PMA mortalities). Many people taking PMA try to get rid of the heat by taking off their clothes, taking cold showers or wrapping themselves in wet towels, and even sometimes by shaving off their hair.

== Chemistry ==
=== Synthesis ===
The chemical synthesis of PMA has been described.

=== Analogues ===
Analogues of PMA include para-methoxy-N-methylamphetamine (PMMA), para-methoxy-N-ethylamphetamine (PMEA), 4-ethoxyamphetamine (4-ETA), 4-methylthioamphetamine (4-MTA), 4-methylamphetamine (4-MA), 4-hydroxyamphetamine, para-chloroamphetamine (PCA), 2-methoxyamphetamine (OMA), 3-methoxyamphetamine (MMA), 3-methoxy-4-methylamphetamine (MMA), 3,4-dimethoxyamphetamine (3,4-DMA), and 1-aminomethyl-5-methoxyindane (AMMI), among others. Anisomycin contains PMA within its chemical structure.

== History ==
PMA was first described in the scientific literature by T. Patrick and colleagues by 1946. It first came into circulation as a recreational drug in the early 1970s, where it was used intentionally as a substitute for the psychedelic drug LSD. The drug went by the street names of "Chicken Powder" and "Chicken Yellow" and was found to be the cause of a number of drug overdose deaths (the doses taken being in the range of hundreds of milligrams) in the United States and Canada from that time. Between 1974 and the mid-1990s, there appear to have been no known fatalities from PMA.

Several deaths reported as MDMA-induced in Australia in the mid-1990s are now considered to have been caused by PMA, the users unaware that they were ingesting PMA and not MDMA as they had intended. There have been a number of PMA-induced deaths around the world since then.

In July 2013, seven deaths in Scotland were linked to tablets containing PMA that had been mis-sold as ecstasy and which had the Rolex crown logo on them. Several deaths in Northern Ireland, Particularly East Belfast, were also linked to "Green Rolex" pills during that month.

In 2014, 2015, and early 2016, PMA sold as ecstasy was the cause of more deaths in the United States, United Kingdom, Netherlands, and Argentina. The pills containing the drug were reported to be red triangular tablets with a "Superman" logo.

The Red Ferarri pills are a new press of the Superman logo tablets that were reported to be found in Germany and Norway from 2016 to 2017.

== Society and culture ==
=== Legal status ===
==== International ====
PMA is a Schedule I drug under the Convention on Psychotropic Substances.

==== Australia ====
PMA is considered a Schedule 9 prohibited substance in Australia under the Poisons Standard (October 2015). A Schedule 9 substance is a substance which may be abused or misused, the manufacture, possession, sale or use of which should be prohibited by law except when required for medical or scientific research, or for analytical, teaching or training purposes with approval of Commonwealth and/or State or Territory Health Authorities.

==== Canada ====
PMA is a Schedule I controlled substance in Canada.

==== Finland ====
Substance is scheduled in decree of the substances, preparations and plants considered to be narcotic drugs.

==== Germany ====
PMA is part of the Appendix 1 of the Betäubungsmittelgesetz. Therefore, owning and distribution of PMA is illegal.

==== Netherlands ====
On 13 June 2012 Edith Schippers, Dutch Minister of Health, Welfare and Sport, revoked the legality of PMA in the Netherlands after five deaths were reported in that year.

==== United Kingdom ====
PMA is a Class A drug in the UK.

==== United States ====
PMA is classified as a Schedule I hallucinogen under the Controlled Substances Act in the United States.

=== Economics ===
==== Distribution ====
Because PMA is given out through the same venues and distribution channels that MDMA tablets are, the risk of being severely injured, hospitalized or even dying from use of ecstasy increases significantly when a batch of ecstasy pills containing PMA starts to be sold in a particular area. PMA pills could be a variety of colours or imprints, and there is no way of knowing just from the appearance of a pill what drug(s) it might contain. Notable batches of pills containing PMA have included Louis Vuitton, Mitsubishi Turbo, Blue Transformers, Red/Blue Mitsubishi and Yellow Euro pills. Also PMA has been found in powder form.

==== Analogues ====
Four analogues of PMA have been reported to be sold on the black market, including PMMA, PMEA, 4-ETA and 4-MTA. These are the N-methyl, N-ethyl, 4-ethoxy and 4-methylthio analogues of PMA, respectively. PMMA and PMEA are anecdotally weaker, more "ecstasy-like" and somewhat less dangerous than PMA itself, but can still produce nausea and hyperthermia similar to that produced by PMA, albeit at slightly higher doses. 4-EtOA was briefly sold in Canada in the 1970s, but little is known about it. 4-MTA, however, is even more dangerous than PMA and produces strong serotonergic effects and intense hyperthermia, but with little to no euphoria, and was implicated in several deaths in the late 1990s.

=== Drug test false positives ===
PMA is formed as a metabolite by mebeverine and can result in false positives on drug tests for "ecstasy".

== See also ==
- Substituted amphetamine
- Substituted methoxyphenethylamine
