= PMMA =

PMMA may refer to:

- para-Methoxymethamphetamine, a stimulant drug
- Philippine Merchant Marine Academy
- Poly(methyl methacrylate), a transparent thermoplastic often used as a glass substitute
