= PMEA =

PMEA could refer to:

- Para-Methoxy-N-ethylamphetamine
- Pennsylvania Music Educators Association
