= 3-Methoxyamphetamine =

Stimulant drug of the amphetamine class

Clinical data
- Other names: 3-MA; 3-MeO-A; meta-Methoxyamphetamine; MMA
- Routes of administration: Oral
- Drug class: Serotonin–norepinephrine–dopamine releasing agent; Sympathomimetic
- ATC code: None

Identifiers
- IUPAC name: 1-(3-methoxyphenyl)propan-2-amine
- CAS Number: 17862-85-0
- PubChem CID: 152234
- ChemSpider: 134180
- UNII: C2B7C98LY8
- ChEMBL: ChEMBL16247
- CompTox Dashboard (EPA): DTXSID00939104

Chemical and physical data
- Formula: C_{10}H_{15}NO
- Molar mass: 165.236 g·mol^{−1}
- 3D model (JSmol): Interactive image
- SMILES: NC(C)CC1=CC=CC(OC)=C1
- InChI: InChI=1S/C10H15NO/c1-8(11)6-9-4-3-5-10(7-9)12-2/h3-5,7-8H,6,11H2,1-2H3; Key:VEJWNIYARKAHFI-UHFFFAOYSA-N

3-Methoxyamphetamine (3-MA), also known as meta-methoxyamphetamine (MMA), is a monoamine releasing agent (MRA) of the amphetamine family. It is a positional isomer of para-methoxyamphetamine (PMA; 4-methoxyamphetamine). The drug has been encountered as a novel designer drug.

== Use and effects ==
According to Alexander Shulgin, 3-MA showed no central or psychedelic effects in humans at a total dose of 50 mg (25 mg orally twice separated by 3 hours). However, sympathomimetic effects have occurred with the drug at an oral dose of 25 mg in humans.

== Pharmacology ==
=== Pharmacodynamics ===
3-MA is a combined serotonin–norepinephrine–dopamine releasing agent (SNDRA) rather than a fairly selective serotonin releasing agent (SSRA) like the related drug para-methoxyamphetamine (PMA; 4-MA). Its EC_{50} values for induction of monoamine release were reported to be 58 nM for norepinephrine and 103 nM for dopamine in rat brain synaptosomes, whereas the value for serotonin was not reported. The activity of 3-MA as a monoamine oxidase inhibitor (MAOI) has been studied, with it showing less MAOI activity than PMA.

The drug has shown relatively low affinity for serotonin receptors in the rat stomach fundus strip, intermediate between amphetamine and amphetamine psychedelics like DOM and DOB. In another study, its affinities (K_{i}) for the serotonin 5-HT_{1} and 5-HT_{2} receptors were 2,660 nM and 7,850 nM, respectively. 3-MA is also a weak agonist of the human trace amine-associated receptor 1 (TAAR1), with micromolar potency.

3-MA has similar effects in animal drug discrimination tests to PMA. It produced hyperlocomotion, a psychostimulant-like effect, in rodents similarly to amphetamine and PMA. It also produced hyperthermia and myoclonus, which are serotonin syndrome-associated effects, in rodents similarly to PMA.

=== Pharmacokinetics ===
The metabolism and metabolites of 3-MA have been described. It produces gepefrine (3-hydroxyamphetamine), a sympathomimetic agent, as one of its major metabolites.

== Chemistry ==
=== Synthesis ===
The chemical synthesis of 3-MA has been described.

=== Analogues ===
The 2-aminoindane analogue of 3-MA is 5-methoxy-2-aminoindane (MEAI; 5-MeO-AI).

== History ==
3-MA has appeared on the illicit market as a designer drug alternative to MDMA similarly PMA in the late 1980s and early 1990s, although far more rarely than PMA. Subsequently, it reappeared on the market, specifically via online sellers, in December 2021.

== See also ==
- Substituted methoxyphenethylamine
- 2-Methoxyamphetamine (OMA)
- 3-Methylamphetamine (3-MA)
- 3-Fluoroamphetamine (3-FA)
- 3-Trifluoromethylamphetamine (Norfenfluramine)
- 3-Methoxy-4-methylamphetamine (MMA)
- 3-Methoxymethamphetamine (MMMA)
- 4-Ethoxyamphetamine (4-ETA)
- 3,4-Dimethoxyamphetamine (DMA)
