= Phenatine =

Amphetamine psychostimulant

Clinical data
- Trade names: Fenatine
- Other names: Phenatin; Fenatin; Fenatine; Nicotinoylamphetamine; N-Nicotinoylamphetamine; N-Nicotinoyl-β-phenylisopropylamine; N-(α-Methylphenethyl)nicotinamide; Perviton.
- Drug class: Psychostimulant; Amphetamine

Identifiers
- IUPAC name: N-(1-phenylpropan-2-yl)pyridine-3-carboxamide
- CAS Number: 139-68-4
- PubChem CID: 120640
- ChemSpider: 107702
- UNII: 90O34W851E
- CompTox Dashboard (EPA): DTXSID40930271

Chemical and physical data
- Formula: C_{15}H_{16}N_{2}O
- Molar mass: 240.306 g·mol^{−1}
- 3D model (JSmol): Interactive image
- SMILES: CC(CC1=CC=CC=C1)NC(=O)C2=CN=CC=C2
- InChI: InChI=1S/C15H16N2O/c1-12(10-13-6-3-2-4-7-13)17-15(18)14-8-5-9-16-11-14/h2-9,11-12H,10H2,1H3,(H,17,18); Key:KJRJJAZBUWXZFN-UHFFFAOYSA-N

Phenatine, or phenatin, also known as N-nicotinoylamphetamine and sold under the brand name Fenatine, is a psychostimulant of the amphetamine family which was developed and used in the Soviet Union. It was used in the treatment of depression, narcolepsy, post-encephalitis sequelae, alcoholic psychoses, asthenia, and other conditions.

== Chemistry ==
Phenatine is a condensation product of amphetamine (phenamine) and nicotinic acid (niacin; vitamin B_{3}). It was first described in the scientific literature by 1955.

=== Synthesis ===
Phenatine, the phosphate salt of β-phenylisopropylamide of nicotinic acid, is prepared in two stages. Nicotinoyl chloride is reacted with β-phenylisopropylamine in benzene to yield the amide, which is then treated with phosphoric acid in ethanol. The resulting phosphate crystallises from solution and is isolated by filtration.

== Pharmacology ==
Phenatine is described as having effects analogous to those of amphetamine. Phenatine was also said to enhance physical and mental performance. However, the drug was described as being a milder stimulant than amphetamine whilst supposedly being superior to amphetamine and other stimulants in various respects. It was claimed to be much less toxic than amphetamine, to have hypotensive rather than hypertensive effects (and hence to not be contraindicated in people with hypertension), and to have reduced rebound effects and addictive potential.

== Analogues ==
An analogue is methylphenatine. Another analogue is pyridoxiphen (pyridoxiphene; pyridoxylamphetamine), the condensation product of amphetamine and pyridoxine (vitamin B_{6}). Other relatives may include thiophenatine, propylphenamine, and phenylphenamine. Further analogues of phenatine and pyridoxphen include gamofen (the condensation product of amphetamine and γ-aminobutyric acid (GABA)), alafen (the condensation product of amphetamine and β-alanine), and pabofen (p-aminobenzoylamphetamine; linkage of amphetamine and p-aminobenzoic acid (PABA), an intermediate in the biosynthesis of folic acid (vitamin B_{9})), all of which show distinct pharmacological activity.

== See also ==
- Benzphetamine
- Clobenzorex
- Lisdexamfetamine
- N-t-BOC-MDMA
- List of Russian drugs
