= 3-Methoxy-4-methylamphetamine =

Psychedelic drug

MMA

Clinical data
- Other names: MMA; 3,4-MMA; 3-Methoxy-4-methylamphetamine; meta-Methoxy-para-methylamphetamine
- Routes of administration: Oral
- Drug class: Selective serotonin releasing agent; Putative Serotonin 5-HT_{2A} receptor agonist; Psychedelic drug; Hallucinogen
- ATC code: None

Legal status
- Legal status: DE: NpSG (Industrial and scientific use only); UK: Class A; US: Schedule I (isomer of PMMA)

Pharmacokinetic data
- Duration of action: "Long"

Identifiers
- IUPAC name: 1-(3-methoxy-4-methylphenyl)propan-2-amine
- CAS Number: 24160-29-0
- PubChem CID: 91253
- ChemSpider: 82402
- UNII: BHS67KQE5Q
- ChEMBL: ChEMBL47696
- CompTox Dashboard (EPA): DTXSID401007386

Chemical and physical data
- Formula: C_{11}H_{17}NO
- Molar mass: 179.263 g·mol^{−1}
- 3D model (JSmol): Interactive image
- SMILES: CC1=C(C=C(C=C1)CC(C)N)OC
- InChI: InChI=1S/C11H17NO/c1-8-4-5-10(6-9(2)12)7-11(8)13-3/h4-5,7,9H,6,12H2,1-3H3; Key:XDXMRSBXBOXSQW-UHFFFAOYSA-N

3-Methoxy-4-methylamphetamine (MMA) is a psychedelic and possible entactogen of the phenethylamine and amphetamine families. It is taken orally and has a long duration.

The drug appears to act as a selective serotonin releasing agent (SSRA) and serotonin 5-HT_{2A} receptor agonist. It produces entactogen- and psychedelic-like effects with mixed findings in terms of stimulant-like effects in rodents.

MMA was first synthesized in 1970 and was encountered as a street drug in Italy by 1974. It was then reassayed by David E. Nichols as a non-neurotoxic MDMA analogue in 1991.

== Use and effects ==
MMA's dose has been reported to be 40 to 60 mg orally and its duration to be "long". In addition, capsules containing 140 mg have been encountered as a designer drug. In terms of effects, the drug has been reported to be hallucinogenic and potentially "quite dypshoric".

== Pharmacology ==
=== Pharmacodynamics ===
MMA has been found to act as a potent and highly selective serotonin releasing agent (SSRA) and does not produce serotonergic neurotoxicity in rodents. MMA fully substitutes for MDMA and MBDB, partially substitutes for LSD, and does not substitute for amphetamine in rodent drug discrimination tests. However, in another study, MMA fully substituted for dextroamphetamine in such tests. The preceding data, along with MMA's psychedelic effects in humans, appear to confer a profile of MMA as a dual SSRA and serotonin 5-HT_{2A} receptor agonist.

== Chemistry ==
=== Synthesis ===
The chemical synthesis of MMA has been described.

=== Analogues ===
Analogues of MMA include 3-methoxyamphetamine (3-MA or MMA), 3-methoxymethamphetamine (3-MMA or MMMA), 4-methylamphetamine (4-MA), 4-methylmethamphetamine (4-MMA), 3,4-dimethoxyamphetamine (3,4-DMA), and xylopropamine (3,4-dimethylamphetamine), among others. The N-methyl derivative of MMA, N-Me-3,4-MMA, was inactive at a dose of 100 mg orally. The 2-aminoindane analogue of MMA is 5-methoxy-6-methyl-2-aminoindane (MMAI).

== History ==
MMA was first described in the scientific literature by Beng T. Ho and colleagues by 1970. It was encountered as a novel designer recreational drug in Italy by 1974. Subsequently, the drug was reassayed by David E. Nichols as a non-neurotoxic MDMA analogue in 1991.

== Society and culture ==
=== Legal status ===
MMA is not an explicitly controlled substance in the United States. However, it could be considered a Schedule I controlled substance under the Federal Analogue Act.

== See also ==
- Substituted amphetamine
- Substituted methoxyphenethylamine
