= 3-Methoxymethamphetamine =

Chemical compound

Clinical data
- Other names: 3-Methoxy-N-methylamphetamine; meta-Methoxymethamphetamine; meta-Methoxy-N-methylamphetamine; MMMA; 3-MeO-MA; 3-MMA

Legal status
- Legal status: CA: Schedule I; DE: NpSG (Industrial and scientific use only); UK: Class A; US: Schedule I (isomer of PMMA)

Identifiers
- IUPAC name: 1-(3-methoxyphenyl)-N-methyl-propan-2-amine
- CAS Number: 93675-25-3
- PubChem CID: 130136
- ChemSpider: 115164
- UNII: 25DLK14QZJ
- CompTox Dashboard (EPA): DTXSID00924757

Chemical and physical data
- Formula: C_{11}H_{17}NO
- Molar mass: 179.263 g·mol^{−1}
- 3D model (JSmol): Interactive image
- SMILES: CNC(C)Cc(c1)cccc1OC
- InChI: InChI=1S/C11H17NO/c1-9(12-2)7-10-5-4-6-11(8-10)13-3/h4-6,8-9,12H,7H2,1-3H3; Key:USQWRDRXXKZFDI-UHFFFAOYSA-N

3-Methoxymethamphetamine, (3-MMA), also known as meta-methoxymethamphetamine (MMMA), is a psychoactive drug of the amphetamine family related to 3-methoxyamphetamine (3-MA or MMA) and to positional isomers like ortho-methoxymethamphetamine (OMMA) and para-methoxymethamphetamine (PMMA). It has been said that virtually nothing is known about the activity of 3-MMA. In any case, its N-demethylated analogue 3-MA is known to act as a serotonin–norepinephrine–dopamine releasing agent (SNDRA) and to produce associated effects like PMA-like interoceptive effects and stimulant-like effects in rodents. Alexander Shulgin has noted that N-methylation of amphetamines generally preserves such activities, in contrast to the case of psychedelic activity. The chemical synthesis of 3-MMA has been described.

== See also ==
- Substituted methoxyphenethylamine
- para-Methoxyamphetamine (PMA)
- Fenfluramine
- 2-Methoxymethamphetamine (OMMA; methoxyphenamine)
- 3-Chloromethamphetamine
- 3-Methoxy-4-methylamphetamine (MMA)
- 4-Fluoromethamphetamine (4-FMA)
- 4-Methylmethamphetamine (4-MMA)
