= Pyridoxiphen =

Chemical compound

Clinical data
- Other names: Amphetamine–pyridoxine condensation product; Phenamine–pyridoxine condensation product; Pyridoxyphen; Pyridoxiphene; Piridoksifen; Piridoksifena; Pyridoxylamphetamine

Identifiers
- IUPAC name: 4-(hydroxymethyl)-2-methyl-5-[(1-phenylpropan-2-ylamino)methyl]pyridin-3-ol
- PubChem CID: 121419
- ChemSpider: 108374

Chemical and physical data
- Formula: C_{17}H_{22}N_{2}O_{2}
- Molar mass: 286.375 g·mol^{−1}
- 3D model (JSmol): Interactive image
- SMILES: CC1=NC=C(C(=C1O)CO)CNC(C)CC2=CC=CC=C2
- InChI: InChI=1S/C17H22N2O2/c1-12(8-14-6-4-3-5-7-14)18-9-15-10-19-13(2)17(21)16(15)11-20/h3-7,10,12,18,20-21H,8-9,11H2,1-2H3; Key:UDDSBCOQRRHWBZ-UHFFFAOYSA-N

Pyridoxiphen, also known as amphetamine–pyridoxine condensation product or as pyridoxylamphetamine, is a drug of the substituted amphetamine family which was developed in the Soviet Union in the 1960s. It is the condensation product of amphetamine (phenamine) and pyridoxine (vitamin B_{6}). It was developed for potential treatment of central nervous system conditions. The drug has sympatholytic and hypotensive effects in animals. It is highly ionic and may not be able to cross the blood–brain barrier.

== See also ==
- Phenatine (N-nicotinoylamphetamine; amphetamine–niacin condensation product)
- List of Russian drugs
