= Prenylamine =

Chemical compound

Clinical data
- Other names: N-(3,3-diphenylpropyl)amphetamine
- Routes of administration: Oral
- ATC code: C01DX02 (WHO)

Legal status
- Legal status: In general: uncontrolled

Identifiers
- IUPAC name: (RS)-N-(1-methyl-2-phenylethyl)-3,3-diphenylpropan-1-amine
- CAS Number: 390-64-7
- PubChem CID: 9801
- ChemSpider: 9418
- UNII: K2OH82Z000
- ChEMBL: ChEMBL24072
- CompTox Dashboard (EPA): DTXSID0048555
- ECHA InfoCard: 100.006.246

Chemical and physical data
- Formula: C_{24}H_{27}N
- Molar mass: 329.487 g·mol^{−1}
- 3D model (JSmol): Interactive image
- SMILES: CC(Cc1ccccc1)NCCC(c2ccccc2)c3ccccc3
- InChI: InChI=1S/C24H27N/c1-20(19-21-11-5-2-6-12-21)25-18-17-24(22-13-7-3-8-14-22)23-15-9-4-10-16-23/h2-16,20,24-25H,17-19H2,1H3; Key:IFFPICMESYHZPQ-UHFFFAOYSA-N

Prenylamine (Segontin) is a calcium channel blocker of the amphetamine chemical class that was used as a vasodilator in the treatment of angina pectoris. It produces amphetamine as a metabolite.

== History ==
Prenylamine was introduced in the 1960s by German manufacturer Albert-Roussel pharma gmbh, which was acquired by Hoechst AG in 1974 and which in turn became part of Sanofi Aventis in 2005.

It was withdrawn from market worldwide in 1988 because it caused QT interval prolongation and torsades de pointes, greatly increasing the risk of sudden death. The cardiac side effects were not detected during clinical development, only becoming apparent after the drug was in wide use.

== Mechanism of action ==
Prenylamine has two primary molecular targets in humans: calmodulin and myosin light-chain kinase 2, found in skeletal and cardiac muscle. Pharmacologically, it decreases sympathetic stimulation on cardiac muscle, predominantly through partial depletion of catecholamines via competitive inhibition of reuptake by storage granules, leading to further depletion due to spontaneous leakage as a result of disturbance of equilibrium. This depletion mechanism is similar to that of reserpine because both agents target the same site on the storage granule; however, prenylamine shows a high affinity for cardiac tissue, while reserpine is more selective toward brain tissue.

Prenylamine slows cardiac metabolism via calcium transport delay by blockade of magnesium-dependent calcium transport ATPase. It demonstrates beta blocker–like activity that results in reduction of heart rate but shows an opposing effect on tracheal tissue response.
