= Fencamine =

Chemical compound

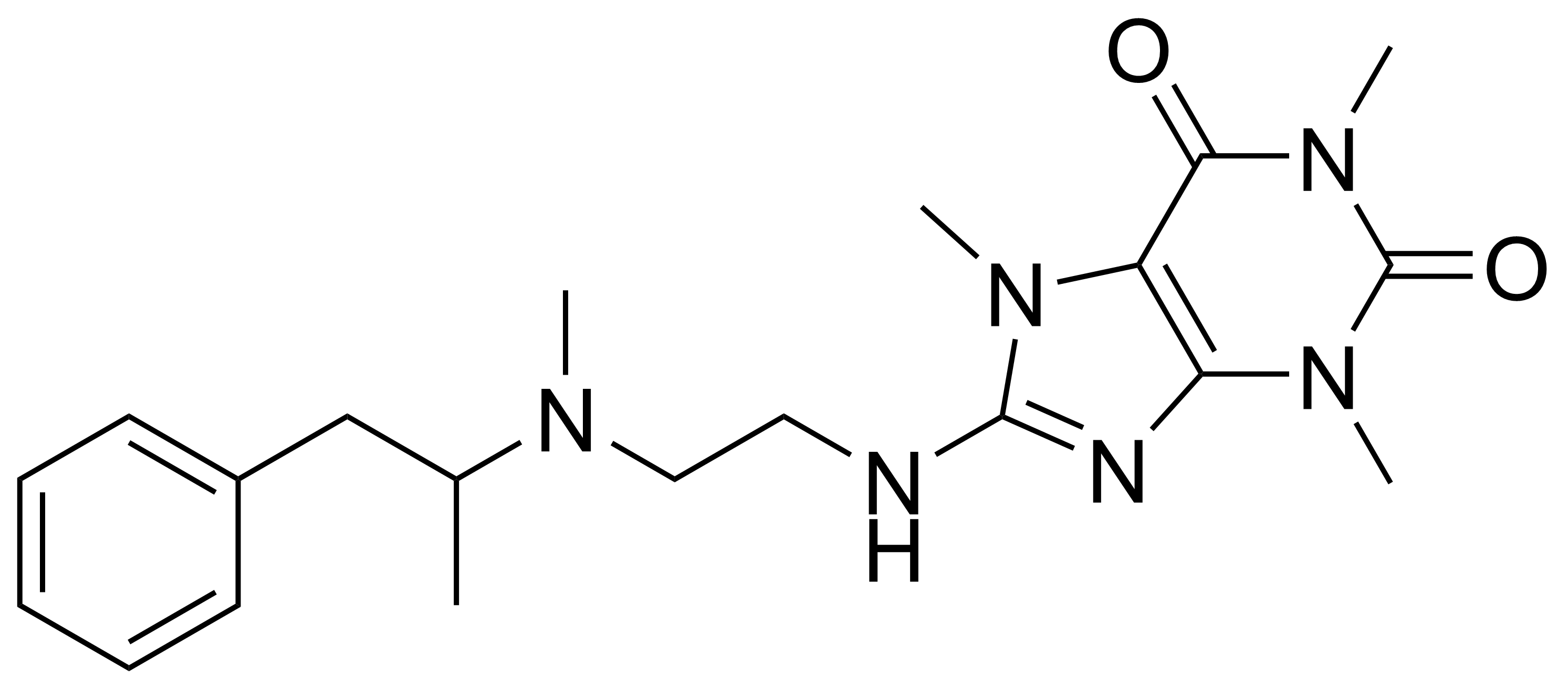

Clinical data
- Other names: Methamphetaminoethylcaffeine
- Routes of administration: Oral
- Drug class: Stimulant
- ATC code: none

Identifiers
- IUPAC name: 1,3,7-trimethyl-8-({2-[methyl(1-phenylpropan-2-yl)amino]ethyl}amino)-3,7-dihydro-1H-purine-2,6-dione
- CAS Number: 28947-50-4
- PubChem CID: 115374
- ChemSpider: 103208
- UNII: 3AO7AC8C6K
- CompTox Dashboard (EPA): DTXSID10276158

Chemical and physical data
- Formula: C_{20}H_{28}N_{6}O_{2}
- Molar mass: 384.484 g·mol^{−1}
- 3D model (JSmol): Interactive image
- SMILES: O=C2N(c1nc(n(c1C(=O)N2C)C)NCCN(C(C)Cc3ccccc3)C)C

Fencamine, also known as methamphetaminoethylcaffeine, is a psychostimulant drug of the amphetamine class. It is closely related to fenethylline. It is metabolized to methamphetamine and amphetamine. The drug also contains a caffeine moiety in its chemical structure.

Fencamine has been experimentally used in the treatment of depression. A clinical report on its use in prolonged reactive depression, an older psychiatric term referring to depressive conditions attributed to psychological stressors, was published in 1970.

A 1974 study described a method for determining fencamine in rat and human urine. According to a 2000 review summarizing the human results, approximately 32% of a 50 mg dose was excreted unchanged in urine within 48 hours.

== Names ==
The National Center for Advancing Translational Sciences Inxight Drugs database lists Altimina and Sicoclor as names for fencamine hydrochloride.

Yet the United Nations Office on Drugs and Crime's Multilingual Dictionary of Narcotic Drugs and Psychotropic Substances lists these names under fencamfamin.

Sicoclor was a registered medicinal product in Argentina until 2011.

== See also ==
- Substituted amphetamine
- Fenethylline
