= Mebeverine =

Chemical compound

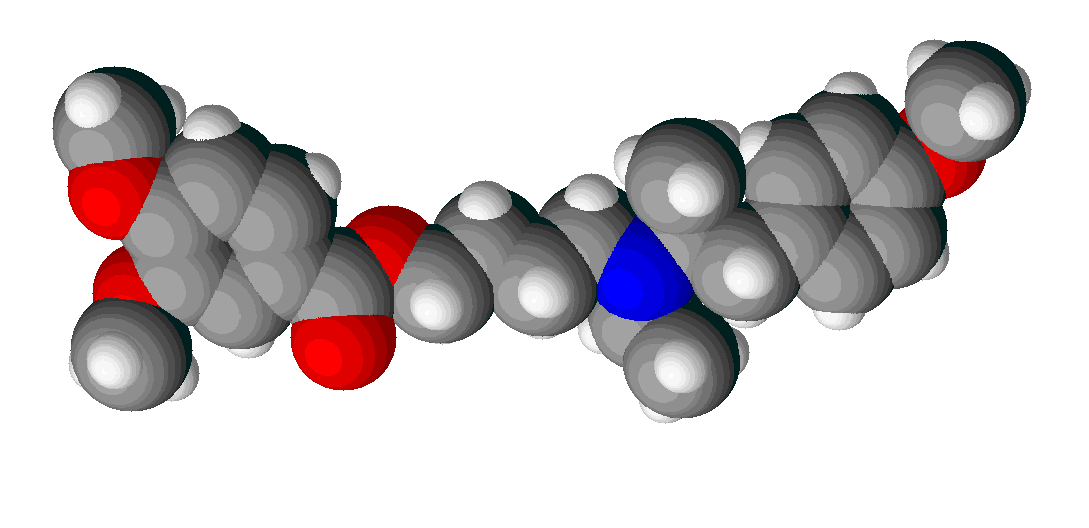

Clinical data
- AHFS/Drugs.com: International Drug Names
- Routes of administration: By mouth
- ATC code: A03AA04 (WHO)

Legal status
- Legal status: UK: P (Pharmacy medicines); US: Not approved; In general: ℞ (Prescription only)

Identifiers
- IUPAC name: (RS)-4-(Ethyl[1-(4-methoxyphenyl)propan-2-yl]amino)butyl 3,4-dimethoxybenzoate
- CAS Number: 3625-06-7; HCl: 2753-45-9
- PubChem CID: 4031
- DrugBank: DB12554
- ChemSpider: 3891
- UNII: 7F80CC3NNV; HCl: 15VZ5AL4JN
- KEGG: D04868
- ChEMBL: ChEMBL282121
- CompTox Dashboard (EPA): DTXSID6023238
- ECHA InfoCard: 100.020.756

Chemical and physical data
- Formula: C_{25}H_{35}NO_{5}
- Molar mass: 429.557 g·mol^{−1}
- 3D model (JSmol): Interactive image
- Chirality: Racemic mixture
- SMILES: O=C(OCCCCN(C(C)Cc1ccc(OC)cc1)CC)c2cc(OC)c(OC)cc2
- InChI: InChI=1S/C25H35NO5/c1-6-26(19(2)17-20-9-12-22(28-3)13-10-20)15-7-8-16-31-25(27)21-11-14-23(29-4)24(18-21)30-5/h9-14,18-19H,6-8,15-17H2,1-5H3; Key:VYVKHNNGDFVQGA-UHFFFAOYSA-N

Mebeverine is a drug used to alleviate some of the symptoms of irritable bowel syndrome. It works by relaxing the muscles in and around the gut.

== Medical use ==
Mebeverine is used to alleviate some of the symptoms of irritable bowel syndrome (IBS) and related conditions; specifically stomach pain and cramps, persistent diarrhoea, and flatulence.

Historically data from controlled clinical trials have not found a difference from placebo or statistically significant results in the global improvement of IBS. However, a 2022 systematic review found that Mebeverine is an effective treatment option in IBS, with a good safety profile and low frequency of adverse effects.

It has not been tested in pregnant women nor in pregnant animals so pregnant women should not take it; it is expressed at low levels in breast milk, while no adverse effects have been reported in infants, breastfeeding women should not take this drug.

== Adverse effects ==
Adverse effects include hypersensitivity reactions and allergic reactions, immune system disorders, skin disorders including hives, oedema and widespread rashes.

Additionally, the following adverse effects have been reported: heartburn, indigestion, tiredness, diarrhoea, constipation, loss of appetite, general malaise, dizziness, insomnia, headache, and decreased pulse rate.

It does not have systemic anticholinergic side effects.

Mebeverine can, on highly rare occasions, cause drug-induced acute angle closure glaucoma.

In a urine drug-screening test, mebeverine can affect a false positive result for amphetamines.

== Pharmacology ==
=== Mechanism of action ===
Mebeverine is an antispasmodic but its mechanism of action is not known; it appears to work directly on smooth muscle within the gastrointestinal tract and may have an anaesthetic effect, may affect calcium channels, and may affect muscarinic receptors.

=== Pharmacokinetics ===
It is metabolized mostly by esterases, and almost completely. The metabolites are excreted in urine.

Mebeverine exists in two enantiomeric forms. The commercially available product is a racemic mixture of them. A study in rats indicates that the two have different pharmacokinetic profiles.

The drug contains the psychoactive drugs moiety such as para-methoxy-N-ethylamphetamine (PMEA) and para-methoxyamphetamine (PMA) within its chemical structure and can form these drugs as minor active metabolites. This can result in false positives for "ecstasy" on drug tests.

== History ==
It is a second generation papaverine analog, and was first synthesized around the same time as verapamil.

It was first registered in 1965.

== Availability ==
Mebeverine is a generic drug and is available internationally under many brand names, such as Duspatalin as sold by Abbott or Mave and Mave SR by Opsonin Pharma.
