= 2-Methoxyamphetamine =

Chemical compound

Clinical data
- Other names: 2-MA; ortho-Methoxyamphetamine; o-Methoxyamphetamine; OMA
- Routes of administration: Oral
- ATC code: None

Identifiers
- IUPAC name: 1-(2-methoxyphenyl)propan-2-amine
- CAS Number: 15402-84-3
- PubChem CID: 159755
- ChemSpider: 140465
- UNII: 8NC8ZCZ6JE
- ChEMBL: ChEMBL16451
- CompTox Dashboard (EPA): DTXSID80934899

Chemical and physical data
- Formula: C_{10}H_{15}NO
- Molar mass: 165.236 g·mol^{−1}
- 3D model (JSmol): Interactive image
- SMILES: O(c1ccccc1CC(N)C)C
- InChI: InChI=1S/C10H15NO/c1-8(11)7-9-5-3-4-6-10(9)12-2/h3-6,8H,7,11H2,1-2H3; Key:VBAHFEPKESUPDE-UHFFFAOYSA-N

2-Methoxyamphetamine (2-MA), also known as ortho-methoxyamphetamine (OMA), is a drug of the amphetamine family. The properties and effects of 2-MA in humans are not known. It is substantially weaker in inhibiting the reuptake of and inducing the release of the monoamine neurotransmitters compared to related agents such as amphetamine, MMA, and PMA, and may instead act as a β-adrenergic receptor agonist similarly to its N-methylated analogue methoxyphenamine. The drug also shows relatively weak affinity for serotonin receptors, including the serotonin 5-HT_{1} and 5-HT_{2} receptors (K_{i} = 3,500 nM and 8,130 nM, respectively). 2-MA fully substitutes for dextroamphetamine in rodent drug discrimination tests. The chemical synthesis of 2-MA has been described.

== See also ==
- Substituted methoxyphenethylamine
- Methoxyphenamine
- 3-Methoxyamphetamine (MMA)
- 4-Methoxyamphetamine (PMA)
