= Meta-Tyramine =

Trace amine

meta-Tyramine

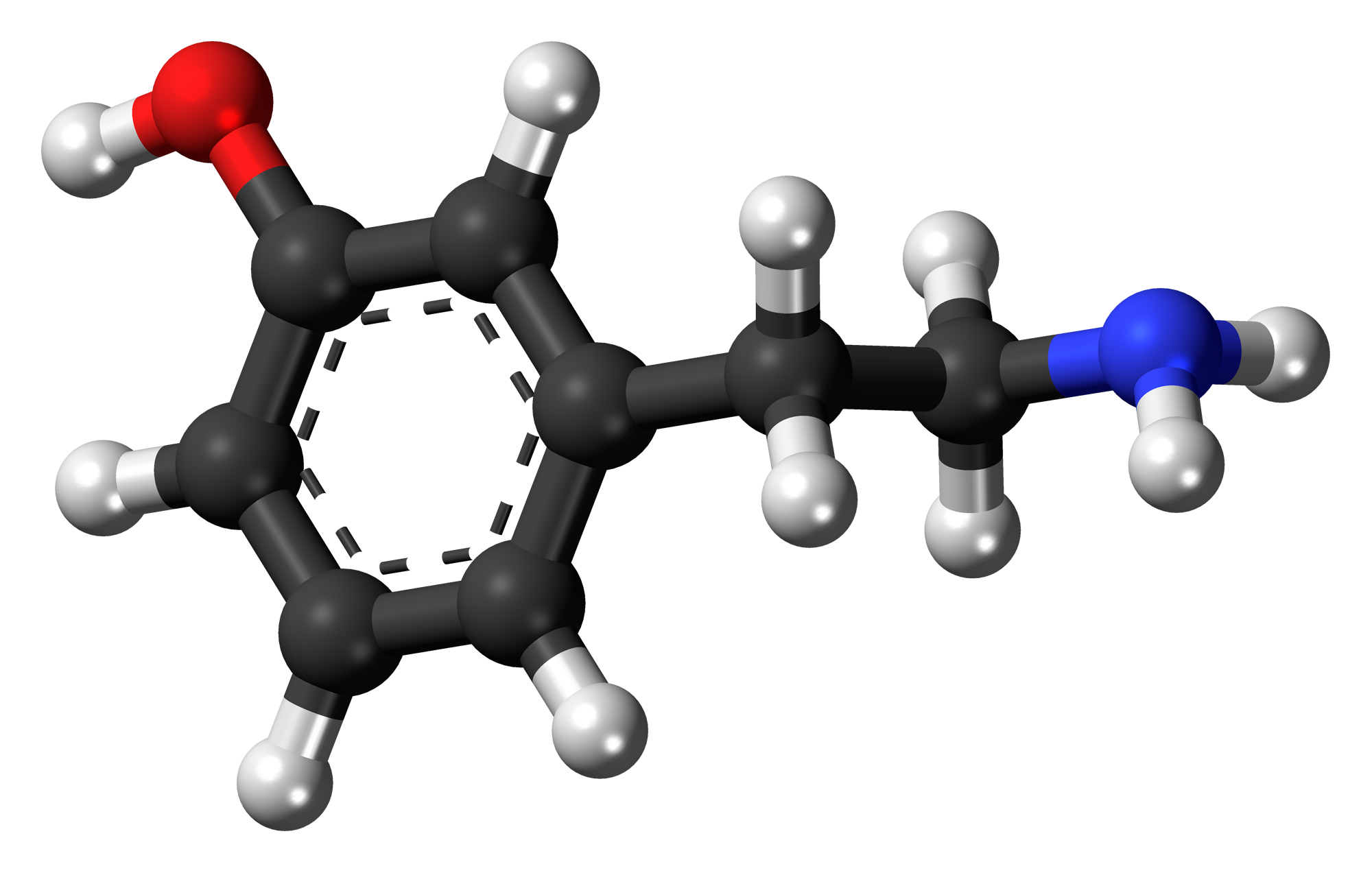

Names
- Preferred IUPAC name 3-(2-Aminoethyl)phenol
- Other names m-Tyramine; 3-Tyramine; 3-Hydroxyphenethylamine; 3-Hydroxyphenylethylamine; 3-OH-PEA

Identifiers
CAS Number	588-05-6
3D model (JSmol)	Interactive image
ChEBI	CHEBI:89626
ChemSpider	11008
ECHA InfoCard	100.197.155
PubChem CID	11492
UNII	K1OA38R0EZ
CompTox Dashboard (EPA)	DTXSID50207522
- InChI: InChI=1S/C8H11NO/c9-5-4-7-2-1-3-8(10)6-7/h1-3,6,10H,4-5,9H2
- SMILES: Oc1cc(ccc1)CCN

Properties
Chemical formula	C_{8}H_{11}NO
Molar mass	137.182 g·mol^{−1}
- Except where otherwise noted, data are given for materials in their standard state (at 25 °C [77 °F], 100 kPa). Infobox references

meta-Tyramine, also known as m-tyramine and 3-tyramine, as well as 3-hydroxyphenethylamine, is an endogenous trace amine neuromodulator and a structural analog of phenethylamine. It is a positional isomer of para-tyramine, and similarly to it, has effects on the adrenergic and dopaminergic systems.

meta-Tyramine is produced in humans via aromatic amino acid decarboxylase-mediated metabolism of meta-tyrosine. meta-Tyramine can be metabolized into dopamine via peripheral or brain CYP2D6 enzymes in humans.

== See also ==
- Substituted phenethylamine
- para-Tyramine
- 3-Methoxytyramine
- 3-Hydroxy-N,N-dimethylphenethylamine (LSM-6)
