= Methylephedrine =

Chemical compound

Clinical data
- Trade names: Metheph, Methy-F, Tybraine
- Other names: N-Methylephedrine; N-Methyl-(–)-ephedrine; L-Methylephedrine; N-Methyl-L-ephedrine; (−)-N-Methylephedrine; N,N-Dimethylnorephedrine
- Drug class: Sympathomimetic; Norepinephrine releasing agent; Bronchodilator; Nasal decongestant; Antitussive

Pharmacokinetic data
- Metabolites: • Methylephedrine N-oxide • Ephedrine • Norephedrine
- Excretion: Urine

Identifiers
- IUPAC name: (1R,2S)-2-(dimethylamino)-1-phenylpropan-1-ol
- CAS Number: 552-79-4
- PubChem CID: 64782
- DrugBank: DB11278
- ChemSpider: 58315
- UNII: SHS9PGQ2LS
- KEGG: D08206
- ChEBI: CHEBI:113556
- ChEMBL: ChEMBL445001
- CompTox Dashboard (EPA): DTXSID7045992
- ECHA InfoCard: 100.008.203

Chemical and physical data
- Formula: C_{11}H_{17}NO
- Molar mass: 179.263 g·mol^{−1}
- 3D model (JSmol): Interactive image
- SMILES: C[C@@H]([C@@H](C1=CC=CC=C1)O)N(C)C
- InChI: InChI=1S/C11H17NO/c1-9(12(2)3)11(13)10-7-5-4-6-8-10/h4-9,11,13H,1-3H3/t9-,11-/m0/s1; Key:FMCGSUUBYTWNDP-ONGXEEELSA-N

Methylephedrine, sold under the brand name Metheph among others, is a sympathomimetic medication described as an antiasthmatic agent and used to treat coughing and nasal congestion. It is reported to be used in various over-the-counter cough and cold preparations throughout the world, including Japan.

The drug is an ephedrine-like sympathomimetic and activates α- and β-adrenergic receptors. Chemically, it is a substituted amphetamine and is closely related to ephedrine.

Methylephedrine was discovered by 1927. It is mostly no longer marketed as a prescription drug. The drug is also found naturally as an alkaloid in Ephedra species including Ephedra sinica, Ephedra vulgaris, and Ephedra distachya.

== Side effects ==
Rarely, heart failure and stroke in association with use of methylephedrine have been reported.

Methylephedrine shows reinforcing effects, a measure of addiction and misuse potential, in monkeys.

== Pharmacology ==
=== Pharmacodynamics ===
Methylephedrine is a sympathomimetic and ephedrine-like agent. Ephedrine and related agents act as norepinephrine releasing agents and hence as indirectly acting sympathomimetics. In relation to this, methylephedrine stimulates α- and β-adrenergic receptors. The drug has bronchodilator and nasal decongestant effects.

The occupancy of the dopamine transporter (DAT) by racemic methylephedrine has been studied.

=== Pharmacokinetics ===
Methylephedrine is metabolized into ephedrine and norephedrine. It is excreted in urine 33 to 40% unchanged, 15% as methylephedrine N-oxide, and 8% as ephedrine after 24 hours.

== Chemistry ==
Methylephedrine, also known as (1R,2S)-β-hydroxy-N,N-dimethyl-α-methyl-β-phenethylamine and as (1R,2S)-β-hydroxy-N,N-dimethylamphetamine, is a substituted phenethylamine and amphetamine derivative. It is the N-methylated derivative of ephedrine ((1R,2S)-β-hydroxy-N-methylamphetamine).

A closely related compound and stereoisomer of methylephedrine is N-methylpseudoephedrine. Another related analogue is dimethylamphetamine (N,N-dimethylamphetamine), which is said to be a prodrug of methamphetamine and/or amphetamine. Other analogues include etafedrine (N-ethylephedrine) and cinnamedrine (N-cinnamylephedrine).

The experimental log P of methylephedrine is 2.47 and its predicted log P ranges from 1.7 to 1.74.

In organic chemistry, N-methylephedrine is used as a resolving agent and as a precursor to chiral supporting electrolytes, phase-transfer catalysts, and reducing agents.

== History ==
Methylephedrine was discovered via isolation from Ephedra by 1927.

== Society and culture ==
=== Names ===
Methylephedrine is the generic name of the drug and its BAN. In the case of the hydrochloride salt, its generic name is methylephedrine hydrochloride and this is its BANM. Brand names of methylephedrine include Metheph, Methy-F, and Tybraine, among others.

=== Recreational use ===
Similarly to ephedrine, methylephedrine may have misuse potential. The drug shows reinforcing effects in monkeys. It is one of the four constituents of BRON, a Japanese over-the-counter cough medicine with reports of misuse. However, addiction liability of BRON was attributed primarily to the codeine component. A case report of addiction to methylephedrine exists.

=== Use in sports and exercise ===
Methylephedrine is on the World Anti-Doping Agency's prohibited list.
