= Furfenorex =

Chemical compound

Clinical data
- ATC code: none

Identifiers
- IUPAC name: (RS)-N-(furan-2-ylmethyl)-N-methyl-1-phenylpropan-2-amine
- CAS Number: 3776-93-0; (+/-)-: 13445-60-8
- PubChem CID: 26762
- ChemSpider: 24935
- UNII: X83CZ0Y5TF; (+/-)-: 554JE75W4N
- ChEMBL: ChEMBL2107558
- CompTox Dashboard (EPA): DTXSID1057903

Chemical and physical data
- Formula: C_{15}H_{19}NO
- Molar mass: 229.323 g·mol^{−1}
- 3D model (JSmol): Interactive image
- SMILES: o1c(ccc1)CN(C(C)Cc2ccccc2)C
- InChI: InChI=1S/C15H19NO/c1-13(11-14-7-4-3-5-8-14)16(2)12-15-9-6-10-17-15/h3-10,13H,11-12H2,1-2H3; Key:DLGIIZAHQPTVCJ-UHFFFAOYSA-N

Furfenorex (Frugalan), also known as furfurylmethylamphetamine, is a stimulant drug which was developed in the 1960s and used as an appetite suppressant. It produces methamphetamine as a metabolite, and has been withdrawn from the market due to abuse potential.
