= Cinnamedrine =

Chemical compound

Clinical data
- Other names: Cinnamylephedrine; N-Cinnamylephedrine

Identifiers
- IUPAC name: 2-[methyl-[(E)-3-phenylprop-2-enyl]amino]-1-phenylpropan-1-ol
- CAS Number: 90-86-8
- PubChem CID: 5370611
- ChemSpider: 4521391
- UNII: Y1245J8012
- KEGG: D03510
- ChEMBL: ChEMBL2104503
- CompTox Dashboard (EPA): DTXSID8057851
- ECHA InfoCard: 100.001.838

Chemical and physical data
- Formula: C_{19}H_{23}NO
- Molar mass: 281.399 g·mol^{−1}
- 3D model (JSmol): Interactive image
- SMILES: CC(C(C1=CC=CC=C1)O)N(C)C/C=C/C2=CC=CC=C2
- InChI: InChI=1S/C19H23NO/c1-16(19(21)18-13-7-4-8-14-18)20(2)15-9-12-17-10-5-3-6-11-17/h3-14,16,19,21H,15H2,1-2H3/b12-9+; Key:YMJMZFPZRVMNCH-FMIVXFBMSA-N

Cinnamedrine (INN, USAN), also known as N-cinnamylephedrine, is a sympathomimetic drug with similar effects relative to those of ephedrine. It also has some local anesthetic activity. Cinnamedrine was previously used, in combination with analgesics, as an antispasmodic to treat dysmenorrhea in the over-the-counter drug Midol in the 1980s. There is a case series of the drug being abused as a psychostimulant.

== See also ==
- Methylephedrine
- Etafedrine
