= 4-Methylamphetamine =

Stimulant and anorectic drug of the amphetamine class

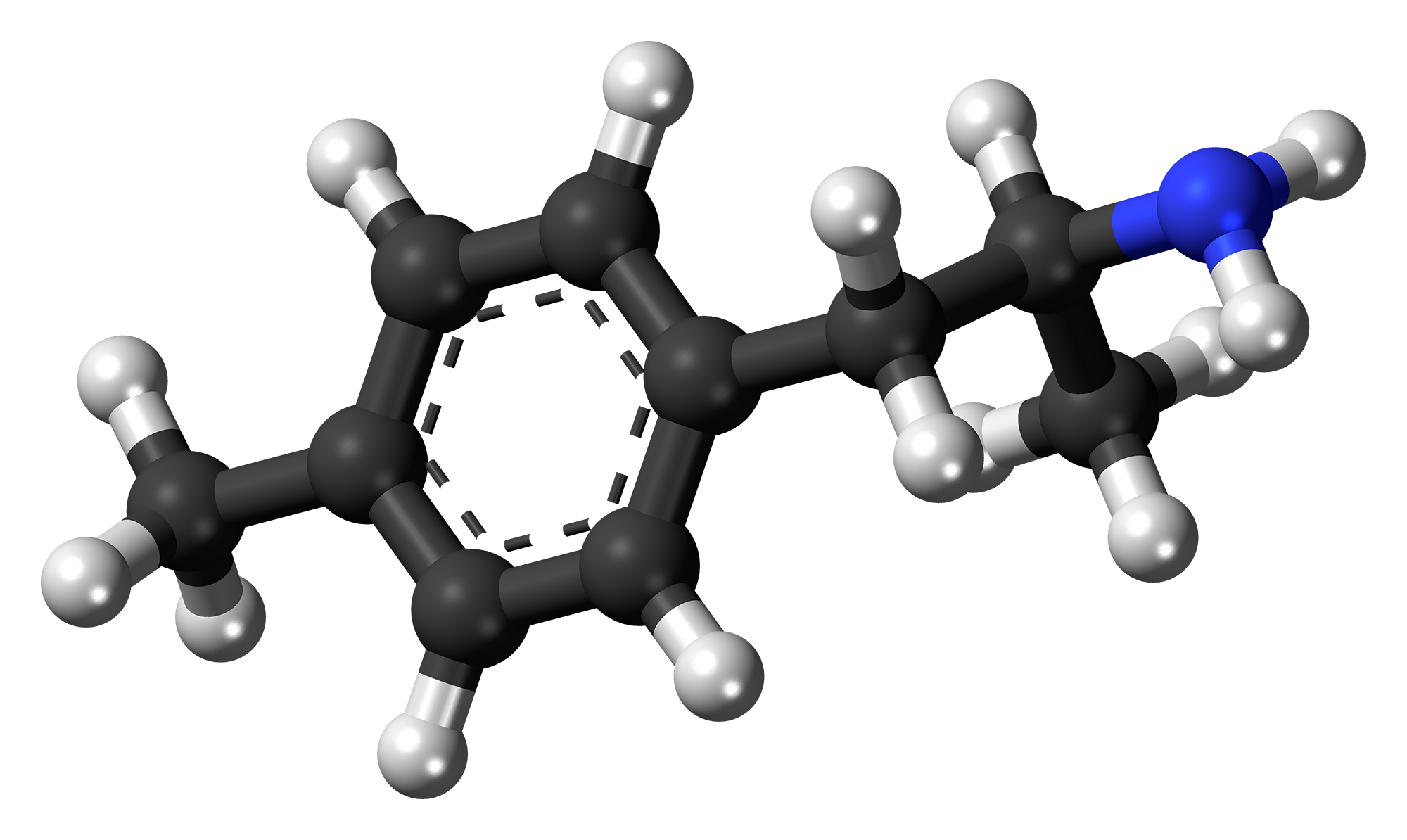

Clinical data
- Trade names: Aptrol (proposed)
- Other names: 4-MA; 4-MeA; para-Methylamphetamine; PMeA; PAL-313; PAL313; p-TAP; Normephedrine; 4-Me-PIA
- Routes of administration: Oral, intranasal, injection
- Drug class: Serotonin-norepinephrine-dopamine releasing agent (SNDRA); Serotonin receptor modulator; Stimulant; Anorectic; Psychedelic drug
- ATC code: None

Legal status
- Legal status: CA: Schedule I; DE: Anlage II (Authorized trade only, not prescriptible); UK: Class A; US: Schedule II (isomer of Methamphetamine)

Pharmacokinetic data
- Elimination half-life: 6–12 hours
- Excretion: Urine

Identifiers
- IUPAC name: 1-(4-methylphenyl)propan-2-amine
- CAS Number: 64-11-9
- PubChem CID: 199116
- ChemSpider: 172349
- UNII: 9E273KL7HS
- ChEMBL: ChEMBL166183
- CompTox Dashboard (EPA): DTXSID50945351

Chemical and physical data
- Formula: C_{10}H_{15}N
- Molar mass: 149.237 g·mol^{−1}
- 3D model (JSmol): Interactive image
- SMILES: NC(Cc1ccc(cc1)C)C
- InChI: InChI=1S/C10H15N/c1-8-3-5-10(6-4-8)7-9(2)11/h3-6,9H,7,11H2,1-2H3; Key:ZDHZDWSHLNBTEB-UHFFFAOYSA-N

4-Methylamphetamine (4-MA), also known as para-methylamphetamine (PMeA) and by the former proposed brand name Aptrol, is a stimulant and appetite suppressant drug of the phenethylamine and amphetamine families related to mephedrone. It is the amphetamine or β-desketo and N-desmethyl analogue of mephedrone (4-methylmethcathinone; 4-MMC).

== Use and effects ==
According to Alexander Shulgin in his books PiHKAL (Phenethylamines I Have Known and Loved) and The Shulgin Index, Volume One: Psychedelic Phenethylamines and Related Compounds, 4-MA is active at a dose of 75 mg orally and produces sympathomimetic effects and appetite loss but little stimulation. At a higher dose of 150 mg orally, the drug produces signs of mild toxicity such as salivation, coughing, and vomiting. It has been reported to produce psychedelic effects at a dose of 160 mg orally or 80 to 120 mg by intramuscular injection, with a plateau at 2 hours and baseline at 4 hours.

== Pharmacology ==
=== Pharmacodynamics ===
In vitro, 4-methylamphetamine acts as a potent and well-balanced serotonin, norepinephrine, and dopamine releasing agent (SNDRA) with EC_{50} values of 53.4 nM, 22.2 nM, and 44.1 nM at the serotonin, norepinephrine, and dopamine transporters, respectively.

However, more recent in vivo studies that involved performing microdialysis on rats showed a different trend. These studies showed that 4-methylamphetamine is much more potent at elevating serotonin (~18 x baseline) relative to dopamine (~5 x baseline). The authors speculated that this is because 5-HT release dampens DA release through some mechanism. For example, it was suggested that a possible cause for this could be activation of 5HT_{2C} receptors since this is known to inhibit DA release. In addition there are alternative explanations such as 5-HT release then going on to encourage GABA release, which has an inhibitory effect on DA neurons.

In addition to its activity as a monoamine releasing agent, 4-MA shows weak affinity for the serotonin 5-HT_{2} and 5-HT_{1} receptors (K_{i} = 3,360 nM and 14,800 nM, respectively). Its affinity for the serotonin 5-HT_{2} receptor was similar to that of 2,5-dimethoxyamphetamine (2,5-DMA) and was 10-fold greater than that of para-methoxyamphetamine (PMA) but was 34-fold lower than that of DOM. In more modern research, it showed affinities of 18,000 nM for the serotonin 5-HT_{1A} receptor, 3,300 nM for the serotonin 5-HT_{2A} receptor, and 6,300 nM for the serotonin 5-HT_{2C} receptor. In addition, it was an partial agonist of the serotonin 5-HT_{2A} and 5-HT_{2B} receptors, with EC_{50} (E_{max}) values of 3,300 nM (71%) and 860 nM (54%), respectively.

In animal studies, 4-MA was shown to have the lowest rate of self-administration out of a range of similar drugs tested (the others being 3-methylamphetamine, 4-fluoroamphetamine, and 3-fluoroamphetamine), likely as a result of having the highest potency for releasing serotonin relative to dopamine.

4-MA produces the head-twitch response in rodents similarly to para-chloroamphetamine (PCA).

Monoamine release of 4-methylamphetamine and related agents (EC_{50}, nM)
Compound	NE	DA	5-HT	Ref
Dextroamphetamine	6.6–10.2	5.8–24.8	698–1,765	
Dextromethamphetamine	12.3–14.3	8.5–40.4	736–1,292	
4-Methylamphetamine	22.2	44.1	53.4	
4-Methylmethamphetamine (mephedrine)	66.9	41.3	67.4	
4-Methylcathinone (normephedrone)	100	220	210	
4-Methylmethcathinone (mephedrone)	58–62.7	49.1–51	118.3–122	
Notes: The smaller the value, the more strongly the drug releases the neurotransmitter. The assays were done in rat brain synaptosomes and human potencies may be different. See also Monoamine releasing agent § Activity profiles for a larger table with more compounds. Refs:

== Chemistry ==
=== Synthesis ===
The chemical synthesis of 4-MA has been described.

=== Analogues ===
Analogues of 4-MA include amphetamine (A), 4-methyl-N-methylamphetamine (4-MMA), mephedrone (4-methyl-N-methylcathinone), 4-ethylamphetamine (4-EA), 4-propylamphetamine (4-PA), 2-methylamphetamine (2-MA), 3-methylamphetamine (3-MA), xylopropamine (3,4-dimethylamphetamine; 3-4-DMeA), 3-methoxy-4-methylamphetamine (MMA; 3,4-MMA), 4-methylphenylisobutylamine (4-MAB), 4-methylphenmetrazine, and 5-APDI, among others.

== Natural occurrence ==
4-Methylamphetamine has been reported to occur naturally as an alkaloid in Thymus quinquecostatus plants, although its content even in young leaves is quite low (3.11 ± 0.05% of the total alkaloid fraction. As the leaves mature, the substance ceases to be detectable.) However, despite the identification of the compound, it is difficult to say whether this study is accurate, given the low level of verifiability and the lack of reliable sources to support the claim.

== History ==
The psychedelic effects of 4-MA in humans were disclosed by Alexander Shulgin in his book The Shulgin Index, Volume One: Psychedelic Phenethylamines and Related Compounds. They were provided to Shulgin via personal communication with an individual named Igor.

== Society and culture ==
=== Deaths ===
More than a dozen deaths were reported throughout Europe in 2012 to 2013 after consumption of amphetamine ('speed') contaminated with 4-MA.

=== Legal status ===
==== United States ====
4-MA is not an explicitly controlled substance in the United States. However, it could be considered a Schedule I controlled substance under the Federal Analogue Act.

== Research ==
4-MA was investigated as an appetite suppressant in 1952 and was even given a trade name, Aptrol, but development was apparently never completed. More recently it has been reported as a novel designer drug.

== See also ==
- Substituted amphetamine
