= LSM6 =

Protein-coding gene in the species Homo sapiens

Identifiers
- Aliases: LSM6, YDR378C, LSM6 homolog, U6 small nuclear RNA and mRNA degradation associated
- External IDs: OMIM: 607286; MGI: 1925901; GeneCards: LSM6
Available structures
PDB	Ortholog search: PDBe RCSB
PDB	List of PDB id codes 3JCR

Gene location (Human)
Chr.	Chromosome 4 (human)
Band	4q31.22	Start	146,175,703 bp
Band	4q31.22	End	146,200,000 bp

Gene location (Mouse)
Chr.	Chromosome 8 (mouse)
Band	8|8 C1	Start	79,531,494 bp
Band	8|8 C1	End	79,547,769 bp
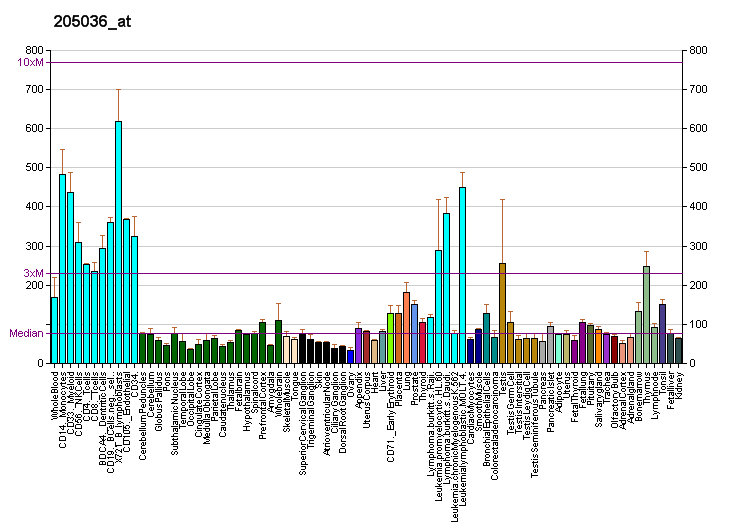
RNA expression pattern
Bgee	Human / Mouse (ortholog); Top expressed in: monocyte; granulocyte; appendix; lymph node; Achilles tendon; abdominal fat; ganglionic eminence; mucosa of transverse colon; right lung; islet of Langerhans / Top expressed in: hand; endocardial cushion; atrioventricular valve; abdominal wall; embryo; dermis; embryo; ventricular zone; epiblast; otic vesicle; More reference expression data
BioGPS	More reference expression data
Gene ontology
Molecular function	protein binding; RNA binding
Cellular component	cytoplasm; cytosol; nucleoplasm; small nuclear ribonucleoprotein complex; spliceosomal complex; extracellular exosome; nucleus; P-body; U6 snRNP; nucleolus; sno(s)RNA-containing ribonucleoprotein complex; U4/U6 x U5 tri-snRNP complex; U2-type precatalytic spliceosome; Lsm2-8 complex
Biological process	tRNA processing; mRNA processing; RNA splicing; exonucleolytic catabolism of deadenylated mRNA; rRNA processing; mRNA splicing, via spliceosome; maturation of SSU-rRNA
Sources:Amigo / QuickGO
Orthologs
Databases	NCBI: entry; OMA: entry
Species	Human	Mouse
Entrez	11157	78651
Ensembl	ENSG00000164167	ENSMUSG00000031683
UniProt	P62312	P62313
RefSeq (mRNA)	NM_007080	NM_001191004; NM_030145
RefSeq (protein)	NP_009011	NP_001177933; NP_084421
Location (UCSC)	Chr 4: 146.18 – 146.2 Mb	Chr 8: 79.53 – 79.55 Mb
PubMed search
- Wikidata
View/Edit Human	View/Edit Mouse

U6 snRNA-associated Sm-like protein LSm6 is a protein that in humans is encoded by the LSM6 gene.

Sm-like proteins were identified in a variety of organisms based on sequence homology with the Sm protein family (see SNRPD2; MIM 601061). Sm-like proteins contain the Sm sequence motif, which consists of 2 regions separated by a linker of variable length that folds as a loop.

The Sm-like proteins are thought to form a stable heteromer present in tri-snRNP particles, which are important for pre-mRNA splicing.[supplied by OMIM]
