= 3-Hydroxy-N,N-dimethylphenethylamine =

LSM-6

Clinical data
- Other names: LSM-6; LSM6
- Routes of administration: Unspecified
- Drug class: Adrenergic and serotonergic agent

Identifiers
- IUPAC name: 3-[2-(dimethylamino)ethyl]phenol
- PubChem CID: 3029884
- ChemSpider: 2295140
- CompTox Dashboard (EPA): DTXSID00901124

Chemical and physical data
- Formula: C_{10}H_{15}NO
- Molar mass: 165.236 g·mol^{−1}
- 3D model (JSmol): Interactive image
- SMILES: CN(C)CCC1=CC(=CC=C1)O
- InChI: InChI=1S/C10H15NO/c1-11(2)7-6-9-4-3-5-10(12)8-9/h3-5,8,12H,6-7H2,1-2H3; Key:DZZZXJVECUJDRB-UHFFFAOYSA-N

3-Hydroxy-N,N-dimethylphenethylamine (developmental code name LSM-6) is a drug of the phenethylamine family which was under development for the treatment of mood disorders but was never marketed. It is the N,N-dimethylated derivative of meta-tyramine (3-hydroxyphenethylamine). The drug is a naturally occurring constituent of Limacia plants and is described as an adrenergic and serotonergic agent. It may act as a monoamine releasing agent and/or reuptake inhibitor. LSM-6 has sympathomimetic effects. It was being developed in the 1990s in Malaysia. The drug reached the preclinical research stage of development prior to its discontinuation.

== See also ==
- List of investigational antidepressants
- Trichocereine (3,4,5-trimethoxy-N,N-dimethylphenethylamine)
- Macromerine (β-hydroxy-3,4-dimethoxy-N,N-dimethylphenethylamine)
- Dimethylamphetamine (N,N-dimethylamphetamine)
- Gepefrine (3-hydroxyamphetamine)
- Pholedrine (4-hydroxy-N-methylamphetamine)
- 4-Hydroxyamphetamine (norpholedrine)
