= Para-Ethoxyamphetamine =

Chemical compound

para-Ethoxyamphetamine

Clinical data
- Other names: 4-Ethoxyamphetamine; 4-EA; 4-ETA; 4-EtO-A; PEtOA
- Drug class: Psychoactive drug; Stimulant; Monoamine releasing agent; Monoamine oxidase inhibitor

Legal status
- Legal status: CA: Schedule I; US: Schedule I (isomer of PMMA)

Identifiers
- IUPAC name: 1-(4-ethoxyphenyl)propan-2-amine
- CAS Number: 129476-58-0
- PubChem CID: 125379
- ChemSpider: 111573
- UNII: C1417507NO
- ChEMBL: ChEMBL161985
- CompTox Dashboard (EPA): DTXSID40926412

Chemical and physical data
- Formula: C_{11}H_{17}NO
- Molar mass: 179.263 g·mol^{−1}
- 3D model (JSmol): Interactive image
- SMILES: O(c1ccc(cc1)CC(N)C)CC
- InChI: InChI=1S/C11H17NO/c1-3-13-11-6-4-10(5-7-11)8-9(2)12/h4-7,9H,3,8,12H2,1-2H3; Key:CCAMEVFYMFXHEN-UHFFFAOYSA-N

para-Ethoxyamphetamine (PEtOA), also known as 4-ethoxyamphetamine (4-EA, 4-ETA, or 4-EtO-A), is a psychoactive drug of the phenethylamine and amphetamine families which is closely related to para-methoxyamphetamine (PMA). It has similar effects to PMA in animal studies, although with slightly weaker stimulant effects. Like PMA, it has prominent MAOI activity, and is likely to have similar dangers associated with its use.

== See also ==
- Substituted methoxyphenethylamine
- para-Methoxyamphetamine (PMA)
- 2,5-Dimethoxy-4-ethoxyamphetamine (MEM)
- 2,5-Dimethoxy-4-propoxyamphetamine (MPM)
