= Methoxyphenamine =

Pair of enantiomers

Clinical data
- AHFS/Drugs.com: International Drug Names
- Routes of administration: Oral
- ATC code: R03CB02 (WHO)

Legal status
- Legal status: In general: ℞ (Prescription only)

Pharmacokinetic data
- Metabolism: O-demethylation
- Metabolites: ODMP

Identifiers
- IUPAC name: 1-(2-methoxyphenyl)-N-methylpropan-2-amine
- CAS Number: 93-30-1
- PubChem CID: 4117
- ChemSpider: 3974
- UNII: J3Z5SRI26Z
- CompTox Dashboard (EPA): DTXSID0023292
- ECHA InfoCard: 100.002.035

Chemical and physical data
- Formula: C_{11}H_{17}NO
- Molar mass: 179.263 g·mol^{−1}
- 3D model (JSmol): Interactive image
- SMILES: CC(CC1=CC=CC=C1OC)NC
- InChI: InChI=1S/C11H17NO/c1-9(12-2)8-10-6-4-5-7-11(10)13-3/h4-7,9,12H,8H2,1-3H3; Key:OEHAYUOVELTAPG-UHFFFAOYSA-N

Methoxyphenamine (trade names ASMI, Euspirol, Orthoxine, Ortodrinex, Proasma), also known as 2-methoxy-N-methylamphetamine (OMMA), is a β-adrenergic receptor agonist of the amphetamine class used as a bronchodilator.

It acts as an anti-inflammatory in rats.

== Chemistry ==
Methoxyphenamine was first synthesized at the Upjohn company by Woodruff and co-workers. A later synthesis by Heinzelman, from the same company, corrects the melting point given for methoxyphenamine hydrochloride in the earlier paper, and describes an improved synthetic procedure, as well as resolution of the racemic methoxyphenamine.

== See also ==
- Substituted methoxyphenethylamine
- 2-Methoxyamphetamine (OMA)
- 3-Methoxy-N-methylamphetamine (MMMA)
- 4-Methoxy-N-methylamphetamine (PMMA)
- Methoxamine
