= Methedrone =

Chemical compound of the cathinone class

Clinical data
- Other names: para-Methoxymethcathinone; 4-Methoxymethcathinone; bk-PMMA; PMMC; Methoxyphedrine; 4-MeOMC
- Drug class: Serotonin-norepinephrine reuptake inhibitor; serotonin-norepinephrine-dopamine releasing agent
- ATC code: none

Legal status
- Legal status: DE: Anlage II (Authorized trade only, not prescriptible); UK: Class B; I-P(Poland)

Pharmacokinetic data
- Elimination half-life: 26.2 ± 0.7 hours

Identifiers
- IUPAC name: (RS)-1-(4-Methoxyphenyl)-2-(methylamino)propan-1-one
- CAS Number: 530-54-1
- PubChem CID: 216281
- ChemSpider: 187475
- UNII: L7HY239I58
- ChEMBL: ChEMBL2106893
- CompTox Dashboard (EPA): DTXSID20862127
- ECHA InfoCard: 100.209.920

Chemical and physical data
- Formula: C_{11}H_{15}NO_{2}
- Molar mass: 193.246 g·mol^{−1}
- 3D model (JSmol): Interactive image
- Chirality: Racemic mixture
- SMILES: O=C(c1ccc(OC)cc1)C(NC)C
- InChI: InChI=1S/C11H15NO2/c1-8(12-2)11(13)9-4-6-10(14-3)7-5-9/h4-8,12H,1-3H3; Key:MQUIHBQDYYAEMH-UHFFFAOYSA-N

Methedrone (para-methoxymethcathinone, 4-methoxymethcathinone, bk-PMMA, PMMC, methoxyphedrine, 4-MeOMC) is a recreational drug of the cathinone chemical class. Chemically, methedrone is closely related to para-methoxymethamphetamine (PMMA), methylone and mephedrone. Methedrone received media attention in 2009 after the death of two young Swedish men. In both cases toxicology analysis showed methedrone was the only drug present in both men during the time of their overdose and subsequent deaths.

== Uses ==
=== Dosage ===
There is little information available about how Methedrone is dosed. According to users, a single dose of Methedrone varies from 50 to 500 mg with effects lasting 45 minutes to two hours. There are at least two cases known of fatal intoxications with Methedrone. In the first case, the postmortem femoral blood sample of the patient contained a concentration of 8.4 μg/g Methedrone, the patient died 16 hours after consumption (with polysubstance use detected). In the second body the concentration in the femoral blood sample was 9.6 μg/g, with Methedrone being the only toxic compound detected. The scientific investigation of these cases suggests that the Methedrone alone was responsible for these deaths and that the concentrations in the femoral blood represent the fatal levels of methedrone. These studies show that the therapeutic index (or safety ratio) is low compared to other illegal drugs like Amphetamine. A fatal dose is likely to be around 8 μg/g whereas the dose among users varies from 0.1 to 4.8 μg/g blood according to studies.

== Adverse effects ==
Anecdotal and case reports of human use of "bath salts", such as methedrone, suggest that these substances produce powerful psychological effects. These psychological effects include psychotic behavior, paranoia, delusions, hallucinations and also self-injury.

There is very little known of the physical effects of methedrone in humans, but studies to the effects of methedrone in mice show that it produces a significant increase in circling, beam breaks and hyperactivity. Furthermore, the mice also showed a significant increase in salivation, head weaving and stimulation. Methedrone is currently a legal drug in many jurisdictions, however studies show that it shares major pharmacological properties with drugs that have been banned, such as mephedrone and methylone. Also, the effects of Methedrone are very similar to the effects of banned drugs in mice. This suggests that Methedrone may be just as harmful as most commonly found Illicit drugs.

The health risks associated with methedrone are mostly unknown, but are expected to be similar to other cathinones. Methedrone was almost immediately withdrawn from sale by initial vendors after reports of adverse health effects. Some amphetamine analogs containing a para-methoxy group are known to cause severe hyperthermia and even death due to concurrent MAOI and monoamine releasing action.

== Overdose ==
The deaths of two young men in southeast Sweden in 2009 were attributed to methedrone overdose.

Both were comatose when found. One suffered cardiorespiratory arrest on the way to the hospital, while the second survived for 16 hours in the emergency department.

=== Acute toxicity ===
There is little research regarding the toxicity of methedrone. Research has been done by animal-testing on mice once. Also, the lethal doses found in the two Swedish methedrone-victims have been compared to the methedrone concentrations in the blood of two other males dying in similar conditions.

The mean of the methedrone concentrations in the blood of the two deceased was 1.3 μg/g blood. One of these victims had a very high concentration of Methedrone in the blood, approximately 4.8 μg/g blood. The mean of the concentrations found in the blood of the deceased victims was 8.0 μg/g blood. None of the non-lethal doses or lethal doses is known, suggesting that the safety gap between a lethal and non-lethal dose of methedrone is probably very small, thus making use of this drug dangerous because poisonings, and simultaneously death, are accidental.

In a study of the effects of synthetic cathinones in ‘bath salts’ the effects of methedrone on mice were tested, these effects were compared to the effects of cocaine and methamphetamine. Different tests were performed to get insight into motor coordination, balance and overall behavioral effects. The mice did not show any difference in motor coordination or balance (doses administered were 10.0 mg/kg and 30.0 mg/kg). However significant changes were shown in overall behavioural effects. Administration of methedrone led to:

- Increase of repeated movement of the mouse in a circular manner
- Hyperactivity
- Excessive salivation
- Increase of head weaving
- Increase of stimulation, tense body

These effects are related with addiction potential. Excessive salivation is not an effect that is typically reported in humans. It is suggested that methedrone increases salivation via brain systems that primarily regulate autonomic responses.

Compared with mephedrone, methylenedioxypyrovalerone (MDPV) and 4-fluoromethcathinone (4-FMC), methedrone has a relatively slow onset. Thereby increasing the risk; because effects are not immediately shown, this could lead to an accidental overdose. It could also make the drug less popular, because humans tend to favor drugs that cause large, rapid initial increases in locomotor activity.

=== Chronic toxicity ===
Even in comparison with acute toxicity, chronic toxicity is poorly researched. Only the post-mortem study did little investigation on this subject. The findings of this study only showed that hair of the deceased victims contained methedrone, however, no conclusions were made regarding these findings.

No studies have examined the effect of methedrone use during or before pregnancy by a pregnant female on the embryo, nor is the carcinogenicity researched.

== Pharmacology ==
=== Mechanism of action ===
Methedrone has been found to be a potent serotonin transporter (SERT) and norepinephrine transporter (NET) inhibitor, but a weak dopamine transporter (DAT) inhibitor. Clinically, the DAT/SERT ratio of methedrone is less than one. Other analog compounds commonly have a DAT/SERT ratio less than half, meaning unlike other MDMA-like compounds methedrone does not prefer inhibition of the NET and DAT over the SERT. The resulting lack of inhibition despite its proclivity to release DAT can lead to a life-threatening adrenergic storm. Methedrone's high selectivity for SERT places it among the highest selectivity when compared to structurally similar compounds.

Methedrone induces the transportation mediated release of NE, DA and 5-HT from cells preloaded with monoamines making it a serotonin–norepinephrine–dopamine (SNDRA) releasing agent, also known as triple releasing agent (TRA), which is a common characteristic among drugs of abuse.

It has been found that methedrone is similar to MDMA in terms of the monoamine transporter interactions but an in vivo study of the drug resulted in a stronger hyperthermic reaction than what is normally reported in studies of MDMAs. Methedrone's affects on the serotonin transporter, SERT, can interfere and cause complications in individuals co-administering with serotonin altering medications such as selective serotonin reuptake inhibitors (SSRIs).

=== Pharmacokinetics ===
To consider how methedrone (4-MeOMC) acts in a biological system, it is necessary to study the stability in an aqueous solution. Because, when tested directly in blood or urine, it is not known whether the compound will be degraded by enzymes available in the biological solutions or cause the chemical mechanisms, such as pH or dissolved oxygen. The length of the half-life of the compound has been examined and the percent remaining after 12 hours in buffers with various pHs. The tested pHs were 4, 7, 10 and 12.

The conclusions are that methedrone, just as most analogs, is stable in acid solutions. However, in neutral and basic solutions it is decomposed, where a stronger decomposing takes place as the solution turns more basic.

When comparing methedrone with its analogs, it has been found that there are several factors which affect their stability:

- The substituted group on the benzene ring.
- The groups attached at the nitrogen atom, but this is not applicable for methedrone.

Methedrone and four other analogs have their groups substituted in the meta- or para-positions. For these compounds the rate constant, k, has been determined and a Hammett plot was constructed by plotting the decomposition rate constant (0.693/half-life) in the pH of 12 against their Hammett constants, taken from literature. This again shows that methedrone is a relatively stable compound even in basic solution.

Another conclusion based on the results from the literature is that there is negative charge built up in the transition state during the rate determining step. This reasoning is based on the good linear correlation (r=0.9805) and the positive slope (determined as 1.76).

There are two possible metabolites known for methedrone:

- The carbon between the nitrogen group and R1, an H-atom in case of methedrone, will be replaced. This will lead to a smaller compound.
- The methyl group bound to the oxygen at the benzene group will be replaced by an H-atom. This metabolite will lose the epoxide and turn into a hydroxy-compound.

== Chemistry ==
=== Structure ===
Methedrone is a synthetic cathinone. It is related to the parent compound cathinone. Methedrone belongs to the phenethylamine family due to the presence of the cyclic group of atoms C_{6}H_{5} in which six carbons bind to form a hexagonal ring with five hydrogens each bonding to a carbon and the remaining carbon bonded to an atom or group of atoms other than hydrogen.

=== Synthesis ===
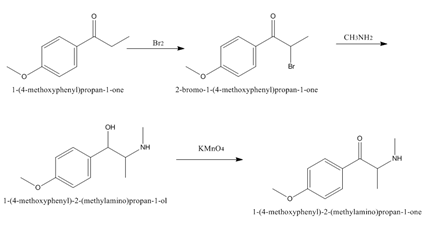
Figure 1: Synthesis of methedrone

The synthesis of methedrone is described in figure 1. and can be written as the following steps:

1. Bromination of 1-(4-methoxyphenyl)propan-1-one to 2-bromo-1-(4-methoxyphenyl)propan-1-one.
2. A reaction with methylamine in which the 2-bromo-1-(4-methoxyphenyl)propan-1-one becomes 1-(4-methoxyphenyl)-2-(methylamino)propan-1-ol.
3. The final step is a reaction with potassium permanganate.

The synthesis of mephedrone, a structurally similar compound with only one less ether group than methedrone, is well documented.

=== Reactivity ===
There are no articles found about the reactivity of methedrone.

== History ==
The synthesis of methedrone was first reported in 1933.

== Society and culture ==
=== Names ===
Methoxyphedrine is the generic name of the drug and its INN.

=== Recreational use ===
Methedrone is a research chemical and its euphoric and stimulant properties can be abused. Similarly to MDMA it can be administered through insufflation, ingestion, smoking, rectal, and intravenous routes; however, it differs greatly in both duration and toxicity and great care should be taken when used due to the lack of medical literature available common among designer drugs.

=== Legal status ===
Its sale has been banned in Sweden since December 9, 2009.

It is a controlled substance in China since October 1, 2015.

Methedrone can be purchased legally in Europe (excluding Sweden) and in most states in the US on the Internet, but also it can also be found at head shops and other retailers. It is, along with other new or unregulated synthetic drugs and research chemicals, commonly labeled as a "bath salt".

== Other animals ==
=== Mice ===
Methedrone has been found to have an effect on the overall behavior of mice which includes:

- Excessive salivation
- Hyperactivity
- Increase of head weaving
- Increase of repeated movement of the mouse in a circular manner
- Increase of stimulation, tense body
