= N-Methylpseudoephedrine =

Names
- Preferred IUPAC name (1S,2S)-2-(Dimethylamino)-1-phenylpropan-1-ol

Identifiers
CAS Number	51018-28-1
3D model (JSmol)	Interactive image
ChemSpider	5415764
ECHA InfoCard	100.154.419
PubChem CID	7059596
UNII	6P8GZM6LZU
CompTox Dashboard (EPA)	DTXSID401021166
- InChI: InChI=1S/C11H17NO/c1-9(12(2)3)11(13)10-7-5-4-6-8-10/h4-9,11,13H,1-3H3/t9-,11+/m0/s1 Key: FMCGSUUBYTWNDP-GXSJLCMTSA-N; InChI=1/C11H17NO/c1-9(12(2)3)11(13)10-7-5-4-6-8-10/h4-9,11,13H,1-3H3/t9-,11+/m0/s1 Key: FMCGSUUBYTWNDP-GXSJLCMTBS
- SMILES: O[C@@H](c1ccccc1)[C@@H](N(C)C)C

Properties
Chemical formula	C_{11}H_{17}NO
Molar mass	179.263 g·mol^{−1}
Melting point	29 to 31 °C (84 to 88 °F; 302 to 304 K)
- Except where otherwise noted, data are given for materials in their standard state (at 25 °C [77 °F], 100 kPa). Infobox references

N-Methylpseudoephedrine is a stimulant. It is a derivative of pseudoephedrine and an isomer of N-methylephedrine. It is present in ephedra.

In organic chemistry, it is used in asymmetric synthesis.
