= Etafedrine =

Chemical compound

Clinical data
- Trade names: Menetyl; Nethaprin; Novedrin
- Other names: Ethylephedrine; N-Ethylephedrine
- ATC code: None

Legal status
- Legal status: AU: S2 (Pharmacy medicine); BR: Class D1 (Drug precursors); Withdrawn from market

Identifiers
- IUPAC name: (1R,2S)-2-[Ethyl(methyl)amino]-1-phenyl-1-propanol
- CAS Number: 48141-64-6
- PubChem CID: 10734
- DrugBank: DB11587
- ChemSpider: 85308
- UNII: 2Y6VQU63E8
- ChEBI: CHEBI:134847
- ChEMBL: ChEMBL2110926
- CompTox Dashboard (EPA): DTXSID201016521
- ECHA InfoCard: 100.051.218

Chemical and physical data
- Formula: C_{12}H_{19}NO
- Molar mass: 193.290 g·mol^{−1}
- 3D model (JSmol): Interactive image
- SMILES: O[C@H](c1ccccc1)[C@@H](N(CC)C)C
- InChI: InChI=1S/C12H19NO/c1-4-13(3)10(2)12(14)11-8-6-5-7-9-11/h5-10,12,14H,4H2,1-3H3/t10-,12-/m0/s1; Key:IRVLBORJKFZWMI-JQWIXIFHSA-N

Etafedrine (INN, BAN), sold under the brand name Nethaprin among others and also known as N-ethylephedrine, is a sympathomimetic agent used as a bronchodilator to treat asthma. It was previously commercially available as both the free base and as the hydrochloride salt from Sanofi-Aventis (now Sanofi) but is now no longer marketed.

== Pharmacology ==
Unlike ephedrine and tyramine, etafedrine does not induce the release of epinephrine or norepinephrine and instead acts as a selective β_{2}-adrenergic receptor agonist, thereby mediating its bronchodilator effects.

== See also ==
- Cinnamedrine
- Methylephedrine
