= Pholedrine =

Chemical compound

Clinical data
- Trade names: Paredrinol, Presoitan, Pulsotyl, Veritain, Veritol
- Other names: 4-Hydroxy-N-methylamphetamine; 4-HMA; 4-Hydroxymethamphetamine; para-Hydroxymethamphetamine; PHMA; Hydroxymethamphetamine
- Routes of administration: Topical (ocular)

Identifiers
- IUPAC name: 4-[2-(Methylamino)propyl]phenol
- CAS Number: 370-14-9
- PubChem CID: 4655
- DrugBank: DBMET00735
- ChemSpider: 4494
- UNII: AY28O44JGD
- KEGG: D08370
- ChEBI: CHEBI:134798
- ChEMBL: ChEMBL2008672
- CompTox Dashboard (EPA): DTXSID70861908
- ECHA InfoCard: 100.006.114

Chemical and physical data
- Formula: C_{10}H_{15}NO
- Molar mass: 165.236 g·mol^{−1}
- 3D model (JSmol): Interactive image
- SMILES: Oc1ccc(cc1)CC(NC)C
- InChI: InChI=1S/C10H15NO/c1-8(11-2)7-9-3-5-10(12)6-4-9/h3-6,8,11-12H,7H2,1-2H3; Key:SBUQZKJEOOQSBV-UHFFFAOYSA-N

Pholedrine, also known as 4-hydroxy-N-methylamphetamine and sold under the brand names Paredrinol, Pulsotyl, and Veritol among others, is a sympathomimetic drug used in topical eye drops to dilate the pupil. It can be used to diagnose Horner's syndrome.

In 2004, it remained marketed only in Germany.

== Pharmacology ==
=== Pharmacodynamics ===
Pholedrine is described as a sympathomimetic, antihypotensive, and ephedrine-like agent.

== Chemistry ==
Pholedrine, also known as 4-hydroxy-N-methylamphetamine, is a substituted phenethylamine and amphetamine derivative. It is structurally related to methamphetamine (N-methylamphetamine), norpholedrine (4-hydroxyamphetamine), oxilofrine (4,β-dihydroxy-N-methylamphetamine), and tyramine (4-hydroxyphenethylamine).

It is used pharmaceutically as the sulfate salt.

The predicted log P of pholedrine ranges from 1.12 to 1.7.

== History ==
Pholedrine was synthesized by 1951.

== Society and culture ==
=== Names ===
Pholedrine is the generic name of the drug and its INN, BAN, and DCF, while foledrina is its DCIT. The drug has been sold under brand names including Pholedrin Liquidum, Pholedrin-Longo-Isis, Presoitan, Veritain, and Veritol among others.

== Other drugs ==
Pholedrine (4-hydroxymethamphetamine) is also a major metabolite of methamphetamine.
