= 4-Methylmethamphetamine =

Stimulant and entactogen drug of the amphetamine class

Clinical data
- Other names: 4-Methyl-N-methylamphetamine; 4-Me-MA; 4-MMA; para-Methyl-N-methylamphetamine; PMeMA; Mephedrine
- Routes of administration: Oral, intramuscular injection
- Drug class: Stimulant; Serotonin–norepinephrine–dopamine releasing agent
- ATC code: None

Legal status
- Legal status: CA: Schedule I; UK: Class A; US: Schedule I (isomer of Etilamfetamime)

Identifiers
- IUPAC name: N-methyl-1-(4-methylphenyl)propan-2-amine
- CAS Number: 714965-56-7; hydrochloride: 161697-16-1
- PubChem CID: 13803306
- ChemSpider: 23900071
- UNII: 3R4PNL8UA7; hydrochloride: RN237JWQ2X
- CompTox Dashboard (EPA): DTXSID201024502

Chemical and physical data
- Formula: C_{11}H_{17}N
- Molar mass: 163.264 g·mol^{−1}
- 3D model (JSmol): Interactive image
- SMILES: c1cc(C)ccc1CC(C)NC
- InChI: InChI=1S/C11H17N/c1-9-4-6-11(7-5-9)8-10(2)12-3/h4-7,10,12H,8H2,1-3H3; Key:GAIWFPOJOHUEBL-UHFFFAOYSA-N

4-Methylmethamphetamine (4-MMA), also known as mephedrine, is a putative stimulant and entactogen drug of the amphetamine family. It acts as a serotonin–norepinephrine–dopamine releasing agent (SNDRA). The drug is the β-diketone analogue of mephedrone (4-methylmethcathinone; 4-MMC) and the N-methyl analogue of 4-methylamphetamine (4-MA).

== Pharmacology ==
=== Pharmacodynamics ===
4-MMA acts as a potent and well-balanced serotonin–norepinephrine–dopamine releasing agent (SNDRA). It induces hyperlocomotion and stereotypy (psychostimulant-like effects) as well as hyperthermia in mice, similarly to methcathinone.

Monoamine release of 4-methylmethamphetamine and related agents (EC_{50}, nM)
Compound	NE	DA	5-HT	Ref
Dextroamphetamine	6.6–10.2	5.8–24.8	698–1,765	
Dextromethamphetamine	12.3–14.3	8.5–40.4	736–1,292	
4-Methylamphetamine	22.2	44.1	53.4	
4-Methylmethamphetamine (mephedrine)	66.9	41.3	67.4	
4-Methylethylamphetamine	182	550	102	
4-Methylpropylamphetamine	752	IA	650	
4-Methylbutylamphetamine	IA	IA	IA	
4-Methylmethcathinone (mephedrone)	58–62.7	49.1–51	118.3–122	
Notes: The smaller the value, the more strongly the drug releases the neurotransmitter. The assays were done in rat brain synaptosomes and human potencies may be different. See also Monoamine releasing agent § Activity profiles for a larger table with more compounds. Refs:

==== Dopaminergic neurotoxicity ====
In contrast to methamphetamine and methcathinone, 4-MMA appears to produce minimal dopaminergic neurotoxicity in mice. Conversely, mephedrone shows no dopaminergic neurotoxicity at all in mice. It was theorized that 4-methyl and β-keto substitutions on amphetamines may result in loss of activity at the vesicular monoamine transporter 2 (VMAT2), loss of elevations of cytosolic dopamine concentrations, and consequent loss of dopaminergic neurotoxic potential. Accordingly, the dopaminergic neurotoxicity of 4-MMA was greatly enhanced by the dopamine precursor levodopa (L-DOPA), the monoamine oxidase inhibitor (MAOI) pargyline, and methamphetamine (a VMAT2 inhibitor/reverser), all of which are known to increase the cytosolic pool of dopamine. However, in contrast to 4-MMA, the dopaminergic neurotoxicity of methcathinone was enhanced only by levodopa and that of mephedrone was enhanced only by methamphetamine.

== See also ==
- Substituted amphetamine
- 2-Methylmethamphetamine (2-MMA)
- 3-Methylmethamphetamine (3-MMA)
- 3-Methoxymethamphetamine (MMMA)
- 4-Methoxymethamphetamine (PMMA)
- 4-Fluoromethamphetamine (4-FMA)
