= Para-Methoxy-N-ethylamphetamine =

Chemical compound

PMEA

Legal status
- Legal status: DE: Anlage II (Authorized trade only, not prescriptible); UK: Class A

Identifiers
- IUPAC name: N-ethyl-1-(4-methoxyphenyl)propan-2-amine
- CAS Number: 14367-46-5 93963-24-7 (hydrochloride)
- PubChem CID: 85725
- ChemSpider: 77316
- UNII: CA3JZQ6AZC
- CompTox Dashboard (EPA): DTXSID00931981
- ECHA InfoCard: 100.034.839

Chemical and physical data
- Formula: C_{12}H_{19}NO
- Molar mass: 193.290 g·mol^{−1}
- 3D model (JSmol): Interactive image
- SMILES: O(c1ccc(cc1)CC(NCC)C)C
- InChI: InChI=1S/C12H19NO/c1-4-13-10(2)9-11-5-7-12(14-3)8-6-11/h5-8,10,13H,4,9H2,1-3H3; Key:USBWBBAUWVUJLA-UHFFFAOYSA-N

para-Methoxyethylamphetamine (PMEA) is a stimulant drug related to PMA. PMEA reputedly produces similar effects to PMA, but is considerably less potent and seems to have slightly less tendency to produce severe hyperthermia, at least at low doses. At higher doses however the side effects and danger of death approach those of PMA itself, and PMEA should still be considered a potentially dangerous drug. Investigation of a drug-related death in Japan in 2005 showed PMEA to be present in the body and was thought to be responsible for the death.

It is formed as a minor metabolite by mebeverine, which can result in false positives on drug tests for "ecstasy".

== See also ==
- Substituted methoxyphenethylamine
- 3-Fluoroethamphetamine
- 3,4-Methylenedioxyethamphetamine
- Fenfluramine
