= Substituted β-hydroxyamphetamine =

Class of compounds based upon the β-hydroxyamphetamine structure

Substituted β-hydroxyamphetamines
- Drug class
- Racemic β-hydroxyamphetamine skeleton

Class identifiers
- Synonyms: β-Hydroxyamphetamines; β-Hydroxyphenylisopropylamines; β-Hydroxyphenylaminopropanes; Phenylisopropanolamines; Phenylpropanolamines; Norephedrines; Amphetanolamines; Cathinols; Cathines
- Chemical class: Substituted derivatives of β-hydroxyamphetamine

Legal status

Substituted β-hydroxyamphetamines, or simply β-hydroxyamphetamines, also known as phenylisopropanolamines, phenylpropanolamines, norephedrines, or cathinols, are derivatives of β-hydroxyamphetamine with one or more chemical substituents. They are substituted phenethylamines, phenylethanolamines (β-hydroxyphenethylamines), and amphetamines (α-methylphenethylamines), and are closely related to but distinct from the substituted cathinones (β-ketoamphetamines). Examples of β-hydroxyamphetamines include the β-hydroxyamphetamine stereoisomers phenylpropanolamine and cathine and the stereospecific N-methylated β-hydroxyamphetamine derivatives ephedrine and pseudoephedrine, among many others.

In terms of pharmacological activity, the β-hydroxyamphetamines include indirectly acting norepinephrine and dopamine releasing agents and directly acting α- and β-adrenergic receptor agonists, among other actions. In contrast to their amphetamine counterparts, ephedrine and 4-fluoroephedrine are not agonists of the human trace amine-associated receptor 1 (TAAR1). With regard to medical and other uses, β-hydroxyamphetamines are employed as sympathomimetics, decongestants, bronchodilators, vasoconstrictors, vasodilators, tocolytics, antitussives, cardiac stimulants, antihypotensive agents, appetite suppressants, psychostimulants, wakefulness-promoting agents, antidepressants, euphoriants or recreational drugs, and performance-enhancing drugs (in exercise and sports), among others.

β-Hydroxyamphetamines have increased hydrophilicity and lower lipophilicity relative to their amphetamine counterparts owing to their β-hydroxyl group. For comparison, the predicted log P (XLogP3) of amphetamine is 1.8, of β-hydroxyamphetamine is 0.8, and of cathinone is 1.1. As a result of their reduced lipophilicity, they are generally less able to cross the blood–brain barrier and show greater peripheral selectivity in comparison to the corresponding amphetamine analogues. This makes the β-hydroxyamphetamines less applicable for use as centrally-acting agents but more applicable for peripherally-specific uses such as sympathomimetic stimulation. Besides different physicochemical properties, there is also a large drop in the potency of β-hydroxyamphetamines as monoamine releasing agents in vitro relative to amphetamines and cathinones.

== List of substituted β-hydroxyamphetamines ==
| Generic or Trivial Name | Chemical Name | # of Subs |
|---|---|---|
| β-Hydroxyamphetamine (phenylisopropanolamine) | β-Hydroxy-α-methylphenethylamine | 0 |
| Phenylpropanolamine (PPA; norephedrine) | β-Hydroxyamphetamine, (1RS,2SR)- | 0 |
| (1R,2S)-Phenylpropanolamine | β-Hydroxyamphetamine, (1R,2S)- | 0 |
| (1S,2R)-Phenylpropanolamine | β-Hydroxyamphetamine, (1S,2R)- | 0 |
| Norpseudoephedrine | β-Hydroxyamphetamine, (1SR,2RS)- | 0 |
| Cathine (D-norpseudoephedrine) | β-Hydroxyamphetamine, (1S,2S)- | 0 |
| L-Norpseudoephedrine | β-Hydroxyamphetamine, (1R,2R)- | 0 |
| β-Hydroxy-N-methylamphetamine | β-Hydroxy-N-methylamphetamine | 1 |
| Racephedrine (racemic ephedrine) | β-Hydroxy-N-methylamphetamine, (1RS,2SR)- | 1 |
| Ephedrine | β-Hydroxy-N-methylamphetamine, (1R,2S)- | 1 |
| (1S,2R)-Ephedrine | β-Hydroxy-N-methylamphetamine, (1S,2R)- | 1 |
| Racemic pseudoephedrine | β-Hydroxy-N-methylamphetamine, (1RS,2RS)- | 1 |
| Pseudoephedrine | β-Hydroxy-N-methylamphetamine, (1S,2S)- | 1 |
| (1R,2R)-Pseudoephedrine | β-Hydroxy-N-methylamphetamine, (1R,2R)- | 1 |
| meta-Hydroxynorephedrine | 3,β-Dihydroxyamphetamine | 1 |
| Metaraminol (metaradrine) | 3,β-Dihydroxyamphetamine, (1R,2S)- | 1 |
| para-Hydroxynorephedrine | 4,β-Dihydroxyamphetamine | 1 |
| Oxyfedrine | β-Hydroxy-N-(...)-amphetamine, (1R,2S)- | 1 |
| Alifedrine | β-Hydroxy-N-(...)-amphetamine, (1R,2S)- | 1 |
| Tinofedrine | β-Hydroxy-N-(3,3-di-3-thienyl)-2-propenyl)amphetamine, (1R,2S)- | 1 |
| Cafedrine (ethyltheophyllinylnorephedrine) | β-Hydroxy-N-(ethyltheophyllinyl)amphetamine | 1 |
| Methylephedrine (N-methylephedrine) | β-Hydroxy-N,N-dimethylamphetamine, (1R,2S)- | 2 |
| N-Methylpseudoephedrine | β-Hydroxy-N,N-dimethylamphetamine, (1S,2S)- | 2 |
| Cinnamedrine (cinnamylephedrine) | β-Hydroxy-N-methyl-N-cinnamylamphetamine | 2 |
| Etafedrine (ethylephedrine) | β-Hydroxy-N-methyl-N-ethylamphetamine, (1R,2S)- | 2 |
| 4-Fluoroephedrine | 4-Fluoro-β-hydroxy-N-methylamphetamine | 2 |
| Oxilofrine (4-hydroxyephedrine) | 4,β-Dihydroxy-N-methylamphetamine | 2 |
| 4-Methylephedrine (dihydromephedrone) | 4-Methyl-β-hydroxy-N-methylamphetamine | 2 |
| Corbadrine (levonordefrin; α-methylnorepinephrine) | 3,4,β-Trihydroxyamphetamine | 2 |
| Methoxamine (methoxamedrine) | 2,6-Dimethoxy-β-hydroxyamphetamine | 2 |
| Hexapradol | α-Desmethyl-α-hexyl-β-hydroxy-β-phenylamphetamine | 2 |
| Erythrohydrobupropion | 3-Chloro-β-hydroxy-N-tert-butylamphetamine, erythro- | 2 |
| Threohydrobupropion | 3-Chloro-β-hydroxy-N-tert-butylamphetamine, threo- | 2 |
| Ritodrine | 4,β-Dihydroxy-N-(4-hydroxyphenylethyl)amphetamine | 2 |
| Isoxsuprine | 4,β-Dihydroxy-N-(...)-amphetamine | 2 |
| Suloctidil | 4-Isopropylthio-β-hydroxy-N-octylamphetamine | 2 |
| Buphenine | 4,β-Dihydroxy-N-(...)-amphetamine | 2 |
| Trecadrine | β-Hydroxy-N-methyl-N-(...)-amphetamine | 2 |
| Ethylnorepinephrine (butanefrine) | β,3,4-Trihydroxy-α-desmethyl-α-ethylamphetamine | 3 |
| Dioxifedrine (α-methylepinephrine; 3,4-dihydroxyephedrine) | 3,4,β-Trihydroxy-N-methylamphetamine | 3 |
| Dioxethedrin (α-methyl-N-ethylnorepinephrine) | 3,4,β-Trihydroxy-N-ethylamphetamine | 3 |
| Butaxamine | 2,5-Dimethoxy-β-hydroxy-N-tert-butylamphetamine, (1S,2S)- | 3 |
| Isoetarine | 3,4,β-Trihydroxy-α-desmethyl-α-ethyl-N-isopropylamphetamine | 4 |
| Procaterol | 2,3-(...)-4,β-dihydroxy-N-isopropyl-α-desmethyl-α-ethyl- amphetamine, (1R,2S)- | 5 |

=== Side-chain-cyclized substituted β-hydroxyamphetamines ===
Some β-hydroxyamphetamines have had their side chain extended and cyclized. Examples include certain substituted phenylmorpholines like phenmetrazine and phendimetrazine and their analogues; substituted phenylmorpholines related to bupropion like radafaxine (cyclized (2S,3S)-hydroxybupropion) and manifaxine; certain substituted aminorexes like 4-methylaminorex and 4,4'-dimethylaminorex; and other compounds including cilobamine, diphenylprolinol, ifenprodil, levophacetoperane, pipradrol, rimiterol, traxoprodil, vibegron, and zilpaterol.

== Activity profiles ==
Monoamine release by β-hydroxyamphetamines and related agents (EC_{50}, nM)
| Compound | NE | DA | 5-HT | Class | Ref |
|---|---|---|---|---|---|
| Amphetamine | ND | ND | ND | Amphetamine | ND |
| Dextroamphetamine (S(+)-amphetamine) | 6.6–7.2 | 5.8–24.8 | 698–1765 | Amphetamine | |
| Levoamphetamine (R(–)-amphetamine) | ND | ND | ND | Amphetamine | ND |
| Methamphetamine | ND | ND | ND | Amphetamine | ND |
| Dextromethamphetamine (S(+)-methamphetamine) | 12.3–13.8 | 8.5–24.5 | 736–1291.7 | Amphetamine | |
| Levomethamphetamine (R(–)-methamphetamine) | 28.5 | 416 | 4640 | Amphetamine | |
| Cathinone | ND | ND | ND | Cathinone | ND |
| S(–)-Cathinone (L-cathinone) | 12.4 | 18.5 | 2366 | Cathinone | |
| Methcathinone | ND | ND | ND | Cathinone | ND |
| L-Methcathinone | 13.1 | 14.8 | 1772 | Cathinone | |
| Phenylpropanolamine (norephedrine) | ND | ND | ND | β-Hydroxyamphetamine | ND |
| (+)-Phenylpropanolamine ((+)-norephedrine) | 42.1 | 302 | >10000 | β-Hydroxyamphetamine | |
| (–)-Phenylpropanolamine ((–)-norephedrine) | 137 | 1371 | >10000 | β-Hydroxyamphetamine | |
| Norpseudoephedrine | ND | ND | ND | β-Hydroxyamphetamine | ND |
| Cathine ((+)-norpseudoephedrine) | 15.0 | 68.3 | >10000 | β-Hydroxyamphetamine | |
| (–)-Norpseudoephedrine | 30.1 | 294 | >10000 | β-Hydroxyamphetamine | |
| Racephedrine (racemic ephedrine) | ND | ND | ND | β-Hydroxyamphetamine | ND |
| Ephedrine ((–)-ephedrine) | 43.1–72.4 | 236–1350 | >10000 | β-Hydroxyamphetamine | |
| (+)-Ephedrine | 218 | 2104 | >10000 | β-Hydroxyamphetamine | |
| Racemic pseudoephedrine | ND | ND | ND | β-Hydroxyamphetamine | ND |
| (–)-Pseudoephedrine | 4092 | 9125 | >10000 | β-Hydroxyamphetamine | |
| Pseudoephedrine ((+)-pseudoephedrine) | 224 | 1988 | >10000 | β-Hydroxyamphetamine | |
The smaller the value, the more strongly the substance releases the neurotransmitter. See also Monoamine releasing agent § Activity profiles for a larger table with more compounds.

== See also ==
- Substituted amphetamine
- Substituted methylenedioxyphenethylamine
- Substituted cathinone
- Substituted phenylmorpholine
- 2Cs, DOx, 25-NB
- Substituted benzofurans
- List of aminorex analogues
- List of methylphenidate analogues
- Substituted tryptamine
- Substituted α-alkyltryptamines
- PiHKAL
