= Methoxamine =

Chemical compound

Clinical data
- Trade names: Vasoxine, Vasoxyl, Vasylox, others
- Other names: Methoxamedrine; 2,5-Dimethoxy-β-hydroxy-α-methylphenethylamine; 2,5-Dimethoxy-β-hydroxyamphetamine; β-Hydroxy-2,5-DMA; β-Hydroxy-DMA; β-Hydroxy-DOH
- AHFS/Drugs.com: International Drug Names
- Routes of administration: Oral, injection
- ATC code: C01CA10 (WHO)

Pharmacokinetic data
- Elimination half-life: 3 hours
- Excretion: Urine

Identifiers
- IUPAC name: 2-amino-1-(2,5-dimethoxyphenyl)propan-1-ol
- CAS Number: 390-28-3
- PubChem CID: 6082
- IUPHAR/BPS: 483
- DrugBank: DB00723
- ChemSpider: 5857
- UNII: HUQ1KC1YLI
- KEGG: D08201
- ChEMBL: ChEMBL524
- CompTox Dashboard (EPA): DTXSID0023290
- ECHA InfoCard: 100.006.244

Chemical and physical data
- Formula: C_{11}H_{17}NO_{3}
- Molar mass: 211.261 g·mol^{−1}
- 3D model (JSmol): Interactive image
- SMILES: O(c1ccc(OC)cc1C(O)C(N)C)C
- InChI: InChI=1S/C11H17NO3/c1-7(12)11(13)9-6-8(14-2)4-5-10(9)15-3/h4-7,11,13H,12H2,1-3H3; Key:WJAJPNHVVFWKKL-UHFFFAOYSA-N

Methoxamine, sold under the brand names Vasoxine, Vasoxyl, and Vasylox among others, is a sympathomimetic medication used as an antihypotensive agent. It has mostly or entirely been discontinued. The drug is an α_{1}-adrenergic receptor agonist.

== Medical uses ==
The long duration of action of methoxamine has been said to have rendered it obsolete in modern clinical practice.

== Pharmacology ==
Methoxamine is an α_{1}-adrenergic receptor agonist. It is described as a long-acting α_{1}-adrenergic receptor agonist and this is contrasted with phenylephrine which is said to be short-acting. Phenylephrine is 5 to 10 times more potent than methoxamine and has a 3-fold higher maximal effect.

== Chemistry ==
Methoxamine, also known as 2,5-dimethoxy-β-hydroxy-α-methylphenethylamine or as 2,5-dimethoxy-β-hydroxyamphetamine, is a substituted phenethylamine and amphetamine derivative.

=== Analogues ===
Analogues of methoxamine include desglymidodrine (2,5-dimethoxy-β-hydroxyphenethylamine), dimetofrine (3,5-dimethoxy-4,β-dihydroxy-N-methylphenethylamine), 2,5-dimethoxyamphetamine (2,5-DMA), butaxamine ((1S,2S)-2,5-dimethoxy-β-hydroxy-N-tert-butylamphetamine), methoxyphenamine (2-methoxy-N-methylamphetamine), and β-hydroxyamphetamine (e.g., phenylpropanolamine, norpseudoephedrine), among others.

== History ==
Methoxamine was synthesized by 1944. It was marketed in the United States by 1949.

== Society and culture ==
=== Names ===
Methoxamine is the generic name of the drug and its INN and BAN, while méthoxamine is its DCF and methoxamina is its DCIT. In the case of the hydrochloride salt, its generic name is methoxamine hydrochloride and this is its USAN, BANM, and JAN. A synonym of methoxamine is methoxamedrine. The drug has been sold under brand names including Idasal, Mexan, Pressomin, Vasosterol, Vasoxine, Vasoxyl, and Vasylox.

=== Availability ===
Methoxamine has been marketed in Canada, the Czech Republic, Ireland, Japan, Spain, the United Kingdom, and the United States and was available in these countries in 2000. However, it was discontinued in Canada and the United Kingdom by 2004. It has also been discontinued in the United States. By 2016, methoxamine appeared to remain available only in Japan.

== See also ==
- Substituted β-hydroxyamphetamine
- DOx § Related compounds
