= Racephedrine =

Pharmaceutical drug

- (−)-(1R,2S)-ephedrine (top), (+)-(1S,2R)-ephedrine (bottom)

Clinical data
- Trade names: Efetonina; Ephoxamine
- Other names: Racemic ephedrine; (±)-Ephedrine; dl-Ephedrine; (1RS,2SR)-Ephedrine
- Drug class: Norepinephrine releasing agent; Sympathomimetic; Bronchodilator; Psychostimulant

Identifiers
- IUPAC name: 2-(methylamino)-1-phenylpropan-1-ol
- CAS Number: 90-81-3
- PubChem CID: 5032
- DrugBank: DB14752
- ChemSpider: 4856
- UNII: 03VRY66076
- KEGG: C22822
- ChEMBL: ChEMBL279157

Chemical and physical data
- Formula: C_{10}H_{15}NO
- Molar mass: 165.236 g·mol^{−1}
- 3D model (JSmol): Interactive image
- SMILES: CC(C(C1=CC=CC=C1)O)NC
- InChI: InChI=1S/C10H15NO/c1-8(11-2)10(12)9-6-4-3-5-7-9/h3-8,10-12H,1-2H3; Key:KWGRBVOPPLSCSI-UHFFFAOYSA-N

Racephedrine, also known as racemic ephedrine and sold under the brand names Efetonina and Ephoxamine among others, is the racemic form of ephedrine which has been used as a bronchodilator to treat asthma. More specifically, it is a racemic mixture of (1R,2S)- and (1S,2R)-enantiomers. Conversely, ephedrine is the enantiopure (1R,2S)-enantiomer. Racephedrine has been marketed for medical use in Italy. Like ephedrine, racephedrine is a releasing agent of norepinephrine and to a much lesser extent of dopamine. Both ephedrine enantiomers are active in this regard, but ephedrine ((1R,2S)-ephedrine) has greater potency than (1S,2R)-ephedrine.

Monoamine release by ephedrine and related agents (EC_{50}, nM)
Compound	NE	DA	5-HT	Ref
Dextroamphetamine (S(+)-amphetamine)	6.6–7.2	5.8–24.8	698–1765	
S(–)-Cathinone	12.4	18.5	2366	
Ephedrine ((–)-ephedrine; (1R,2S)-ephedrine)	43.1–72.4	236–1350	>10000	
(+)-Ephedrine ((1S,2R)-ephedrine)	218	2104	>10000	
Dextromethamphetamine (S(+)-methamphetamine)	12.3–13.8	8.5–24.5	736–1291.7	
Levomethamphetamine (R(–)-methamphetamine)	28.5	416	4640	
(+)-Phenylpropanolamine ((+)-norephedrine)	42.1	302	>10000	
(–)-Phenylpropanolamine ((–)-norephedrine)	137	1371	>10000	
Cathine ((+)-norpseudoephedrine)	15.0	68.3	>10000	
(–)-Norpseudoephedrine	30.1	294	>10000	
(–)-Pseudoephedrine	4092	9125	>10000	
Pseudoephedrine ((+)-pseudoephedrine)	224	1988	>10000	
The smaller the value, the more strongly the substance releases the neurotransmitter. See also Monoamine releasing agent § Activity profiles for a larger table with more compounds.

Racephedrine has been used in a variety of combination drugs with other agents, including theophylline, aminophylline, oxtriphylline, phenobarbital, pentobarbital, pyrilamine, phenacetin, salicylamide, ascorbic acid, and opium, among others. Brand names of these combination preparations have included Amiphedrin, Amodrine, Amodrine E C, Asphamal-D, Asthmadrin, Cenamal, Cholarace, Phedrahist, Respirol, Salidin, Synate-M, and Synophedal.

== See also ==
- Hydroxymethylamphetamine
