= Trecadrine =

Anti-ulcer drug

Clinical data
- Routes of administration: Oral
- Drug class: Sympathomimetic; β_{3}-Adrenergic receptor agonist

Identifiers
- IUPAC name: 2-[methyl-[2-(2-tricyclo[9.4.0.0^{3,8}]pentadeca-1(15),3,5,7,11,13-hexaenylidene)ethyl]amino]-1-phenylpropan-1-ol
- CAS Number: 90845-56-0
- PubChem CID: 65823
- ChemSpider: 59235
- UNII: 34H206R8A5
- CompTox Dashboard (EPA): DTXSID50869068

Chemical and physical data
- Formula: C_{27}H_{29}NO
- Molar mass: 383.535 g·mol^{−1}
- 3D model (JSmol): Interactive image
- SMILES: CC(C(C1=CC=CC=C1)O)N(C)CC=C2C3=CC=CC=C3CCC4=CC=CC=C42
- InChI: InChI=1S/C27H29NO/c1-20(27(29)23-12-4-3-5-13-23)28(2)19-18-26-24-14-8-6-10-21(24)16-17-22-11-7-9-15-25(22)26/h3-15,18,20,27,29H,16-17,19H2,1-2H3; Key:BHVGOYREXHCFOE-UHFFFAOYSA-N

Trecadrine (INN) is a drug that was originally developed as an anti-ulcer agent but was found to act as a β_{3}-adrenergic receptor agonist with potential anti-obesity and anti-diabetic properties. It is selective for the β_{3}-adrenergic receptor, lacking activity at the β_{1}- and β_{2}-adrenergic receptors. The drug is orally active. Structurally, trecadrine is a substituted β-hydroxyamphetamine and derivative of β-hydroxy-N-methylamphetamine (ephedrine, pseudoephedrine) with a tricyclic moiety attached at the amine.
