= Adrenergic agonist =

Drug that stimulates a response from the adrenergic receptors

An adrenergic agonist is a drug that stimulates a response from the adrenergic receptors. The five main categories of adrenergic receptors are: α_{1}, α_{2}, β_{1}, β_{2}, and β_{3}, although there are more subtypes, and agonists vary in specificity between these receptors, and may be classified respectively. However, there are also other mechanisms of adrenergic agonism. Epinephrine and norepinephrine are endogenous and broad-spectrum. More selective agonists are more useful in pharmacology.

An adrenergic agent is a drug, or other substance, which has effects similar to, or the same as, epinephrine (adrenaline). Thus, it is a kind of sympathomimetic agent. Alternatively, it may refer to something which is susceptible to epinephrine, or similar substances, such as a biological receptor (specifically, the adrenergic receptors).

== Receptors ==
Directly acting adrenergic agonists act on adrenergic receptors. All adrenergic receptors are G-protein coupled, activating signal transduction pathways. The G-protein receptor can affect the function of adenylate cyclase or phospholipase C, an agonist of the receptor will upregulate the effects on the downstream pathway (it will not necessarily upregulate the pathway itself).

The receptors are broadly grouped into α and β receptors. There are two subclasses of α-receptor, α_{1} and α_{2} which are further subdivided into α_{1A}, α_{1B}, α_{1D}, α_{2A}, α_{2B} and α_{2C}. The α_{2C} receptor has been reclassed from α_{1C}, due to its greater homology with the α_{2} class, giving rise to the somewhat confusing nomenclature. The β receptors are divided into β_{1}, β_{2} and β_{3}. The receptors are classed physiologically, though pharmacological selectivity for receptor subtypes exists and is important in the clinical application of adrenergic agonists (and, indeed, antagonists).

From an overall perspective, α_{1} receptors activate phospholipase C (via G_{q}), increasing the activity of protein kinase C (PKC); α_{2} receptors inhibit adenylate cyclase (via G_{i}), decreasing the activity of protein kinase A (PKA); β receptors activate adenylate cyclase (via G_{s}), thus increasing the activity of PKA. Agonists of each class of receptor elicit these downstream responses.

== Uptake and storage ==
Indirectly acting adrenergic agonists affect the uptake and storage mechanisms involved in adrenergic signalling.

Two uptake mechanisms exist for terminating the action of adrenergic catecholamines - uptake 1 and uptake 2. Uptake 1 occurs at the presynaptic nerve terminal to remove the neurotransmitter from the synapse. Uptake 2 occurs at postsynaptic and peripheral cells to prevent the neurotransmitter from diffusing laterally.

There is also enzymatic degradation of the catecholamines by two main enzymes — monoamine oxidase and catechol-o-methyl transferase. Respectively, these enzymes oxidise monoamines (including catecholamines) and methylate the hydroxyl groups of the phenyl moiety of catecholamines. These enzymes can be targeted pharmacologically. Inhibitors of these enzymes act as indirect agonists of adrenergic receptors as they prolong the action of catecholamines at the receptors.

== Structure–activity relationship ==
In general, a primary or secondary aliphatic amine separated by 2 carbons from a substituted benzene ring is minimally required for high agonist activity.

== Mechanisms ==
A great number of drugs are available which can affect adrenergic receptors. Other drugs affect the uptake and storage mechanisms of adrenergic catecholamines, prolonging their action. The following headings provide some useful examples to illustrate the various ways in which drugs can enhance the effects of adrenergic receptors.

=== Direct action ===
These drugs act directly on one or more adrenergic receptors. According to receptor selectivity they are two types:

- Non-selective: drugs act on one or more receptors; these are:
  - Adrenaline (almost all adrenergic receptors).
  - Noradrenaline (acts on α_{1}, α_{2}, β_{1}).
  - Isoprenaline (acts on β_{1}, β_{2}, β_{3}).
  - Dopamine (acts on α_{1}, α_{2}, β_{1}, D_{1}, D_{2}).
- Selective: drugs which act on a single receptor only; these are further classified into α selective & β selective.
  - α_{1} selective: phenylephrine, methoxamine, midodrine, oxymetazoline.
  - α_{2} selective: α-methyldopa, clonidine, brimonidine, dexmedetomidine, guanfacine.
  - β_{1} selective: dobutamine.
  - β_{2} selective: salbutamol/albuterol, terbutaline, salmeterol, formoterol, pirbuterol, clenbuterol.

=== Indirect action ===
These are agents that increase neurotransmission in endogenous chemicals, namely epinephrine and norepinephrine. The most common mechanisms of action includes competitive and non-competitive reuptake inhibition and releasing agents. Examples include methylphenidate, atomoxetine, cocaine, and some amphetamine based stimulants such as 4-hydroxyamphetamine.

==== Mixed action ====
- Ephedrine
- Pseudoephedrine

==== Precursors/Prodrugs ====
- Droxidopa or L-DOPS
- L-DOPA

== See also ==
- Adrenergic receptor
- Alpha adrenergic agonist
- List of adrenergic drugs
