= Hydroxyamphetamine =

Hydroxyamphetamine may refer to:

β-Hydroxyamphetamine without stereochemistry.

- β-Hydroxyamphetamine (phenylisopropanolamine; two chiral centers and four possible stereoisomers)
  - Phenylpropanolamine (racemic phenylpropanolamine; norephedrine; (1R,2S/1S,2R)-β-hydroxyamphetamine; (±)-phenylpropanolamine)
    - (1R,2S)-Phenylpropanolamine ((1R,2S)-β-hydroxyamphetamine)
    - (1S,2R)-Phenylpropanolamine ((1S,2R)-β-hydroxyamphetamine)
  - Norpseudoephedrine (racemic norpseudoephedrine; (1S,2S/1R,2R)-β-hydroxyamphetamine; (±)-norpseudoephedrine)
    - Cathine ((1S,2S)-β-hydroxyamphetamine; D-Norpseudoephedrine; (+)-norpseudoephedrine)
    - L-Norpseudoephedrine ((1R,2R)-β-hydroxyamphetamine; (−)-norpseudoephedrine)
- Gepefrine (3-hydroxyamphetamine)
- 4-Hydroxyamphetamine
- N-Hydroxyamphetamine

== See also ==
- Hydroxymethylamphetamine
- Substituted β-hydroxyamphetamine
