= 4-Fluoroephedrine =

Analogue of ephedrine and a norepinephrine releasing agent

Clinical data
- Other names: 4-FEP; 4-Fluoro-β-hydroxy-N-methylamphetamine

Identifiers
- IUPAC name: (1S,2R)-1-(4-Fluorophenyl)-2-(methylamino)propan-1-ol
- CAS Number: 63009-92-7
- PubChem CID: 95436263
- ChemSpider: 26701426
- UNII: FUH6UKV9U8
- CompTox Dashboard (EPA): DTXSID401024289

Chemical and physical data
- Formula: C_{10}H_{14}FNO
- Molar mass: 183.226 g·mol^{−1}
- 3D model (JSmol): Interactive image
- SMILES: C[C@H]([C@H](C1=CC=C(C=C1)F)O)NC
- InChI: InChI=1S/C10H14FNO/c1-7(12-2)10(13)8-3-5-9(11)6-4-8/h3-7,10,12-13H,1-2H3/t7-,10-/m1/s1; Key:SPEQHEOLWDGWML-GMSGAONNSA-N

4-Fluoroephedrine (4-FEP) is a "novel psychoactive substance" and substituted β-hydroxyamphetamine derivative related to ephedrine.

== Pharmacology ==
Similarly to other amphetamines, 4-fluoroephedrine acts as a monoamine reuptake inhibitor and monoamine releasing agent. It specifically acts as a selective norepinephrine releasing agent. In contrast to many other amphetamines, but similarly to most cathinones, 4-fluoroephedrine lacks affinity for the human trace amine-associated receptor 1 (hTAAR1).

== Chemistry ==
4-Fluoroephedrine, also known as 4-fluoro-β-hydroxy-N-methylamphetamine, is a substituted phenethylamine, amphetamine, and β-hydroxyamphetamine derivative. It is the 4-fluoro analogue of ephedrine.

The synthesis of 4-fluoroephedrine has been described.

It can serve as a precursor in the synthesis of 4-fluoromethamphetamine (4-FMA).

The predicted log P (XLogP3) of 4-fluoroephedrine is 1.0. For comparison, the predicted log P of ephedrine is 0.9.

== History ==
4-Fluoroephedrine was first described in the scientific literature by 1991. The next mention of it in the literature was in 2013, when it was identified as a "novel psychoactive substance". The pharmacology of 4-fluoroephedrine was characterized in 2015.

== Other drugs ==
4-Fluoroephedrine is known to be a metabolite of 4-fluoromethcathinone (4-FMC; flephedrone).
