= Procaterol =

Pharmaceutical drug

Clinical data
- Trade names: Meptin, others
- Other names: CI-888; CI888; OPC-2009; OPC2009
- AHFS/Drugs.com: Micromedex Detailed Consumer Information
- Routes of administration: Oral (tablets, syrup), inhalation (DPI)
- Drug class: β_{2}-Adrenergic receptor agonist; Bronchodilator; Antiasthmatic
- ATC code: R03AC16 (WHO) R03CC08 (WHO)

Pharmacokinetic data
- Metabolism: Hepatic (extensive)
- Elimination half-life: 3.8–4.3 hours
- Duration of action: 4–12 hours
- Excretion: Urine: 70% (20% unchanged); Feces: 24% (21% unchanged)

Identifiers
- IUPAC name: (±)-(1R,2S)-rel-8-Hydroxy-5-[1-hydroxy-2-(isopropylamino)butyl]-quinolin-2(1H)-on e
- CAS Number: 72332-33-3; HCl: 59828-07-8
- PubChem CID: 4916
- DrugBank: DB01366
- ChemSpider: 599984
- UNII: X7I3EMM5K0; HCl: 4VD1BRT7T8
- KEGG: D08424
- ChEBI: CHEBI:135209
- ChEMBL: ChEMBL160519
- CompTox Dashboard (EPA): DTXSID5045673
- ECHA InfoCard: 100.069.606

Chemical and physical data
- Formula: C_{16}H_{22}N_{2}O_{3}
- Molar mass: 290.363 g·mol^{−1}
- 3D model (JSmol): Interactive image
- Chirality: Racemic mixture
- SMILES: CC(C)NC(CC)C(O)c2ccc(O)c1NC(=O)C=Cc12
- InChI: InChI=1S/C16H22N2O3/c1-4-12(17-9(2)3)16(21)11-5-7-13(19)15-10(11)6-8-14(20)18-15/h5-9,12,16-17,19,21H,4H2,1-3H3,(H,18,20); Key:FKNXQNWAXFXVNW-UHFFFAOYSA-N

Procaterol (INN), sold under the brand name Meptin among others, is a β_{2}-adrenergic receptor agonist which is used in the treatment of asthma. It has been used extensively in Japan and is available in many countries, but is not marketed in the United States or the United Kingdom. The drug is orally active and can also be used by inhalation.

Procaterol was patented in 1974 and came into medical use in 1980. It is similar to salbutamol (albuterol), but has a somewhat more prolonged action. The drug is readily oxidized in the presence of moisture and air, and requires stabilizers for use by inhalation.

== Side effects ==
Side effects of procaterol include tremors and nervousness among others.

== Chemistry ==
Procaterol is a substituted phenylisobutylamine (α-ethylphenethylamine), β-hydroxyamphetamine, and cyclized phenethylamine. It has an unusual chemical structure compared to many other β-adrenergic receptor agonists.

=== Synthesis ===
8-Hydroxycarbostyril 1 is acylated with 2-bromobutyric acid chloride 2 at the fifth position of the quinoline system, which gives the compound 3. This undergoes action of isopropylamine, forming an aminoketone, the carbonyl group of which is reduced by sodium borohydride, giving procaterol 4.

Procaterol synthesis:

=== Analogues ===
Analogues of procaterol include isoprenaline (isoproterenol), isoetarine (isoetharine), isoetarine, and salbutamol, among others.

== Society and culture ==
=== Names ===
It is also known as procaterol hydrochloride (USAN). Procaterol is available under a number of trade names (Onsukil, Masacin, Procadil and others).

== See also ==
- Substituted phenylisobutylamine
- Substituted β-hydroxyamphetamine
