= Oxyfedrine =

Chemical compound

Clinical data
- Trade names: Ildamen, Modacor, Myofedrin
- Other names: Oxyfedrin; Oxyphedrine; Oxyphedrin; Oxifedrine; Oxifedrin; Oxiphedrine; Oxiphedrin
- AHFS/Drugs.com: International Drug Names
- Routes of administration: Oral, intravenous
- Drug class: Sympathomimetic; Coronary vasodilator; β-Adrenergic receptor partial agonist; Norepinephrine releasing agent
- ATC code: C01DX03 (WHO)

Pharmacokinetic data
- Bioavailability: Oral: 85%
- Protein binding: Almost 100%
- Metabolites: • Norephedrine
- Elimination half-life: 4.2 hours
- Excretion: Urine (active metabolites 90%)

Identifiers
- IUPAC name: (RS)-3-[(2-Hydroxy-1-methyl-2-phenylethyl)amino]-1-(3-methoxyphenyl)propan-1-one
- CAS Number: 15687-41-9
- PubChem CID: 5489013
- ChemSpider: 4590049
- UNII: DWL616XF1K
- KEGG: D08321
- ChEMBL: ChEMBL1651913
- CompTox Dashboard (EPA): DTXSID0023408

Chemical and physical data
- Formula: C_{19}H_{23}NO_{3}
- Molar mass: 313.397 g·mol^{−1}
- 3D model (JSmol): Interactive image
- SMILES: C[C@@H]([C@@H](c1ccccc1)O)NCCC(=O)c2cccc(c2)OC
- InChI: InChI=1S/C19H23NO3/c1-14(19(22)15-7-4-3-5-8-15)20-12-11-18(21)16-9-6-10-17(13-16)23-2/h3-10,13-14,19-20,22H,11-12H2,1-2H3/t14-,19-/m0/s1; Key:GDYUVHBMFVMBAF-LIRRHRJNSA-N

Oxyfedrine, sold under the brand names Ildamen and Myofedrin among others, is a sympathomimetic agent and coronary vasodilator which is used in the treatment of coronary heart disease, angina pectoris, and acute myocardial infarction. It is taken by mouth or intravenously.

The drug acts as a β-adrenergic receptor partial agonist. It may also act as a norepinephrine releasing agent via its major active metabolite norephedrine. Oxyfedrine is a phenethylamine and amphetamine derivative.

Oxyfedrine has been marketed in Europe, Hong Kong, India, Central America, and elsewhere. It appears to remain marketed only in India.

== Pharmacology ==
=== Pharmacodynamics ===
Oxyfedrine is a β-adrenergic receptor partial agonist. It appears to be non-selective for the β_{1}- and β_{2}-adrenergic receptors. It is selective for the β-adrenergic receptors over the α-adrenergic receptors. However, it has also been reported to interact with the α-adrenergic receptors at high concentrations, acting as a partial agonist or antagonist of these receptors. Norephedrine, a norepinephrine releasing agent, is a major active metabolite of oxyfedrine, and hence oxyfedrine may additionally act as an indirectly acting sympathomimetic.

It has been found to depress the tonicity of coronary vessels, improve myocardial metabolism (so that heart can sustain hypoxia better) and also exert a positive chronotropic and inotropic effects, thereby not precipitating angina pectoris. The latter property (positive chronotropic and inotropic effects) is particularly important, because other vasodilators used in angina may be counter productive causing coronary steal phenomenon.

The drug is chemically and pharmacologically unrelated to any other antianginal drugs.

=== Pharmacokinetics ===
Oxyfedrine's oral bioavailability is 85%. The plasma protein binding is almost 100%. Its elimination half-life is 4.2 hours. Norephedrine is a major active metabolite of oxyfedrine. The excretion of the active metabolites of oxyfedrine is 90% in urine. About 75 to 100% of oxyfedrine is excreted as norephedrine.

== Chemistry ==
Oxyfedrine is a substituted phenethylamine and amphetamine derivative. It is l-norephedrine with a bulky and lipophilic 3-methoxypropiophenone substituent at the nitrogen atom.

=== Synthesis ===
Mannich condensation of phenylpropanolamine (1) with formaldehyde and m-acetanisole (3-acetylanisole) (2) yields oxyfedrine (3).

== Research ==
Synergistic effects of oxyfedrine with antibiotics against bacteria have been suggested.
