= Hexapradol =

Group of stereoisomers

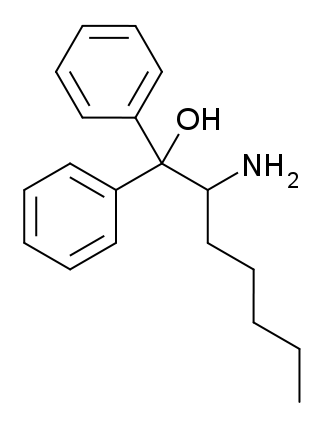

Clinical data
- Other names: α-Butyl-β-hydroxy-β-phenylamphetamine; α-Pentyl-β-hydroxy-β-phenyl-2-phenethylamine; β-Phenyl-2-phenylheptanolamine
- ATC code: None

Identifiers
- IUPAC name: 2-amino-1,1-diphenyl-1-heptanol
- CAS Number: 15599-37-8
- PubChem CID: 219120
- ChemSpider: 189933
- UNII: I71G9YBD89
- ChEMBL: ChEMBL2107201
- CompTox Dashboard (EPA): DTXSID60864605

Chemical and physical data
- Formula: C_{19}H_{25}NO
- Molar mass: 283.415 g·mol^{−1}
- 3D model (JSmol): Interactive image
- SMILES: OC(c1ccccc1)(c2ccccc2)C(N)CCCCC
- InChI: InChI=1S/C19H25NO/c1-2-3-6-15-18(20)19(21,16-11-7-4-8-12-16)17-13-9-5-10-14-17/h4-5,7-14,18,21H,2-3,6,15,20H2,1H3; Key:ZVRZJTRBWTVKOJ-UHFFFAOYSA-N

Hexapradol (INN) is a psychostimulant drug which was never marketed.

It also had cytoprotective/antiulcer properties.

== Synthesis ==
Synthesis methods are described.

== See also ==
- β-Phenylmethamphetamine
- 3,3-Diphenylcyclobutanamine
- Phenylpropanolamine
- Pipradrol
