= Hydroxymethylamphetamine =

Hydroxymethylamphetamine, or hydroxymethamphetamine, also known as phenylpropanolmethylamine, may refer to:

β-Hydroxy-N-methylamphetamine without stereochemistry.

- β-Hydroxy-N-methylamphetamine (two chiral centers and four possible stereoisomers)
  - Racephedrine (racemic ephedrine; (1R,2S/1S,2R)-ephedrine)
    - (1R,2S)-Ephedrine (ephedrine)
    - (1S,2R)-Ephedrine
  - Racemic pseudoephedrine ((1R,2R/1S,2S)-pseudoephedrine)
    - (1S,2S)-Pseudoephedrine (pseudoephedrine)
    - (1R,2R)-Pseudoephedrine
- Pholedrine (4-hydroxy-N-methylamphetamine)
- N-Hydroxymethamphetamine (N-hydroxy-N-methylamphetamine)

== See also ==
- Hydroxyamphetamine
- Substituted β-hydroxyamphetamine
