= Butaxamine =

Mixture of isomers

Clinical data
- Other names: Butoxamine; BW 64-9; N-tert-Butyl-β-hydroxy-2,5-dimethoxyamphetamine; β-Hydroxy-N-tert-butyl-2,5-DMA; β-Hydroxy-N-tert-butyl-DOH
- ATC code: None

Identifiers
- IUPAC name: (1S,2S)-1-(2,5-Dimethoxyphenyl)-2-(tert-butylamino)propan-1-ol
- CAS Number: 1937-89-9
- PubChem CID: 134495
- ChemSpider: 118552
- UNII: 0NM31M53PW
- ChEMBL: ChEMBL289093

Chemical and physical data
- Formula: C_{15}H_{25}NO_{3}
- Molar mass: 267.369 g·mol^{−1}
- 3D model (JSmol): Interactive image
- SMILES: C[C@@H]([C@@H](C1=C(C=CC(=C1)OC)OC)O)NC(C)(C)C
- InChI: InChI=1S/C15H25NO3/c1-10(16-15(2,3)4)14(17)12-9-11(18-5)7-8-13(12)19-6/h7-10,14,16-17H,1-6H3/t10-,14-/m0/s1; Key:TWUSDDMONZULSC-HZMBPMFUSA-N

Butaxamine (INN; also known as butoxamine or as BW 64-9) is a β_{2}-selective beta blocker. Its primary use is in experimental situations in which blockade of β_{2} receptors is necessary to determine the activity of the drug (i.e. if the β_{2} receptor is completely blocked, but the given effect is still present, the given effect is not a characteristic of the β_{2} receptor). It has no clinical use. An alternative name is α-(1-[tert-butylamino]ethyl)-2,5-dimethoxybenzyl alcohol.

== See also ==
- Substituted amphetamine
- BOx (psychedelics)
- Bupropion
- Methoxamine
