= Isoetarine =

Chemical compound

Isoetharine

Clinical data
- Pronunciation: /aɪsoʊˈɛθəriːn/ eye-soh-ETH-ə-reen
- Trade names: Bronkosol and Bronkometer (USAN name is isoetharine)
- AHFS/Drugs.com: International Drug Names
- MedlinePlus: a682862
- ATC code: R03AC07 (WHO)

Legal status
- Legal status: AU: S4 (Prescription only)

Identifiers
- IUPAC name: (RS)-4-[1-hydroxy-2-(isopropylamino)butyl]benzene-1,2-diol
- CAS Number: 79490-84-9
- PubChem CID: 3762
- IUPHAR/BPS: 7205
- DrugBank: DB00221
- ChemSpider: 3630
- UNII: YV0SN3276Q
- KEGG: D04625
- ChEMBL: ChEMBL1201213
- CompTox Dashboard (EPA): DTXSID9048560
- ECHA InfoCard: 100.007.703

Chemical and physical data
- Formula: C_{13}H_{21}NO_{3}
- Molar mass: 239.315 g·mol^{−1}
- 3D model (JSmol): Interactive image
- Chirality: Racemic mixture
- SMILES: Oc1ccc(cc1O)C(O)C(NC(C)C)CC
- InChI: InChI=1S/C13H21NO3/c1-4-10(14-8(2)3)13(17)9-5-6-11(15)12(16)7-9/h5-8,10,13-17H,4H2,1-3H3; Key:HUYWAWARQUIQLE-UHFFFAOYSA-N

Isoetharine is a selective short-acting β_{2} adrenoreceptor agonist. It can be called the "granddaughter of adrenalin" in the line of β_{2} agonists that gave quick relief for bronchospasm and asthma. Epinephrine (adrenalin) was the first of these, and next came isoprenaline (isoproterenol). Isoetharine was the third drug in this line, thus the third generation or granddaughter of the original.

In the western United States, it was the drug of choice in the late 1970s and early 1980s for nebulization ("breathing treatment") to relieve airway spasm. It generally gave sharp relief of shortness of breath, starting within two to five minutes after the patient began breathing the nebulized mist. This rapid onset is not as clearly present in later drugs.

All of the early β_{2} agonist catecholamines used for bronchospasm had strong side effects, with increase in heart rate as the most common and most problematic. This came because its "β_{2} effect" was not quite as selective as might be hoped. β_{1} receptors appeared to also be stimulated in some patients, causing cardiac and other CNS side effects. With isoetharine this effect tended to be transient and usually went away within a matter of minutes after the end of the treatment. Increase in blood pressure also occurred in a small but significant percentage of cases, but also was almost invariably transient.

By the late 1980s, isoetharine was largely replaced by orciprenaline (metaproterenol), which seemed to have slightly less cardiac side effect and lasted a couple of hours longer. Orciprenaline in turn was replaced by salbutamol (albuterol). Some practitioners still believe that these later aerosolized bronchodilators never gave quite as quick of relief from asthmatic shortness of breath as did isoetharine. Thus they see a continued specialty role in treatment of severe shortness of breath that does not improve in the first five minutes of salbutamol treatment.
