= Ephedrine =

Medication, stimulant and decongestant

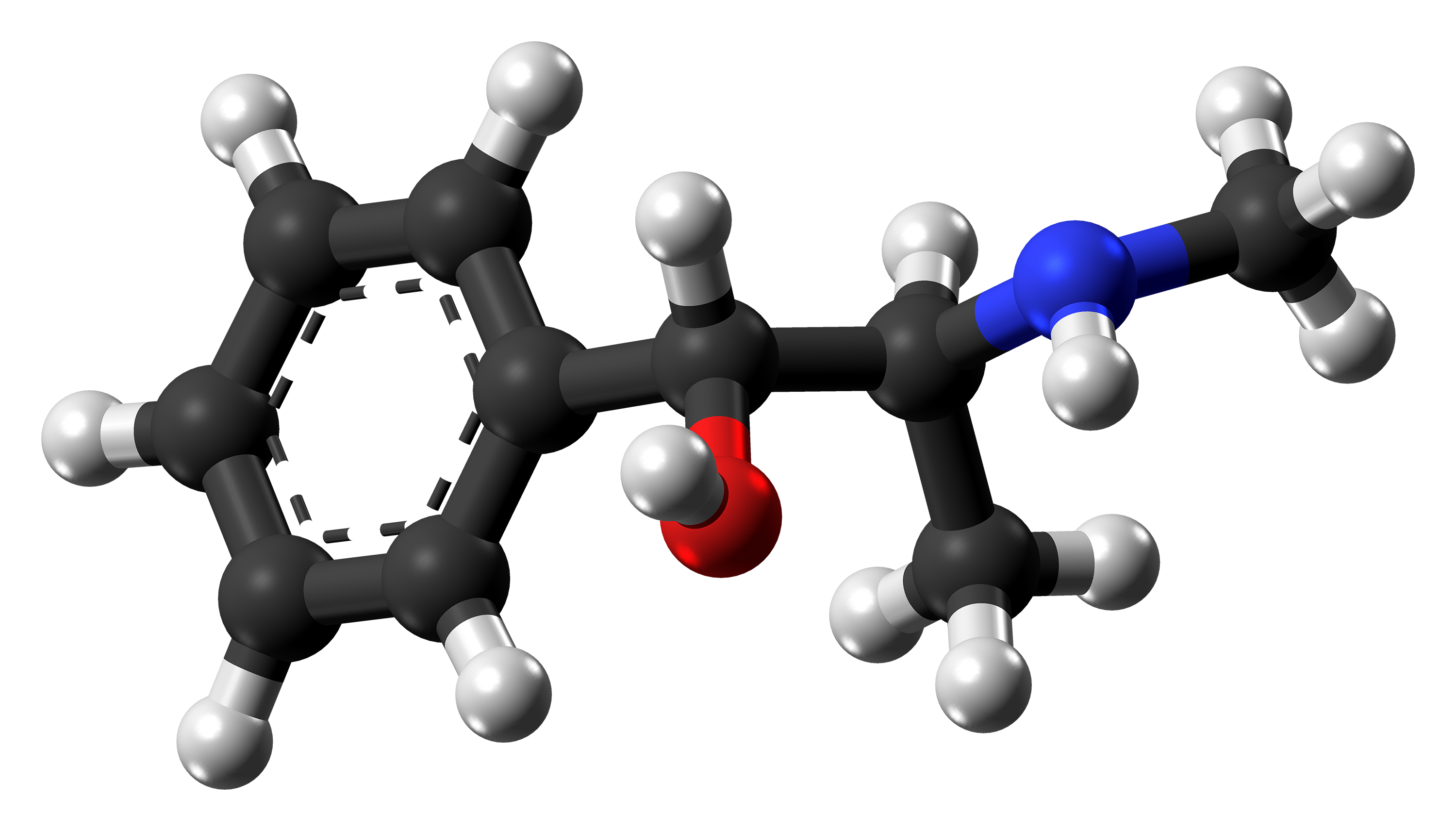
- (−)-(1R,2S)-ephedrine chemical structure (top) and ball-and-stick model (bottom)

Clinical data
- Pronunciation: /ɪˈfɛdrɪn/ or /ˈɛfɪdriːn/
- Trade names: Akovaz, Corphedra, Emerphed, others
- Other names: (−)-Ephedrine; (1R,2S)-Ephedrine; (1R,2S)-β-Hydroxy-N-methylamphetamine; (1R,2S)-β-Hydroxy-N-methyl-α-methyl-β-phenethylamine
- AHFS/Drugs.com: Ephedrine: Monograph; HCl: Monograph; Sulfate: Monograph
- Pregnancy category: AU: A
- Dependence liability: Physiological: Low: Psychological: Moderate
- Addiction liability: Moderate
- Routes of administration: By mouth, intravenous (IV), intramuscular (IM), subcutaneous (SC)
- Drug class: Stimulant; Norepinephrine releasing agent
- ATC code: C01CA26 (WHO) R01AA03 (WHO), R01AB05 (WHO) (combinations), R03CA02 (WHO), S01FB02 (WHO), QG04BX90 (WHO)

Legal status
- Legal status: AU: S4 (Prescription only); BR: Class D1 (Drug precursors); CA: Schedule VI; UK: POM (Prescription only) / P; US: ℞-only / OTC; EU: Rx-only / OTC; SE: Rx-only

Pharmacokinetic data
- Bioavailability: 88%
- Protein binding: ~24–29% (5–10% to albumin)
- Metabolism: Largely unmetabolized
- Metabolites: • Norephedrine
- Onset of action: Oral: 15–60 minutes IM: 10–20 minutes IV: Rapid
- Elimination half-life: 6 hours
- Duration of action: Oral: 2–4 hours IV/IM: 60 minutes
- Excretion: Mainly urine (60% unchanged)

Identifiers
- IUPAC name: (1R,2S)-2-(methylamino)-1-phenylpropan-1-ol
- CAS Number: 299-42-3 50-98-6 (hydrochloride); as sulfate: 134-72-5
- PubChem CID: 9294
- IUPHAR/BPS: 556
- DrugBank: DB01364
- ChemSpider: 8935; as sulfate: 4514262
- UNII: GN83C131XS; as sulfate: U6X61U5ZEG
- KEGG: D00124; as sulfate: D04018
- ChEBI: CHEBI:15407
- ChEMBL: ChEMBL211456; as sulfate: ChEMBL1523964
- CompTox Dashboard (EPA): DTXSID0022985
- ECHA InfoCard: 100.005.528

Chemical and physical data
- Formula: C_{10}H_{15}NO
- Molar mass: 165.236 g·mol^{−1}
- 3D model (JSmol): Interactive image
- SMILES: C[C@@H]([C@@H](C1=CC=CC=C1)O)NC
- InChI: InChI=1S/C10H15NO/c1-8(11-2)10(12)9-6-4-3-5-7-9/h3-8,10-12H,1-2H3/t8-,10-/m0/s1; Key:KWGRBVOPPLSCSI-WPRPVWTQSA-N

Ephedrine is a central nervous system (CNS) stimulant and sympathomimetic agent that is often used to prevent low blood pressure during anesthesia. It has also been used for asthma, narcolepsy, and obesity but is not the preferred treatment. It is of unclear benefit in nasal congestion. It can be taken by mouth or by injection into a muscle, vein, or just under the skin. Onset with intravenous use is fast, while injection into a muscle can take 20 minutes, and by mouth can take an hour for effect. When given by injection, it lasts about an hour, and when taken by mouth, it can last up to four hours.

Common side effects include trouble sleeping, anxiety, headache, hallucinations, high blood pressure, fast heart rate, loss of appetite, and urinary retention. Serious side effects include stroke and heart attack. While probably safe in pregnancy, its use in this population is poorly studied. Use during breastfeeding is not recommended. Ephedrine works by inducing the release of norepinephrine and hence indirectly activating the α- and β-adrenergic receptors. Chemically, ephedrine is a substituted amphetamine and is the (1R,2S)-enantiomer of β-hydroxy-N-methylamphetamine.

Ephedrine was first isolated in 1885 and came into commercial use in 1926. It is on the World Health Organization's List of Essential Medicines. It is available as a generic medication. It can normally be found in plants of the Ephedra genus. Over-the-counter dietary supplements containing ephedrine are illegal in the United States, with the exception of those used in traditional Chinese medicine, where its presence is noted by má huáng.

== Medical uses ==
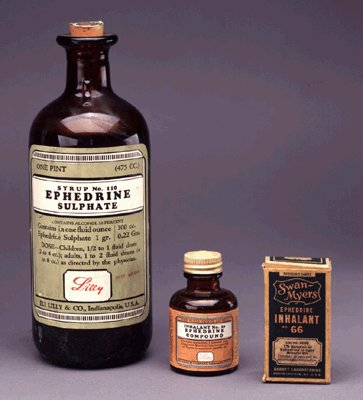
Ephedrine Sulphate (1932), Ephedrine Compound (1932), and Swan-Myers Ephedrine Inhalant No. 66 (circa 1940).

Ephedrine is a non-catecholamine sympathomimetic with cardiovascular effects similar to those of adrenaline (epinephrine): increased blood pressure, heart rate, and contractility. Like pseudoephedrine, it is a bronchodilator, with pseudoephedrine having considerably less effect.

Ephedrine may decrease motion sickness, but it has mainly been used to decrease the sedating effects of other medications used for motion sickness.

Ephedrine is also found to have quick and long-lasting responsiveness in congenital myasthenic syndrome in early childhood and also even in adults with a novel COLQ mutation.

Ephedrine is administered by intravenous boluses. Redosing usually requires increased doses to offset the development of tachyphylaxis, which is attributed to the depletion of catecholamine stores.

=== Weight loss ===
Ephedrine promotes modest short-term weight loss, specifically fat loss, but its long-term effects are unknown. In mice, ephedrine is known to stimulate thermogenesis in the brown adipose tissue, but because adult humans have only small amounts of brown fat, thermogenesis is assumed to take place mostly in the skeletal muscle. Ephedrine also decreases gastric emptying. Methylxanthines such as caffeine and theophylline have a synergistic effect with ephedrine for weight loss. This led to the creation and marketing of compound products. One of them, known as the ECA stack, contains ephedrine with caffeine and aspirin. It is a popular supplement taken by bodybuilders seeking to cut body fat before a competition. A 2021 systematic review found that ephedrine taken in doses from 60 mg to 150mg, with or without caffeine, for 4 to 24 weeks led to a 2 kilograms (4.4 lb) weight loss greater than placebo, raised heart rate, and reduced LDL and raised HDL, with no statistically significant difference in blood pressure.

=== Available forms ===
Ephedrine is available as a prescription-only pharmaceutical drug in the form of an intravenous solution, under brand names including Akovaz, Corphedra, Emerphed, and Rezipres as well as in generic forms, in the United States. It is also available over-the-counter in the form of 12.5 and 25 mg oral tablets for use as a bronchodilator and as a 0.5% concentration nasal spray for use as a decongestant. The drug is additionally available in combination with guaifenesin in the form of oral tablets and liquids. Ephedrine is provided as the hydrochloride or sulfate salt in pharmaceutical formulations.

== Contraindications ==
Ephedrine should not be used in conjunction with certain antidepressants, namely norepinephrine–dopamine reuptake inhibitors (NDRIs), as this increases the risk of symptoms due to excessive serum levels of norepinephrine.

Bupropion is an example of an antidepressant with an amphetamine-like structure similar to ephedrine, and it is an NDRI. Its action bears more resemblance to amphetamine than to fluoxetine in that its primary mode of therapeutic action involves norepinephrine and to a lesser degree dopamine. It should not be used in combination with ephedrine, as these effects may potentiate one another.

Ephedrine should be used with caution in patients with inadequate fluid replacement, impaired adrenal function, hypoxia, hypercapnia, acidosis, hypertension, hyperthyroidism, prostatic hypertrophy, diabetes mellitus, cardiovascular disease, during delivery if maternal blood pressure is >130/80 mmHg, and during lactation.

Contraindications for the use of ephedrine include: closed-angle glaucoma, phaeochromocytoma, asymmetric septal hypertrophy (idiopathic hypertrophic subaortic stenosis), concomitant or recent (previous 14 days) monoamine oxidase inhibitor (MAOI) therapy, general anesthesia with halogenated hydrocarbons (particularly halothane), tachyarrhythmias or ventricular fibrillation, or hypersensitivity to ephedrine or other stimulants.

Ephedrine should not be used at any time during pregnancy unless specifically indicated by a qualified physician and only when other options are unavailable.

== Side effects ==
Ephedrine is a potentially dangerous natural compound; as of 2004 the US Food and Drug Administration (FDA) had received over 18,000 reports of adverse effects in people using it.

Adverse drug reactions (ADRs) are more common with systemic administration (e.g. injection or oral administration) compared to topical administration (e.g. nasal instillations). ADRs associated with ephedrine therapy include

- Cardiovascular: tachycardia, cardiac arrhythmias, angina pectoris, vasoconstriction with hypertension
- Dermatological: flushing, sweating, acne vulgaris
- Gastrointestinal: nausea
- Genitourinary: decreased urination due to vasoconstriction of renal arteries, difficulty urinating is not uncommon, as alpha-agonists such as ephedrine constrict the internal urethral sphincter, mimicking the effects of sympathetic nervous system stimulation
- Nervous system: restlessness, confusion, insomnia, mild euphoria, mania/hallucinations (rare except in previously existing psychiatric conditions), delusions, formication (may be possible, but lacks documented evidence) paranoia, hostility, panic, agitation
- Respiratory: dyspnea, pulmonary edema
- Miscellaneous: dizziness, headache, tremor, hyperglycemic reactions, dry mouth

== Overdose ==
Overdose of ephedrine may result in sympathomimetic symptoms like tachycardia and hypertension.

== Interactions ==
Ephedrine with monoamine oxidase inhibitors (MAOIs) like phenelzine and tranylcypromine can result in hypertensive crisis.

== Pharmacology ==
=== Pharmacodynamics ===
Monoamine release by ephedrine and related agents (EC_{50}, nM)
Compound	NE	DA	5-HT	Ref
Dextroamphetamine (S(+)-amphetamine)	6.6–7.2	5.8–24.8	698–1765	
S(–)-Cathinone	12.4	18.5	2366	
Ephedrine ((–)-ephedrine)	43.1–72.4	236–1350	>10000	
(+)-Ephedrine	218	2104	>10000	
Dextromethamphetamine (S(+)-methamphetamine)	12.3–13.8	8.5–24.5	736–1291.7	
Levomethamphetamine (R(–)-methamphetamine)	28.5	416	4640	
(+)-Phenylpropanolamine ((+)-norephedrine)	42.1	302	>10000	
(–)-Phenylpropanolamine ((–)-norephedrine)	137	1371	>10000	
Cathine ((+)-norpseudoephedrine)	15.0	68.3	>10000	
(–)-Norpseudoephedrine	30.1	294	>10000	
(–)-Pseudoephedrine	4092	9125	>10000	
Pseudoephedrine ((+)-pseudoephedrine)	224	1988	>10000	
Notes: The smaller the value, the more strongly the substance releases the neurotransmitter. See also Monoamine releasing agent § Activity profiles for a larger table with more compounds.

Ephedrine, a sympathomimetic amine, acts on part of the sympathetic nervous system (SNS). The principal mechanism of action relies on its indirect stimulation of the adrenergic receptor system by increasing activation of α- and β-adrenergic receptors via induction of norepinephrine release. The presence of direct interactions with α-adrenergic receptors is unlikely but still controversial. L-ephedrine, and particularly its stereoisomer norpseudoephedrine (which is also present in Catha edulis) has indirect sympathomimetic effects and due to its ability to cross the blood–brain barrier, it is a CNS stimulant similar to amphetamines, but less pronounced, as it releases norepinephrine and dopamine in the brain.

=== Pharmacokinetics ===
==== Absorption ====
The oral bioavailability of ephedrine is 88%. The onset of action of ephedrine orally is 15 to 60 minutes, via intramuscular injection is 10 to 20 minutes, and via intravenous infusion is within seconds.

==== Distribution ====
Its plasma protein binding is approximately 24 to 29%, with 5 to 10% bound to albumin.

==== Metabolism ====
Ephedrine is largely not metabolized. Norephedrine (phenylpropanolamine) is an active metabolite of ephedrine formed via N-demethylation. About 8 to 20% of an oral dose of ephedrine is demethylated into norephedrine, about 4 to 13% is oxidatively deaminated into benzoic acid, and a small fraction is converted into 1,2-dihydroxy-1-phenylpropane.

==== Elimination ====
Ephedrine is eliminated mainly in urine, with 60% (range 53–79%) excreted unchanged.

The elimination half-life of ephedrine is 6 hours. Its duration of action orally is 2 to 4 hours and via intravenous or intramuscular injection is 60 minutes.

The elimination of ephedrine is dependent on urinary pH.

== Chemistry ==
Ephedrine, or (−)-(1R,2S)-ephedrine, also known as (1R,2S)-β-hydroxy-N-methyl-α-methyl-β-phenethylamine or as (1R,2S)-β-hydroxy-N-methylamphetamine, is a substituted phenethylamine and amphetamine derivative. It is similar in chemical structure to phenylpropanolamine, methamphetamine, and epinephrine (adrenaline). It differs from methamphetamine only by the presence of a hydroxyl group (–OH). Chemically, ephedrine is an alkaloid with a phenethylamine skeleton found in various plants in the genus Ephedra (family Ephedraceae). It is most usually marketed as the hydrochloride or sulfate salt.

Ephedrine has an experimental log P of 1.13, while its predicted log P values range from 0.9 to 1.32. The lipophilicity of amphetamines is closely related to their brain permeability. For comparison to ephedrine, the experimental log P of methamphetamine is 2.1, of amphetamine is 1.8, of pseudoephedrine is 0.89, of phenylpropanolamine is 0.7, of phenylephrine is -0.3, and of norepinephrine is -1.2. Methamphetamine has high brain permeability, whereas phenylephrine and norepinephrine are peripherally selective drugs. The optimal log P for brain permeation and central activity is about 2.1 (range 1.5–2.7).

Ephedrine hydrochloride has a melting point of 187−188 °C.

The racemic form of ephedrine is racephedrine ((±)-ephedrine; dl-ephedrine; (1RS,2SR)-ephedrine). A stereoisomer of ephedrine is pseudoephedrine. Derivatives of ephedrine include methylephedrine (N-methylephedrine), etafedrine (N-ethylephedrine), cinnamedrine (N-cinnamylephedrine), and oxilofrine (4-hydroxyephedrine). Analogues of ephedrine include phenylpropanolamine (norephedrine) and metaraminol (3-hydroxynorephedrine).

The presence of an N-methyl group decreases binding affinities at α-adrenergic receptors, compared with norephedrine. Ephedrine, though, binds better than N-methylephedrine, which has an additional methyl group at the nitrogen atom. Also, the steric orientation of the hydroxyl group is important for receptor binding and functional activity.

=== Nomenclature ===
The four stereoisomers of ephedrine.

Ephedrine exhibits optical isomerism and has two chiral centres, giving rise to four stereoisomers. By convention, the pair of enantiomers with the stereochemistry (1R,2S) and (1S,2R) is designated ephedrine, while the pair of enantiomers with the stereochemistry (1R,2R) and (1S,2S) is called pseudoephedrine.

The isomer which is marketed is (−)-(1R,2S)-ephedrine.

In the outdated D/L system (+)-ephedrine is also referred to as D-ephedrine and (−)-ephedrine as L-ephedrine (in which case, in the Fischer projection, the phenyl ring is drawn at the bottom).

Often, the D/L system (with small caps) and the d/l system (with lower-case) are confused. The result is that the levorotary l-ephedrine is wrongly named L-ephedrine and the dextrorotary d-pseudoephedrine (the diastereomer) wrongly D-pseudoephedrine.

The IUPAC names of the two enantiomers are (1R,2S)- respectively (1S,2R)-2-methylamino-1-phenylpropan-1-ol. A synonym is erythro-ephedrine.

=== Detection in body fluids ===
Ephedrine may be quantified in blood, plasma, or urine to monitor possible abuse by athletes, confirm a diagnosis of poisoning, or assist in a medicolegal death investigation. Many commercial immunoassay screening tests directed at the amphetamines cross-react appreciably with ephedrine, but chromatographic techniques can easily distinguish ephedrine from other phenethylamine derivatives. Blood or plasma ephedrine concentrations are typically in the 20–200 μg/L range in persons taking the drug therapeutically, 300–3000 μg/L in abusers or poisoned patients, and 3–20 mg/L in cases of acute fatal overdosage. The current World Anti-Doping Agency (WADA) limit for ephedrine in an athlete's urine is 10 μg/mL.

== History ==
=== Asia ===
Ephedrine in its natural form, known as máhuáng (麻黄) in traditional Chinese medicine, has been documented in China since the Han dynasty (206 BC – 220 AD) as an antiasthmatic and stimulant. In traditional Chinese medicine, máhuáng has been used as a treatment for asthma and bronchitis for centuries.

In 1885, the chemical synthesis of ephedrine was first accomplished by Japanese organic chemist Nagai Nagayoshi based on his research on traditional Japanese and Chinese herbal medicines.

The industrial manufacture of ephedrine in China began in the 1920s, when Merck began marketing and selling the drug as ephetonin. Ephedrine exports from China to the West grew from 4 to 216 tonnes between 1926 and 1928.

=== Western medicine ===
Ephedrine was first introduced for medical use in the United States in 1926.

It was introduced in 1948 in Vicks Vatronol nose drops (now discontinued) which contained ephedrine sulfate as the active ingredient for rapid nasal decongestion.

== Society and culture ==
=== Names ===
Ephedrine is the generic name of the drug and its BAN. Its DCF is ephédrine while its DCIT is efedrina. In the case of the hydrochloride salt, its generic name is ephedrine hydrochloride and this is its USAN, BANM, and JAN. In the case of the sulfate salt, its generic name is ephedrine sulfate or ephedrine sulphate and the former is its USAN while the latter is its BANM. A synonym of ephedrine sulfate is isofedrol. These names all refer to the (1R,2R)-enantiomer of ephedrine. The racemic form of ephedrine is known as racephedrine and this is its INN and BAN, while the hydrochloride salt of the racemic form is racephedrine hydrochloride and this is its USAN.

=== Recreational use ===
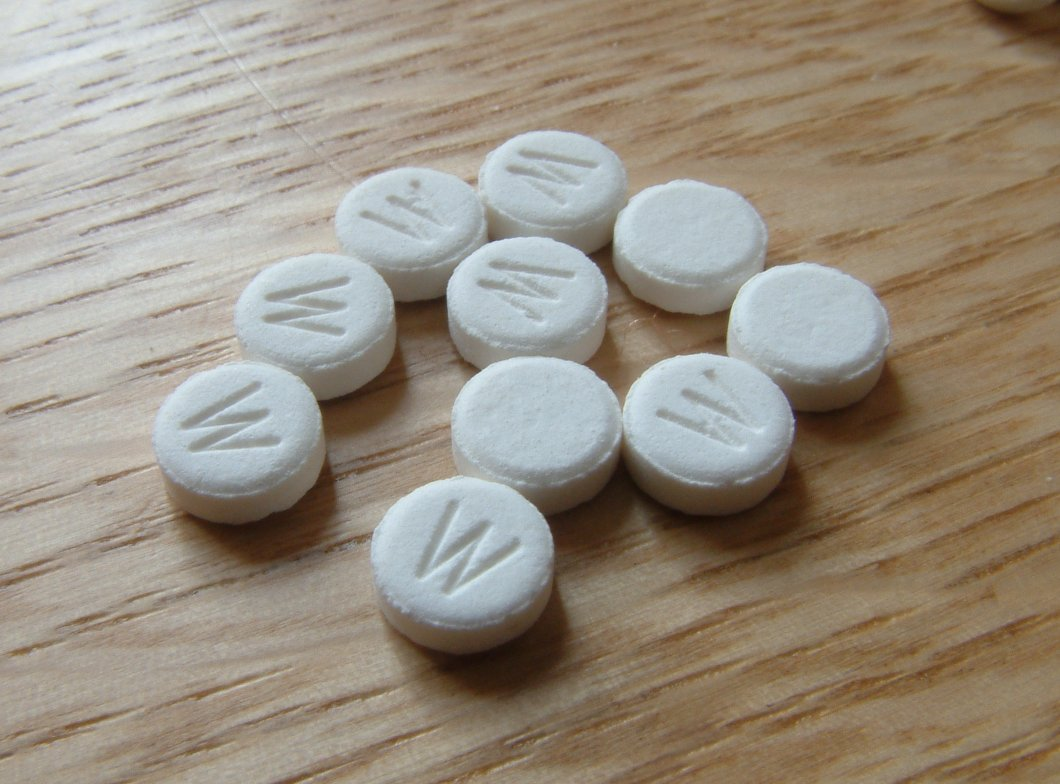
Ephedrine tablets.

As a phenethylamine, ephedrine has a similar chemical structure to amphetamines and is a methamphetamine analog having the methamphetamine structure with a hydroxyl group at the β position. Because of ephedrine's structural similarity to methamphetamine, it can be used to create methamphetamine using chemical reduction in which ephedrine's hydroxyl group is removed; this has made ephedrine a highly sought-after chemical precursor in the illicit manufacture of methamphetamine.

The most popular method for reducing ephedrine to methamphetamine is similar to the Birch reduction, in that it uses anhydrous ammonia and lithium metal in the reaction. The second-most popular method uses red phosphorus and iodine in the reaction with ephedrine. Moreover, ephedrine can be synthesized into methcathinone via simple oxidation. As such, ephedrine is listed as a table-I precursor under the United Nations Convention Against Illicit Traffic in Narcotic Drugs and Psychotropic Substances.

=== Use in exercise and sports ===
Ephedrine has been used as a performance-enhancing drug in exercise and sports. It can increase heart rate, blood pressure, and cardiac contractility as well as act as a psychostimulant. Ephedrine is often used in combination with caffeine for performance-enhancing purposes.

=== Other uses ===
In chemical synthesis, ephedrine is used in bulk quantities as a chiral auxiliary group.

In saquinavir synthesis, the half-acid is resolved as its salt with l-ephedrine.

=== Legal status ===
==== Canada ====
In January 2002, Health Canada issued a voluntary recall of all ephedrine products containing more than 8 mg per dose, all combinations of ephedrine with other stimulants such as caffeine, and all ephedrine products marketed for weight-loss or bodybuilding indications, citing a serious risk to health. Ephedrine is still sold as an oral nasal decongestant in 8 mg pills as a natural health product (NHP), with a limit of 0.4 g (400 mg) per package, the limit established by the Controlled Drugs and Substances Act as it is considered as Class A Precursor.

NHPs containing ephedrine or pseudoephdrine as their sole active ingredients are restricted to being behind-the-counter at pharmacies, requiring customers to request them from the pharmacist. Combination NHPs containing other ingredients can be in a regular pharmacy self-selection area for purchase, but are still restricted to pharmacies and a pharmacist must be available to answer questions from a customer if necessary.

==== United States ====
In 1997, the FDA proposed a regulation on ephedra (the herb from which ephedrine is obtained), which limited an ephedra dose to 8 mg (of active ephedrine) with no more than 24 mg per day. This proposed rule was withdrawn, in part, in 2000 because of "concerns regarding the agency's basis for proposing a certain dietary ingredient level and a duration of use limit for these products." In 2004, the FDA created a ban on ephedrine alkaloids marketed for reasons other than asthma, colds, allergies, other disease, or traditional Asian use. On April 14, 2005, the U.S. District Court for the District of Utah ruled the FDA did not have proper evidence that low dosages of ephedrine alkaloids are actually unsafe, but on August 17, 2006, the U.S. Court of Appeals for the Tenth Circuit in Denver upheld the FDA's final rule declaring all dietary supplements containing ephedrine alkaloids adulterated, and therefore illegal for marketing in the United States. Furthermore, ephedrine is banned by the NCAA, MLB, NFL, and PGA. Ephedrine is, however, still legal in many applications outside of dietary supplements. Purchasing is currently limited and monitored, with specifics varying from state to state.

The House passed the Combat Methamphetamine Epidemic Act of 2005 as an amendment to the renewal of the USA PATRIOT Act. Signed into law by President George W. Bush on March 6, 2006, the act amended the US Code (21 USC 830) concerning the sale of products containing ephedrine and the closely related drug pseudoephedrine. Both substances are used as precursors in the illicit production of methamphetamine, and to discourage that use the federal statute included the following requirements for merchants who sell these products:

- A retrievable record of all purchases identifying the name and address of each party to be kept for two years
- Required verification of proof of identity of all purchasers
- Required protection and disclosure methods in the collection of personal information
- Reports to the Attorney General of any suspicious payments or disappearances of the regulated products
- Non-liquid dose form of regulated product may only be sold in unit-dose blister packs
- Regulated products are to be sold behind the counter or in a locked cabinet in such a way as to restrict access
- Daily sales of regulated products not to exceed 3.6 g to a single purchaser, without regard to the number of transactions
- Monthly sales to a single purchaser not to exceed 9 g of pseudoephedrine base in regulated products

The law gives similar regulations to mail-order purchases, except the monthly sales limit is 7.5 g.

As a pure herb or tea, má huáng, containing ephedrine, is still sold legally in the US. The law restricts/prohibits its being sold as a dietary supplement (pill) or as an ingredient/additive to other products, like diet pills.

==== Australia ====
Ephedrine and all Ephedra species that contain it are considered Schedule 4 substances under the Poisons Standard. A Schedule 4 drug is considered a Prescription Only Medicine, or Prescription Animal Remedy – Substances, the use or supply of which should be by or on the order of persons permitted by State or Territory legislation to prescribe and should be available from a pharmacist on prescription under the Poisons Standard.

==== South Africa ====
In South Africa, ephedrine was moved to schedule 6 on 27 May 2008, which makes pure ephedrine tablets prescription only. Pills containing ephedrine up to 30 mg per tablet in combination with other medications are still available OTC, schedule 1 and 2, for sinus, head colds, and influenza.

==== Germany ====
Ephedrine was freely available in pharmacies in Germany until 2001. Afterward, access was restricted since it was mostly bought for unindicated uses. Similarly, ephedra can only be bought with a prescription. Since April 2006, all products, including plant parts, that contain ephedrine are only available with a prescription.

== Production ==
=== Agricultural ===
Ephedrine is obtained from the plant Ephedra sinica and other members of the genus Ephedra, from which the name of the substance is derived. Raw materials for the manufacture of ephedrine and traditional Chinese medicines are produced in China on a large scale. As of 2007, companies produced for export US$13 million worth of ephedrine from 30,000 tons of ephedra annually, or about ten times the amount used in traditional Chinese medicine.

=== Synthetic ===
Most of the l-ephedrine produced today for official medical use is made synthetically as the extraction and isolation process from E. sinica is tedious and no longer cost-effective.

=== Biosynthetic ===
Proposed biosynthetic pathway of ephedrine from L-phenylalanine and pyruvic acid.

Ephedrine was long thought to come from modifying the amino acid L-phenylalanine. L-Phenylalanine would be decarboxylated and subsequently attacked with ω-aminoacetophenone. Methylation of this product would then produce ephedrine. This pathway has since been disproven. A new pathway proposed suggests that phenylalanine first forms cinnamoyl-CoA via the enzymes phenylalanine ammonia-lyase and acyl CoA ligase. The cinnamoyl-CoA is then reacted with a hydratase to attach the alcohol functional group. The product is then reacted with a retro-aldolase, forming benzaldehyde. Benzaldehyde reacts with pyruvic acid to attach a 2-carbon unit. This product then undergoes transamination and methylation to form ephedrine and its stereoisomer, pseudoephedrine.
