= L-Norpseudoephedrine =

Chemical compound

Clinical data
- ATC code: None

Identifiers
- IUPAC name: (1R,2R)-2-amino-1-phenyl-1-propanol
- CAS Number: 37577-07-4
- PubChem CID: 162265
- ChemSpider: 142493
- UNII: QQ0FVC4PXS
- CompTox Dashboard (EPA): DTXSID001045718 DTXSID20889399, DTXSID001045718
- ECHA InfoCard: 100.164.234

Chemical and physical data
- Formula: C_{9}H_{13}NO
- Molar mass: 151.209 g·mol^{−1}
- 3D model (JSmol): Interactive image
- SMILES: O[C@H](c1ccccc1)[C@H](N)C
- InChI: InChI=1S/C9H13NO/c1-7(10)9(11)8-5-3-2-4-6-8/h2-7,9,11H,10H2,1H3/t7-,9+/m1/s1; Key:DLNKOYKMWOXYQA-APPZFPTMSA-N

L-Norpseudoephedrine, or (−)-norpseudoephedrine, less commonly known as (–)-cathine or L-cathine, is a psychostimulant drug of the amphetamine family. It is the levorotary isomer of Norpseudoephedrine and is one of the 4 optical isomers of phenylpropanolamine ((−)-norpseudoephedrine, (+)-norpseudoephedrine, (−)-norephedrine, & (+)-norephedrine).

L-Norpseudoephedrine is an alkaloid of Ephedra sinica, Ephedra equisetina, and Catha edulis (khat). In khat, L-norpseudoephedrine is a secondary alkaloid present alongside cathinone. It is likely responsible for some of the milder stimulant effects of the plant, while cathinone produces the stronger psychoactive effects. In the Ephedra genus, L-norpseudoephedrine is a trace alkaloid compared to the more abundant alkaloids ephedrine and pseudoephedrine. Unlike in khat, L-Norpseudoephedrine does not contribute significantly to the pharmacological actions of Ephedra, as the amount contained in stems/leaves is negligible.

== Pharmacology ==
L-Norpseudoephedrine is a modestly selective or preferential norepinephrine releasing agent, similarly to other related compounds like ephedrine and pseudoephedrine. It acts as a releasing agent of norepinephrine (EC_{50} = 30 nM) and to a lesser extent of dopamine (EC_{50} = 294 nM).

L-Norpseudoephedrine is not classified as a norepinephrine–dopamine releasing agent because of its minimal dopaminergic action and the peripheral predominance of its sympathomimetic effects.

== Legal Status ==
In Germany, norpseudoephedrine is used as an alternate name to cathine, a derivative of cathinone, and is only available by prescription.

== See also ==
- Cathine
- Phenylpropanolamine
- Cathinone
- Pseudoephedrine
- Ephedrine
