= Cathinone =

Chemical compound

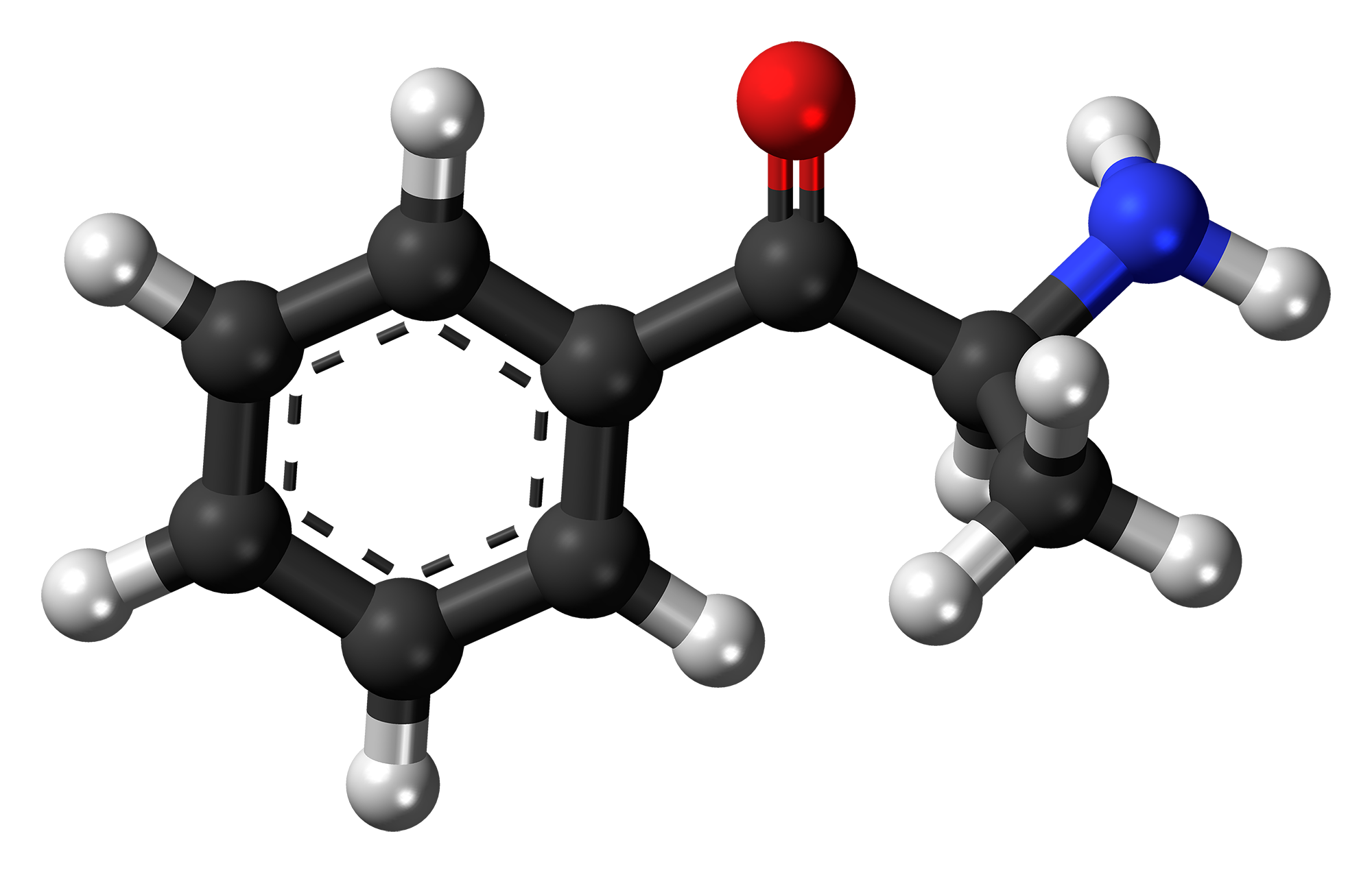

Clinical data
- Other names: β-Ketoamphetamine; Benzoylethanamine
- Dependence liability: Physical: no data Psychological: Low–moderate
- Drug class: Norepinephrine-dopamine releasing agent; Serotonin-norepinephrine reuptake inhibitor; Stimulant; Euphoriant
- ATC code: none

Legal status
- Legal status: AU: S9 (Prohibited substance); BR: Class F2 (Prohibited psychotropics); CA: Schedule III; DE: Anlage I (Authorized scientific use only); UK: Class C; US: Schedule I; UN: Psychotropic Schedule I; SE: Förteckning I

Pharmacokinetic data
- Metabolism: Liver
- Metabolites: Norephedrine, L-Norpseudoephedrine
- Elimination half-life: 0.7–2.3 h

Identifiers
- IUPAC name: (S)-2-Amino-1-phenylpropan-1-one
- CAS Number: 71031-15-7
- PubChem CID: 62258
- DrugBank: DB01560
- ChemSpider: 56062
- UNII: 540EI4406J
- KEGG: C08301
- ChEBI: CHEBI:4110
- ChEMBL: ChEMBL2104047
- CompTox Dashboard (EPA): DTXSID0050427
- ECHA InfoCard: 100.163.927

Chemical and physical data
- Formula: C_{9}H_{11}NO
- Molar mass: 149.193 g·mol^{−1}
- 3D model (JSmol): Interactive image
- SMILES: O=C(c1ccccc1)[C@@H](N)C
- InChI: InChI=1S/C9H11NO/c1-7(10)9(11)8-5-3-2-4-6-8/h2-7H,10H2,1H3/t7-/m0/s1; Key:PUAQLLVFLMYYJJ-ZETCQYMHSA-N

Cathinone (/ˈkæθɪnoʊn/; also known as β-ketoamphetamine) is a monoamine alkaloid found in the shrub Catha edulis (khat) and is chemically similar to ephedrine, cathine, methcathinone and other amphetamines. It is probably the main contributor to the stimulant effect of khat. Cathinone differs from many other amphetamines in that it has a ketone functional group. Other phenethylamines that share this structure include the stimulants methcathinone, MDPV, mephedrone and the antidepressant bupropion.

== History ==
=== Discovery ===
Khat has been cultivated in the Horn of Africa and Arabian Peninsula region of the world for thousands of years. It is most commonly chewed for the euphoric effect it produces. The active ingredient was first proposed in 1930, when cathine was identified as a predominant alkaloid in the plant. Cathine was thought to be the main active ingredient in khat until the 1960s, when it was found that the amount of cathine in the khat leaves is insufficient to produce the effects observed. In 1975, the United Nations Narcotic Laboratory analyzed khat leaves from Yemen, Kenya and Madagascar and found evidence of a different alkaloid, cathinone. Cathinone is molecularly similar to cathine, but is much more abundant in younger plants. This finding caused scientists to speculate that cathinone was the true active ingredient in khat.

A study was conducted in 1994 to test the effects of cathinone. Six volunteers who had never chewed khat were given an active khat sample and a cathinone-free placebo sample. The researchers analyzed the participants' moods, activity levels and blood pressure before and after consuming the khat or placebo. This analysis showed that cathinone produced amphetamine-like effects, leading the researchers to confirm that cathinone, not cathine, is the active ingredient in khat leaves.

=== Cultural significance ===
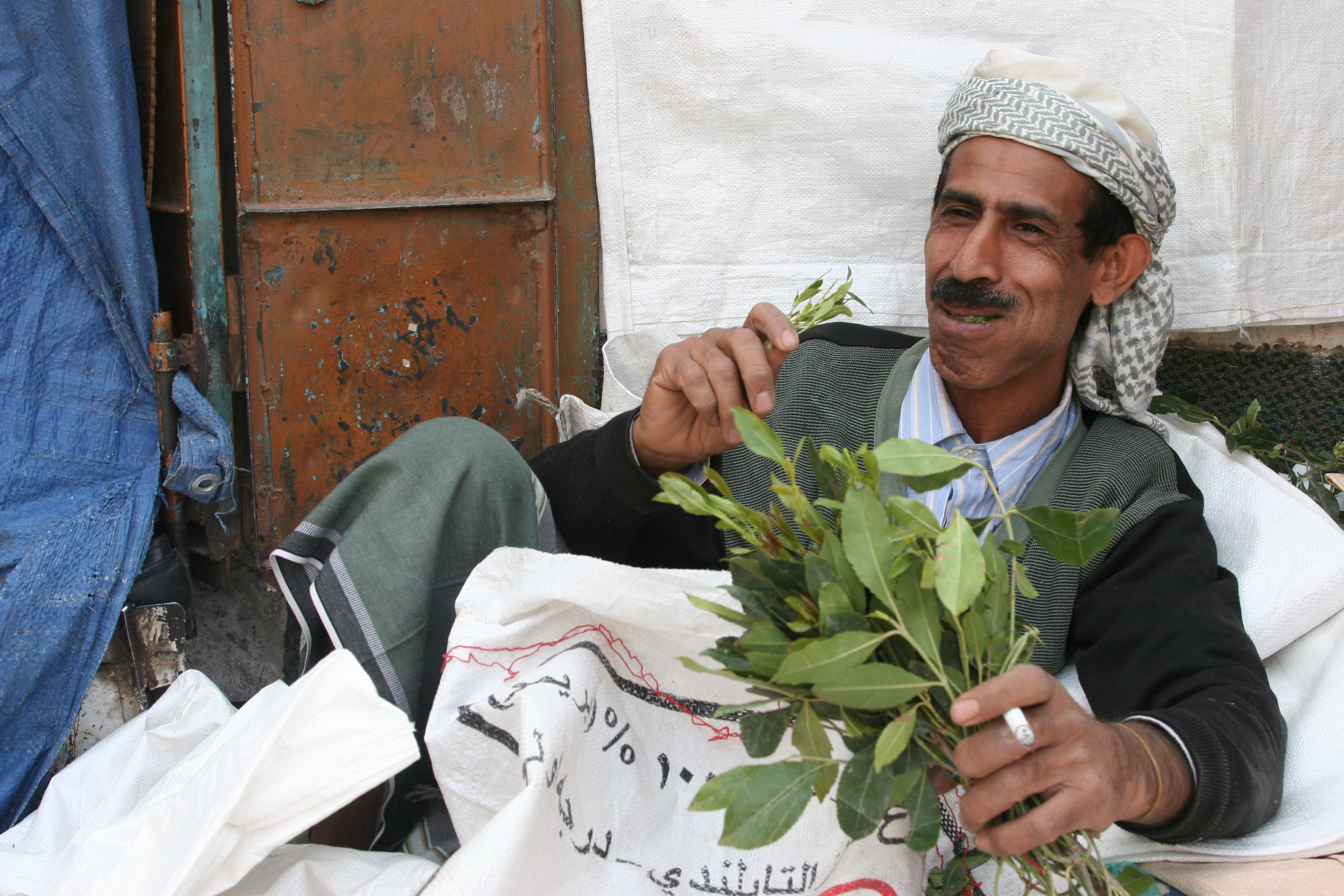
Man chewing khat

Over 20 million people in the Arabian Peninsula and East Africa chew khat leaves daily. It is an important piece of the culture and economy in this region, especially in Ethiopia (where khat is said to have originated), Kenya, Djibouti, Somalia and Yemen. Men usually chew it during parties or other social gatherings while smoking cigarettes and drinking tea. Farmers and other workers also use khat in the afternoon to reduce fatigue and hunger as the day goes on. It functions like the caffeine in a strong cup of coffee as an anti-fatigue drug. Students and drivers have been known to use it to stay alert for longer periods of time.

In order to produce its desired effects, khat leaves should be chewed fresh. The fresh leaves have a higher concentration of cathinone. Waiting too long after cultivation to chew the leaf will allow the cathinone to break down into its less potent form, cathine. Because of the need for quick chewing, it is a habit that has historically been prevalent only where the plant grows. However, in the recent years with improvements in road and air transport, khat chewing has spread to all corners of the world.

The cultivation of khat in Yemen is a highly profitable industry for farmers. Khat plants will grow differently depending on the climate they are grown in and each one will produce different amounts of cathinone. It generally grows best in coastal, hot climates. In Yemen, the khat plant is named after the region in which it is grown. The Nehmi khat plant has the highest known concentration of cathinone, 342.5 mg/100 g.

=== Legality ===
Internationally, cathinone is a Schedule I drug under the Convention on Psychotropic Substances. Circa 1993, the DEA added cathinone to the Controlled Substances Act's Schedule I.

The sale of khat is legal in some jurisdictions, but illegal in others (see Khat (Regulation)). Substituted cathinones were also often used as the key ingredient of recreational drug mixes commonly known as "bath salts" in the United States.

The table below shows the legality of khat and cathinone in various countries:

Region	Regulation
Eritrea	Legal
Ethiopia	Legal
Somalia	Legal
Djibouti	Legal
Kenya	Khat is legal but cathinone and cathine are classified as Class C substances
South Africa	Khat is a protected plant
China	Illegal
Israel	Legal – The khat plant leaves are allowed to be chewed and beverages containing khat are legal, but it is illegal to sell pills based on cathinone extracts
Malaysia	Illegal
Saudi Arabia	Illegal
Yemen	Khat is legal but the cultivation and selling of the plant is regulated by the government
Denmark	Illegal
Finland	Illegal
France	Khat is prohibited as a stimulant
Germany	Khat is illegal but a derivative of cathinone is available upon prescription
Ireland	Illegal unless authorized
Netherlands	Cathinone and cathine have been illegal but khat was announced as illegal in 2012
Norway	Illegal
Poland	Illegal
Sweden	Illegal
Switzerland	Illegal
United Kingdom	Illegal
Canada	Illegal to obtain unless approved by a medical practitioner
United States	Illegal
Australia	Illegal
New Zealand	Illegal
Georgia	The khat plant itself is allowed to be sold and chewed, but it is illegal to sell or make beverages containing khat
Turkey	Illegal
Bulgaria	Illegal under List I - "Plants and substances with a high risk to the public health due to their harmful effect of misuse, prohibited for use in human and veterinary medicine"

== Pharmacology ==
=== Pharmacodynamics ===
Monoamine release of cathinone and related agents (EC_{50}, nM)
Compound	NE	DA	5-HT	Ref
Phenethylamine	10.9	39.5	>10,000	
Amphetamine	ND	ND	ND	ND
Dextroamphetamine	6.6–7.2	5.8–24.8	698–1,765	
Levoamphetamine	9.5	27.7	ND	
Methamphetamine	ND	ND	ND	ND
Dextromethamphetamine	12.3–13.8	8.5–24.5	736–1,292	
Levomethamphetamine	28.5	416	4,640	
Cathinone	23.6–25.6	34.8–83.1	6,100–7,595	
D-Cathinone	72.0	184	>10,000	
L-Cathinone	12.4–28	18–24.6	2,366–9,267	
Methcathinone	22–26.1	12.5–49.9	2,592–5,853	
D-Methcathinone	ND	ND	IA	
L-Methcathinone	13.1	14.8	1,772	
Cathine	15.0	68.3	>10,000	
Notes: The smaller the value, the more strongly the drug releases the neurotransmitter. The assays were done in rat brain synaptosomes and human potencies may be different. See also Monoamine releasing agent § Activity profiles for a larger table with more compounds. Refs:

Cathinone has been found to stimulate the release of dopamine and inhibit the reuptake of epinephrine, norepinephrine and serotonin in the central nervous system (CNS). These neurotransmitters are all considered monoamines and share the general structure of an aromatic ring and an amine group attached by a two-carbon separator. Because cathinone is a hydrophobic molecule, it can easily cross cell membranes and other barriers, including the blood–brain barrier. This property allows it to interact with the monoamine transporters in the synaptic cleft between neurons. Cathinone induces the release of dopamine from brain striatal preparations that are prelabelled either with dopamine or its precursors. It is more specifically a norepinephrine–dopamine releasing agent (NDRA) similarly to amphetamine.

The metabolites of cathinone, cathine and norephedrine, also possess CNS stimulation, but create much weaker effects. The effects of cathinone on the body can be countered by a preceding administration of a dopamine receptor antagonist. The antagonist prevents synaptic dopamine released by cathinone from exerting its effect by binding to dopamine receptors.

Cathinone can also affect cholinergic concentrations in the gut and airways by blocking prejunctional adrenergic receptors (α_{2} adrenergic) and activating 5-HT7 receptors, thereby inhibiting smooth muscle contraction. It can also induce dry mouth, blurred vision and increased blood pressure and heart rate.

Cathinone is a weak agonist of the mouse, rat, and human trace amine-associated receptor 1 (TAAR1). In contrast to cathinone however, most other cathinones are not human TAAR1 agonists. TAAR1 activation may auto-inhibit and constrain the monoaminergic effects of monoamine releasing agents possessing TAAR1 agonism.

=== Pharmacokinetics ===
Khat leaves are removed from the plant stalk and are kept in a ball in the cheek and chewed. Chewing releases juices from the leaves, which include the alkaloid cathinone. The absorption of cathinone has two phases: one in the buccal mucosa and one in the stomach and small intestine. The stomach and small intestine are very important in the absorption of ingested alkaloids. At approximately 2.3 hours after chewing khat leaves, the maximum concentration of cathinone in blood plasma is reached. The mean residence time is 5.2 ± 3.4 hours. The elimination half-life of cathinone is 1.5 ± 0.8 hours. A two-compartment model for absorption and elimination best describes this data. However, at most, only 7% of the ingested cathinone is recovered in the urine. This indicates that the cathinone is being broken down in the body. Cathinone has been shown to selectively metabolize into R,S-(-)-norephedrine and cathine. The reduction of the ketone group in cathinone will produce cathine. This reduction is catalyzed by enzymes in the liver. The spontaneous breakdown of cathinone is the reason it must be chewed fresh after cultivation.

=== Effects on health ===
The first documentation of the khat plant being used in medicine was in a book published by an Arabian physician in the 10th century. It was used as an antidepressant because it led to feelings of happiness and excitement. Chronic khat chewing can also create drug dependence, as shown by animal studies. In such studies, monkeys were trained to push a lever to receive the drug reward. As the monkeys' dependence increased, they pressed the lever at an increasing frequency.

Khat chewing and the effects of cathinone on the body differ from person to person, but there is a general pattern of behavior that emerges after ingesting fresh cathinone:

1. Feelings of euphoria that last for one to two hours
2. Discussion of serious issues and increased irritability
3. Very active imagination
4. Depression
5. Irritability, loss of appetite and insomnia

There are other effects not related to the CNS. The chewer can develop constipation and heartburn after a khat session. Long-term effects of cathinone can include gum disease or oral cancer, cardiovascular disease and depression. The withdrawal symptoms of cathinone include hot flashes, lethargy and a great urge to use the drug for at least the first two days.

== Chemistry ==
=== Biosynthesis ===
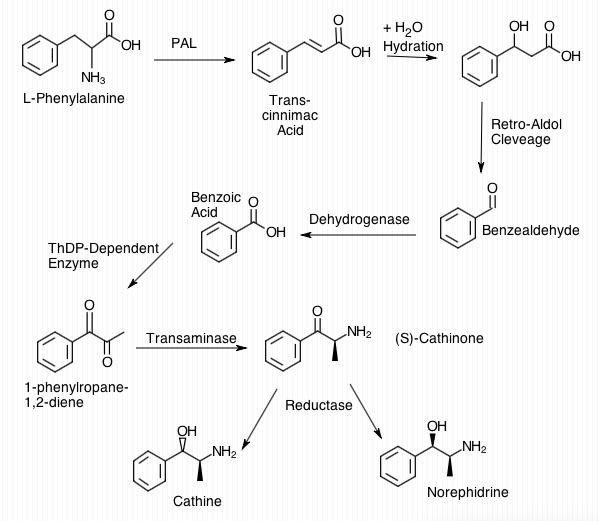
Mechanism of the Non-Beta Oxidation pathway for the biosynthesis of S-Cathinone in the Khat plant

The synthesis of cathinone in khat begins with L-phenylalanine and the first step is carried out by L-phenylalanine ammonia lyase (PAL), which cleaves off an ammonia group and creates a carbon-carbon double bond, forming cinnamic acid. After this, the molecule can either go through a beta-oxidative pathway or a non-beta-oxidative pathway. The beta-oxidative pathway produces benzoyl-CoA while the non-beta-oxidative pathway produces benzoic acid. Both of these molecules can be converted to 1-phenylpropane-1,2-dione by a condensation reaction catalyzed by a ThDP-dependent enzyme (Thiamine diphosphate-dependent enzyme) with pyruvate and producing CO_{2}. 1-phenylpropane-1,2-dione goes through a transaminase reaction to replace a ketone with an ammonia group to form (S)-cathinone. (S)-Cathinone can then undergo a reduction reaction to produce the less potent but structurally similar cathine or norephedrine, which are also found in the plant.

Aside from the beta- and non-beta-oxidative pathways, the biosynthesis of cathinone can proceed through a CoA-dependent pathway. The CoA-dependent pathway is actually a mix between the two main pathways as it starts like the beta-oxidative pathway and then when it loses CoA, it finishes the synthesis in the non-beta-oxidative pathway. In this pathway, the trans-cinnamic acid produced from L-phenylalanine is ligated to a Coenzyme A (CoA), just like the beginning of the beta-oxidative pathway. It then undergoes hydration at the double bond. This product then loses the CoA to produce benzaldehyde, an intermediate of the non-beta-oxidative pathway. Benzaldehyde is converted into benzoic acid and proceeds through the rest of the synthesis.

=== Synthetic production ===
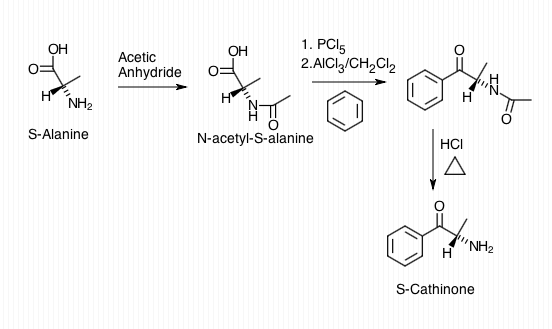
Synthesize enantiomerically pure S-Cathinone

Racemic cathinone from propiophenone via the α-brominated intermediate

Two mechanism of synthesizing Cathinone

Cathinone can be synthetically produced from propiophenone through a Friedel-Crafts acylation of propionic acid and benzene. The resulting propiophenone can be brominated, and the bromine can be substituted with ammonia to produce a racemic mixture of cathinone. A different synthetic strategy must be employed to produce enantiomerically pure (S)-cathinone. This synthetic route starts out with the N-acetylation of the optically active amino acid, S-alanine. Then, phosphorus pentachloride (PCl_{5}) is used to chlorinate the carboxylic acid forming an acyl chloride. At the same time, a Friedel-Crafts acylation is preformed on benzene with aluminum chloride catalyst. Finally, the acetyl protecting group is removed by heating with hydrochloric acid to form enantiomerically pure S-(-)-cathinone.

=== Structure ===
Chemical structure of bupropion, a cathinone derivative

Cathinone can be extracted from Catha edulis (khat), or synthesized from α-bromopropiophenone (which is easily made from propiophenone). Because cathinone is both a primary amine and a ketone, it is very prone to dimerization, especially as a free base isolated from plant matter. These dimers are pharmacologically inactive, and the rapid dimerization reduces active amounts of cathinone in non-fresh khat. The rapid formation of dimers also applies to other non-N-substituted cathinones such as methylenedioxycathinone (MDC; normethylone).

The structure of cathinone is very similar to that of other molecules. By reducing the ketone, it becomes cathine if it retains its stereochemistry, or norephedrine if its stereochemistry is inverted. Cathine is a less potent version of cathinone and cathinone's spontaneous reduction is the reason that older khat plants are not as stimulating as younger ones. Cathinone and amphetamine are closely related in that amphetamine is only lacking the ketone C=O group. Cathinone is structurally related to methcathinone, in much the same way as amphetamine is related to methamphetamine. Cathinone differs from amphetamine by possessing a ketone oxygen atom (C=O) on the β (beta) position of the side chain. Advancements in synthesizing cyclic cathinones based on α-tetralone have employed chiral HPLC-CD techniques to determine the absolute configuration of enantiomers, an approach that may contribute to the development of pharmaceutical analogs with antidepressant potential. The corresponding substance cathine, is a less powerful stimulant. The biophysiological conversion from cathinone to cathine is to blame for the depotentiation of khat leaves over time. Fresh leaves have a greater ratio of cathinone to cathine than dried ones, therefore having more psychoactive effects.

There are many cathinone derivatives that include the addition of an R group to the amino end of the molecule. Some of these derivatives have medical uses as well. Bupropion is one of the most commonly prescribed antidepressants and its structure is Cathinone with a tertiary butyl group attached to the nitrogen and chlorine attached to the benzene ring meta- to the main carbon chain.

Other cathinone derivatives are strong psychoactive drugs. One such drug is methylone, a drug structurally similar to MDMA.

== See also ==
- Bupropion
- Central nervous system
- Khat
- Substituted cathinone
