= Phenylpropanolamine =

Sympathomimetic agent

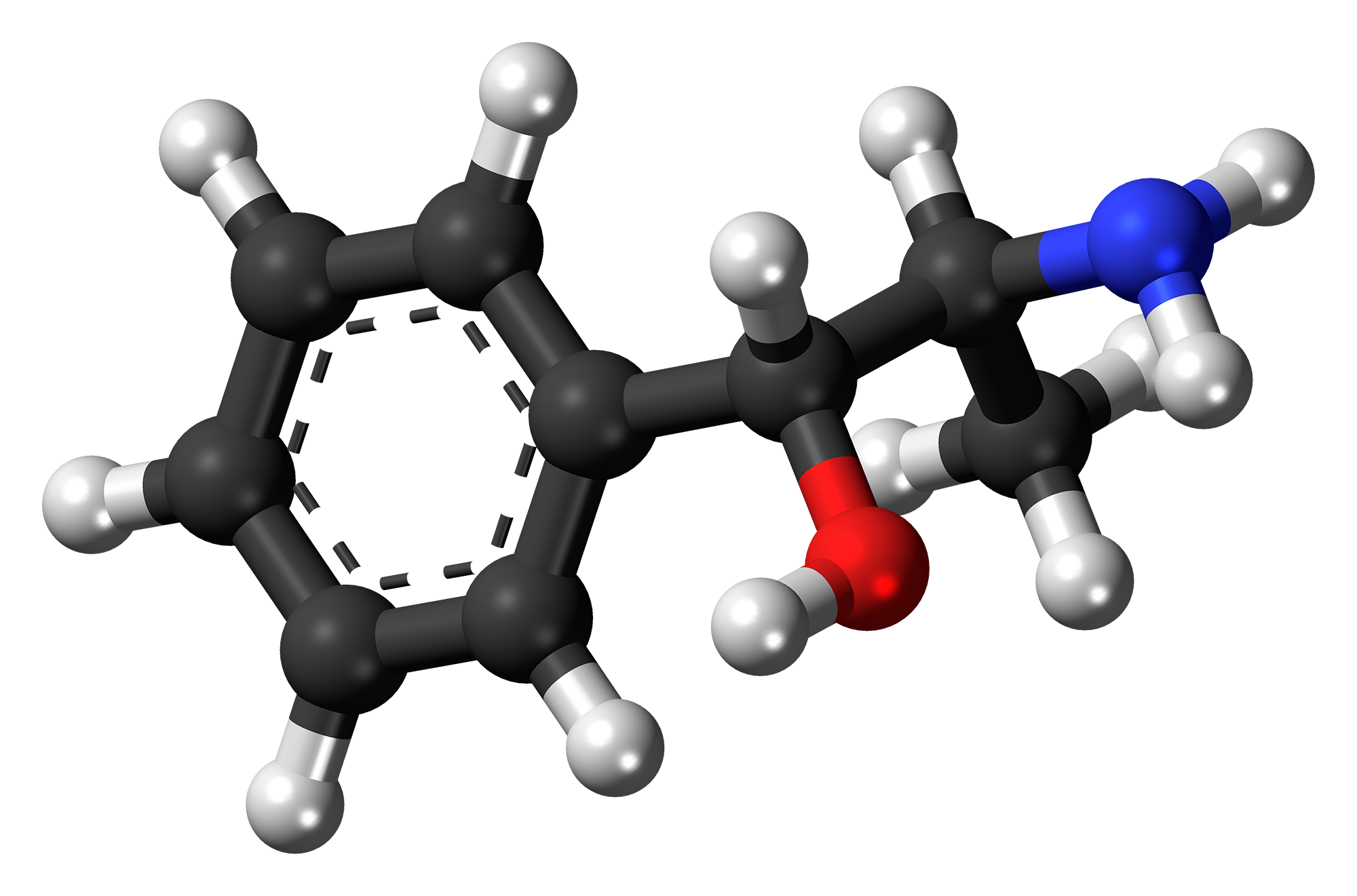

Clinical data
- Other names: PPA; Norephedrine; (1RS,2SR)-Phenylpropanolamine; dl-Norephedrine; (±)-Norephedrine; (1RS,2SR)-α-Methyl-β-hydroxyphenethylamine; (1RS,2SR)-β-Hydroxyamphetamine
- AHFS/Drugs.com: Multum Consumer Information
- Pregnancy category: AU: B2
- Routes of administration: By mouth
- Drug class: Nasal decongestant; Anorectic; Norepinephrine releasing agent
- ATC code: R01BA01 (WHO) QG04BX91 (WHO)

Legal status
- Legal status: AU: S4 (Prescription only); BR: Class F3 (Prohibited drug precursors); CA: Schedule VI; US: ℞-only

Pharmacokinetic data
- Bioavailability: High
- Protein binding: 20%
- Metabolism: Minimal (3–4%)
- Metabolites: • Hippuric acid (~4%) • 4-Hydroxynorephedrine (≤1%)
- Onset of action: Oral: 15–30 minutes
- Elimination half-life: 4 hours (range 3.7–4.9 hours)
- Duration of action: Oral: 3 hours
- Excretion: Urine: 90% (unchanged)

Identifiers
- IUPAC name: (1RS,2SR)-2-amino-1-phenylpropan-1-ol
- CAS Number: 14838-15-4
- PubChem CID: 4786
- DrugBank: DB00397
- ChemSpider: 9875
- UNII: 33RU150WUN
- KEGG: D08368
- ChEMBL: ChEMBL136560
- CompTox Dashboard (EPA): DTXSID70859305 DTXSID4023466, DTXSID70859305
- ECHA InfoCard: 100.035.349

Chemical and physical data
- Formula: C_{9}H_{13}NO
- Molar mass: 151.209 g·mol^{−1}
- 3D model (JSmol): Interactive image
- SMILES: O[C@H](c1ccccc1)[C@@H](N)C
- InChI: InChI=1S/C9H13NO/c1-7(10)9(11)8-5-3-2-4-6-8/h2-7,9,11H,10H2,1H3/t7-,9-/m0/s1; Key:DLNKOYKMWOXYQA-CBAPKCEASA-N

Phenylpropanolamine (PPA) is a sympathomimetic agent used as a decongestant and appetite suppressant. It was once common in prescription and over-the-counter cough and cold preparations. The medication is taken orally.

Side effects of phenylpropanolamine include increased heart rate and blood pressure. Rarely, PPA has been associated with hemorrhagic stroke. PPA acts as a norepinephrine releasing agent, indirectly activating adrenergic receptors. As such, it is an indirectly acting sympathomimetic. It was once thought to act as a sympathomimetic with additional direct agonist action on adrenergic receptors, but this proved wrong. Chemically, phenylpropanolamine is a substituted amphetamine and is closely related to ephedrine, pseudoephedrine, amphetamine, and cathinone. It is usually a racemic mixture of the (1R,2S)- and (1S,2R)-enantiomers of β-hydroxyamphetamine and is also known as dl-norephedrine.

Phenylpropanolamine was first synthesized around 1910 and its effects on blood pressure were characterized around 1930. It was introduced as medicine by the 1930s. It was withdrawn from many markets starting in 2000 after learning that it was associated with increased risk of hemorrhagic stroke. It was previously available both over-the-counter and by prescription. Phenylpropanolamine is available for both human and/or veterinary use in some countries.

== Medical uses ==
Phenylpropanolamine is used as a decongestant to treat nasal congestion. It has also been used to suppress appetite and promote weight loss in the treatment of obesity and has shown effectiveness for this indication.

=== Available forms ===
Phenylpropanolamine was previously available in the United States over-the-counter and in certain combination drug forms by prescription. One such example of the latter was a combination of phenylpropanolamine and chlorpheniramine, which dually contained decongestant and antihistamine effects, marketed by Tutag as 'Vernate'. These forms have all been discontinued in the U.S., although phenylpropanolamine remains available in some countries.

== Side effects ==
Phenylpropanolamine produces sympathomimetic effects and can cause side effects such as increased heart rate and blood pressure. It has been associated rarely with incidence of hemorrhagic stroke.

Certain drugs increase the chances of déjà vu occurring in the user, resulting in a strong sensation that an event or experience currently being experienced has already been experienced in the past. Some pharmaceutical drugs, when taken together, have also been implicated in the cause of déjà vu. The Journal of Clinical Neuroscience reported the case of an otherwise healthy male who started experiencing intense and recurrent sensations of déjà vu upon taking the drugs amantadine and phenylpropanolamine together to relieve flu symptoms. He found the experience so interesting that he completed the full course of his treatment and reported it to the psychologists to write up as a case study. Because of the dopaminergic action of the drugs and previous findings from electrode stimulation of the brain, it was speculated that déjà vu occurs as a result of hyperdopaminergic action in the mesial temporal areas of the brain.

== Interactions ==
There has been very little research on drug interactions with phenylpropanolamine. In one study, phenylpropanolamine taken with caffeine was found to quadruple caffeine levels. In another study, phenylpropanolamine reduced theophylline clearance by 50%.

== Pharmacology ==
=== Pharmacodynamics ===
Phenylpropanolamine acts primarily as a selective norepinephrine releasing agent. It also acts as a dopamine releasing agent with around 10-fold lower potency. The stereoisomers of the drug have only weak or negligible affinity for α- and β-adrenergic receptors.

Monoamine release by phenylpropanolamine and related agents (EC_{50}, nM)
Compound	NE	DA	5-HT	Ref
Dextroamphetamine (S(+)-amphetamine)	6.6–7.2	5.8–24.8	698–1,765	
S(–)-Cathinone	12.4	18.5	2,366	
Ephedrine ((–)-ephedrine)	43.1–72.4	236–1,350	>10,000	
(+)-Ephedrine	218	2,104	>10,000	
Dextromethamphetamine (S(+)-methamphetamine)	12.3–13.8	8.5–24.5	736–1,292	
Levomethamphetamine (R(–)-methamphetamine)	28.5	416	4,640	
(+)-Phenylpropanolamine ((+)-norephedrine)	42.1	302	>10,000	
(–)-Phenylpropanolamine ((–)-norephedrine)	137	1,371	>10,000	
Cathine ((+)-norpseudoephedrine)	15.0	68.3	>10,000	
(–)-Norpseudoephedrine	30.1	294	>10,000	
(–)-Pseudoephedrine	4,092	9,125	>10,000	
Pseudoephedrine ((+)-pseudoephedrine)	224	1,988	>10,000	
Notes: The smaller the value, the more strongly the drug releases the neurotransmitter. The assays were done in rat brain synaptosomes and human potencies may be different. See also Monoamine releasing agent § Activity profiles for a larger table with more compounds. Refs:

Phenylpropanolamine was originally thought to act as a direct agonist of adrenergic receptors and hence to act as a mixed acting sympathomimetic, However, phenylpropanolamine was subsequently found to show only weak or negligible affinity for these receptors and has been instead characterized as exclusively an indirectly acting sympathomimetic. It acts by inducing norepinephrine release and thereby indirectly activating adrenergic receptors.

Many sympathetic hormones and neurotransmitters are based on the phenethylamine skeleton, and function generally in "fight or flight" type responses, such as increasing heart rate, blood pressure, dilating the pupils, increased energy, drying of mucous membranes, increased sweating, and a significant number of additional effects.

Phenylpropanolamine has relatively low potency as a sympathomimetic. It is about 100 to 200 times less potent than epinephrine (adrenaline) or norepinephrine (noradrenaline) in its sympathomimetic effects, although responses are variable depending on tissue.

=== Pharmacokinetics ===
==== Absorption ====
Phenylpropanolamine is readily- and well-absorbed with oral administration. Immediate-release forms of the drug reached peak levels about 1.5 hours (range 1.0 to 2.3 hours) following administration. Conversely, extended-release forms of phenylpropanolamine reach peak levels after 3.0 to 4.5 hours. The pharmacokinetics of phenylpropanolamine are linear across an oral dose range of 25 to 100 mg. Steady-state levels of phenylpropanolamine are achieved within 12 hours when the drug is taken once every 4 hours. There is 62% accumulation of phenylpropanolamine at steady state in terms of peak levels, whereas area-under-the-curve levels are not increased with steady state.

==== Distribution ====
The volume of distribution of phenylpropanolamine is 3.0 to 4.5 L/kg. Levels of phenylpropanolamine in the brain are about 40% of those in the heart and 20% of those in the lungs. The hydroxyl group of phenylpropanolamine at the β carbon increases its hydrophilicity, reduces its permeation through the blood–brain barrier, and limits its central nervous system (CNS) effects. Hence, phenylpropanolamine crosses into the brain only to some extent, has only weak CNS effects, and most of its effects are peripheral. In any case, phenylpropanolamine can produce amphetamine-like psychostimulant effects at very high doses. Phenylpropanolamine is more lipophilic than structurally related sympathomimetics with hydroxyl groups on the phenyl ring like epinephrine (adrenaline) and phenylephrine and has greater brain permeability than these agents.

The plasma protein binding of phenylpropanolamine is approximately 20%. However, it has been said that no recent studies have substantiated this value.

==== Metabolism ====
Phenylpropanolamine is not substantially metabolized. It also does not undergo significant first-pass metabolism. Only about 3 to 4% of an oral dose of phenylpropanolamine is metabolized. Metabolites include hippuric acid (via oxidative deamination of the side chain) and 4-hydroxynorephedrine (via para-hydroxylation). The methyl group at the α carbon of phenylpropanolamine blocks metabolism by monoamine oxidases (MAOs). Phenylpropanolamine is also not a substrate of catechol O-methyltransferase. The hydroxyl group at the β carbon of phenylpropanolamine also helps to increase metabolic stability.

==== Elimination ====
Approximately 90% of a dose of phenylpropanolamine is excreted in the urine unchanged within 24 hours. About 4% of excreted material is in the form of metabolites.

The elimination half-life of immediate-release phenylpropanolamine is about 4 hours, with a range in different studies of 3.7 to 4.9 hours. The half-life of extended-release phenylpropanolamine has ranged from 4.3 to 5.8 hours.

The elimination of phenylpropanolamine is dependent on urinary pH. At a more acidic urinary pH, the elimination of phenylpropanolamine is accelerated and its half-life and duration are shortened, whereas at more basic urinary pH, the elimination of phenylpropanolamine is reduced and its half-life and duration are extended. Urinary acidifying agents like ascorbic acid and ammonium chloride can increase the excretion of and thereby reduce exposure to amphetamines including phenylpropanolamine, whereas urinary alkalinizing agents including antacids like sodium bicarbonate as well as acetazolamide can reduce the excretion of these agents and thereby increase exposure to them.

Total body clearance of phenylpropanolamine has been reported to be 0.546 L/h/kg, while renal clearance was 0.432 L/h/kg.

==== Miscellaneous ====
As phenylpropanolamine is not extensively metabolized, it would probably not be affected by hepatic impairment. Conversely, there is likely to be accumulation of phenylpropanolamine with renal impairment due to its dependence on urinary excretion.

Norephedrine is a minor metabolite of amphetamine and methamphetamine, as shown below. It is also a minor metabolite of ephedrine and a major metabolite of cathinone.

Metabolic pathways of amphetamine in humans
In humans, norephedrine occurs as a metabolite of amphetamine. The β-hydroxylation of amphetamine is mediated by dopamine β-hydroxylase.

== Chemistry ==
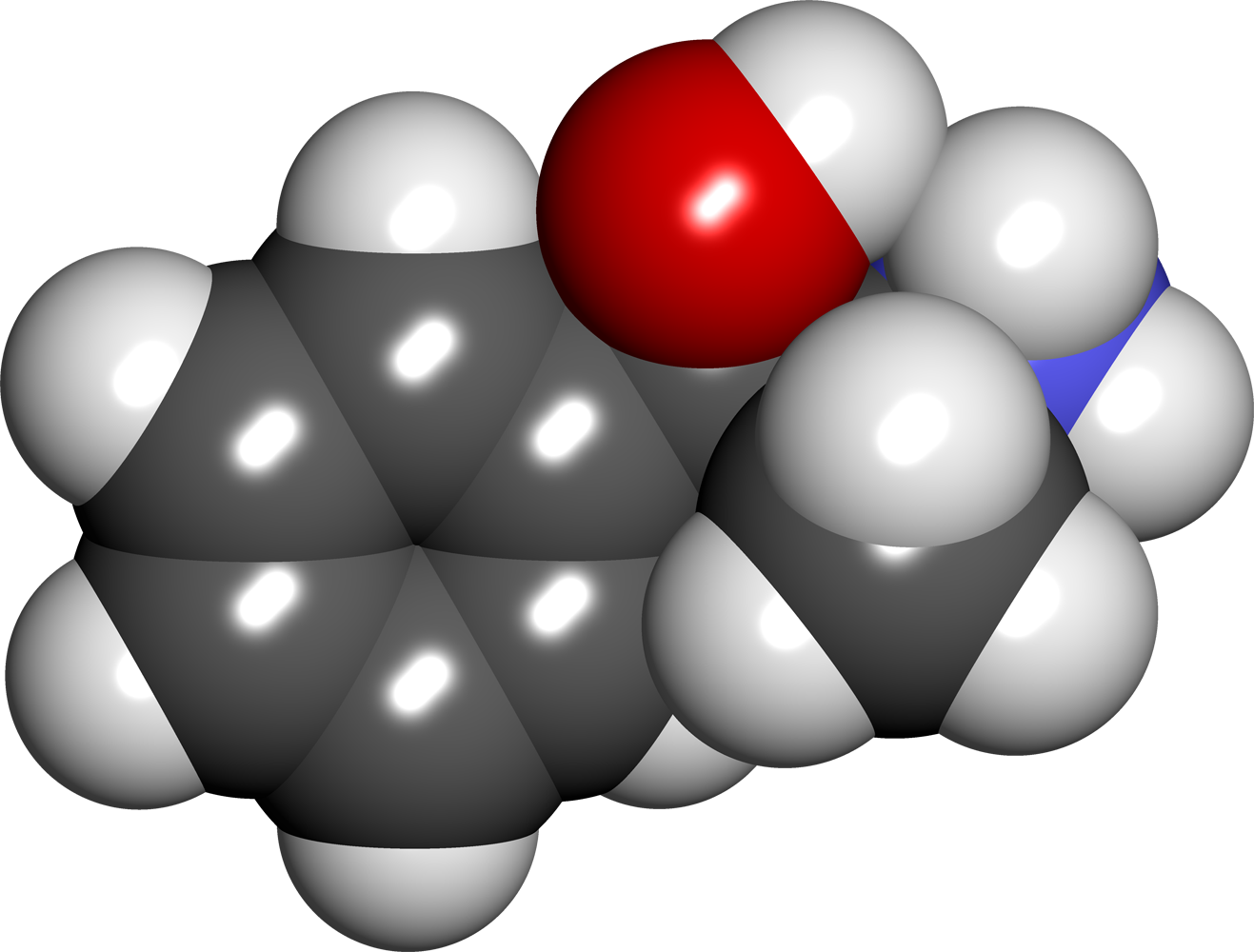
Space-filling model of phenylpropanolamine.

Phenylpropanolamine, also known as (1RS,2SR)-α-methyl-β-hydroxyphenethylamine or as (1RS,2SR)-β-hydroxyamphetamine, is a substituted phenethylamine and amphetamine derivative. It is closely related to the cathinones (β-ketoamphetamines). β-Hydroxyamphetamine exists as four stereoisomers, which include d- (dextrorotatory) and l-norephedrine (levorotatory), and d- and l-norpseudoephedrine. d-Norpseudoephedrine is also known as cathine, and is found naturally in Catha edulis (khat). Pharmaceutical drug preparations of phenylpropanolamine have varied in their stereoisomer composition in different countries, which may explain differences in misuse and side effect profiles. In any case, racemic dl-norephedrine, or (1RS,2SR)-phenylpropanolamine, appears to be the most commonly used formulation of phenylpropanolamine pharmaceutically. Analogues of phenylpropanolamine include ephedrine, pseudoephedrine, amphetamine, methamphetamine, and cathinone.

Phenylpropanolamine, structurally, is in the substituted phenethylamine class, consisting of a cyclic benzene or phenyl group, a two carbon ethyl moiety, and a terminal nitrogen, hence the name phen-ethyl-amine. The methyl group on the alpha carbon (the first carbon before the nitrogen group) also makes this compound a member of the substituted amphetamine class. Ephedrine is the N-methyl analogue of phenylpropanolamine.

Exogenous compounds in this family are degraded too rapidly by monoamine oxidase to be active at all but the highest doses. However, the addition of the α-methyl group allows the compound to avoid metabolism and confer an effect. In general, N-methylation of primary amines increases their potency, whereas β-hydroxylation decreases CNS activity, but conveys more selectivity for adrenergic receptors.

Phenylpropanolamine is a small-molecule compound with the molecular formula C_{9}H_{13}NO and a molecular weight of 151.21 g/mol. It has an experimental log P of 0.67, while its predicted log P values range from 0.57 to 0.89. The compound is relatively lipophilic, but is also more hydrophilic than other amphetamines. The lipophilicity of amphetamines is closely related to their brain permeability. For comparison to phenylpropanolamine, the experimental log P of methamphetamine is 2.1, of amphetamine is 1.8, of ephedrine is 1.1, of pseudoephedrine is 0.7, of phenylephrine is -0.3, and of norepinephrine is -1.2. Methamphetamine has high brain permeability, whereas phenylephrine and norepinephrine are peripherally selective drugs. The optimal log P for brain permeation and central activity is about 2.1 (range 1.5–2.7).

Phenylpropanolamine has been used pharmaceutically exclusively as the hydrochloride salt.

== History ==
Phenylpropanolamine was first synthesized in the early 20th century, in or around 1910. It was patented as a mydriatic in 1913. The pressor effects of phenylpropanolamine were characterized in the late 1920s and the 1930s. Phenylpropanolamine was first introduced for medical use by the 1930s.

In the United States, phenylpropanolamine is no longer sold due to an increased risk of haemorrhagic stroke. In a few countries in Europe, however, it is still available either by prescription or sometimes over-the-counter. In Canada, it was withdrawn from the market on 31 May 2001. It was voluntarily withdrawn from the Australian market by July 2001. In India, human use of phenylpropanolamine and its formulations was banned on 10 February 2011, but the ban was overturned by the judiciary in September 2011.

== Society and culture ==
=== Names ===
Phenylpropanolamine is the generic name of the drug and its INN, BAN, and DCF, while phenylpropanolamine hydrochloride is its USAN and BANM in the case of the hydrochloride salt. It is also known by the synonym norephedrine.

Brand names of phenylpropanolamine include Acutrim, Appedrine, Capton Diet, Control, Dexatrim, Emagrin Plus A.P., Glifentol, Kontexin, Merex, Monydrin, Mydriatine, Prolamine, Propadrine, Propagest, Recatol, Rinexin, Tinaroc, and Westrim, among many others. It has also been used in combinations under brand names including Allerest, Demazin, Dimetapp, and Sinarest, among others.

=== Availability ===
Phenylpropanolamine is available for medical and veterinary use in some countries.

=== Exercise and sports ===
There has been interest in phenylpropanolamine as a performance-enhancing drug in exercise and sports. However, clinical studies suggest that phenylpropanolamine is not effective in this regard. Phenylpropanolamine is not on the World Anti-Doping Agency (WADA) list of prohibited substances as of 2024.

=== Legal status ===
In Sweden, phenylpropanolamine is still available in prescription decongestants; Phenylpropanolamine is also still available in Germany. It is used in some polypill medications like Wick DayMed capsules.

In the United Kingdom, phenylpropanolamine was available in many "all in one" cough and cold medications which usually also feature paracetamol (also known as acetaminophen) or another analgesic and caffeine and could also be purchased on its own. It is no longer approved for human use, however, and a European Category 1 Licence is required to purchase or acquire phenylpropanolamine for academic or research use.

In the United States, the Food and Drug Administration (FDA) issued a public health advisory recommending against the use of the drug in November 2000. In this advisory, the FDA requested but did not require that all drug companies discontinue marketing products containing phenylpropanolamine. The agency estimates that phenylpropanolamine caused between 200 and 500 strokes per year among 18-to-49-year-old users. In 2005, the FDA removed phenylpropanolamine from over-the-counter sale and removed its "generally recognized as safe and effective" (GRASE) status. Under the 2020 CARES Act, it requires FDA approval before it can be marketed again, effectively banning the drug, even as a prescription.

Because of its potential use in amphetamine manufacture, phenylpropanolamine is controlled by the Combat Methamphetamine Epidemic Act of 2005. However, It is still available for veterinary use in dogs as a treatment for urinary incontinence.

Internationally, an item on the agenda of the 2000 Commission on Narcotic Drugs session called for including the stereoisomer norephedrine in Table I of United Nations Convention Against Illicit Traffic in Narcotic Drugs and Psychotropic Substances.

Drugs containing phenylpropanolamine were banned in India on 27 January 2011. On 13 September 2011, Madras High Court revoked a ban on the manufacture and sale of pediatric drugs phenylpropanolamine and nimesulide.

== Veterinary use ==
Phenylpropanolamine is available for use in veterinary medicine. It is used to control urinary incontinence in dogs.

In June 2024, the US Food and Drug Administration (FDA) approved Phenylpropanolamine hydrochloride chewable tablets for the control of urinary incontinence due to a weakening of the muscles that control urination (urethral sphincter hypotonus) in dogs. This is the first generic phenylpropanolamine hydrochloride chewable tablets for dogs.

Urinary incontinence happens when a dog loses its ability to control when it urinates. Urinary incontinence due to urethral sphincter hypotonus can happen as dogs age and as the dog's muscle in its urethra (the tube that leads from the dog's bladder to outside its body) weakens and loses control over its ability to hold urine.

Phenylpropanolamine hydrochloride chewable tablets contain the same active ingredient (phenylpropanolamine hydrochloride) in the same concentration and dosage form as the approved brand name drug product, Proin chewable tablets, which were first approved in August 2011. In addition, the FDA determined that Phenylpropanolamine hydrochloride chewable tablets contain no inactive ingredients that may significantly affect the bioavailability of the active ingredient.
