= Norpseudoephedrine =

Norpseudoephedrine may refer to:

- Cathine (or D-norpseudoephedrine), the (+)-enantiomer and most widely known form of the compound
- L-Norpseudoephedrine, the (-)-enantiomer of the compound
- (±)-norpseudoephedrine, the racemic mixture of the compound

== See also ==
- Pseudoephedrine
