= Cathine =

Chemical compound

Clinical data
- Other names: (+)-Norpseudoephedrine; Cathine; (1S,2S)-β-Hydroxyamphetamine
- Routes of administration: Oral
- Drug class: Appetite suppressant; CNS stimulant; Norepinephrine-dopamine releasing agent
- ATC code: A08AA07 (WHO)

Legal status
- Legal status: AU: S4 (Prescription only); BR: Class A3 (Psychoactive drugs); CA: Schedule IV; DE: Prescription only (Anlage III for higher doses); UK: Class C; US: Schedule IV; UN: Psychotropic Schedule III

Pharmacokinetic data
- Elimination half-life: 1.8–8.6 hours

Identifiers
- IUPAC name: (1S,2S)-2-amino-1-phenylpropan-1-ol
- CAS Number: 492-39-7
- PubChem CID: 441457
- DrugBank: DB01486
- ChemSpider: 390189
- UNII: E1L4ZW2F8O
- KEGG: D07627
- ChEBI: CHEBI:4109
- ChEMBL: ChEMBL1412041
- CompTox Dashboard (EPA): DTXSID50889347
- ECHA InfoCard: 100.007.050

Chemical and physical data
- Formula: C_{9}H_{13}NO
- Molar mass: 151.209 g·mol^{−1}
- 3D model (JSmol): Interactive image
- Solubility in water: 20 mg/mL (20 °C)
- SMILES: O[C@@H](c1ccccc1)[C@@H](N)C
- InChI: InChI=1S/C9H13NO/c1-7(10)9(11)8-5-3-2-4-6-8/h2-7,9,11H,10H2,1H3/t7-,9+/m0/s1; Key:DLNKOYKMWOXYQA-IONNQARKSA-N

Cathine, also known as D-norpseudoephedrine or as (+)-norpseudoephedrine, is a psychoactive drug of the phenethylamine and amphetamine groups which acts as a stimulant. Along with cathinone, it is found naturally in Catha edulis (khat), and contributes to the overall effects of the plant. Cathine has approximately 7 to 10% of the potency of amphetamine.

== Pharmacology ==
Like amphetamines, cathinone and ephedrine, cathine acts as a norepinephrine releasing agent (NRA). It also acts as a dopamine releasing agent (DRA).

Monoamine release by cathine and related agents (EC_{50}, nM)
Compound	NE	DA	5-HT	Ref
Dextroamphetamine (S(+)-amphetamine)	6.6–7.2	5.8–24.8	698–1,765	
S(–)-Cathinone	12.4	18.5	2,366	
Ephedrine ((–)-ephedrine)	43.1–72.4	236–1,350	>10,000	
(+)-Ephedrine	218	2,104	>10,000	
Dextromethamphetamine (S(+)-methamphetamine)	12.3–13.8	8.5–24.5	736–1,292	
Levomethamphetamine (R(–)-methamphetamine)	28.5	416	4,640	
(+)-Phenylpropanolamine ((+)-norephedrine)	42.1	302	>10,000	
(–)-Phenylpropanolamine ((–)-norephedrine)	137	1,371	>10,000	
Cathine ((+)-norpseudoephedrine)	15.0	68.3	>10,000	
(–)-Norpseudoephedrine	30.1	294	>10,000	
(–)-Pseudoephedrine	4,092	9,125	>10,000	
Pseudoephedrine ((+)-pseudoephedrine)	224	1,988	>10,000	
Notes: The smaller the value, the more strongly the drug releases the neurotransmitter. The assays were done in rat brain synaptosomes and human potencies may be different. See also Monoamine releasing agent § Activity profiles for a larger table with more compounds. Refs:

== Chemistry ==
Cathine is one of the four stereoisomers of phenylpropanolamine (PPA).

== Regulation ==
The World Anti-Doping Agency's list of prohibited substances (used for the Olympic Games among other athletic events) bans cathine in concentrations of over 5 micrograms per milliliter in urine. Cathine is a Schedule III drug under the Convention on Psychotropic Substances. In the United States, it is classified as a Schedule IV controlled substance.

In Australia, Cathine is officially a schedule 4 drug prescription only, but is not available or approved for any medical use.

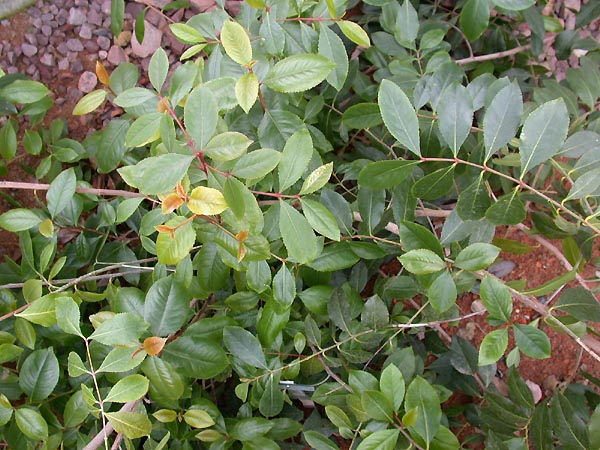
Cathine is found in the shrub khat (Catha edulis).

In Hong Kong, cathine is regulated under Schedule 1 of Hong Kong's Chapter 134 Dangerous Drugs Ordinance. Unlawful possession is punishable by severe fines and imprisonment.

== Pregnancy ==
Ephedra, found in many Ephedraceae species, is a Chinese and Western herb that contains, among other amphetamines, D-norpseudoephedrine. In the National Birth Defects Prevention Study, which included 18,438 women from 10 states from 1999 to 2003, 1.3% of women reported using ephedra during pregnancy. During the trial, five cases of anencephaly were born to women who used ephedra, however there was no statistically significant association to women not using ephedra (odds ratio 2.8, confidence interval 1.0–7.3).

A small study of 642 participants in Yemen found that among pregnant women who chewed khat (containing D-norpseudoephedrine) there was no increased risk of stillbirth or congenital malformations. Among lactating women who chew khat, D-norpseudoephedrine is found in breastmilk.

== See also ==
- L-Norpseudoephedrine, the enantiomer
- Methcathinone
- Ephedra sinica ("Ephedra")
- Ephedrine
- Pseudoephedrine
- Methamphetamine
