= Methamphetamine in the United States =

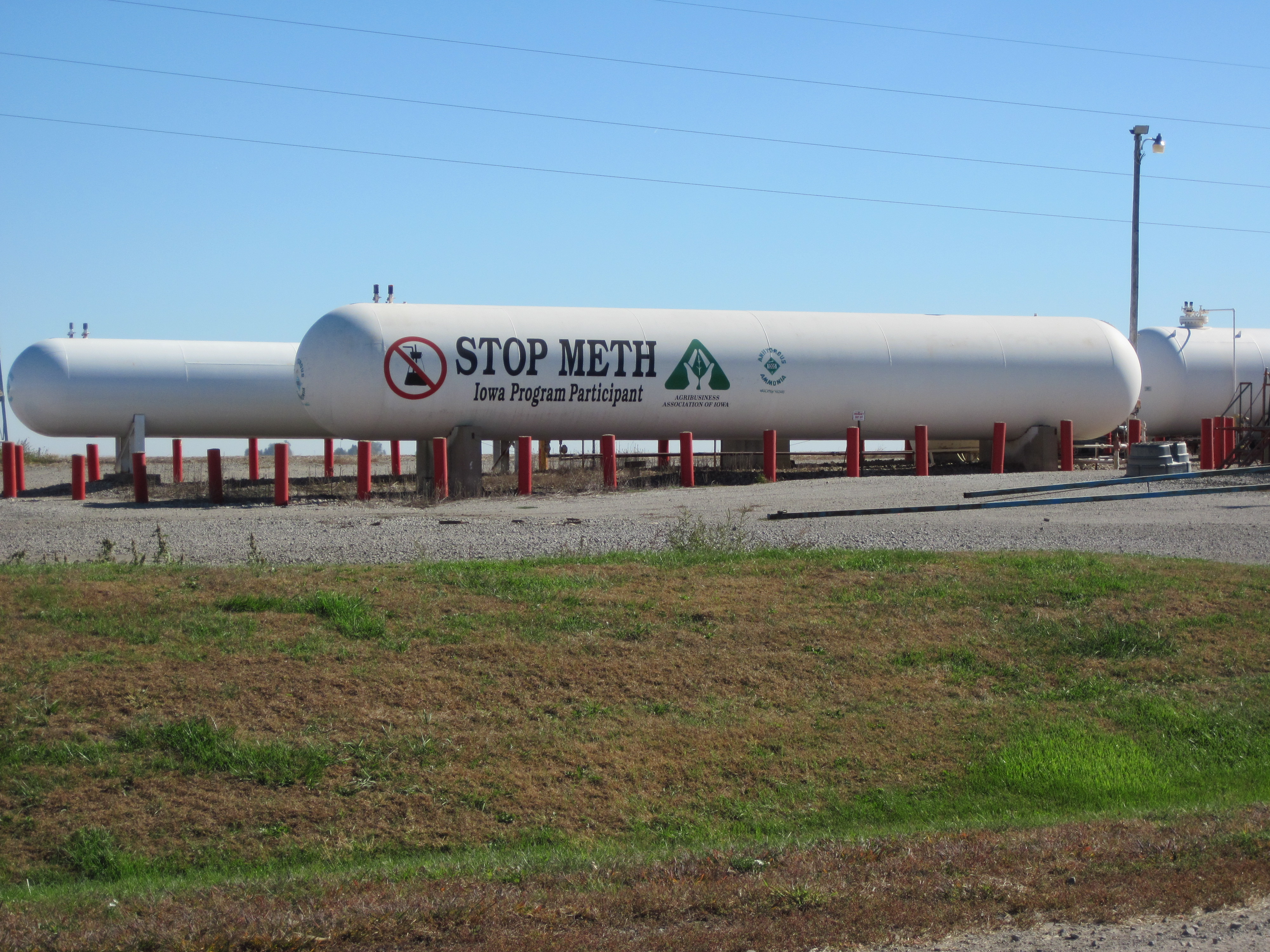
Anti-methamphetamine sign on tank of anhydrous ammonia (Otley, Iowa). Anhydrous ammonia is used in the production of farm fertilizer and is also a critical ingredient in making methamphetamine. In 2005, the state of Iowa gave out thousands of locks in order to prevent criminals from accessing the tanks.

Methamphetamine in the United States is regulated under Schedule I of the Controlled Substances Act. It is approved for pharmacological use in the treatment of attention deficit hyperactivity disorder, narcolepsy, and treatment-resistant obesity, but it is primarily used as a recreational drug. In 2012, 16,000 prescriptions for methamphetamine were filled, approximately 1.2 million Americans reported using it in the past year, and 440,000 reported using the drug in the past month.

Until the 1980s, the methamphetamine market in the United States was dominated by outlaw motorcycle gangs, namely the Hells Angels. Before the late 2000s, much of the methamphetamine consumed in the US was manufactured domestically by amateur chemists in meth labs. They manufactured it from common household drugs and chemicals such as lye, lithium, and ammonia.

But after the Combat Methamphetamine Epidemic Act of 2005 went into effect in 2006, the Drug Enforcement Administration reported a sharp decline in domestic methamphetamine production and consumption. As a result, the amount of methamphetamine seized, the amount of domestic drug labs shut down, and the number of associated deaths and emergency room visits also declined.

However, since then, drug cartels have become the dominant producer of methamphetamine consumed in the US. They manufacture the product in clandestine facilities in Mexico and smuggle it across the border into the country. Deaths linked to methamphetamine overdoses quadrupled between 2011 and 2017. As of 2025, the US Department of State has designated the six most powerful cartels involved in this process: the Sinaloa Cartel, the Jalisco New Generation Cartel, the Gulf Cartel, the Northeast Cartel, the New Michoacán Family, and the United Cartels.

In 2020, the U.S. state of Oregon decriminalized small amounts of methamphetamine.

Due to the ban of ephedrine and pseudoephedrine in 2010 in most countries India and China cut distribution to the cartels. This pushed them into changing the manufacturing process to p2p method. This process creates both isomers of the drug in which the cartels learned to separate with Tartaric Acid. Eventually as the production continued the separated and left over L-methamphetamine started to accrue in abundance. The cartels modified their business by concentrating on fentanyl as of 2017 resulting in selling the remaining L-methamphetamine for a significant lower price until present day. Users noticed the reduced high it produces assuming the chemical process was changed.

== Regulation ==
During the early 1960s, amphetamine was sold in the U.S. as an over-the-counter medicine in the form of an inhaler, until the U.S. Food and Drug Administration restricted its sale to physician prescriptions. In announcing the new rules, FDA Commissioner George P. Larrick told reporters that the FDA had received 153 reports of meth use in 1964, almost three times the 54 cases from 1963, and only five a year in 1960, 1961 and 1962.

In 1970, methamphetamine was regulated in the Controlled Substances Act, and a public education campaign was mounted against it.

In the 1980s, drug treatment counselors saw increased use of the drug among men who have sex with men. Mexican drug manufacturers began bringing methamphetamine north of the border, and forms of methamphetamine that could be smoked were introduced.

In 1983, laws were passed in the United States prohibiting possession of precursors and equipment for methamphetamine production. In 1986, the U.S. government passed the Federal Controlled Substance Analogue Enforcement Act in an attempt to curb the growing use of designer drugs. Despite this, use of methamphetamine expanded from its initial base in California throughout the rural United States, especially through the Midwest and South. "Government officials in a majority of U.S. counties now report that meth is their counties’ most serious drug problem. Meth use is said to be particularly rampant in the American western states, where the substance is in high demand. States like Montana, South Dakota, Idaho, Colorado and Arizona have all launched extensive efforts – both private and public – to fight the meth menace."

Since 1989, five U.S. federal laws and dozens of state laws have been imposed in an attempt to curb the production of methamphetamine. Methamphetamine can be produced in home laboratories using pseudoephedrine or ephedrine, which, at the time, were the active ingredients in over-the-counter drugs such as Sudafed and Contac. Preventive legal strategies of the past 17 years have steadily increased restrictions to the distribution of pseudoephedrine/ephedrine-containing products. As a result "pharmaceutical companies and retailers such as Target, Walgreens, CVS, Kroger and Winn-Dixie have restricted sales of pseudoephedrine-containing products. Purchasers have been limited to buying small quantities and required to show I.D. to purchase them."

In the 1990s, new ways to synthesize methamphetamine appeared. Some new versions were reported to be four to six times stronger. Greatest use was seen in the Southwest and West United States, but methamphetamine use began and grew in the rural Midwest. Rural locations become ideal for cooking of methamphetamine because of geographic isolation and an available supply of ephedrine, pseudoephedrine and anhydrous ammonia.

Attorney General Janet Reno was very outspoken in warning mayors, police chiefs and the Judicial and Executive branches of the Federal government and as a Florida States' Attorney about the dangers of methamphetamine as early as 1996 and before. She was reported by the Orlando Sentinel as commenting that illegal trafficking in methamphetamine, a dangerous and powerful stimulant, had been spreading rapidly across the United States. She appeared at the 68th session of the United States Conference of Mayors Winter Meeting in Washington, D.C., in 2000 with President Bill Clinton and others to discuss social and law enforcement dangers of the drug nationally, especially in medium-sized and rural communities in order to deal with "the rapidly emerging issue of meth in America, discuss the unique needs of smaller and mid-sized communities to deal with the crisis, and develop prevention, treatment and interdiction strategies for meth which can then be applied to cities of all sizes as the methamphetamine crisis spreads across the nation."

As a result of the U.S. Combat Methamphetamine Epidemic Act of 2005 (CMEA), which was passed as an amendment to the renewal of the USA PATRIOT Act, there are restrictions on the amount of pseudoephedrine and ephedrine one may purchase in a specified time period and further requirements that these products must be stored in order to prevent theft. "The CMEA requires record-keeping and identification of all sales and reports to law enforcement of any "suspicious" transactions. Purchasers are limited to "3.6 grams of pseudoephedrine base" per day and 9 grams per month. (Buying more than that is a federal misdemeanor.)" Increasingly strict restrictions have resulted in the reformulation of many over-the-counter drugs, and some, such as Actifed, have been discontinued entirely in the United States.

In 1996, Congress passed the Comprehensive Methamphetamine Control Act, which regulates mail order and chemical companies selling precursor chemicals. For example, people purchasing large quantities of red phosphorus, iodine and hydrochloric gas were required to document that they intended them for legitimate purposes. Law enforcement agents were allowed to track large mail order purchases of pseudoephedrine, another precursor chemical. Chemical supply companies could be prosecuted for selling chemicals to people who make methamphetamine.

By 2000, in the Inland Northwest, and in much of the West United States, methamphetamine was the favored hard drug, surpassing crack and cocaine as the stimulant of choice, as it offered 3.5 times more potency, and a much longer half life. Heroin use was also being surpassed with methamphetamine, which unlike heroin, is not severely cut and reduced in potency with other additive substances. The crystalline form of methamphetamine contained at least 80 percent purity.

The Illinois Methamphetamine Precursor Control Act was passed into state law in 2005 and came into effect in 2006.

== Use ==
=== Legal ===
Methamphetamine is FDA approved for the treatment of ADHD and exogenous obesity. It is dispensed in the USA under the trademark name "Desoxyn" and manufactured by Ovation Pharmaceuticals.

The levorotary form of methamphetamine, called levomethamphetamine, is an over-the-counter drug used in nasal decongestants inhalers.

In 2020, voters in Oregon approved a law decriminalizing possession of small amounts of methamphetamine, making Oregon the first U.S. state to decriminalize methamphetamine.

=== Illegal ===
The Drug Enforcement Administration (DEA) is tasked with combating illegal meth production, distribution and use. The seized quantities of meth can give an idea about its changing popularity through the time.

Quantity of meth lab incidents.
Weight of meth seized (×100 g).

== Hazardous waste ==
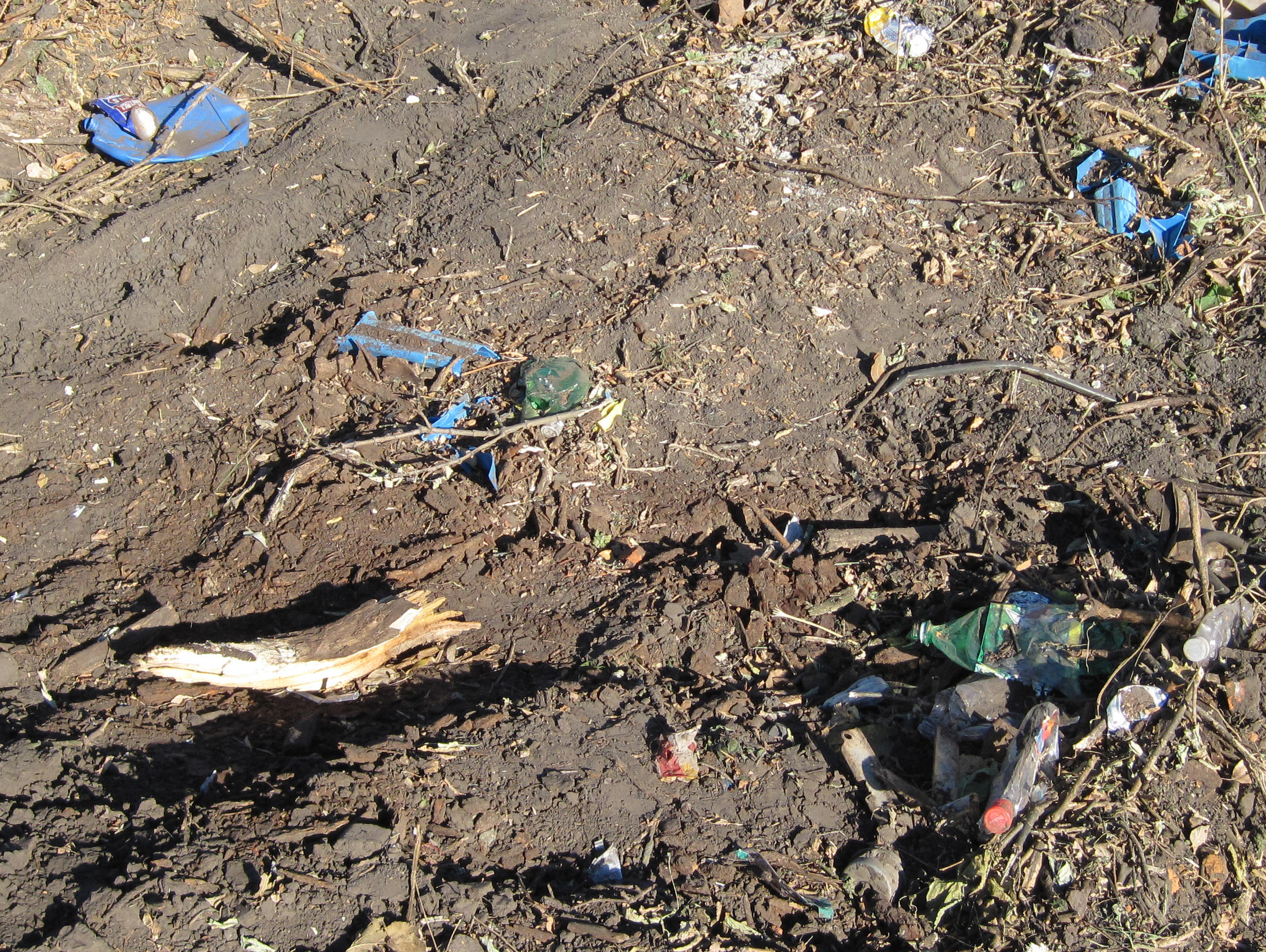
Trash left from an illegal meth lab

Meth lab waste is toxic and extremely hazardous, making cleanup a major problem for authorities and property owners. Common wastes include discarded chemical containers (acid, drain cleaner, iodine, rubbing alcohol, starter fluid, toluene, etc.), chemical-stained cloth and coffee filters, glassware and baking dishes, hoses, lithium batteries, propane tanks, and pseudoephedrine blister packs. According to the US Department of Justice, a meth lab "produces 5 to 7 pounds of toxic waste for every pound of methamphetamine produced. Operators often dispose of this waste improperly, simply by dumping it near the laboratory. This can cause contamination of the soil and nearby water supplies."

Operators of meth labs have been prosecuted for environmental crimes.

== Toxicology ==
Doses of 200 mg or more of methamphetamine are considered lethal. Symptoms of methamphetamine toxicity include difficulty breathing, agitation, heart attack, high body temperature, seizures, stroke, and in extreme cases, coma. There are no standalone drugs to reverse methamphetamine toxicity but benzodiazepines are generally used to manage the physical symptoms of toxicity, while antipsychotic drugs such as olanzapine and haloperidol are used to manage the psychological effects. Harm reduction strategies for preventing meth overdoses include not injecting it and avoiding mixing it with other illicit drugs or prescription medications such as SSRIs, SNRIs and SNDRIs.

== See also ==
- Drugs in the United States
- Crime in the United States
- History and culture of substituted amphetamines
