= Acrivastine =

Chemical compound

Clinical data
- AHFS/Drugs.com: International Drug Names
- Routes of administration: By mouth
- ATC code: R06AX18 (WHO)

Legal status
- Legal status: UK: General sales list (GSL, OTC); US: ℞-only

Pharmacokinetic data
- Elimination half-life: 1.5 hours
- Excretion: Kidney

Identifiers
- IUPAC name: (E)-3-{6-[(E)-1-(4-methylphenyl)-3-pyrrolidin-1-yl- prop-1-enyl]pyridin-2-yl}prop-2-enoic acid
- CAS Number: 87848-99-5
- PubChem CID: 5284514
- ChemSpider: 4447574
- UNII: A20F9XAI7W
- KEGG: D02760
- ChEBI: CHEBI:83168
- ChEMBL: ChEMBL1224
- CompTox Dashboard (EPA): DTXSID6022555
- ECHA InfoCard: 100.110.306

Chemical and physical data
- Formula: C_{22}H_{24}N_{2}O_{2}
- Molar mass: 348.446 g·mol^{−1}
- 3D model (JSmol): Interactive image
- SMILES: O=C(O)\C=C\c3nc(\C(=C\CN1CCCC1)c2ccc(cc2)C)ccc3
- InChI: InChI=1S/C22H24N2O2/c1-17-7-9-18(10-8-17)20(13-16-24-14-2-3-15-24)21-6-4-5-19(23-21)11-12-22(25)26/h4-13H,2-3,14-16H2,1H3,(H,25,26)/b12-11+,20-13+; Key:PWACSDKDOHSSQD-IUTFFREVSA-N

Acrivastine is a medication used for the treatment of allergies and hay fever. It is a second-generation H1-receptor antagonist antihistamine (like its base molecule triprolidine) and works by blocking histamine H1 receptors.

This non-sedating antihistamine is sold under the brand name Benadryl Allergy Relief in the United Kingdom by McNeil Laboratories. It should not be confused with Benadryl Once a Day which has cetirizine as the active ingredient and is also sold by McNeil in the UK, nor with the American Benadryl, which uses diphenhydramine as its active ingredient. It is available as an over-the-counter medicine in the UK, and is available with or without pseudoephedrine under the Benadryl brand.

In the U.S., acrivastine was the active ingredient in Semprex-D. Semprex-D also contains the decongestant pseudoephedrine. Semprex-D was marketed in the U.S. by Actient Pharmaceuticals. Neither version of Semprex-D have been manufactured for sale in the US since 2008.

== Comparisons with other popular antihistamines ==
Unlike cetirizine or loratadine, for which the standard dose is one tablet per day, a single acrivastine tablet may be taken up to three times a day. It is not to be taken by people over the age of 65, pregnant women, or people with compromised liver or kidney function.
