= Combat Methamphetamine Epidemic Act of 2005 =

US law

- Other short titles: Curbing Production of Methamphetamine Bill
- Long title: An Act to further regulate and punish illicit conduct relating to methamphetamine, and for other purposes.
- Acronyms (colloquial): CMEA
- Nicknames: Methamphetamine Epidemic Elimination Act
- Enacted by: the 109th United States Congress
- Effective: March 9, 2006

Citations
- Public law: 109-177
- Statutes at Large: 120 Stat. 192 aka 120 Stat. 256

Codification
- Titles amended: 21 U.S.C.: Food and Drugs; 22 U.S.C.: Foreign Relations and Intercourse; 42 U.S.C.: Public Health and Social Welfare
- U.S.C. sections amended: 21 U.S.C. ch. 13 §§ 801, 802, 814, 823, 830, 844, 860a, 865, 871a; 22 U.S.C. ch. 32, subch. I § 2291; 42 U.S.C. ch. 46, subch. XX § 3797cc

Legislative history
- Introduced in the House as H.R. 3889 by Mark Souder (R–IN) on September 22, 2005; Committee consideration by House Energy and Commerce, House Judiciary, House International Relations, House Transportation and Infrastructure; Passed the House on July 21, 2005 (257-171, Roll call vote 414, via Clerk.House.gov, in lieu of H.R. 3199); Passed the Senate on July 29, 2005 (Passed unanimous consent, in lieu of H.R. 3199); Reported by the joint conference committee on December 8, 2005; agreed to by the House on December 14, 2005 (251-174, Roll call vote 627, via Clerk.House.gov, in lieu of H.R. 3199) and by the Senate on March 2, 2006 (89-10, Roll call vote 29, via Senate.gov, in lieu of H.R. 3199); Signed into law by President George W. Bush on March 9, 2006

The Combat Methamphetamine Epidemic Act of 2005 (CMEA) is federal legislation enacted in the United States on March 9, 2006, to regulate, among other things, retail over-the-counter sales of following products because of their use in the manufacture of illegal drugs:

- ephedrine
- pseudoephedrine
- phenylpropanolamine (no longer OTC due to a proposed increased risk of stroke in younger women)

Retail provisions of the CMEA include daily sales limits and 30-day purchase limits, placement of product out of direct customer access, sales logbooks, customer ID verification, employee training, and self-certification of regulated sellers. The CMEA is found as Title VII of the USA PATRIOT Improvement and Reauthorization Act of 2005 (H.R. 3199). The last provisions of the law took effect on 30 September 2006.

== Justification ==
Ephedrine, pseudoephedrine, and phenylpropanolamine are precursor chemicals used in the illicit manufacture of methamphetamine or amphetamine. They are also common ingredients used to make cough, cold, and allergy products. It was argued that the CMEA would curtail the clandestine production of methamphetamine. The U.S. Department of Justice claimed that states that had enacted similar or more restrictive retail regulations saw dramatic drops in the numbers of small clandestine labs.

== Provisions ==
"The CMEA requires record-keeping and identification of all sales and reports to law enforcement of any 'suspicious' transactions. Purchasers are limited to '3.6 grams of pseudoephedrine base' per day and 9 grams per month. (Buying more than that is a federal misdemeanor.)"

The statute also includes the following requirements for merchants who sell these products:

- A retrievable record of all purchases identifying the name and address of each party to be kept for two years
- Required verification of proof of identity of all purchasers
- Required protection and disclosure methods in the collection of personal information
- Reports to the Attorney General of any suspicious payments or disappearances of the regulated products
- Required training of employees with regard to the requirements of the CMEA; Retailer must self-certify as to training and compliance
- Non-liquid dose form of regulated product may only be sold in unit dose blister packs
- Regulated products are to be sold behind the counter or in a locked cabinet in such a way as to restrict public access
- Daily sales of regulated products not to exceed 3.6 grams without regard to the number of transactions
- 30 day (not monthly) sales limit not to exceed 7.5 grams if sold by mail-order or "mobile retail vendor"
- 30 day purchase limit not to exceed 9 grams of pseudoephedrine base in regulated products (misdemeanor possession offense under 21 USC 844a for the individual who buys it)
- Prescriptions are exempt from logbook requirements.

== First arrest ==
In September 2006, Tim Naveau was arrested and charged with a Class-B misdemeanor for purchasing Claritin-D. Naveau takes one tablet of Claritin D each day to combat allergies, and he "had stocked up on the allergy medication because his teenage son, who was also an allergy sufferer, needed several packages because he was headed off to a church camp." Minors are not permitted to purchase pseudoephedrine under the law. Naveau had gone over the legal limit for pseudoephedrine when he purchased extra Claritin-D to give to his son before he attended church camp.

== See also ==
- Illinois Methamphetamine Precursor Control Act
- Drug precursors
- National Precursor Log Exchange - a national realtime electronic logbook adopted by many states and retail chains.
