= Ephedrine dehydrogenase =

Enzyme

ephedrine dehydrogenase

Identifiers
- EC no.: 1.5.1.18
- CAS no.: 73508-06-2

Databases
- IntEnz: IntEnz view
- BRENDA: BRENDA entry
- ExPASy: NiceZyme view
- KEGG: KEGG entry
- MetaCyc: metabolic pathway
- PRIAM: profile
- PDB structures: RCSB PDB PDBe PDBsum
- Gene Ontology: AmiGO / QuickGO
Search
- PMC: articles
- PubMed: articles
- NCBI: proteins

In enzymology, ephedrine dehydrogenase (EC 1.5.1.18) is an enzyme that catalyzes the chemical reaction

ephedrine
+ NAD^{+}
H_{2}O
H^{+}
H_{2}O
H^{+}
(-)-phenylacetylcarbinol
+ NADH + CH_{3}NH_{2}

The two substrates of this enzyme are ephedrine and oxidised nicotinamide adenine dinucleotide (NAD^{+}). This forms an imine intermediate which spontaneously hydrolyses to give (-)-phenylacetylcarbinol and methylamine. The enzyme was isolated from a strain of the soil bacterium Pseudomonas putida which uses ephedrine as its sole source of carbon.

This enzyme belongs to the family of oxidoreductases, specifically those acting on the CH-NH group of donor with NAD+ or NADP+ as acceptor. The systematic name of this enzyme class is (-)-ephedrine:NAD+ 2-oxidoreductase.
