= Cetirizine/pseudoephedrine =

Combination medication

Combination of
- Cetirizine: Antihistamine
- Pseudoephedrine: Decongestant

Clinical data
- Trade names: Zyrtec-D, others
- AHFS/Drugs.com: Multum Consumer Information
- License data: US DailyMed: Cetirizine and pseudoephedrine
- Routes of administration: By mouth
- ATC code: R01BA52 (WHO)

Legal status
- Legal status: US: OTC

Cetirizine/pseudoephedrine, sold under the brand name Zyrtec-D among others, is an antihistamine and decongestant formulation used for the symptoms related to seasonal allergic rhinitis. It is a fixed-dose combination medication that contains cetirizine, a second-generation antihistamine, as the hydrochloride; and pseudoephedrine, a sympathomimetic nasal decongestant, as the hydrochloride. It is taken by mouth.

Cetirizine/pseudoephedrine was approved by the US Food and Drug Administration in 2001, as a prescription medication and as an over-the-counter medication (OTC) in 2007.
