= Sinutab =

Sinus, allergy and pain relief medication

Sinutab is a sinus, allergy and pain relief medication originally marketed by Warner–Lambert. It is manufactured and distributed by Johnson & Johnson after its acquisition of Pfizer's consumer healthcare division in late December 2006. It is packaged as white, round, biconvex, uncoated tablets, with each tablet containing 30 mg of pseudoephedrine hydrochloride (PSE), 500 mg of paracetamol (acetaminophen) and 2 mg of chlorpheniramine maleate (CPM) as the active ingredients.
