= Nexafed =

Nexafed is a formulation of pseudoephedrine developed by Acura Pharmaceuticals used to deter the use of the pseudoephedrine contained in the product for illicit methamphetamine synthesis. Nexafed uses a polymer matrix that forms a thick gel when hydrated, preventing the extraction of pseudoephedrine. Nexafed is the only meth-resistant formulation of pseudoephedrine that shows therapeutic equivalence to Sudafed.

It is sold at various pharmacies in the US, including Kroger, particularly in communities where illicit methamphetamine production is an issue.
