= Naproxen/pseudoephedrine =

Combination drug

Combination of
- Naproxen: Nonsteroidal anti-inflammatory drug (NSAID)
- Pseudoephedrine: Nasal decongestant

Clinical data
- Trade names: Aleve-D, others
- AHFS/Drugs.com: Multum Consumer Information
- License data: US DailyMed: Naproxen pseudoephedrine
- Routes of administration: By mouth
- ATC code: R01BA52 (WHO)

Legal status
- Legal status: US: OTC

Naproxen/pseudoephedrine, sold under the brand name Aleve-D among others, is a fixed-dose combination medication used for the treatment of nasal congestion and other symptoms of the common cold. It contains naproxen, as the sodium salt, a nonsteroidal anti-inflammatory drug (NSAID); and pseudoephedrine, as the hydrochloride, a nasal decongestant.
