= Comprehensive Methamphetamine Control Act of 1996 =

US law

- Long title: An Act to prevent the illegal manufacturing and use of methamphetamine.
- Enacted by: the 104th United States Congress
- Effective: October 3, 1996

Citations
- Public law: Pub. L. 104–237 (text) (PDF)
- Statutes at Large: 110 Stat. 3099

Codification
- Titles amended: 21 U.S.C.: Food and Drugs; 28 U.S.C.: Judiciary and Judicial Procedure
- U.S.C. sections amended: 21 U.S.C. ch. 13, subch. I § 801 et seq.; 21 U.S.C. ch. 13, subch. I § 872 et seq.; 21 U.S.C. ch. 13, subch. II § 971; 28 U.S.C. ch. 58 § 994

Legislative history
- Introduced in the Senate as S. 1965 by Orrin Hatch (R–UT) on July 17, 1996; Committee consideration by House Judiciary, House Commerce; Passed the Senate on September 17, 1996 (passed unanimous consent); Passed the House on September 26, 1996 (386-34 Roll call vote 434, via Clerk.House.gov, in lieu of H.R. 3852); Signed into law by President Bill Clinton on October 3, 1996

The Comprehensive Methamphetamine Control Act of 1996 is a bill (S. 1965) enacted into law (Pub. L. 104–237 (text) (PDF)) by the 104th Congress of the United States. It mandated registration of persons trading in list I chemicals from the DEA list of chemicals. A fee for such registration was initially $595 but later reduced to $116. It is regarded as one of the major drug laws in the United States.

== Provisions of the Act ==
The Comprehensive Methamphetamine Control Act was composed as five titles sanctioning legislative authority for the control, exportation, importation, and manufacturing of methamphetamine substances and precursor chemicals.

Congressional assessment with regards to methamphetamine substances and precursor chemicals -

The 104th U.S. Congress finds the following :

(1) Methamphetamine is a very dangerous and harmful drug. It is highly addictive and is associated with permanent brain damage in long-term users.
(2) The abuse of methamphetamine has increased dramatically since 1990. This increased use has led to devastating effects on individuals and the community, including —

(A) dramatic increase in deaths associated with methamphetamine ingestion
(B) increase in the number of violent crimes associated with methamphetamine ingestion
(C) increase in criminal activity associated with the illegal importation of methamphetamine and precursor compounds to support the growing appetite for this drug in the United States

(3) Illegal methamphetamine manufacture and abuse presents an imminent public health threat that warrants aggressive law enforcement action, increased research on methamphetamine and other substance abuse, increased coordinated efforts to prevent methamphetamine abuse, and increased monitoring of the public health threat methamphetamine presents to the communities of the United States.

=== Title I - Importation of Methamphetamine and Precursor Chemicals ===
==== Support for International Efforts to Control Drugs ====
Attorney General, in consultation with the Secretary of State, shall coordinate international drug enforcement efforts to decrease the movement of methamphetamine and methamphetamine precursors into the United States.

=== Title II - Provisions to Control the Manufacture of Methamphetamine ===
==== Seizure and Forfeiture of Regulated Chemicals ====
It shall be unlawful for any person knowingly or intentionally to possess any list I chemical obtained pursuant to or under authority of a registration issued to that person if that registration has been revoked or suspended, if that registration has expired, or if the registrant has ceased to do business in the manner contemplated by the registration.

==== Study and Report on Measures to Prevent Sales of Agents used in Methamphetamine Production ====
(a) STUDY — The Attorney General of the United States shall conduct a study on possible measures to effectively prevent the diversion of red phosphorus, iodine, hydrochloric gas, and other agents for use in the production of methamphetamine. Nothing in this section shall preclude the Attorney General from taking any action the Attorney General already is authorized to take with regard to the regulation of listed chemicals under current law.
(b) REPORT — Not later than January 1, 1998, the Attorney General shall submit a report to the Congress of its findings pursuant to the study conducted on the need for and advisability of preventive measures.
(c) CONSIDERATIONS — In developing recommendations, the Attorney General shall consider —

(1) the use of red phosphorus, iodine, hydrogen chloride, and other agents in the illegal manufacture of methamphetamine
(2) the use of red phosphorus, iodine, hydrogen chloride, and other agents for legitimate and legal purposes, and the impact any regulations may have on these legitimate purposes
(3) comments and recommendations from law enforcement, manufacturers of such chemicals, and the consumers of such chemicals for legitimate and legal purposes

==== Increased Penalties for Manufacture and Possession of Equipment Used to Make Controlled Substances ====
Any person who, with the intent to manufacture or to facilitate the manufacture of methamphetamine, shall be sentenced to a term of imprisonment of not more than ten years, a fine of not more than $30,000, or both; except that if any person commits such a violation after one or more prior convictions of that person.
Under any other law of the United States or any State relating to controlled substances or listed chemicals, has become fined, such person shall be sentenced to a term of imprisonment of not more than twenty years, a fine of not more than $60,000, or both.

==== Addition of Iodine and Hydrogen Chloride to List II ====
Controlled Substances Act is amended by adding at the end the following:

(I) Iodine
(J) Hydrogen chloride

==== Civil Penalties for Firms that Supply Precursor Chemicals ====
(a) OFFENSES — To distribute a laboratory supply to a person who uses, or attempts to use, that laboratory supply to manufacture a controlled substance or a listed chemical, in violation of this title or title III, with reckless disregard for the illegal uses to which such a laboratory supply will be put. As used, the term 'laboratory supply' means a listed chemical or any chemical, substance, or item on a special surveillance list published by the Attorney General, which contains chemicals, products, materials, or equipment used in the manufacture of controlled substances and listed chemicals. There is a rebuttable presumption of reckless disregard at trial if the Attorney General notifies a firm in writing that a laboratory supply sold by the firm, or any other person or firm, has been used by a customer of the notified firm, or distributed further by that customer, for the unlawful production of controlled substances or listed chemicals a firm distributes and two weeks or more after the notification the notified firm distributes a laboratory supply to the customer.
(b) CIVIL PENALTY — Penalties set forth elsewhere in this title or title III, any business that violates shall, with respect to the first such violation, be subject to a civil penalty of not more than $250,000, but shall not be subject to criminal penalties, and shall, for any succeeding violation, be subject to a civil fine of not more than $250,000 or double the last previously imposed penalty, whichever is greater.

==== Injunctive Relief ====
INJUNCTIONS — In addition to any penalty, the Attorney General is authorized to commence a civil action for appropriate declaratory or injunctive relief relating to violations.

==== Restitution for Cleanup of Clandestine Laboratory Sites ====
The court, when sentencing a defendant convicted of an offense under this title or title III involving the manufacture of methamphetamine, may order the defendant to reimburse the United States for the costs incurred by the United States for the clandestine chemical cleanup associated with the manufacture of methamphetamine by the defendant.

=== Title III - Increased Penalties for Trafficking and Manufacture of Methamphetamine and Precursors ===
==== Penalty Increases for Trafficking in Methamphetamine ====
(a) DIRECTIVE TO THE UNITED STATES SENTENCING COMMISSION — Pursuant to its authority, the United States Sentencing Commission shall review and amend its guidelines and its policy statements to provide for increased penalties for unlawful manufacturing, importing, exporting, and trafficking of methamphetamine, and other similar offenses, including unlawful possession with intent to commit any of those offenses, and attempt and conspiracy to commit any of those offenses. The Commission shall submit to Congress explanations therefor and any additional policy recommendations for combating methamphetamine offenses.
(b) IN GENERAL — Any recommendations submitted under such subsection reflect the heinous nature of such offenses, the need for aggressive law enforcement action to fight such offenses, and the extreme dangers associated with unlawful activity involving methamphetamine, including —

(1) rapidly growing incidence of methamphetamine abuse and the threat to public safety such abuse poses
(2) high risk of methamphetamine addiction
(3) increased risk of violence associated with methamphetamine trafficking and abuse
(4) recent increase in the illegal importation of methamphetamine and precursor chemicals

==== Enhanced Penalties for Offenses Involving Certain Listed Chemicals ====
The United States Sentencing Commission shall amend the sentencing guidelines to increase by at least two levels the offense level for offenses involving list I chemicals.

=== Title IV - Legal Manufacture, Distribution, and Sale of Precursor Chemicals ===
Pseudoephedrine or its salts, optical isomers, or salts of optical isomers, or phenylpropanolamine or its salts, optical isomers, or salts of optical isomers unless otherwise provided by regulation of the Attorney General.

(1) sale of ordinary over-the-counter pseudoephedrine or phenylpropanolamine products by retail distributors shall not be a regulated transaction
(2) threshold for any sale of products containing pseudoephedrine or phenylpropanolamine products by retail distributors or by distributors required to submit reports by this title shall be twenty-four grams of pseudoephedrine or twenty-four grams of phenylpropanolamine in a single transaction

=== Title V - Education and Research ===
==== Interagency Methamphetamine Task Force ====
(a) ESTABLISHMENT — Establish a "Methamphetamine Interagency Task Force" which shall consist of the following members :

(1) Attorney General, or a designee, who shall serve as chair
(2) Two representatives selected by the Attorney General
(3) Secretary of Education or a designee
(4) Secretary of Health and Human Services or a designee
(5) Two representatives of State and local law enforcement and regulatory agencies, to be selected by the Attorney General
(6) Two representatives selected by the Secretary of Health and Human Services
(7) Five nongovernmental experts in drug abuse prevention and treatment to be selected by the Attorney General

==== Public Health Monitoring ====
Secretary of Health and Human Services shall develop a public health monitoring program to monitor methamphetamine abuse in the United States. The program shall include the collection and dissemination of data related to methamphetamine abuse which can be used by public health officials in policy development.

==== Public-Private Education Program ====
(a) ADVISORY PANEL — Attorney General shall establish an advisory panel consisting of an appropriate number o representatives from Federal, State, and local law enforcement and regulatory agencies with experience in investigating and prosecuting illegal transactions of precursor chemicals. Attorney General shall convene the panel as often as necessary to develop and coordinate educational programs for wholesale and retail distributors of precursor chemicals and supplies.
(b) CONTINUATION OF CURRENT EFFORTS — Attorney General shall continue to —

(1) maintain an active program of seminars and training to educate wholesale and retail distributors of precursor chemicals and supplies regarding the identification of suspicious transactions and their responsibility to report such transactions
(2) provide assistance to State and local law enforcement and regulatory agencies to facilitate the establishment and maintenance of educational programs for distributors of precursor chemicals and supplies

==== Suspicious Orders Task Force ====
(a) IN GENERAL — Attorney General shall establish a "Suspicious Orders Task Force" which shall consist of —

(1) appropriate personnel from the Drug Enforcement Administration and other Federal, State, and local law enforcement and regulatory agencies with the experience in investigating and prosecuting illegal transactions of listed chemicals and supplies
(2) representatives from the chemical and pharmaceutical industry

(b) RESPONSIBILITIES — Task Force shall be responsible for developing proposals to define suspicious orders of listed chemicals, and particularly to develop quantifiable parameters which can be used by registrants in determining if an order is a suspicious order which must be reported to DEA. The quantifiable parameters to be addressed will include frequency of orders, deviations from prior orders, and size of orders. Task Force shall also recommend provisions as to what types of payment practices or unusual business practices shall constitute prima facie suspicious orders. In evaluating the proposals, the Task Force shall consider effectiveness, cost and feasibility for industry and government, and other relevant factors.
(c) MEETINGS — Task Force shall meet at least two times per year and at such other times as may be determined necessary by the Task Force.
(d) REPORT — Task Force shall present a report to the Attorney General on its proposals with regards to suspicious orders and the electronic reporting of suspicious orders within one year of the date of enactment of this Act. Copies of the report shall be forwarded to the Committees of the Senate and House of Representatives having jurisdiction over the regulation of listed chemical and controlled substances.
