= Fexofenadine/pseudoephedrine =

Combination drug

Combination of
- Fexofenadine: Antihistamine
- Pseudoephedrine: Nasal decongestant

Clinical data
- Trade names: Allegra-D
- MedlinePlus: a601053
- License data: US DailyMed: Fexofenadine hydrochloride and pseudoephedrine hydrochloride
- Pregnancy category: AU: B2
- Routes of administration: By mouth
- ATC code: R01BA52 (WHO)

Legal status
- Legal status: AU: S3 (Pharmacist only); CA: OTC; US: OTC

Identifiers
- KEGG: D10252

Fexofenadine/pseudoephedrine, sold under the brand name Allegra-D among others, is a fixed-dose combination medication used for the treatment of nasal congestion and other symptoms of allergies and the common cold. It contains fexofenadine, as the hydrochloride, an antihistamine; and pseudoephedrine, as the hydrochloride, a nasal decongestant.

In 2023, it was the 307th most commonly prescribed medication in the United States, with more than 300,000 prescriptions.
