= Illinois Methamphetamine Precursor Control Act =

The Methamphetamine Precursor Control Act (MPCA, 720 ILCS 648) is an Illinois state law that was signed into law on November 16, 2005, and took effect on January 15, 2006. The MPCA is an act used to create significant barriers such as the requirement to present ID to purchase cold medication that contains pseudoephedrine (Sudafed, Tylenol Cold and Claritin D) which could be used to produce methamphetamine. This is one of many state laws regulating the supply of pseudoephedrine that preceded the federal Combat Methamphetamine Epidemic Act of 2005.

The Act was introduced in the 94th Illinois General Assembly by senator James A. DeLeo as Senate Bill 273, on February 3, 2005.

== Methamphetamine Precursor Control Act - Amended ==
In 2008, the Illinois state legislature amended the MPCA creating a regional authority to establish a pilot program that targets individuals who are circumventing the law. As a result, the Southern Illinois counties of Williamson, Jackson, Union, Saline, Franklin, and Johnson, comprise the Illinois Meth Precursor Control Pilot Authority (IMPCPA).
