= Pseudoephedrine/loratadine =

Allergy medicine

Combination of
- Pseudoephedrine: Sympathomimetic
- Loratadine: H_{1} antagonist

Clinical data
- Trade names: Claritin-D, others
- AHFS/Drugs.com: claritin-d
- Routes of administration: By mouth
- ATC code: R01BA52 (WHO)

Legal status
- Legal status: US: OTC

Identifiers
- CAS Number: 156098-07-6

Pseudoephedrine/loratadine, sold under the brand name Claritin-D among others, is an orally administered combination medication used for the treatment of allergic rhinitis (hay fever) and the common cold. Pseudoephedrine, one of the naturally occurring alkaloids of ephedra, is a sympathomimetic used as a decongestant. It produces a decongestant effect that is facilitated by the vasoconstriction in the mucosal capillaries of the upper respiratory areas. Loratadine is a long-acting antihistamine (H_{1} histamine antagonist) that is less sedating than older substances of its type.

In 2023, it was the 300th most commonly prescribed medication in the United States, with more than 400,000 prescriptions.

== Medical uses ==
Pseudoephedrine/loratadine are indicated for the relief of symptoms associated with allergic rhinitis and the common cold including nasal congestion, sneezing, rhinorrhea, pruritus, and lacrimation.

== Composition ==
=== Clarinase Repetabs ===
A Clarinase Repetab tablet contains 5 mg loratadine in the tablet coating and 120 mg pseudoephedrine sulfate equally distributed between the tablet coating and the barrier-coated core.The two active components in the coating are quickly liberated; release of pseudoephedrine in the core is delayed for several hours.

== Interactions, adverse effects and contraindications ==
Interactions, adverse effects and contraindications are described in more detail in the articles about pseudoephedrine and loratadine.

=== Interactions ===
When sympathomimetics are given to patients receiving monoamine oxidase inhibitors (MAO inhibitors), hypertensive reactions, including hypertensive crises may occur.

=== Adverse effects ===
During controlled clinical studies with the recommended dosage, the incidence of adverse effects was comparable to that of placebo, with the exception of insomnia and dry mouth, both of which were commonly reported.

=== Contraindications ===
Pseudoephedrine/loratadine is contraindicated in people receiving MAO inhibitor therapy or within 14 days of discontinuing such treatment and in people with narrow angle glaucoma, urinary retention, severe hypertension, severe coronary artery disease and hyperthyroidism.

== Society and culture ==
=== Brand names ===
It is sold under various brand names including Claritin-D, Clarinase, Clarinase Repetabs, Lorinase, Rhinos SR, and Allerclear-D.
