= Acura Pharmaceuticals =

Acura Pharmaceuticals Inc.
- Company type: Public
- Traded as: Nasdaq: ACUR
- Industry: Pharmaceutical industry
- Founded: 1935; 91 years ago
- Headquarters: Palatine, Illinois
- Products: Pharmaceuticals
- Revenue: ▲US$ .75 million (2015)
- Website: acurapharm.com

Acura Pharmaceuticals Inc. is a pharmaceutical company focused on the development and commercialization of deterrents to medication abuse and misuse. As of 2012, the company had several opioid products under development, which would use "Aversion Technology". As of 2014, it was a publicly traded company, listed on NASDAQ under the symbol "ACUR".

== History ==
In 2013, the Company settled Oxecta patent litigation with Impax Laboratories (IPXL) and Par Pharmaceutical.

License agreements

The company has an agreement to license, develop and commercialize opioid analgesic products with King Pharmaceuticals.

Product adoptions

In 2013, multiple retailers – including Kroger and Fruth Pharmacy – stocked Acura's product Nexafed.
