= Acidifier =

Inorganic chemicals that either produce or become acid

Acidifiers are inorganic chemicals that, put into a human (or other mammalian) body, either produce or become acid.

These chemicals increase the level of gastric acid in the stomach when ingested, thus decreasing the stomach pH.

== Types ==
Out of many types of acidifiers, the main four are:

- Gastric acidifiers, these are the drugs which are used to restore temporarily the acidity of stomach in patient suffering from hypochlorhydria
- Systemic acidifiers, used to control pH in the overall body
- Urinary acidifiers, used to control pH in urine
- Acids, mostly used in laboratory experiments

Acidifier performance in distal stomach is debatable.

== Application ==
Patients who suffer from achlorhydria have deficient secretion of hydrochloric acid in their stomach. In such cases, acidifiers may provide sufficient acidity for proper digestion of food. Systemic acidifiers, usually given by injection, act by reducing the alkali reserve in the body, and are also useful in reducing metabolic alkalosis.
