= Phenylacetylcarbinol =

- LPAC

Names
- IUPAC name 1-hydroxy-1-phenyl-propan-2-one
- Other names l-PAC (R)-PAC

Identifiers
CAS Number	1798-60-3
3D model (JSmol)	Interactive image
ChEBI	CHEBI:149766
ChemSpider	8096061
ECHA InfoCard	100.001.824
PubChem CID	92733
UNII	7V3493I8FQ
CompTox Dashboard (EPA)	DTXSID50861683
- InChI: InChI=1S/C9H10O2/c1-7(10)9(11)8-5-3-2-4-6-8/h2-6,9,11H,1H3/t9-/m0/s1 Key: ZBFFNPODXBJBPW-VIFPVBQESA-N; InChI=1/C9H10O2/c1-7(10)9(11)8-5-3-2-4-6-8/h2-6,9,11H,1H3/t9-/m0/s1 Key: ZBFFNPODXBJBPW-VIFPVBQEBH
- SMILES: CC(=O)[C@@H](C1=CC=CC=C1)O

Properties
Chemical formula	C_{9}H_{10}O_{2}
Molar mass	150.177 g·mol^{−1}
Appearance	Yellow-green liquid
Density	1.119 g/cm^{3}
Melting point	9–11 °C (48–52 °F; 282–284 K)
Boiling point	253 °C (487 °F; 526 K)
Solubility in water	Insoluble
Solubility in other solvents	Freely soluble in alcohols, ether, and aromatic solvents
- Except where otherwise noted, data are given for materials in their standard state (at 25 °C [77 °F], 100 kPa). verify (what is ?) Infobox references

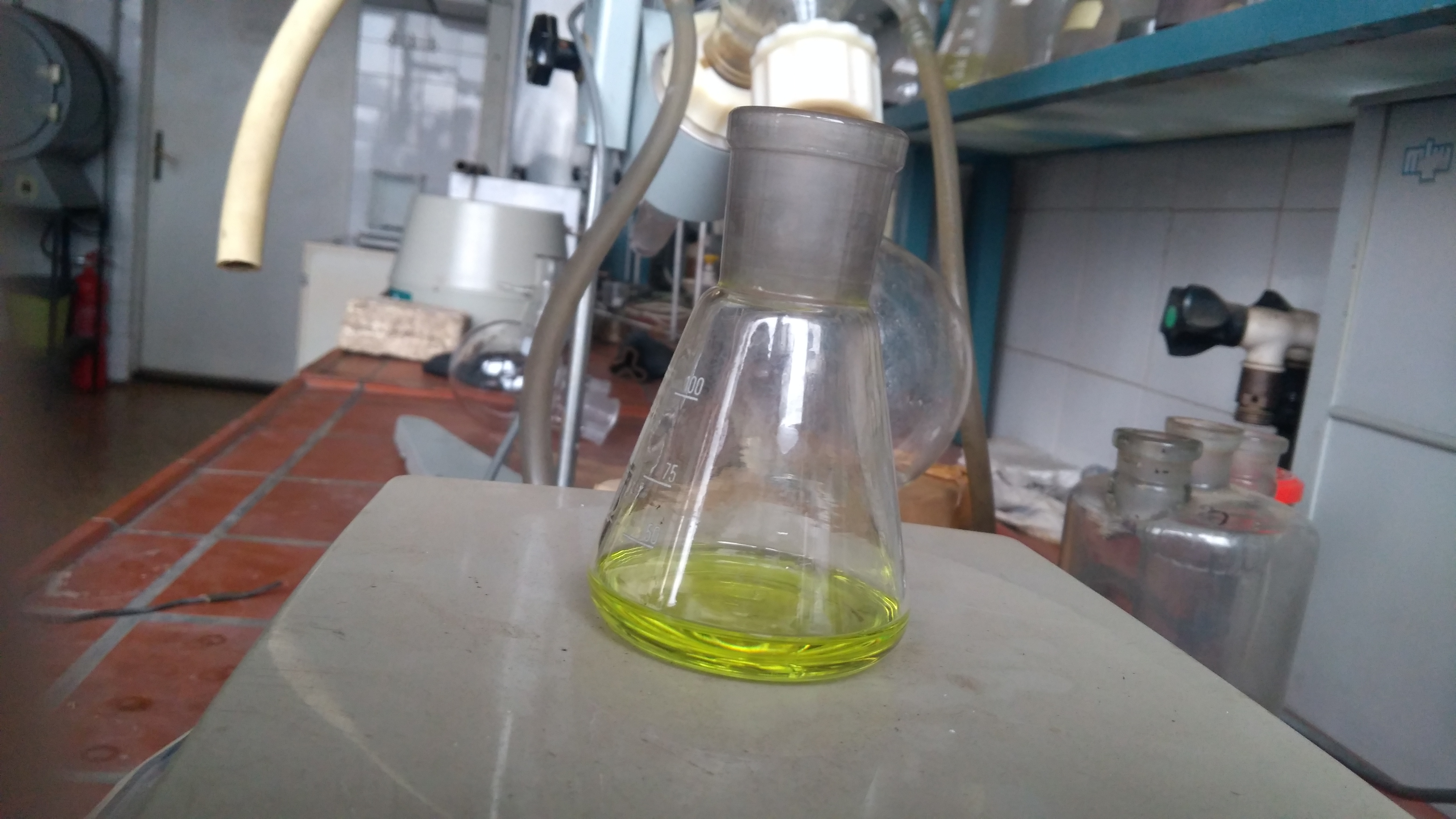
L-pac produced by biotransformation of benzaldehyde

Phenylacetylcarbinol (PAC) is an organic compound that has two enantiomers, one with R- and one with S-configuration. (R)-PAC, which is commonly called l-PAC, is known as a precursor in the synthesis of pharmaceuticals such as ephedrine and pseudoephedrine.

== Nomenclature ==
(R)-PAC or (R)-(−)-phenylacetylcarbinol is identical to l-PAC, referring to the outdated d/l system. (R)-PAC is the levo-rotating isomer of phenylacetylcarbinol.

The IUPAC name of phenylacetylcarbinol is 1-hydroxy-1-phenylpropan-2-one. Synonyms are 1-hydroxy-1-phenyl-2-propanone and 1-Hydroxy-1-phenylacetone.

== Production ==
(R)-PAC is widely synthesized by fermentation of benzaldehyde and dextrose. In this process, colonies of yeast (in particular, strains such as Candida utilis, Torulaspora delbrueckii, or Saccharomyces cerevisiae) are cultivated and added to a broth of water, dextrose, and the enzyme pyruvate decarboxylase in a vat. The yeast is left to grow for a period of time, after which the benzaldehyde is introduced into the broth. The yeast then ferments the benzaldehyde into (R)-PAC. Boiling point at 12mmHg is 124-125C.

The majority of L-PAC is generated in pharmaceutical plants in India, as an intermediate precursor in the production of pseudoephedrine.

There are also biochemical reactions where enzymes such as acetohydroxyacid synthase I from E. coli condense pyruvate and benzaldehyde into R-PAC. Such methods have much higher conversion rates in comparison to the conventional yeast fermentation.
