= Loratadine =

Antihistamine medication

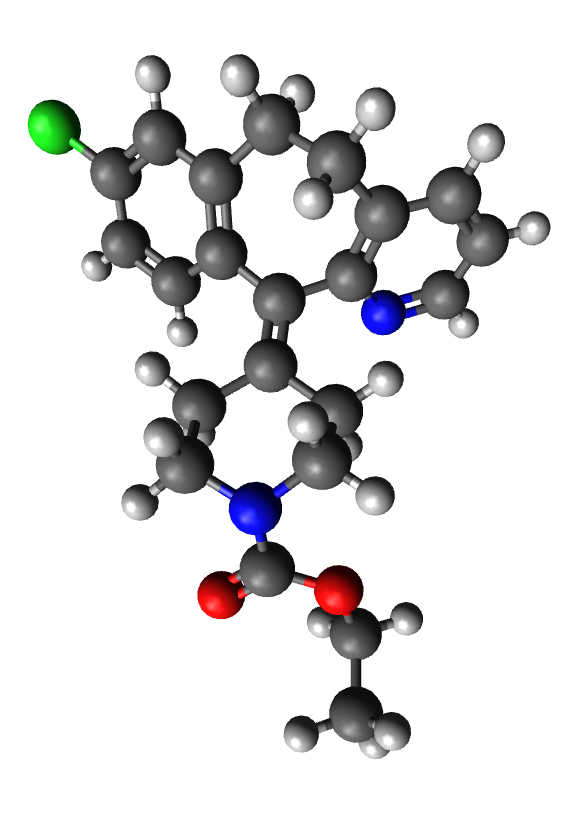

Clinical data
- Trade names: Claritin, Claratyne, Clarityn, others
- AHFS/Drugs.com: Monograph
- MedlinePlus: a697038
- License data: US DailyMed: Loratadine
- Pregnancy category: AU: B1
- Routes of administration: By mouth
- Drug class: Second-generation antihistamine
- ATC code: R06AX13 (WHO)

Legal status
- Legal status: AU: OTC; CA: OTC; UK: General sales list (GSL, OTC) / Pharmacy; US: OTC / Rx-only

Pharmacokinetic data
- Bioavailability: almost 100%
- Protein binding: 97–99%
- Metabolism: Liver (CYP2D6- and 3A4-mediated)
- Elimination half-life: 8 hours, active metabolite desloratadine 27 hours
- Excretion: 40% as conjugated metabolites into urine Similar amount into the feces

Identifiers
- IUPAC name: Ethyl 4-(8-chloro-5,6-dihydro-11H-benzo[5,6]cyclohepta[1,2-b]pyridin-11-ylidene)-1-piperidinecarboxylate
- CAS Number: 79794-75-5
- PubChem CID: 3957
- IUPHAR/BPS: 7216
- DrugBank: DB00455
- ChemSpider: 3820
- UNII: 7AJO3BO7QN
- KEGG: D00364
- ChEBI: CHEBI:6538
- ChEMBL: ChEMBL998
- CompTox Dashboard (EPA): DTXSID2023224
- ECHA InfoCard: 100.120.122

Chemical and physical data
- Formula: C_{22}H_{23}ClN_{2}O_{2}
- Molar mass: 382.89 g·mol^{−1}
- 3D model (JSmol): Interactive image
- SMILES: O=C(OCC)N4CC/C(=C2/c1ccc(Cl)cc1CCc3cccnc23)CC4
- InChI: InChI=1S/C22H23ClN2O2/c1-2-27-22(26)25-12-9-15(10-13-25)20-19-8-7-18(23)14-17(19)6-5-16-4-3-11-24-21(16)20/h3-4,7-8,11,14H,2,5-6,9-10,12-13H2,1H3; Key:JCCNYMKQOSZNPW-UHFFFAOYSA-N

Loratadine, sold under the brand name Claritin among others, is a medication used to treat allergies. This includes allergic rhinitis (hay fever) and hives. It is also available in drug combinations such as loratadine/pseudoephedrine, in which it is combined with pseudoephedrine, a nasal decongestant. It is taken orally.

Common side effects include sleepiness, dry mouth, and headache. Serious side effects are rare and include allergic reactions, seizures, and liver problems. Use during pregnancy appears to be safe but has not been well studied. It is not recommended in children less than two years old. It is in the second-generation antihistamine family of medications.

Loratadine was patented in 1980 and came to market in 1988. It is on the World Health Organization's List of Essential Medicines. Loratadine is available as a generic medication. In the United States, it is available over the counter. In 2023, it was the 105th most commonly prescribed medication in the United States, with more than 6 million prescriptions; and the combination with pseudoephedrine was the 300th most commonly prescribed medication in the United States, with more than 400,000 prescriptions.

== Medical uses ==
Loratadine is indicated for the symptomatic relief of allergies such as hay fever (allergic rhinitis), urticaria (hives), chronic idiopathic urticaria, and other skin allergies. For allergic rhinitis, loratadine is indicated for both nasal and eye symptoms including sneezing, runny nose, and itchy or burning eyes.

Similarly to cetirizine, loratadine attenuates the itching associated with Kimura's disease.

=== Combination drugs ===
Loratadine/pseudoephedrine is a fixed dose combination of the drug with pseudoephedrine, a nasal decongestant.

=== Dosage forms ===
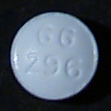
An example of a loratadine 10-mg tablet

The medication is available in many different forms, including tablets, oral suspension, and syrups. Also available are quick-dissolving tablets.

== Contraindications ==
Loratadine is usually compatible with breastfeeding (classified category L-2 - probably compatible, by the American Academy of Pediatrics). In the U.S., it is classified as category B in pregnancy, meaning animal reproduction studies have failed to demonstrate a risk to the fetus, but no adequate and well-controlled studies in pregnant women have been conducted.

== Adverse effects ==
As a "non-sedating" antihistamine, loratadine causes less (but still significant, in some cases) sedation and psychomotor retardation than the older antihistamines, because it penetrates the blood/brain barrier less. Headache is also a possible side effect.

Unlike earlier-generation antihistamines, loratadine is considered largely free of antimuscarinic effects (urinary retention, dry mouth, blurred vision).

== Interactions ==
Substances that act as inhibitors of the CYP3A4 enzyme such as ketoconazole, erythromycin, cimetidine, and furanocoumarin derivatives (found in grapefruit) lead to increased plasma levels of loratadine — that is, more of the drug was present in the bloodstream than typical for a dose. This did not have clinically significant effects in controlled trials of 10 mg loratadine treatment (as opposed to the same studies with Terfenadine (Seldane)). That is, while the drug levels increased, it did not prolong the QTc interval which can lead to the potentially fatal dysrhythmia known as Torsades de Point.

Antihistamines should be discontinued 48 hours before skin allergy tests, since these drugs may prevent or diminish otherwise positive reactions to dermal activity indicators.

== Pharmacology ==
=== Pharmacodynamics ===
Loratadine is a tricyclic antihistamine, which acts as a selective inverse agonist of peripheral histamine H_{1} receptors. The potency of second generation histamine antagonists is (from strongest to weakest) desloratadine (K_{i} 0.4 nM) > levocetirizine (K_{i} 3 nM) > cetirizine (K_{i} 6 nM) > fexofenadine (K_{i} 10 nM) > terfenadine > loratadine. However, the onset of action varies significantly and clinical efficacy is not always directly related to only the H_{1} receptor potency, as the concentration of free drug at the receptor must also be considered. Loratadine also shows anti-inflammatory properties independent of H_{1} receptors. The effect is exhibited through suppression of the NF-κB pathway, and by regulating the release of cytokines and chemokines, thereby regulating the recruitment of inflammatory cells.

=== Pharmacokinetics ===
Loratadine when given orally, is well absorbed from the gastrointestinal tract, and has rapid first-pass hepatic metabolism; it is metabolized by isoenzymes of the cytochrome P450 system, including CYP3A4, CYP2D6, and, to a lesser extent, several others. Loratadine is almost totally (97–99%) bound to plasma proteins. Its metabolite desloratadine, which is largely responsible for the antihistaminergic effects, binds to plasma proteins by 73–76%.

Loratadine's peak effect occurs after 1–2 hours, and its biological half life is on average eight hours (range 3 to 20 hours) with desloratadine's half-life being 27 hours (range 9 to 92 hours), accounting for its long-lasting effect. About 40% is excreted as conjugated metabolites into the urine, and a similar amount is excreted into the feces. Traces of unmetabolised loratadine can be found in the urine.

In structure, it is closely related to tricyclic antidepressants, such as imipramine, and is distantly related to the atypical antipsychotic quetiapine.

== History ==
Schering-Plough developed loratadine as part of a quest for a potential blockbuster drug: a nonsedating antihistamine. By the time Schering submitted the drug to the U.S. Food and Drug Administration (FDA) for approval, the agency had already approved a competitor's nonsedating antihistamine, terfenadine (trade name Seldane), and, therefore, put loratadine on a lower priority. However, terfenadine had to be removed from the U.S. market by the manufacturer in late 1997 after reports of serious ventricular arrhythmias among those taking the drug.

Loratadine was approved by the FDA in 1993. The drug continued to be available only by prescription in the U.S. until it went off patent in 2002. It was then subsequently approved for over-the-counter sales. Once it became an unpatented over-the-counter drug, the price dropped significantly.

Schering also developed desloratadine (Clarinex/Aerius), which is an active metabolite of loratadine.

== Society and culture ==
=== Over the counter ===
In 1998, in an unprecedented action in the United States, an American insurance company, Anthem Inc., petitioned the federal Food and Drug Administration to allow loratadine and two other antihistamines to be made available over the counter (OTC) while they were still protected by patents; the administration granted the request, which was not binding on manufacturers. In the United States, Schering-Plough made loratadine available over the counter in 2002. By 2015, loratadine was available over the counter in many countries.

=== Brands ===
In 2017, loratadine was available under many brand names and in many forms worldwide, including several combination drug formulations with pseudoephedrine, paracetamol, betamethasone, ambroxol, salbutamol, phenylephrine, and dexamethasone.

=== Marketing ===
The marketing of the Claritin brand is important in the history of direct-to-consumer advertising of drugs.

The first television commercial for a prescription drug was broadcast in the United States in 1983, by Boots. It caused controversy. The federal Food and Drug Administration responded with strong regulations requiring disclosure of side effects and other information. These rules made pharmaceutical manufacturers balk at spending money on ads that had to highlight negative aspects.

In the mid-1990s, the marketing team for Claritin at Schering-Plough found a way around these rules. They created brand awareness commercials that never actually said what the drug was for, but instead showed sunny images, and the voiceover said such things as "At last, a clear day is here" and "It's time for Claritin" and repeatedly told viewers "Ask your doctor [about Claritin]." The first ads made people aware of the brand and increased prescriptions, which led Schering-Plough and others to aggressively pursue the advertising strategy.

In 1998, a 12-page one-shot comic based on the Batman: The Animated Series was given away to advertise Claritin. The book, written by PRIEST, penciled by Joe Staton, and inked by Mike DeCarlo, sees Tim Drake unable to perform his crime-fighting duties because hay fever and antihistamines make him drowsy. After being given a prescription for Claritin, he saved Batman from Poison Ivy.

This trend, along with advice from the Food and Drug Administration's attorneys that it could not win a First Amendment case on the issue, prompted the administration to issue new rules for television commercials in 1997. Instead of including the "brief summary" that took up a full page in magazine ads and would take too long to explain in a short television advertisement, drug makers were allowed to refer viewers to print ads, informative telephone lines, and websites, and to urge people to talk to their doctors if they wanted additional information.

Schering-Plough invested US$322 million in Claritin direct-to-consumer advertising in 1998 and 1999, far more than any other brand. Spending on direct-to-consumer advertising by the pharmaceutical industry rose from US$360 million in 1995 to US$1.3 billion in 1998, and by 2006, was US$5 billion.
