= National Precursor Log Exchange =

Real-time electronic logging system

The National Precursor Log Exchange (NPLEx) is a real-time electronic logging system which tracks sales of the methamphetamine precursors ephedrine and pseudoephedrine in the United States. The program is operated by the National Association of Drug Diversion Investigators (NADDI), funded by manufacturers of pseudoephedrine medicine, and technology provided through contract by Apriss Inc. As of January 2014, 29 states have passed NPLEx-related legislation, and it is implemented in most other states on a voluntary basis by national retail chains.

Whenever an individual purchases a precursor medicine from a participating retailer, identifying information is gathered at the point of sale and submitted to NPLEx. The system cross-references the sale to other purchases made by that individual to determine whether that person has purchased in excess of daily and monthly legal quantities. The sale may optionally be blocked, and the record is made available to law enforcement over the Internet.

== Criticism ==
Multiple law enforcement agencies have reported that the system is not effective at stopping meth production. The system is vulnerable to "smurfing", a practice where multiple individuals work together by each buying a legal quantity of precursors and pooling them. The blurring of the responsibilities of government and private business has been called into question, as well as privacy concerns arising from the accuracy and retention of records.
