= List of deaths from drug overdose and intoxication =

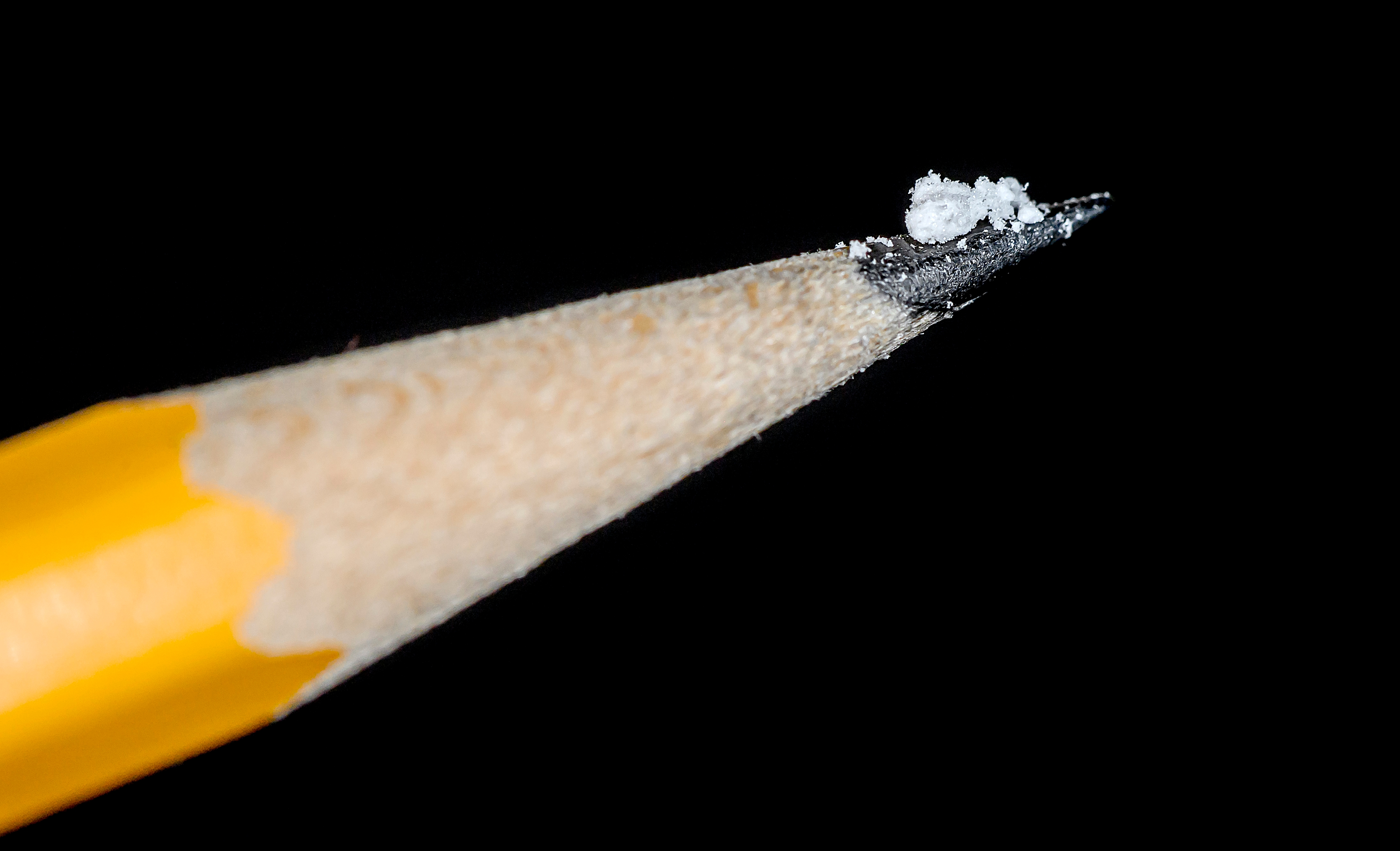
A two milligram dose of fentanyl powder (on pencil tip) is a lethal amount for most people.

Drug overdose and intoxication are significant causes of accidental death and can also be used as a form of suicide. Death can occur from overdosing on a single or multiple drugs, or from combined drug intoxication (CDI) due to poly drug use. Poly drug use often carries more risk than use of a single drug, due to an increase in side effects, and drug synergy. For example, the chance of death from overdosing on opiates is greatly increased when they are consumed in conjunction with alcohol. While they are two distinct phenomena, deaths from CDI are often misreported as overdoses. Drug overdoses and intoxication can also cause indirect deaths. For example, while marijuana does not cause fatal overdoses, being intoxicated by it can increase the chance of fatal traffic collisions.

Drug use and overdoses increased significantly in the 1800s due to the commercialization and availability of certain drugs. For example, while opium and coca had been used for centuries, their active ingredients, morphine and the cocaine alkaloid, were not isolated until 1803 and 1855 respectively. Cocaine and various opiates were subsequently mass-produced and sold openly and legally in the Western world, resulting in widespread misuse and addiction. Drug use and addiction also increased significantly following the invention of the hypodermic syringe in 1853, with overdose being a leading cause of death among intravenous drug users.

Efforts to prohibit various drugs began to be enacted in the early 20th century, though the effectiveness of such policies is debated. Deaths from drug overdoses are increasing. Between 2000 and 2014, fatal overdoses rose 137% in the United States, causing nearly half a million deaths in that period, and have also been continually increasing in Australia, Scotland, England, and Wales. While prohibited drugs are generally viewed as being the most dangerous, the misuse of prescription drugs is linked to more deaths in several countries. Cocaine and heroin combined caused fewer deaths than prescriptions drugs in the United Kingdom in 2013, and fewer deaths than prescription opiates alone in the United States in 2008. As of 2016, benzodiazepines were most likely to cause fatal overdose in Australia, with diazepam (Valium) being the drug most responsible. While fatal overdoses are highly associated with drugs such as opiates, cocaine and alcohol, deaths from other drugs such as caffeine are extremely rare.

This alphabetical list contains 652 people whose deaths can be reliably sourced to be the result of drug overdose or acute drug intoxication. Where sources indicate drug overdose or intoxication was only suspected to be the cause of death, this will be specified in the 'notes' column. Where sources are able to indicate, deaths are specified as 'suicide', 'accidental', 'undetermined', or otherwise in the 'cause' column. Where sources do not explicitly state intent, they will be listed in this column as 'unknown'. Deaths from accidents or misadventure caused by drug overdoses or intoxication are also included on this list. Deaths from long-term effects of drugs, such as tobacco-related cancers and cirrhosis from alcohol, are not included, nor are deaths from lethal injection or legal euthanasia.

== Deaths ==
List of deaths from drug overdose and intoxication
Name	Born	Died	Age	Profession	Drug(s)	Manner	Notes	Ref.
Louis Abolafia	1941	1995	54	Artist	Unspecified	Unknown		
Herb Abrams	1955	1996	41	Wrestling promoter	Cocaine	Accidental	Drug-induced heart attack	
Janet Achurch	1864	1916	52	Actress	Morphine	Unknown		
Trent Acid	1980	2010	29	Wrestler	Unspecified	Unknown		
Arthur Adamov	1908	1970	61	Playwright	Barbiturates	Accidental		
Brian Adams	1964	2007	43	Wrestler	Unspecified painkillers	Accidental		
Nick Adams	1931	1968	36	Actor	Paraldehyde and promazine	Unknown		
Ai Xia	1912	1934	21	Actress	Opium	Suicide		
Ryūnosuke Akutagawa	1892	1927	35	Writer	Barbital	Suicide		
Michael Alig	1966	2020	54	Club promoter	Heroin	Accidental		
Lexii Alijai	1998	2020	21	Rapper	Fentanyl and alcohol	Unknown		
Howard Alk	1930	1982	51	Filmmaker	Heroin	Accidental	Officially accidental though speculated suicide	
A. A. Allen	1911	1970	59	Evangelist	Alcohol	Unknown		
Chet Allen	1939	1984	45	Child actor	Antidepressants	Suicide		
William Barnsley Allen	1892	1933	41	Army officer	Unspecified narcotic	Accidental		
GG Allin	1956	1993	36	Musician	Heroin	Unknown		
Frances Alsop	1782	1821	38	Actress	Laudanum	Accidental		
Abraham Ángel	1905	1924	19	Artist	Cocaine	Accidental		
Pier Angeli	1932	1971	39	Actress	Barbiturates	Accidental		
Bridgette Andersen	1975	1997	21	Child actress	Heroin	Unknown		
Paul Y. Anderson	1893	1938	45	Journalist	Sleeping pills	Unknown		
Chris Antley	1966	2000	34	Jockey	Methamphetamine	Blunt trauma	The coroner's report concluded that Antley's injuries were likely related to a fall caused by the overdose	
Jean Améry	1912	1978	65	Writer	Sleeping pills	Suicide		
Diane Arbus	1923	1971	48	Photographer	Barbiturates	Suicide	Arbus also slit her wrists	
Reinaldo Arenas	1943	1990	47	Poet	Unspecified	Suicide		
West Arkeen	1960	1997	36	Musician	Opiates	Accidental		
Howard Arkley	1951	1999	48	Painter	Heroin	Accidental		
James Lloyd Ashbury	1834	1895	60–61	Yachtsman	Chlorodyne	Suicide	Suspected overdose	
Avery Atkins	1987	2007	20	American football player	MDMA	Unknown		
Kevyn Aucoin	1962	2002	40	Photographer, make-up artist	Unspecified painkillers	Accidental	Aucoin's addiction to painkillers, which were prescribed, caused kidney and liver failure due to paracetamol toxicity	
Kathy Augustine	1956	2006	50	Politician	Succinylcholine	Murder		
Chet Baker	1929	1988	58	Musician	Cocaine and heroin	Accidental	Baker fell from a balcony while intoxicated	
Tom Baker	1940	1982	42	Actor	Heroin	Unknown		
Albert Ballin	1857	1918	61	Shipping magnate	Sleeping pills	Suicide		
Lester Bangs	1948	1982	33	Music critic, musician	Multiple	Unknown	Dextropropoxyphene, diazepam and NyQuil	
Barbette	1899	1973	74	Trapeze artist	Methamphetamines	Unknown		
R. H. Barlow	1918	1951	32	Author	Barbiturates	Suicide		
Sid Barnes	1916	1973	57	Cricketer	Barbiturates and bromide	Undetermined		
Jürgen Bartsch	1946	1976	29	Serial killer	Halothane	Accidental	Accidental overdose administered by nurse	
Skye McCole Bartusiak	1992	2014	21	Actress	Multiple	Accidental	Hydrocodone, difluoroethane and carisoprodol	
Jean-Michel Basquiat	1960	1988	27	Painter	Heroin	Unknown		
Pierre Batcheff	1901	1932	30	Actor	Barbital	Suicide		
Michael Carl Baze	1987	2011	24	Jockey	Cocaine and oxymorphone	Accidental		
Patricia Beck	1924	1978	53	Writer	Insulin	Suicide		
Scotty Beckett	1929	1968	38	Child actor	Barbiturates	Unknown		
Steve Bechler	1979	2003	23	Baseball pitcher	Ephedra	Heatstroke	The coroner stated the toxicity of ephedra played a significant role in his death	
Art Bell	1945	2018	72	Radio host	Multiple	Accidental	Bell's death was a combination of oxycodone, hydrocodone, diazepam, and carisoprodol, complicated by chronic obstructive pulmonary disease and high blood pressure	
Gertrude Bell	1868	1926	57	Writer	Sleeping pills	Unknown		
John Belushi	1949	1982	33	Actor	Speedball	Accidental		
Walter Benjamin	1892	1940	48	Philosopher	Morphine	Suicide		
Jay Bennett	1963	2009	45	Musician	Fentanyl	Accidental		
Jill Bennett	1926	1990	63	Actress	Unspecified	Unknown		
Wes Berggren	1971	1999	28	Musician	Multiple	Unknown	Benzodiazepines, cocaine and propoxyphene	
William Lee Bergstrom	1951	1985	33	Gambler	Unspecified	Suicide		
Bruce Berry	1950	1973	22	Roadie	Cocaine and heroin	Unknown		
Don Bessent	1931	1990	59	Baseball pitcher	Alcohol	Unknown		
Leah Betts	1977	1995	18	Student	MDMA	Water intoxication	Died from water intoxication secondary to use of MDMA	
Len Bias	1963	1986	22	Basketball player	Cocaine	Accidental		
Big George	1957	2011	53	Presenter, broadcaster	Mephedrone	Unknown	Drug-induced heart attack.	
Big Moe	1974	2007	33	Musician	Unspecified	Unknown	Drug-induced heart attack	
Bam Bam Bigelow	1961	2007	45	Wrestler	Cocaine	Unknown	Other unspecified drugs were involved	
Robert Bingham	1966	1999	33	Writer	Heroin	Unknown		
Ted Binion	1943	1998	54	Gambling executive	Alprazolam and heroin	Suicide (suspected)		
Laurie Bird	1953	1979	26	Actress	Diazepam	Suicide		
Gottfried von Bismarck	1962	2007	44	Aristocrat	Cocaine and morphine	Unknown		
Patrick Bissell	1957	1987	30	Ballet dancer	Multiple	Unknown	Cocaine, codeine, methadone and other unspecified drugs	
Clara Blandick	1876	1962	85	Actress	Sleeping pills	Suicide	Drug-induced asphyxiation	
Erica Blasberg	1984	2010	25	Golfer	Multiple	Suicide	Drug-induced asphyxiation caused by butalbital, temazepam, alprazolam, codeine, hydrocodone and tramadol	
Mattie Blaylock	1850	1888	38	Prostitute	Opiates	Suicide		
Mike Bloomfield	1943	1981	37	Musician	Cocaine and methamphetamine	Unknown		
Tommy Bolin	1951	1976	25	Musician	Unspecified	Unknown		
John Bonham	1948	1980	32	Musician	Alcohol	Unknown	Bonham choked on his own vomit while intoxicated	
Stephan Bonnar	1977	2022	45	Mixed martial artist	Fentanyl	Accidental		
Derek Boogaard	1982	2011	28	Ice hockey player	Oxycodone and alcohol	Accidental		
Jennie Bosschieter	1882	1900	18	Factory worker	Chloral hydrate	Murder		
Christopher Bowman	1967	2008	40	Ice skater	Multiple	Accidental	Cocaine, diazepam, alcohol and cannabis	
Charles Boyer	1899	1978	78	Actor	Barbiturates	Suicide		
Billy Lee Brammer	1929	1978	48	Author	Methamphetamines	Unknown		
Elisa Bridges	1973	2002	28	Model	Multiple	Unknown	Heroin, methamphetamines, meperidine and alprazolam	
Diane Brimble	1960	2002	42	Mother	Gamma-Hydroxybutyric acid and alcohol	Unknown		
William Brinkley	1917	1993	76	Writer	Barbiturates	Suicide		
Dave Brockie	1963	2014	50	Musician	Heroin	Unknown		
Branwell Brontë	1817	1848	31	Painter, writer	Opiates	Unknown	Died of drug-aggravated tuberculosis	
Bobbi Kristina Brown	1993	2015	22	Media personality	Multiple	Unknown	Drowned while intoxicated by marijuana, alcohol and an unspecified anti-anxiety medication	
Lenny Bruce	1925	1966	40	Comedian	Morphine	Accidental		
Patrick Henry Bruce	1881	1936	55	Painter	Barbital	Suicide		
Julia Bruns	1895	1927	32	Actress	Alcohol	Accidental		
Tim Buckley	1947	1975	28	Musician	Multiple	Unknown	Heroin, morphine and alcohol	
Sean Burroughs	1980	2024	43	Baseball player	Fentanyl	Accidental		
Paul Butterfield	1942	1987	44	Musician	Unspecified	Unknown	Drug-induced heart failure	
Andrés Caicedo	1951	1977	25	Writer	Secobarbital	Suicide		
Ken Caminiti	1963	2004	41	Baseball player	Cocaine and opiates	Accidental		
Max Cantor	1959	1991	32	Actor, journalist	Heroin	Unknown		
Truman Capote	1924	1984	59	Writer	Multiple	Unknown	Cause of death was liver disease complicated by phlebitis and multiple drug intoxication	
Billie Carleton	1896	1918	22	Actress	Cocaine	Accidental	Suspected overdose	
Edward John Carnell	1919	1967	47	Pastor	Barbiturates	Unknown	Suspected overdose	
Aaron Carter	1987	2022	34	Singer	Difluoroethane and alprazolam	Accidental	Carter drowned in the bath after inhaling the drugs	
Leslie Carter	1986	2012	25	Singer	Multiple	Unknown	Olanzapine, cyclobenzaprine and alprazolam	
Greg Centauro	1977	2011	34	Pornographic actor	Unspecified	Unknown		
Spencer Charters	1875	1943	67	Actor	Sleeping pills	Suicide		
Richard Chase	1950	1980	30	Serial killer	Unspecified	Unknown		
Vic Chesnutt	1964	2009	45	Musician	Unspecified muscle relaxant	Suicide		
Tai Chi-tao	1891	1949	58	Journalist	Sleeping pills	Suicide (suspected)		
Diana Churchill	1909	1963	54	Naval officer	Barbiturates	Suicide		
Sally Clark	1964	2007	42	Solicitor	Alcohol	Unknown		
Sonny Clark	1931	1963	31	Pianist	Heroin	Unknown		
Steve Clark	1960	1991	30	Musician	Multiple	Accidental	Codeine, diazepam, morphine and alcohol	
Brandon Clarke	1996	2026	29	Basketball player	Cocaine and heroin	Accidental		
Charmian Clift	1923	1969	45	Writer	Unspecified	Suicide		
Angus Cloud	1998	2023	25	Actor	Multiple	Accidental	Methamphetamine, cocaine, fentanyl and benzodiazepines	
Bob Collins	1946	2007	61	Politician	Unspecified prescription drugs and alcohol	Suicide		
Natasha Collins	1976	2008	31	Actress	Cocaine	Accidental		
Brian Cole	1942	1972	29	Musician	Heroin	Unknown		
Coolio	1963	2022	59	Rapper	Multiple	Accidental	Fentanyl, heroin, and methamphetamine	
Elizabeth Cooper	1914	1960	46	Actress	Barbiturates	Suicide		
Michael Cooper	1941	1973	31	Photographer	Heroin	Unknown		
Megan Connolly	1974	2001	27	Actress	Heroin	Unknown		
Sean Costello	1979	2008	28	Musician	Multiple	Unknown	Heroin, chlordiazepoxide, ephedrine and amphetamine	
Pamela Courson	1946	1974	27	Boutique manager	Heroin	Unknown		
Carl Crack	1971	2001	30	Musician	Unspecified pills and alcohol	Unknown		
Ed Crane	1862	1896	34	Baseball player	Chloral hydrate	Suicide (suspected)		
Darby Crash	1958	1980	22	Musician	Heroin	Suicide		
Nicholas C. Creede	1843	1897	53–54	Prospector	Morphine	Accidental		
Tim Crews	1961	1993	31	Baseball pitcher	Alcohol	Accidental	Crews was legally drunk when he crashed a boat, killing himself and Steve Olin	
Stephen Crohn	1946	2013	66	Chef	Benzodiazepine and oxycodone	Suicide		
David Croudip	1958	1988	30	American football player	Cocaine	Unknown		
Robbin Crosby	1959	2002	42	Musician	Heroin	Unknown		
Isaac Cruikshank	1764	1811	46–47	Painter	Alcohol	Unknown		
Bartley Crum	1900	1959	59	Lawyer	Secobarbital and alcohol	Suicide		
Will Cuppy	1884	1949	65	Literary critic	Sleeping pills	Suicide		
Jackie Curtis	1947	1985	38	Actor	Heroin	Unknown		
Patricia Cutts	1926	1974	48	Actress	Barbiturates	Suicide		
Chyna	1969	2016	46	Wrestler	Multiple	Accidental	Oxymorphone, oxycodone, temazepam, diazepam, and alcohol	
Lin Dai	1934	1964	29	Actress	Sleeping pills	Unknown		
Jacques d'Adelswärd-Fersen	1880	1923	43	Writer	Cocaine and alcohol	Unknown		
Dalida	1933	1987	54	Singer	Barbiturates	Suicide		
Jacques Damala	1855	1889	34	Actor	Cocaine and morphine	Unknown		
Dorothy Dandridge	1922	1965	42	Actress, singer	Imipramine	Accidental		
Mike Darr	1976	2002	25	Baseball player	Alcohol	Accidental	Motor-vehicle collision while intoxicated	
Jason Davis	1984	2020	35	Actor	Fentanyl	Accidental		
Jesse Ed Davis	1944	1988	43	Musician	Heroin	Unknown		
Elmyr de Hory	1906	1976	70	Art forger	Barbiturates	Suicide (suspected)		
Ed Delahanty	1867	1903	35	Baseball player	Alcohol	Unknown	Delahanty was intoxicated when he drowned in the Niagara River.	
Anestis Delias	1912	1944	31–32	Musician	Heroin	Unknown		
Paul DeMayo	1967	2005	37	Bodybuilder	Heroin	Unknown		
Ted Demme	1963	2002	38	Director	Cocaine	Accidental	Suspected drug-induced heart attack	
René-Thierry Magon de la Villehuchet	1943	2008	65	Businessman	Sleeping pills	Suicide		
Edwin Denby	1903	1983	80	Poet	Sleeping pills	Unknown		
Margaret De Patta	1903	1964	60	Jewelry designer	Unspecified pills	Suicide		
Patterson Dial	1902	1945	42	Writer, actress	Barbiturates	Unknown		
Philip Dimmitt	1801	1841	39–40	Texian Army officer	Morphine	Suicide		
DJ Screw	1971	2000	29	Disc jockey	Codeine	Accidental		
DMX	1970	2021	50	Rapper	Cocaine	Unknown	Drug-induced heart attack	
Jimmy Donahue	1915	1966	51	Socialite	Alcohol and barbiturates	Accidental	Possible suicide	
Desmond Donnelly	1920	1974	53	Politician	Barbiturates and alcohol	Suicide		
Michael Dorris	1945	1997	52	Writer	Unspecified drugs and alcohol	Suicide		
Tommy Dorsey	1905	1956	51	Musician	Sleeping pills	Accidental	Choked to death while intoxicated	
Eric Douglas	1958	2004	46	Comedian	Multiple	Unknown	Unspecified tranquilizers, painkillers and alcohol	
Nick Drake	1948	1974	26	Musician	Antidepressants	Suicide (suspected)		
Jonathan Drummond-Webb	1959	2004	45	Pediatric heart surgeon	Unspecified prescription drugs	Suicide		
Kevin DuBrow	1955	2007	52	Singer	Cocaine	Accidental		
Bobby Duncum Jr.	1965	2000	34	Wrestler	Unspecified painkillers and alcohol	Unknown		
Kenne Duncan	1903	1972	68	Actor	Barbiturates	Suicide		
Theresa Duncan	1966	2007	40	Video game designer	Paracetamol and alcohol	Suicide		
Ryan Dunn	1977	2011	34	Actor, stunt man	Alcohol	Accidental	Motor-vehicle collision while intoxicated	
Anthony Durante	1967	2003	36	Wrestler	Fentanyl	Unknown		
Buddy Duress	1985	2023	38	Actor	Unspecified	Unknown	Cardiac arrest from a drug cocktail	
Guru Dutt	1925	1964	39	Actor	Sleeping pills and alcohol	Unknown		
John Dye	1963	2011	47	Actor	Methamphetamines	Accidental		
Jeanne Eagels	1890	1929	39	Actress	Chloral hydrate	Unknown		
Justin Townes Earle	1982	2020	38	Singer-songwriter	Fentanyl and cocaine	Accidental		
Jamal Edwards	1990	2022	31	Entrepreneur and DJ	Cocaine	Cardiac arrhythmia		
Bernie Elsey	1906	1986	79–80	Property developer	Unspecified	Suicide		
John Entwistle	1944	2002	57	Musician	Cocaine	Accidental	Drug-induced heart attack	
Brian Epstein	1934	1967	32	Music entrepreneur	Sleeping pills	Accidental		
Howie Epstein	1955	2003	47	Musician	Heroin and unspecified prescription drugs	Unknown	Suspected overdose	
Paul Epstein	1871	1939	68	Mathematician	Barbital	Suicide		
Blanca Errázuriz	1894	1940	45	Socialite	Barbiturates	Suicide		
Austin Eubanks	1981	2019	37	Motivational speaker	Heroin	Accidental		
Eyedea	1981	2010	28	Musician	Unspecified	Accidental		
Chris Farley	1964	1997	33	Actor	Cocaine and morphine	Accidental		
Pete Farndon	1952	1983	30	Musician	Heroin	Unknown	Drowned after overdosing	
Rainer Werner Fassbinder	1945	1982	37	Playwright, director	Barbiturates and cocaine	Unknown		
Brenda Fassie	1964	2004	39	Singer	Cocaine	Unknown		
José Fernández	1992	2016	24	Baseball pitcher	Cocaine and alcohol	Accidental	Fernández was under the influence when he died in a boating accident	
Lolo Ferrari	1963	2000	37	Pornographic actress	Unspecified	Suicide (suspected)	Officially ruled as "most likely suicide", though previously speculated as murder	
Paul Ferris	1941	1995	54	Film composer	Unspecified	Unknown		
Vincent Flemmi	1935	1979	44	Gangster	Unspecified	Unknown		
Antonio Flores	1961	1995	33	Singer, actor	Unspecified	Unknown		
Bernard Floud	1915	1967	52	Politician	Sleeping pills	Unknown	Suspected overdose	
Althea Flynt	1953	1987	33	Co-publisher of Hustler	Heroin	Undetermined	Drowned after overdosing; whether her death was intentional or not was unclear	
Steve Foley	1959	2008	49	Musician	Unspecified	Accidental	Suspected overdose	
Seán Fortune	1954	1999	45	Priest	Unspecified drugs and alcohol	Suicide		
Sidney Fox	1911	1942	30	Actress	Sleeping pills	Suicide (suspected)		
Henry Stephen Fox	1791	1846	55	Diplomat	Unspecified	Unknown		
J. Herbert Frank	1885	1926	40	Actor	Chloroform	Suicide	Frank used a combination of chloroform and natural gas.	
Rosemarie Frankland	1943	2000	57	Actress	Unspecified prescription drugs	Suicide		
Katy French	1983	2007	24	Model, socialite	Cocaine and ephedrine	Accidental	Official cause of death was hypoxic ischemic brain injury caused by cocaine and ephedrine	
Gary Frisch	1969	2007	38	Website founder	Ketamine	Misadventure	Frisch jumped from a balcony while intoxicated	
Gangsta Boo	1979	2023	43	Rapper	Cocaine, alcohol and fentanyl	Accidental		
Danny Gans	1956	2009	52	Impressionist, entertainer	Hydromorphone	Accidental	Gans was killed by a combination of the prescription drug and a pre-existing heart condition	
Paul Gardiner	1958	1984	25	Musician	Heroin	Unknown		
Judy Garland	1922	1969	47	Singer, actress	Secobarbital	Accidental	Officially accidental though speculated suicide	
Paul Gauguin	1848	1903	54	Painter	Morphine	Unknown		
Gidget Gein	1969	2008	39	Musician	Unspecified	Unknown	Suspected overdose	
Peaches Geldof	1989	2014	25	Writer, model	Heroin	Accidental	Overdose due to diminished tolerance after drugs treatment.	
Martha Gellhorn	1908	1998	89	Writer	Cyanide poisoning	Suicide		
Lowell George	1945	1979	34	Musician	Unspecified	Cocaine		
Talitha Getty	1940	1971	30	Actress	Heroin	Unknown		
Harold Gimblett	1914	1978	63	Cricketer	Unspecified	Unknown		
Michèle Girardon	1938	1975	36	Actress	Sleeping pills	Suicide		
Billy Glide	1970	2014	43	Pornographic actor	Alcohol	Accidental	Initially reported as death by snake bite.	
Trevor Goddard	1962	2003	40	Actor	Multiple	Accidental	Heroin, cocaine, diazepam and hydrocodone/paracetamol	
Denis Goodwin	1929	1975	45	Writer	Sleeping pills and alcohol	Unknown		
Greg Giraldo	1965	2010	44	Comedian	Unspecified prescription drugs	Accidental		
Dwayne Goettel	1964	1995	31	Musician	Heroin	Unknown		
Adam Goldstein	1973	2009	36	Disc jockey	Multiple	Accidental	Cocaine, levamisole, oxycodone, hydrocodone, lorazepam, clonazepam, alprazolam and diphenhydramine	
Paul Gray	1972	2010	38	Musician	Fentanyl and morphine	Accidental		
Lucy Grealy	1963	2002	39	Poet	Heroin	Unknown		
William Lindsay Gresham	1909	1962	53	Author	Sleeping pills	Suicide		
Gribouille	1941	1968	26	Singer	Unspecified medication and alcohol	Unknown		
Eddie Griffin	1982	2007	25	Basketball player	Alcohol	Accidental	Motor-vehicle collision while intoxicated	
Emmett Grogan	1942	1978	35	Activist	Heroin	Unknown		
Gustaf Gründgens	1899	1963	63	Actor	Sleeping pills	Suicide (suspected)		
Clinton Haines	1976	1997	21	Computer hacker	Heroin	Accidental		
Kenneth Halliwell	1926	1967	41	Actor	Pentobarbital	Suicide		
Ollie Halsall	1949	1992	43	Musician	Unspecified	Unknown		
Lois Hamilton	1952	1999	47	Model, actress	Unspecified	Unknown		
Marthe Hanau	1890	1935	44–45	Fraudster	Sleeping pills	Unknown		
Tony Hancock	1924	1968	44	Actor	Amphetamines and alcohol	Suicide		
Edward A. Hannegan	1807	1857	51	Senator	Morphine	Unknown		
Tommy Hanson	1986	2015	29	Baseball pitcher	Cocaine and alcohol	Accidental		
Malcolm Hardee	1950	2005	55	Comedian	Alcohol	Accidental	Drowned after he fell into the water while intoxicated	
James Harden-Hickey	1854	1898	43	Author, adventurer	Morphine	Suicide		
Tim Hardin	1941	1980	39	Musician	Heroin	Unknown		
Eric Harroun	1982	2014	31	Free Syrian Army fighter	Heroin and sertraline	Accidental		
Domino Harvey	1969	2005	35	Bounty hunter	Fentanyl	Unknown		
Rodney Harvey	1967	1998	30	Actor, model	Heroin	Unknown		
Walter Hasenclever	1890	1940	49	Poet, playwright	Barbital	Suicide		
Imogen Hassall	1942	1980	38	Actress	Tuinal	Unknown		
Bobby Hatfield	1940	2003	63	Musician	Cocaine	Unknown	Drug-induced heart attack	
James Hatfield	1958	2001	43	Author	Unspecified prescription pills	Suicide		
Felix Hausdorff	1868	1942	73	Mathematician	Barbital	Suicide		
Phyllis Haver	1899	1960	61	Actress	Barbiturates	Suicide (suspected)		
Taylor Hawkins	1972	2022	50	Musician	Multiple	Accidental		
James Hayden	1953	1983	29	Actor	Heroin	Unknown	Suspected overdose	
Ira Hayes	1923	1955	32	United States Marine	Alcohol	Accidental	Hayes was killed by a combination of exposure and intoxication	
Rory Hayes	1949	1983	34	Cartoonist	Multiple	Unknown	Died from polypharmacy of unspecified drugs	
Paul Hayward	1954	1992	38	Rugby league player	Heroin	Unknown		
Mitch Hedberg	1968	2005	37	Comedian	Cocaine and heroin	Unknown		
Thomas Heggen	1918	1949	30	Writer	Barbiturates	Suicide (suspected)		
Tim Hemensley	1972	2003	31	Musician	Heroin	Unknown		
Margaux Hemingway	1954	1996	42	Actress	Phenobarbital	Suicide		
Jimi Hendrix	1942	1970	27	Musician	Barbiturates	Accidental	Hendrix aspirated his own vomit and died of asphyxia while intoxicated	
Curt Hennig	1958	2003	44	Wrestler	Cocaine	Unknown		
Gregory Herbert	1947	1978	30	Musician	Heroin	Suicide		
James Leo Herlihy	1927	1993	66	Novelist, actor	Sleeping pills	Suicide		
Gino Hernandez	1957	1986	28	Wrestler	Unspecified	Unknown		
George Hickenlooper	1963	2010	47	Documentary filmmaker	Oxymorphone and alcohol	Accidental		
Ureli Corelli Hill	1802	1875	72–73	Conductor	Morphine	Suicide		
Virginia Hill	1916	1966	49	Courier	Sleeping pills	Unknown		
Ashihei Hino	1907	1960	49	Soldier, author	Sleeping pills	Suicide		
Arthur Hiscoe	1848	1912	64	Architect	Alcohol	Accidental	Suffocation induced by alcohol poisoning.	
Bob Hite	1943	1981	38	Singer	Heroin	Unknown		
Roger Hobbs	1988	2016	28	Writer	Unspecified	Unknown		
Jane Aiken Hodge	1917	2009	91	Writer	Unspecified	Suicide		
Abbie Hoffman	1936	1989	52	Activist	Phenobarbital	Suicide		
Philip Seymour Hoffman	1967	2014	46	Actor	Multiple	Accidental	Heroin, cocaine, benzodiazepines and amphetamines	
William Holden	1918	1981	63	Actor	Alcohol	Accidental	Holden fell and bled to death while intoxicated	
Michael Holliday	1924	1963	38	Singer	Unspecified	Suicide		
Crash Holly	1971	2003	32	Wrestler	Carisoprodol	Suicide	Suspected overdose	
Hollywood Fats	1954	1986	32	Musician	Heroin	Unknown		
Gary Holton	1952	1985	33	Actor, musician	Heroin	Unknown		
James Honeyman-Scott	1956	1982	25	Musician	Cocaine	Unknown	Drug-induced heart attack	
Shannon Hoon	1967	1995	28	Musician	Cocaine	Unknown		
Russell Hopton	1900	1945	45	Actor	Sleeping pills	Unknown	Suspected overdose	
Paul Horner	1978	2017	39	Comedian	Multiple	Accidental	Clonazepam, diazepam, alcohol and furanylfentanyl	
Sebastian Horsley	1962	2010	47	Artist	Cocaine and heroin	Unknown		
Tim Horton	1930	1974	44	Ice hockey player	Dexamyl and alcohol	Accidental	Motor-vehicle collision while intoxicated	
Whitney Houston	1963	2012	48	Singer, actress	Cocaine	Accidental	Houston drowned, with heart disease and cocaine listed as contributing factors	
Tim Hovey	1945	1989	44	Child actor	Unspecified	Unknown		
Andrée Howard	1910	1968	57	Ballet dancer	Unspecified	Unknown	Suspected overdose	
Dick Howard	1935	1967	32	Athlete	Heroin	Unknown		
Lisa Howard	1930	1965	35	Reporter	Phenobarbital	Suicide	Officially suicide though speculated as murder	
Howard Hughes	1905	1976	70	Aviator, businessman	Codeine	Unknown	Hughes died of liver failure after his physician administered an overdose of codeine	
Mark R. Hughes	1956	2000	44	Businessman	Doxepin and alcohol	Accidental		
Gertrude Hullett	1906	1956	49–50	Wife	Sodium barbital	Suicide	Officially ruled as suicide by an inquest which received criticism; John Bodkin Adams was charged with her murder, though never tried for it	
Harold Hunter	1974	2006	31	Skateboarder, actor	Cocaine	Unknown	Drug-induced heart attack	
Leona Hutton	1892	1949	56	Actress	Codeine	Unknown		
Phyllis Hyman	1949	1995	45	Singer	Pentobarbital and secobarbital	Suicide		
Fanny Imlay	1794	1816	22	Wife	Laudanum	Suicide		
Andy Irons	1978	2010	32	Surfer	Multiple	Unknown	Died from cardiac arrest, with secondary cause of death as acute mixed drug ingestion of cocaine, methamphetamines, alprazolam and methadone	
Bruce Edwards Ivins	1946	2008	62	Microbiologist	Paracetamol	Suicide		
Barnaby Jack	1977	2013	35	Hacker, security expert	Multiple	Unknown	Cocaine, heroin and other unspecified drugs	
Charles R. Jackson	1903	1968	65	Author	Barbiturates	Suicide		
Jennifer Lyn Jackson	1969	2010	40	Playboy Playmate	Heroin	Unknown	Suspected overdose	
Michael Jackson	1958	2009	50	Singer	Lorazepam and propofol	Involuntary manslaughter	Jackson was killed by an accidental overdose administered by his physician	
Peter Jackson	1964	1997	33	Rugby league player	Heroin	Unknown		
Steve Jagielka	1978	2021	43	Football player	Methadone	Unknown	"Moderate" levels of cocaine were also present	
Joyce Jameson	1932	1987	54	Actress	Unspecified	Suicide		
Jimi Jamison	1951	2014	63	Musician	Methamphetamine	Unknown	"Acute methamphetamine intoxication" was a contributing factor	
Tom Jans	1948	1984	36	Singer	Unspecified	Unknown	Suspected overdose	
Jóhann Jóhannsson	1969	2018	48	Artist	Cocaine and cold medicine	Unknown	The "likely cause of death" was found to be a combination of the two drugs	
Dean Johnson	1961	2007	46	Entertainer	Oxycodone	Unknown		
Randy Johnston	1988	2008	20	Model	Unspecified	Accidental		
Ragnhild Jølsen	1875	1908	32	Author	Morphine	Suicide		
Anissa Jones	1958	1976	18	Actress	Methaqualone and alcohol	Accidental		
Chloe Jones	1975	2005	29	Pornographic actress	Unspecified prescription drugs	Accidental		
Rob Jones	1964	1993	29	Musician	Heart attack	Suspected to have been caused by a heroin overdose		
Janis Joplin	1943	1970	27	Musician	Heroin	Accidental		
Juice WRLD	1998	2019	21	Rapper	Oxycodone and codeine	Accidental	Official cause of death was seizures induced by acute oxycodone and codeine intoxication	
Kazuo Kageyama	1927	1965	38	Baseball player	Sleeping pills	Unknown		
Frida Kahlo	1907	1954	47	Artist	Opiates	Suicide (suspected)	Official cause of death was pulmonary embolism, though no autopsy was performed; modern biographers believe that she committed suicide with opiates	
Tay Keith	1999	2026	29	Rapper	Ketamine and mitragynine	Accident		
John Kahn	1947	1996	48	Musician	Heroin	Unknown		
Chris Kanyon	1970	2010	40	Wrestler	Unspecified pills	Suicide		
Lisa Robin Kelly	1970	2013	43	Actress	Multiple	Accidental	Combined drug intoxication of unspecified drugs	
Beverly Kenney	1932	1960	28	Singer	Secobarbital and alcohol	Suicide		
Bernard Kettlewell	1907	1979	72	Lepidopterist, medical doctor	Unspecified	Accidental		
David Kelly	1944	2003	59	Weapons expert	Dextropropoxyphene	Suicide	Evidence indicated Kelly consumed 29 dextropropoxyphene pills	
Dorothy Kilgallen	1913	1965	52	Journalist	Barbiturates and ethannol	Unknown		
Margot Kidder	1948	2018	69	Actress	Unspecified painkillers and alcohol	Suicide		
Rodney King	1965	2012	47	Taxi driver	Multiple	Accidental	Drowned due to the combined effects of a heart condition, alongside alcohol, cocaine, marijuana and phencyclidine intoxication	
Thomas Kinkade	1958	2012	54	Painter	Diazepam and alcohol	Unknown		
Ben Klassen	1918	1993	75	Founder of Creativity	Sleeping pills	Suicide		
Fletcher Knebel	1911	1993	81	Author	Sleeping pills	Suicide		
Arthur Koestler	1905	1983	77	Author	Tuinal and alcohol	Suicide		
Hannelore Kohl	1933	2001	68	Wife	Unspecified painkillers and sleeping pills	Suicide		
John Kordic	1965	1992	27	Ice hockey player	Unspecified	Unknown		
Joey Kovar	1983	2012	29	Reality TV star	Opiates	Unknown		
Seymour Krim	1922	1989	67	Writer	Unspecified	Unknown		
Deborah Laake	1953	2000	47	Writer	Unspecified pills	Suicide		
Alan Ladd	1913	1964	50	Actor	Unspecified drugs and alcohol	Accidental		
Karen Lancaume	1973	2005	32	Pornographic actress	Temazepam	Suicide		
Carole Landis	1919	1948	29	Actress	Secobarbital	Suicide		
Jani Lane	1964	2011	47	Singer	Alcohol	Unknown		
Guttman Landau	c. 1877	1942	63–65	Community leader	Morphine	Unknown		
Heath Ledger	1979	2008	28	Actor	Multiple	Accidental	Oxycodone, hydrocodone, alprazolam, diazepam, temazepam and doxylamine	
David Lerner	1951	1997	45	Poet	Unspecified	Unknown		
Gerald Levert	1966	2006	40	Singer	Multiple	Accidental	Oxycodone/paracetamol, hydrocodone/paracetamol, dextropropoxyphene, alprazolam and two antihistamines	
Ronald Lewis	1928	1982	53	Actor	Sleeping pills	Unknown		
Rudy Lewis	1936	1964	27	Singer	Unspecified	Disputed	Some sources state he died from an unspecified drug overdose while others state he choked	
Frank Xavier Leyendecker	1877	1924	48	Illustrator	Unspecified	Suicide	Suspected only	
Lil Peep	1996	2017	21	Musician	Fentanyl and Xanax	Accidental	Hydrocodone, Hydromorphone (Dilaudid), Oxycodone and Oxymorphone	
Debbie Linden	1961	1997	36	Model, actress	Heroin	Unknown		
Max Linder	1883	1925	41	Actor	Barbital and morphine	Suicide	Linder and his wife both took the drugs then cut open veins in their arms	
Ruan Lingyu	1910	1935	24	Actress	Sleeping pills	Disputed suicide		
Gene Lipscomb	1931	1963	31	American football player	Heroin	Unknown		
Athina Livanos	1929	1974	45	Socialite	Barbiturates	Undetermined		
Eugenia Livanos	1927	1970	42–43	Wife	Barbiturates	Unknown		
Kevin Lloyd	1949	1998	49	Actor	Alcohol	Accidental	Lloyd was heavily intoxicated when he choked on his own vomit	
David Lochary	1944	1977	32	Actor	Phencyclidine	Unknown	Lochary bled to death while intoxicated	
Philip Loeb	1891	1955	64	Actor	Sleeping pills	Suicide	Suspected overdose	
Malcolm Lowry	1909	1957	47	Poet, novelist	Barbiturates and alcohol	Suicide (suspected)		
Zoë Lund	1962	1999	37	Model, actress	Unspecified	Unknown		
Donyale Luna	1945	1979	33	Model, actress	Heroin	Accidental		
Frankie Lymon	1942	1968	25	Singer	Heroin	Unknown		
Phil Lynott	1949	1986	36	Musician	Disputed	Unknown	Conflicting sources report various causes of death, including heart and liver failure, heart failure and pneumonia after a drug overdose, and blood poisoning from heroin addiction	
Billy Mackenzie	1957	1997	39	Musician	Unspecified	Unknown		
Jim Magnuson	1946	1991	44	Baseball pitcher	Alcohol	Unknown		
Jesse Mahelona	1983	2009	26	American football player	Alcohol	Accidental	Motor-vehicle collision while intoxicated	
Chris Mainwaring	1965	2007	41	Australian football player	Cocaine	Accidental		
Bibek Maitra	1965	2006	40	Politician	Unspecified	Unknown		
Thomas Manby	1769	1834	65	British naval officer	Opium	Unknown		
Klaus Mann	1906	1949	42	Writer	Sleeping pills	Unknown		
Dmitry Markov	1982	2024	41	Photographer	Methadone	Unknown		
Sherri Martel	1958	2007	49	Wrestler	Oxycodone	Accidental	Other unspecified drugs were involved	
J. Sella Martin	1832	1876	43	Abolitionist	Laudanum	Suicide		
Virginia Maskell	1936	1968	31	Actress	Barbiturates	Unknown		
Thalia Massie	1911	1963	52	Wife	Barbiturates	Unknown		
Lisa Matsumoto	1964	2007	43	Author	Alcohol	Accidental	Motor-vehicle collision while intoxicated	
John Matuszak	1950	1989	38	American football player	Dextropropoxyphene	Accidental		
Billy Mays	1958	2009	50	Salesperson	Cocaine	Heart disease	Cocaine use was listed as a contributory cause of death	
David McComb	1962	1999	36	Musician	Heroin	Unknown		
Kid McCoy	1872	1940	67	Boxer	Sleeping pills	Suicide		
Jimmy McCulloch	1953	1979	26	Musician	Heroin	Unknown		
Marie McDonald	1923	1965	42	Actress	Unspecified multiple drugs	Unknown		
Jim McElroy	1862	1889	26	Baseball player	Morphine	Suicide		
Robbie McIntosh	1950	1974	24	Musician	Heroin	Unknown		
Stephen McKeag	1970	2000	30	Ulster Defence Association member	Cocaine and unspecified painkillers	Unknown		
Maggie McNamara	1928	1978	49	Actress	Sleeping pills	Suicide		
Lance McNaught	1981	2010	29	Wrestler	Unspecified	Accidental	Intoxication from mixed drugs complicated a cardiomyopathy	
Aimee Semple McPherson	1890	1944	53	Evangelist	Sleeping pills	Unknown		
Jonathan Melvoin	1961	1996	34	Keyboardist	Heroin	Unknown		
Mayo Methot	1904	1951	47	Actress	Alcohol	Unknown		
Alfred Métraux	1902	1963	60	Anthropologist	Unspecified	Suicide		
Robin Milford	1903	1959	56	Composer	Aspirin	Suicide		
Mac Miller	1992	2018	26	Rapper	Fentanyl, cocaine, and alcohol	Accidental		
Mary Millington	1945	1979	33	Model, pornographic actress	Paracetamol	Suicide		
Miss Elizabeth	1960	2003	42	Wrestling manager	Multiple	Unknown	Painkillers, nausea medication, tranquilizers and alcohol	
Marilyn Monroe	1926	1962	36	Actress	Barbiturates	Suicide (suspected)	Officially ruled as a probable suicide though several conspiracy theories exist	
Haoui Montaug	1952	1991	38–39	Bouncer	Secobarbital	Suicide		
Cory Monteith	1982	2013	31	Actor, musician	Heroin and alcohol	Accidental (suspected)		
Alain Montpetit	1950	1987	36	Media personality	Unspecified	Unknown		
Teresa Wilms Montt	1893	1921	28	Writer	Barbital	Suicide		
Keith Moon	1946	1978	32	Musician	Anti-seizure medication	Accidental	The medication had been prescribed for alcoholism	
Perry Moore	1971	2011	39	Director	Multiple	Accidental	Methadone, morphine and benzodiazaprine	
Dennis Moran	1982	2013	30	Security hacker	Heroin	Unknown		
Susan Morgan	1957	2009	52	Author	Unspecified painkillers	Suicide		
Erick Morillo	1971	2020	49	Disk jockey	Ketamine	Accidental	Cause of death was "acute ketamine toxicity" with MDMA and cocaine listed as contributing causes	
Chester Morris	1901	1970	69	Actor	Barbiturates	Unknown		
Jim Morrison	1943	1971	27	Musician	Heroin	Heart failure	Official cause of death was heart failure, though no autopsy was performed; strongly suspected to have been a heroin overdose	
Chuck Mosley	1959	2017	57	Musician	Heroin	Unknown	Suspected	
David James Mossman	1926	1971	44	Journalist	Sleeping pills	Suicide		
Billy Murcia	1951	1972	21	Musician	Methaqualone and alcohol	Unknown		
Ona Munson	1903	1955	51	Actress	Sleeping pills	Suicide		
Brittany Murphy	1977	2009	32	Actress	Unspecified	Multiple	Cause of death was a combination of pneumonia, an iron deficiency and combined drug intoxication of legal drugs for influenza treatment	
Brent Mydland	1952	1990	37	Musician	Cocaine and morphine	Unknown		
Valerie Grosvenor Myer	1935	2007	72	Writer	Sleeping pills	Suicide		
Yves Navarre	1940	1994	53	Writer	Barbiturates	Suicide		
Scott Newman	1950	1978	28	Actor	Multiple	Accidental	Diazepam, alcohol and other unspecified drugs	
Tina Onassis Niarchos	1929	1974	45	Wife	Unspecified	Unknown		
Ruth Rowland Nichols	1901	1960	59	Aviator	Barbiturates	Suicide		
Joachim Nielsen	1964	2000	36	Musician, poet	Unspecified	Unknown		
Filip Nikolic	1974	2009	35	Singer	Sleeping pills	Undetermined		
Cranford Nix	1969	2002	33	Musician	Unspecified	Unknown		
Mary Nolan	1902	1948	45	Actress	Secobarbital	Unknown		
Bradley Nowell	1968	1996	28	Musician	Heroin	Unknown		
John Odom	1982	2008	26	Baseball player	Multiple	Accidental	Heroin, methamphetamines, benzylpiperazine and alcohol	
Lani O'Grady	1954	2001	46	Actress	Fluoxetine and hydrocodone/paracetamol	Unknown		
Johnny O'Keefe	1935	1978	43	Singer	Unspecified	Suicide		
Pascale Ogier	1958	1984	25	Actress	Unspecified	Unknown		
Ol' Dirty Bastard	1968	2004	35	Musician	Cocaine and tramadol	Accidental		
Charlie Ondras	1966	1992	25	Musician	Heroin	Unknown		
Dolores O'Riordan	1971	2018	46	Singer	Alcohol	Accidental	Drowned as a result of alcohol intoxication	
Alice Ormsby-Gore	1952	1995	42	Socialite	Heroin	Misadventure		
Matt Osborne	1957	2013	55	Wrestler	Hydrocodone and morphine	Accidental		
Brian Ottney	1980	2003	23	Football player	Unspecified medication and alcohol	Suicide		
Liam O'Sullivan	1981	2002	20	Football player	Unspecified	Unknown		
Leila Pahlavi	1970	2001	31	Princess, model	Secobarbital	Unknown		
Helen Palmer	1898	1967	69	Writer	Barbiturates	Suicide		
Hayden Panettiere	1989	2026	36	American actress and singer	Multiple	Accidental	Fentanyl, 4-ANPP, alprazolam, methocarbamol, and quetiapine	
Marco Pantani	1970	2004	34	Cyclist	Cocaine	Accidental		
Fran Papasedero	1969	2003	34	American football coach	Alcohol	Accidental	Motor-vehicle collision while intoxicated	
Gram Parsons	1946	1973	26	Singer	Morphine and alcohol	Unknown		
Robert Pastorelli	1954	2004	49	Actor	Heroin	Unknown		
Jenny Pat	1981	2014	33	Art dealer	Unspecified prescription drugs	Unknown		
Cesare Pavese	1908	1950	41	Poet, novelist	Barbiturates	Suicide		
Liam Payne	1993	2024	31	Singer and songwriter	Multiple	Unknown	Fell from a hotel balcony while intoxicated by alcohol, cocaine and a prescribed antidepressant, resulting in polytrauma	
Andrea Pazienza	1956	1988	32	Comics artist	Heroin	Unknown		
Harvey Pekar	1939	2010	70	Comic writer	Bupropion and fluoxetine	Accidental		
D.H. Peligro	1959	2022	63	Drummer	Heroin and fentanyl	Unknown		
Carl Perkins	1928	1958	29	Pianist	Heroin	Unknown	Suspected overdose	
Matthew Perry	1969	2023	54	Actor	Ketamine	Accidental	Contributing factors were listed as drowning, coronary artery disease, and buprenorphine effects	
Amanda Peterson	1971	2015	43	Actress	Morphine	Accidental		
Christopher Pettiet	1976	2000	24	Actor	Unspecified	Accidental		
Tom Petty	1950	2017	66	Musician	Multiple	Accidental	Fentanyl, oxycodone, temazepam, alprazolam, citalopram, acetylfentanyl, and despropionyl fentanyl	
William Petzäll	1988	2012	24	Politician	Benzodiazepine and pregabalin	Unknown		
Kristen Pfaff	1967	1994	27	Musician	Heroin	Unknown		
River Phoenix	1970	1993	23	Actor	Cocaine and heroin	Accidental		
Rob Pilatus	1965	1998	32	Musician	Unspecified prescription drugs and alcohol	Unknown		
Pimp C	1973	2007	33	Musician	Codeine and promethazine	Unknown		
Alejandra Pizarnik	1936	1972	36	Poet	Unspecified sedatives	Unknown		
Dana Plato	1964	1999	34	Actress	Carisoprodol and hydrocodone/paracetamol	Suicide		
Silvo Plut	1968	2007	38	Serial killer	Sleeping pills	Suicide		
Edgar Allan Poe	1809	1849	40	Poet	Disputed	Disputed	The cause of Poe's death is disputed, but many theories exist. It has been attributed to laudanum, dipsomania and delirium tremens, though also to apoplexy, epilepsy and meningitis	
Jackson Pollock	1912	1956	44	Painter	Alcohol	Accidental	Motor-vehicle collision while intoxicated	
Darrell Porter	1952	2002	50	Baseball catcher	Cocaine	Unknown		
Jesse Powell	1970	2022	52	Musician	Methamphetamine	Accidental		
Marin Preda	1922	1980	57	Writer	Alcohol	Unknown		
Elvis Presley	1935	1977	42	Singer	Multiple	Disputed	Fourteen drugs were involved; it is accepted they played a factor in his death, though to what degree is debated	
Marie Prevost	1896	1937	38	Actress	Alcohol	Unknown		
Dickie Pride	1941	1969	27	Singer	Sleeping pills	Unknown		
Gary Primich	1958	2007	49	Singer	Heroin	Unknown		
Prince	1958	2016	57	Musician	Fentanyl	Accidental		
Fritz Pröll	1915	1944	29	Resistance fighter	Cyanide poisoning	Suicide		
Geoffrey Pyke	1893	1948	54	Journalist	Phenobarbital	Suicide		
Rich Homie Quan	1989	2024	34	Rapper	Multiple	Accidental	Fentanyl, alprazolam, codeine and promethazine	
Robert Quine	1942	2004	61	Musician	Heroin	Suicide		
Glenn Quinn	1970	2002	32	Actor	Unspecified	Accidental		
Dee Dee Ramone	1951	2002	50	Musician	Heroin	Accidental		
Nicola Ann Raphael	1985	2001	15	Student	Dextropropoxyphene	Suicide		
DJ Rashad	1979	2014	34	Disc jockey	Multiple	Accidental	Heroin, cocaine, and alprazolam	
James Ray	1941	c. 1963	21–23	Singer	Unspecified	Unknown		
Amber Rayne	1984	2016	31	Pornographic actress	Cocaine	Accidental		
Richard Realf	1832	1878	46	Poet	Morphine	Unknown		
Jay Reatard	1980	2010	29	Musician	Cocaine and alcohol	Unknown		
Michael Reeves	1943	1969	25	Film director	Barbiturates and alcohol	Unknown		
Wallace Reid	1891	1923	31	Actor	Morphine	Unknown	The morphine was prescribed	
Elis Regina	1945	1982	36	Singer	Multiple	Accidental	Cocaine, alcohol, and temazepam	
The Rev	1981	2009	28	Musician	Multiple	Accidental	Oxycodone, oxymorphone, diazepam, nordiazepam and alcohol	
Willy Rey	1949	1973	23	Model	Barbiturates	Unknown		
Helen Richey	1909	1947	38	Aviator	Sleeping pills	Suicide		
Brad Renfro	1982	2008	25	Actor	Heroin and morphine	Accidental		
Lucha Reyes	1906	1944	38	Singer	Sleeping pills	Suicide		
Adam Rich	1968	2023	54	Actor	Fentanyl	Accidental		
Frank Ringo	1860	1889	28	Baseball player	Morphine	Suicide		
Chynna Rogers	1994	2020	25	Model, musician	Unspecified	Unknown		
Rachel Roberts	1927	1980	53	Actress	Barbiturates	Suicide		
Don Rogers	1962	1986	23	American football player	Cocaine	Unknown	Drug-induced heart attack	
Steve Rogers	1954	2006	51	Rugby league player	Antidepressants and alcohol	Accidental		
Giles Romilly	1916	1967	50	Journalist	Unspecified	Unknown		
Monica Rose	1948	1994	45	TV show hostess	Antidepressants and tranquilizers	Suicide		
Edgar Rosenberg	1925	1987	62	Film producer	Diazepam	Suicide		
Clinton Rossiter	1917	1970	52	Historian	Barbiturates	Suicide		
Mark Rothko	1903	1970	66	Painter	Barbiturates	Suicide	Rothko also slit his wrists	
Axl Rotten	1971	2016	44	Wrestler	Heroin	Unknown		
Dave Rubinstein	1964	1993	28	Singer	Unspecified	Suicide		
Rick Rude	1958	1999	40	Wrestler	Unspecified painkillers	Unknown		
David Ruffin	1941	1991	50	Musician	Crack cocaine	Accidental		
Gerry Ryan	1956	2010	53	Radio personality	Cocaine	Heart attack	Heart attack was suspected to be triggered by cocaine	
Johanna Sällström	1974	2007	32	Actress	Unspecified	Suicide		
Ananda Samarakoon	1911	1962	51	Composer, musician	Sleeping pills	Unknown		
George Sanders	1906	1972	65	Actor	Pentobarbital	Suicide		
Tyler Sash	1988	2015	27	American football player	Hydrocodone and methadone	Accidental		
John Baker Saunders	1954	1999	44	Musician	Heroin	Unknown		
Catya Sassoon	1968	2002	33	Model, actress	Cocaine and hydromorphone	Unknown		
Sonja Savić	1961	2008	47	Actress	Unspecified	Unknown		
Big Scarr	2000	2022	22	Rapper	Unspecified prescription drugs	Accidental		
Sybille Schmitz	1909	1955	45	Actress	Sleeping pills	Suicide		
Donald Sinclair	1911	1995	84	Veterinary surgeon	Barbiturates	Suicide		
Gia Scala	1934	1972	38	Actress, model	Unspecified drugs and alcohol	Accidental		
Frederick Schwatka	1849	1892	43	Army officer	Opiates	Suicide	Conflicting sources report morphine or laudanum as causing the overdose	
Bon Scott	1946	1980	33	Musician	Alcohol	Unknown		
Ronnie Scott	1927	1996	69	Musician	Barbiturates	Accidental	The barbiturates were prescribed	
George Scott III	1953	1980	26	Bass player	Unspecified	Unknown		
Pat Screen	1943	1994	51	American football player	Unspecified	Unknown		
Dave Schulthise	1956	2004	47	Musician	Unspecified pills	Suicide		
Rod Scurry	1956	1992	36	Baseball pitcher	Cocaine	Unknown	Drug-induced heart attack	
William Seabrook	1884	1945	61	Writer	Sleeping pills	Suicide		
Jean Seberg	1938	1979	40	Actress	Barbiturates and alcohol	Suicide		
Edie Sedgwick	1943	1971	28	Actress	Barbiturates and alcohol	Undetermined	Her death certificate states the immediate cause of death was "probable acute barbiturate intoxication" due to alcohol intoxication	
Eddy Shaver	1962	2000	38	Musician	Heroin	Accidental		
Mark Shaw	1921	1969	47	Photographer	Amphetamines	Unknown		
Bobby Sheehan	1968	1999	31	Musician	Unspecified	Unknown		
Toby Sheldon	1980	2015	35	Songwriter	Multiple	Accidental	Hydrocodone/paracetamol, alprazolam, alcohol and temazepam	
Shifty Shellshock	1974	2024	49	Musician	Multiple	Accidental	Fentanyl, cocaine, and methamphetamine	
Shock G	1963	2021	57	Rapper	Fentanyl, alcohol and methamphetamine	Accidental		
Eric Show	1956	1994	37	Baseball player	Cocaine and heroin	Unknown		
Dakota Skye	1994	2021	27	Pornographic actress	Multiple	Accidental	Coroner's report concluded death was from "acute multidrug intoxication"	
Elizabeth Siddal	1829	1862	32	Model, poet	Laudanum	Unknown		
Judee Sill	1944	1979	35	Musician	Cocaine and heroin	Unknown		
Don Simpson	1943	1996	52	Film producer	Cocaine and unspecified prescription drugs	Unknown	Drug-induced heart failure	
The Singing Nun	1933	1985	51	Nun	Barbiturates and alcohol	Suicide		
Vera Sisson	1891	1954	63	Actress	Barbiturates	Suicide		
Tyler Skaggs	1991	2019	27	Baseball pitcher	Multiple	Accidental	Choked on his own vomit while under the influence of alcohol, fentanyl and oxycodone	
Everett Sloane	1909	1965	55	Actor	Barbiturates	Suicide		
Hillel Slovak	1962	1988	26	Musician	Heroin	Unknown		
Alvin Smith	1798	1823	25	Carpenter's assistant	Mercury poisoning	Accidental (Disputed)	Officially administered to cure bilious colic, though speculated as murder	
Anna Nicole Smith	1967	2007	39	Model	Multiple	Accidental	Unspecified anti-depressants, diazepam, chloral hydrate, oseltamivir, methadone, sleeping pills, anti-anxiety medication and human growth hormone	
Christine Smith	1946	1979	32	Skier	Multiple	Suicide	Chloralhydrate, paracetamol and salicylic acid	
Daniel Wayne Smith	1986	2006	20	Student	Multiple	Accidental	Cardiac dysrhythmia caused by methadone, escitalopram and sertraline	
Lauren Smith-Fields	1998	2021	23	Student	Fentanyl and alcohol	Unknown		
Dash Snow	1981	2009	27	Artist	Heroin	Unknown		
Robert Soblen	1900	1962	61	Psychiatrist	Barbiturates	Unknown		
Freddy Soto	1970	2005	35	Comedian	Fentanyl	Accidental		
Erin Spanevello	1987	2008	21	Model	Gamma-Hydroxybutyric acid and MDMA	Unknown		
Louie Spicolli	1971	1998	27	Wrestler	Unspecified	Unknown	Conflicting sources state drug overdose or coronary disease that might have been impacted by drug use	
Oscar Spirescu	1874	1918	43–44	Composer	Chloroform	Suicide		
Mark St. John	1956	2007	51	Musician	Methamphetamine	Accidental	Brain hemorrhage bought on by an accidental overdose of methamphetamines	
Layne Staley	1967	2002	34	Musician	Multiple	Unknown	Cocaine, heroin and codeine	
Mike Starr	1966	2011	44	Musician	Unspecified prescription drugs	Unknown		
Wayne Static	1965	2014	48	Musician	Multiple	Accidental	Ooxycodone, hydromorphone, alprazolam and with alcohol	
Jahna Steele	1958	2008	49	Showgirl	Multiple	Unknown	Cocaine, hydromorphone and morphine	
Joey Stefano	1968	1994	26	Pornographic actor	Multiple	Unknown	Cocaine, morphine, heroin and ketamine	
Miroslava Stern	1926	1955	29	Actress	Sleeping pills	Suicide		
Avram Steuerman-Rodion	1872	1918	45	Poet, physician	Morphine	Suicide		
Carl Steven	1974	2011	36	Actor	Heroin	Unknown		
Inger Stevens	1934	1970	35	Actress	Barbiturates	Suicide		
Cathy Stewart	1956	1994	38	Pornographic actress	Unspecified	Unknown		
Albert Stinson	1944	1969	24	Musician	Unspecified	Unknown		
Rory Storm	1939	1972	34	Musician	Sleeping pills and alcohol	Unknown		
Rose Stradner	1913	1958	45	Actress	Unspecified	Suicide		
Margaret Sullavan	1909	1960	50	Actress	Barbiturates	Suicide		
Paige Summers	1976	2003	27	Pornographic actress	Unspecified	Unknown		
R. G. Surdam	1835	1891	56	Real-estate agent	Laudanum	Accidental		
Marek Svatoš	1982	2016	34	Ice hockey player	Multiple	Unknown	Codeine, morphine and alprazolam	
Jennifer Syme	1972	2001	28	Actress	Multiple	Accidental	Motor-vehicle collision while intoxicated by cocaine, clonazepam and cyclobenzaprine	
Joan Tabor	1932	1968	36	Actress	Unspecified influenza medication	Accidental		
Hidemitsu Tanaka	1913	1949	36	Writer	Sleeping pills	Suicide		
Warren Tartaglia	1944	1965	22	Musician	Heroin	Unknown		
Chase Tatum	1973	2008	34	Wrestler	Unspecified	Unknown	Suspected overdose; Tatum was addicted to painkillers for years	
Mackenzie Taylor	1978	2010	32	Comedian	Unspecified	Suicide		
Vincent Taylor	1949	1974	25	Musician	Heroin	Unknown		
Sara Teasdale	1884	1933	48	Poet	Sleeping pills	Suicide		
Test	1975	2009	33	Wrestler	Oxycodone	Accidental		
Gary Thain	1948	1975	27	Musician	Heroin	Unknown		
John Thompson	1938	1976	38	Poet	Barbiturates and alcohol	Unknown		
Linda Thompson	1953	2009	56	Conspiracy theorist	Unspecified painkillers	Suicide	The painkillers were prescribed	
Jotie T'Hooft	1956	1977	21	Poet	Unspecified	Unknown		
Johnny Thunders	1952	1991	38	Musician	Disputed	Unknown	Autopsy results were inconclusive, though it is generally believed to be drug-related, and has been attributed to methadone and cocaine overdose	
James Timberlake	1846	1891	44	Lawman	Morphine	Unknown		
Sammee Tong	1901	1964	63	Actor	Barbiturates	Suicide	Suspected overdose	
Georg Trakl	1887	1914	27	Poet	Cocaine	Suicide		
William Trimmer	c. 1822	1867	54–56	Vigneron	Laudanum	Suicide		
Kurt Tucholsky	1890	1935	45	Journalist	Barbital	Unknown		
Mark Tuinei	1960	1999	39	American football player	Heroin and MDMA	Unknown		
Nick Traina	1978	1997	19	Singer	Morphine	Suicide		
Norman Treigle	1927	1975	48	Singer	Sleeping pills	Accidental		
Verne Troyer	1969	2018	48	Actor	Alcohol	Suicide		
Amy Tryon	1970	2012	42	Equestrian	Oxycodone and other opiates	Accidental		
Alan Turing	1912	1954	41	Computer scientist	Cyanide poisoning	Disputed suicide		
D. M. Turner	1962	1996	34	Author	Ketamine	Unknown	Drowned while intoxicated	
Lynn Turner	1968	2010	42	Murderer	Propranolol	Suicide		
Ike Turner	1931	2007	76	Musician, producer	Cocaine	Unknown	Hypertensive cardiovascular disease and emphysema were contributing factors	
Dick Twardzik	1931	1955	24	Pianist	Heroin	Unknown		
Helen Twelvetrees	1908	1958	49	Actress	Unspecified	Suicide		
twomad	2000	2024	23	YouTuber	Morphine	Accidental		
John Tyndall	1820	1893	73	Physicist	Chloral hydrate	Accidental		
Dorothy Uhnak	1930	2006	76	Author	Unspecified	Suicide		
Umaga	1973	2009	36	Wrestler	Unspecified	Unknown		
Mary Ure	1933	1975	42	Actress	Barbiturates and alcohol	Accidental		
Enrique Urquijo	1960	1999	39	Singer	Unspecified	Unknown		
Luna Vachon	1962	2010	48	Wrestler	Benzodiazepine and oxycodone	Accidental		
Paul Vaessen	1961	2001	39	Football player	Unspecified	Unknown		
Brandon Vedas	1981	2003	21	Computer expert	Multiple	Unknown	Alcohol, cannabis, psilocybin mushroom, clonazepam, temazepam, methadone, hydrocodone and propranolol	
Lupe Vélez	1908	1944	36	Actress	Secobarbital	Suicide		
Michael VerMeulen	1956	1995	38	Magazine editor	Cocaine	Unknown		
Jon Vincent	1962	2000	38	Pornographic actor	Heroin	Unknown		
Sid Vicious	1957	1979	21	Musician	Heroin	Suicide (suspected)		
The Vivienne	1992	2025	32	Drag queen	Ketamine	Unknown	Ketamine-induced cardiac arrest	
Mike Von Erich	1964	1987	23	Wrestler	Tranquilizer	Suicide		
Marie Walcamp	1894	1936	42	Actress	Unspecified painkillers	Suicide		
Robert Walker	1918	1951	32	Actor	Unspecified sedatives	Accidental		
Jeremy Ward	1976	2003	27	Sound technician	Unspecified	Unknown		
Stephen Ward	1912	1963	50	Osteopathic physician	Sleeping pills	Suicide	Death was officially ruled a suicide but it has been speculated as murder	
Dinah Washington	1924	1963	39	Singer	Secobarbital and amobarbital	Unknown		
Kazuki Watanabe	1981	2000	19	Musician	Unspecified sedatives	Suicide		
Peter Watts	1946	1976	30	Road manager	Heroin	Unknown		
Dave Waymer	1958	1993	34	American football player	Cocaine	Accidental	Drug-induced heart attack	
Mikey Welsh	1971	2011	40	Musician	Unspecified	Unknown		
Scott Weiland	1967	2015	48	Musician	Multiple	Accidental	Cocaine, alcohol and MDA	
Jaromír Weinberger	1896	1967	71	Composer	Unspecified sedatives	Unknown		
Lieuwe Westra	1982	2023	40	Cyclist	Methamphetamine, MDMA and Amphetamine	Accidental		
Assia Wevill	1927	1969	41	Poet	Sleeping pills	Suicide	Wevill took the pills then exposed herself to carbon monoxide	
Rachel Whitear	1979	2000	21	Student	Heroin	Accidental		
Brett Whiteley	1939	1992	53	Artist	Heroin	Unknown		
Keith Whitley	1955	1989	33	Singer	Alcohol	Unknown		
Danny Whitten	1943	1972	29	Musician	Diazepam and alcohol	Unknown		
David Widgery	1947	1992	45	Writer	Multiple	Unknown	Alcohol, barbiturates and pethidine	
Ellen Wilkinson	1891	1947	55	Politician	Barbiturates	Unknown		
Kenneth Williams	1926	1988	62	Actor	Barbiturates	Unknown		
Michael K. Williams	1966	2021	54	Actor	Multiple	Accidental	Fentanyl, p-fluorofentanyl, heroin and cocaine	
Ricky Williams	1956	1992	36	Musician	Heroin	Unknown		
Alan Wilson	1943	1970	27	Musician	Barbiturates	Accidental	Death was officially ruled accidental though has been speculated as suicide	
Amy Winehouse	1983	2011	27	Singer	Alcohol	Unknown		
Sheree Winton	1935	1976	39	Singer	Barbiturates	Suicide		
Grant Withers	1905	1959	54	Actor	Sleeping pills	Suicide		
Harris Wittels	1984	2015	30	Comedian	Heroin	Accidental		
Carl Wittman	1943	1986	42	Activist	Unspecified	Suicide		
Linda Wong	1951	1987	36	Pornographic actress	Unspecified	Unknown		
Andrew Wood	1966	1990	24	Singer	Heroin	Unknown		
Anna Wood	1980	1995	15	Student	MDMA	Water intoxication	Died from water intoxication secondary to use of MDMA	
Natalie Wood	1938	1981	43	Actress	Multiple	Accidental	Drowned while intoxicated by alcohol; there were traces of a motion-sickness pill and a painkiller in her blood, both of which would have increased the effects of alcohol	
Corissa Yasen	1973	2001	27	Athlete	Multiple	Unknown	Diazepam, hydrocodone, lorazepam, fluoxetine and other drugs including anti-depressants, painkillers and anxiety medications	
Paula Yates	1959	2000	41	TV presenter	Heroin	Accidental		
Kelly Yeomans	1984	1997	13	Student	Dextropropoxyphene	Suicide		
Elvis Yero	1965	2001	36	Boxer	Unspecified	Unknown		
Philip Van Zandt	1904	1958	53	Actor	Unspecified	Unknown		
Zeke Zettner	1948	1973	25	Musician	Heroin	Unknown		
Stefan Zweig	1881	1942	60	Playwright	Sleeping pills	Suicide		

== See also ==
- List of deaths from legal euthanasia and assisted suicide
- List of deaths through alcohol
- List of people executed by lethal injection
- Lists of people by cause of death
- Opioid epidemic
- United States drug overdose death rates and totals over time
