= Susan Morgan =

Susan Morgan may refer to:

- Susan Morgan (writer) (born 1957), English author of chick-lit genre
- Susan Morgan (politician) (born 1990), American Republican politician in the state of Oregon
- Susan Rigby Dallam Morgan, American author and poet

== See also ==
- Susan Morgan Leveille (born 1949), American weaver and teacher
- Sue Morgan (disambiguation)
- Susie Morgan, United States district judge
