= Malcolm Weir =

Malcolm Weir is a retired doctor and formerly Her Majesty's Coroner for the county of Essex. Weir most famously oversaw the inquest of teenager Leah Betts in 1996. To determine how she died, Weir enlisted the help of John Henry, an expert toxicologist from London. Weir recorded a verdict of accidental death caused by non-dependent use of drugs.

In 1999, Weir retired from his post. Upon his resignation, he was replaced by Caroline Beasley-Murray, who still served until 2020, followed by Lincoln Brookes. Afterwards he became the deputy coroner.
