= Close-Up Forever Summer concert deaths =

Drug-related deaths in Pasay, Philippines

Close-Up Forever Summer concert tragedy
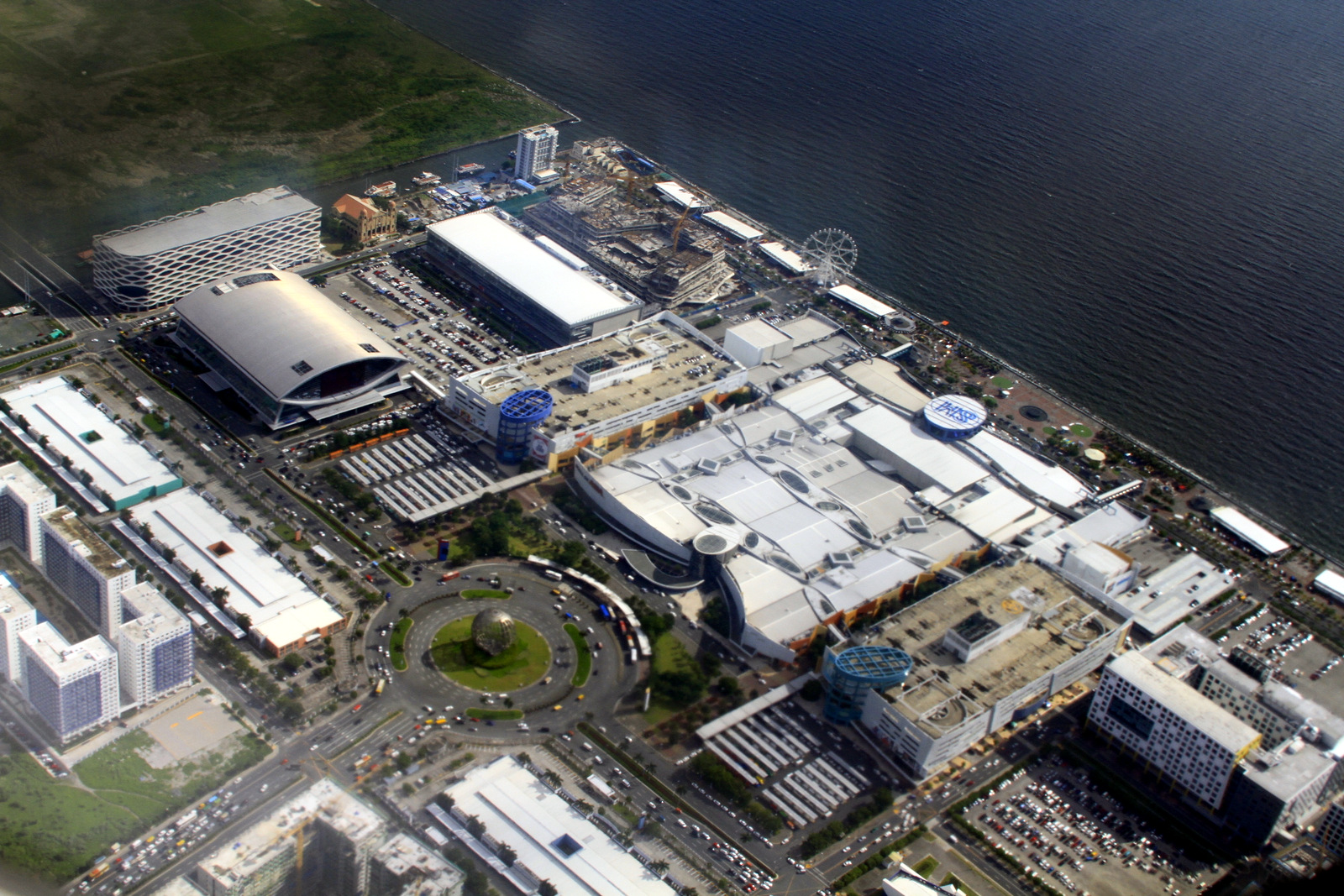
- SM Mall of Asia shopping mall complex. The event took place at the SM Mall of Asia parking area.
- Date: May 21-22, 2016
- Time: No exact time specified in official police reports.
- Venue: SM Mall of Asia concert grounds
- Location: Pasay, Metro Manila, Philippines; 14.5351°N 120.9821°E
- Also known as: Pasay concert tragedy Forever Summer concert tragedy
- Organised by: Close-Up Philippines
- Deaths: 5

In the early morning hours of May 22, 2016, five people died after taking alleged illegal drugs during a rave dance party organized by Close-Up entitled Forever Summer, at the SM Mall of Asia concert grounds in Pasay, Philippines.

== Background ==
Promotional video for the event

Forever Summer is a series of music parties hosted by the toothpaste brand Close-Up owned, marketed, and manufactured by fast-moving consumer goods multinational conglomerate Unilever. The May 2016 rave set was billed as the "last" Close-Up Forever Summer set among three annual sets since 2014, and featured Julian Jordan, DJ duo Dimitri Vegas & Like (who first appeared and performed in the Philippines in this event), Malaysian duo Goldfish & Blink, Belgian act MATTN, among other acts including Marc Naval, Kat DJ, MC Pao, and Ace Ramos. Previously, Forever Summer sets featured electronic dance music artists Alesso, Martin Garrix, Angus & Julia Stone. For years, Close-Up has extensively used lovebirds and romantic couples in advertising as a selling point, making a hard point that kisses are better without bad breath - and marketed the first Forever Summer sets around 2014 with couples meeting at a rave set and kissing. The tickets for the final Forever Summer set costed around PhP 4,000 per person.

=== Lovapalooza ===
Forever Summer is a spiritual successor to a similar previous series of concerts and music sets also organized by Close-Up entitled "Lovapalooza" - a portmanteau of the words "love" and "lollapalooza" - usually held annually in the coming weekends right before Valentine's Day, in which music by featured bands and acts are played and couples kiss simultaneously in midnight, denoted by a countdown on the stadium loudspeakers. Thus, the event begins in the early evening and ends around the early morning hours on the following day. Unlike the Forever Summer series of events which focused on electronic dance music acts based around Europe, Benelux, and Southeast Asia, Lovapalooza had a more pronounced emphasis on live music by homegrown Filipino rock bands popular at the time. It was concieved by Unilever Philippines corporate chief Noel Lorenzana and was first held in February 13, 2004 in Baywalk, Roxas Boulevard, it broke a world record for 5,347 kissing couples, breaking the previous Guinness World Record in Chile for 4,445.

The second Lovapalooza held in 2005 multiple locations (Baywalk, Manila, Davao, Cebu, Angeles City, Pampanga) and was promoted as "not to beat a record but a tradition" - during that year Hungary stole the record in June 25, 2005 with 5,875 kissing couples in Elisabeth Bridge, Budapest. The third, held in February 11, 2006, was participated by couples known in Filipino show business inside and outside the cameras - Bea Alonzo and John Lloyd Cruz, Iya Villania and Drew Arellano, Nancy Castiglione and Luis Manzano, Cheska Garcia and Doug Kramer. Unfortunately, it failed to beat the Hungarian world record.

The fourth Lovapalooza, held in February 10, 2007, and featured music acts such as Rocksteddy, The Itchyworms, Sugarfree, Rivermaya, Sandwich, featured singers such as Rachelle Ann Go, Christian Bautista, Sam Milby, Nina, Nyoy Volante, Kitchie Nadal, and attended by couple John Lloyd Cruz and Bea Alonzo among others, finally broke the Hungarian world record with a total of 6,124 couples kissing for at least 10 seconds.

The fifth Lovapalooza was held in February 13, 2008 in Taguig.

The sixth was held in February 14, 2009 at the Seaside Blvd of the SM Mall of Asia in Pasay, in association with MTV Philippines, but didn't aim to break world records. Officially dubbed "Close Up Red Hot Valentines", it featured MTV Philippines video jockeys Kat Alano, Sib Sibulo, Andi Manzano as hosts of the event, giving trivia and games to participants, while the performing acts included Bamboo, Rico Blanco (both members of Rivermaya who performed previously on Lovapalooza), Sponge Cola, and Pupil as well as the Metro Philharmonic Orchestra providing strings and orchestration.

The name Lovapalooza was slowly retired beginning from 2010 to 2013, and under this incarnation, Close-Up events had little, if any, injuries or casualties.

=== Earlier Forever Summer events ===
The first Close-up Forever Summer branded event was held in April 5, 2014 at the Globe Circuit Events Ground, and featured acts such as Alesso, Deniz Koyu, Helena, Ace Ramos, Mars Miranda, Martin Pulgar, and Marc Naval. Tickets were sold at prices ranging from Php 2000 to Php 3000.

The second Forever Summer branded event was held on May 16, 2015, SM Mall of Asia Concert ground, and performers included Martin Garrix, Eva Shaw and Angus & Julia Stone and Nix Damn P, Motherbass, BP Valenzuela, Autotelic and Sinyma.

=== Green Amore ===
Green Amore, also known as "fly high", is a mix of ecstasy and methamphetamine, reportedly nicknamed "fly high" due to its supposed aphrodisiac qualities. It is nicknamed "Green Amore" because it usually comes in green capsules, and usually costs PhP 1,500 to 3,500 per capsule, which can be shared by 2-8 users. It achieved notoriety for being one of the deadly drugs used in the 2016 rave set.

== Incident and investigation ==
A report from Pasay city police stated that four casualties - namely Bianca Fontejon (18), American national Eric Anthony Miller (33), Ariel Leal (22) and Lance Garcia (36) - were found unconscious while the concert was ongoing at the SM Mall of Asia. All four were brought to a hospital but died shortly thereafter. A fifth casualty - Ken Migawa (18), also found unconscious, was later brought to a hospital in critical condition and died the night of May 22. The five fatalities were not acquainted with each other. The deaths occurred hours after the concert began.

At the time of the concert, no bouncers or security personnel were present at the middle of gathering but about 70 policemen were deployed at the venue.

Investigating officer Giovanni Arcinue said that the police were looking at dehydration or heat stroke as possible causes as the country is in dry season brought about by El Niño. Netizens speculated that the victims took the recreational drug called "Green Amore", a lethal mix of ecstasy and methamphetamine. Investigators stated that the rumors on social media still presume that drug-laced drinks were the probable cause of their deaths.

=== Autopsy ===
On May 22, an autopsy report revealed that Fontejon and Garcia died due to sudden heart attack, this according to Dr. Wilfredo Esquivel Tierra, Assistant Chief of the National Bureau of Investigation (NBI) Medico-Legal Division. According to the medico legal report of NBI, it was shown that Fontejon had two types of dangerous drugs in her body: MDMA methylene homolog and synthetic cathinones. The NBI refused to speculate how it got into her body. The last two autopsies conducted by Superintendent Bonnie Chua, head of the Crime Laboratory of the Southern Police District (SPD), revealed that Migawa and Miller died of heart failure and brain swelling.

In a statement given on May 26, the NBI revealed that whatever the fatalities had ingested can be described as "explosive". It was potent enough to damage the heart and internal organs of the victims, which showed signs of ruptured tissues and blood vessels. According to the medico-legal officer assigned to the case, the autopsy results were unusual and it was his "first time to witness a severe form of organ damage". All parts of the heart were greatly damaged; the heart turned from pink in color to brown, red and black. The NBI also clarified that heart attack was not the only cause of the deaths, but also the simultaneous failure of internal organs — swelling of the brain, lungs, liver, intestines, spleen and kidneys.

On June 7, the PNP Crime Laboratory confirmed that the amphetamine-based metabolites para-Methoxyamphetamine and methylenedioxyamphetamine were found on the bodies of Migawa and Miller, in addition to traces of methylenedioxycathinone found on Migawa.

=== Suspects ===
On the morning of May 28, 2016, the NBI in coordination with the Philippine Drug Enforcement Agency (PDEA) arrested 23-year-old Joshua Habalo in an entrapment operation at a club at Remington Hotel (now Holiday Inn Express Manila Newport City), located within the Resorts World Manila (now Newport World Resorts) complex in Pasay. According to Senior Investigator Salvador Arteche Jr., Habalo offered the undercover NBI operatives five tablets of pink ecstasy worth ₱1,500 (equivalent to ₱1,782 in 2021) before the operatives seized the tablets, in addition to five sachets of suspected cocaine and another sachet of three green capsules suspected to be the "green amore", the designer drug believed to have been sold at the concert which the five victims may have taken. The NBI and the PDEA have said that Habalo will be charged of drug possession and selling of drugs under the Comprehensive Dangerous Drugs Act of 2002.

On June 1, 2016, the NBI arrested in a buy bust operation five persons allegedly involved in the sale of illegal drugs at the CloseUp Forever Summer concert. Arrested were Marc Deen, his wife Erica Valbuena, Thomas Halili, Martin Dimacali and Seergeoh Villanueva (alias Gio). During the buy bust operation conducted in Parañaque, Atty. Joel Tovera, chief of the NBI's Anti-Illegal Drugs Division, said it was Villanueva who handed a small medicine bottle containing 10 pieces of ecstasy pills after receiving the marked money. The NBI agents proceeded to the condominium unit where Deen was waiting for his share of the proceeds of the ecstasy sale. Inside Deen's condominium unit was a kitchen type laboratory where the illegal drugs were being manufactured. Also recovered in the operation were synthetic materials, various drug paraphernalia and a manual on making illegal drugs such as methamphetamine hydrochloride or shabu, D-lysergic acid diethylamide and gamma-Hydroxybutyric acid (GHB) or liquid ecstasy.

== Reactions ==
In a statement posted on their official Facebook page, Close-Up, along with organizing agency, Activations Advertising, and staging agency, Eventscape, extended their sympathies to the families of the fatalities, and vowed to extend medical assistance support so the victims may fully recover.

Then presumptive president-elect Rodrigo Duterte called a press conference on May 26 in response to the concert deaths. He questioned how illegal drugs entered the concert, despite police presence. He also called for reshuffling of police and military personnel, and increased security during concerts to prevent illegal drugs from being smuggled into the event.

Then-Senator Tito Sotto said in a privilege speech that the use of the over-the-counter drug "Wari-Activ" (muscle pain killer, also known as laughing gas) was one of the reasons for the death of 5 people in the concert.

== Aftermath ==
On February 1, 2017, the National Bureau of Investigation (NBI) formally charged the executives of Unilever Philippines and their event organizers for criminal negligence before the Department of Justice. The NBI, representing several relatives of the victims, has said the respondents are criminally liable based on the responsible officer doctrine "for they held a position of responsibility and authority in their respective corporations, and had the ability to prevent the unwanted incidents but failed to do so."

After the incident, Close-Up has never attempted to organize another rave or music party for marketing purposes (even after saying the 2016 set was the "final" one) and has remained so for years after the incident.

== See also ==
- Anna Wood
- Leah Betts
- Philippine drug war
