= Unzipped =

Unzipped may refer to:

- Unzipped (film), a 1995 documentary film
- Unzipped (TV series), a comedy British television programme
- Unzipped, a 2001 television news magazine hosted by Catherine Clark
- Unzipped, a monthly gay pornographic magazine owned by LPI Media
- Unzipped, a 1999 book by Bronwyn Donaghy
- Unzipped: A Toolkit for Life, a 2007 book by Matt Whyman
- Unzipped, a 2007 memoir by Suzi Quatro
- Unzipped, a 1995 EP by Low Pop Suicide
- Unzipped, a 1998 comedy album by Pat Paulsen
