= Zoombombing =

Unwanted intrusion into video conference calls

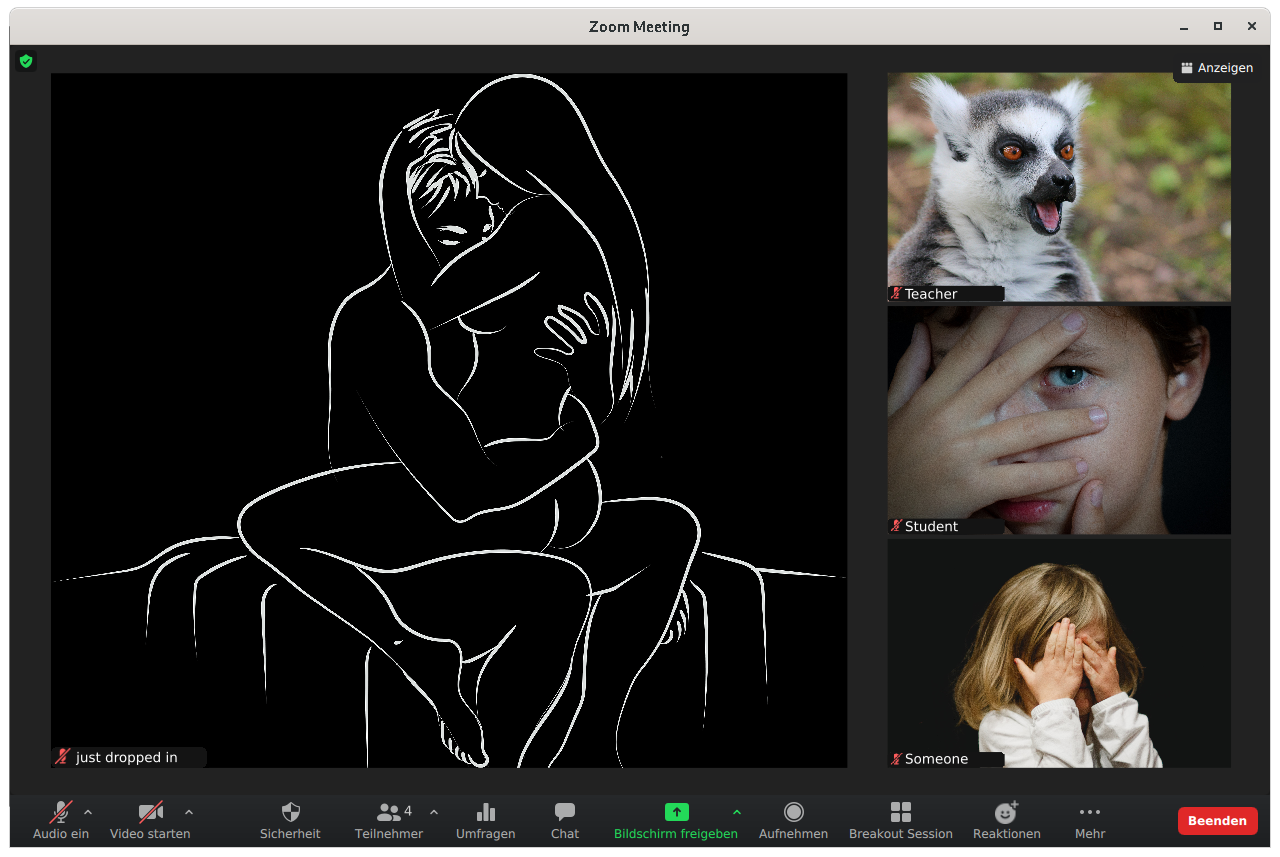
Internet meme portraying a Zoom meeting with an unwanted intrusion

Zoombombing or Zoom raiding is the unwanted, disruptive intrusion, generally by Internet trolls, into a video-conference call. In a typical Zoombombing incident, a teleconferencing session is hijacked by the insertion of material that is lewd, obscene, or offensive in nature, typically resulting in the shutdown of the session or the removal of the troll. The term is especially associated with and is derived from, the name of the Zoom videoconferencing software program; however, it has also been used to refer to the phenomenon on other video conferencing platforms. The term became popularized in 2020 when the COVID-19 pandemic forced many people to stay at home, and videoconferencing came to be used on a large scale by businesses, schools, and social groups.

Zoombombing has caused significant issues in particular for schools, companies, and organizations worldwide. Such incidents have resulted in increased scrutiny on Zoom as well as restrictions on usage of the platform by educational, corporate, and governmental institutions globally. In response, Zoom, citing the sudden influx of new users due to the COVID-19 pandemic, took measures to increase security of its teleconferencing application. Incidents of Zoombombing have prompted law enforcement officers in various countries to investigate such cases and file criminal charges against those responsible.

== Etymology ==
The term Zoombombing is a neologism derived from the teleconferencing application Zoom and influenced by the word photobombing. The term had first appeared in mid-March 2020 on technology and news websites. Zoombombing has also been used in reference to similar incidents on other teleconferencing platforms, such as WebEx or Skype.

== Methods ==
The increased use of Zoom during the COVID-19 pandemic as an alternative to face-to-face meetings resulted in widespread exposure to hackers and Internet trolls, who exploit and work around the application's security features. In various forums such as Discord and Reddit, efforts have been coordinated to disrupt Zoom sessions, while certain Twitter accounts advertise meeting IDs and passwords or meeting links (allowing users to instantly join a Zoom meeting instead of entering the credentials required to access a meeting) for sessions that were vulnerable to being joined without authorization. At educational institutions, some students were "actively asking strangers to Zoombomb or 'Zoom raid' their virtual classrooms to spice up their isolated lessons" and facilitating the raids by sharing passwords with the raiders. CNET pointed out that simple Google searches for URLs that include "Zoom.us" could bring up conferences that are not password protected, and that links within public pages can allow anyone to join. Hackers and trolls also look for easy targets such as unprotected or underprotected "check-in" meetings in which organizations meet with their employers or clients remotely. While a Zoom session is in progress, unfamiliar users show up and hijack the session by saying or showing things that are lewd, obscene, or racist in nature. The compromised Zoom session is then typically shut down by the host. Many of those successful in disrupting sessions have posted video footage of those incidents to social media and video sharing platforms such as TikTok and YouTube.

While it is believed Zoombombing attacks are mainly orchestrated by external hackers and trolls, many are also orchestrated internally from within their respective organization or entity. Some view Zoombombing as a continuation of cyberbullying by teenagers, particularly after schools were shut down due to the pandemic.

== Responses ==
Zoombombings would frequently make the local news for how disruptive they are.

The trolling has caused a number of problems for schools and educators, with unwanted participants posting lewd content to interrupt learning sessions. Some schools had to suspend using video conferencing altogether. The University of Southern California called Zoombombing a type of trolling and apologized for "vile" events that interrupted "lectures and learning." Zoombombing has prompted colleges and universities to publish guides and resources to educate and bring awareness to their students and staff about the phenomenon. Zoombombing has left online lectures vulnerable to the intrusion of people looking to inflict harm. These crimes have brought attention not only to the lack of security on videoconferencing platforms, but also the lack in the universities. According to an article from The Guardian, the University of Warwick, in the midst of a rape-chat scandal, received criticisms for its weak cybersecurity.

Zoombombing affected twelve-step programs such as Alcoholics Anonymous and Narcotics Anonymous and other substance abuse and addiction recovery programs who were forced to switch to online meetings. Concerns arise from causing undue stress to an already vulnerable population and video recording which can break anonymity. Some bombers reference the drug-of-choice for recovery members, such as alcohol, in an attempt to emotionally trigger the participants of the meeting.

The problem reached such prominence that the United States Federal Bureau of Investigation (FBI) warned of video-teleconferencing and online classroom hijacking, which it called "Zoom-bombing." The FBI advised users of teleconferencing software to keep meetings private, require passwords or other forms of access control such as "waiting rooms" to limit access only to specific people, and limiting screen-sharing access to the meeting host only. Given the number of incidents of Zoombombing, New York's attorney general initiated an inquiry into Zoom's data privacy and security policies. U.S. Senator Sherrod Brown (D-OH) asked the Federal Trade Commission to investigate into the matter, accusing Zoom of engaging in deceptive practices regarding user privacy and security.

Amid concerns about Zoombombing, various organizations banned the use of Zoom. In April 2020, Google banned the use of Zoom on its corporate computers, directing employees to instead use its video chat app Google Duo. The use of Zoom was also banned by SpaceX, Smart Communications, NASA, and the Australian Defence Force. The Taiwanese and Canadian governments banned Zoom for all government use. The New York City Department of Education prohibited all its teachers from using the platform with students, and the Clark County School District in Nevada disabled access to Zoom to its staff. Singapore's Ministry of Education briefly banned all teachers within the country from using Zoom before lifting the ban three days later, adding extra security features. Some Zoombombers have shared their side of the story, claiming they aren't trying to cause harm. They claim it is a form of protest in response to the extensive amount of work given from teachers. Not all incidents are malicious, as many have shared some new pop culture, such as memes and TikToks, to bring some relief and fun during the pandemic.

Zoom CEO Eric Yuan made a public apology, saying that the teleconferencing company had not anticipated the sudden influx of new consumer users and stating that "this is a mistake and lesson learned." In response to the concerns, Zoom has published a guide on their blog on how to avoid these types of incidents. On April 7, 2020, Zoom implemented user experience and security updates to the application. Such updates include a more visible "Security" icon for users to see and use, suppression of meeting ID numbers, and a change in the default settings to require passwords and waiting rooms for sessions. On April 8, 2020, Zoom announced that it had formed a council of chief information security officers from other companies to share ideas on best practices, and that it had hired Alex Stamos, former chief security officer of Facebook, as an adviser. Zoom released its 5.0 version in April 2020 with security features that include AES 256-bit GCM encryption, passwords by default, and a feature to report suspicious users to its Trust and Safety Team for possible misuse. In May 2020, Zoom announced it had temporarily disabled its Giphy (frequently used as a tactic in Zoombombing) integration until security concerns could be properly and fully addressed. On July 1, 2020, Zoom stated it had released 100 new safety features over the past 90 days, including end-to-end encryption for all users, turning on meeting passwords by default, giving users the ability to choose which data centers calls are routed from, consulting with security experts, forming a CISO council, an improved bug bounty program, and working with third parties to help test security.

== Criminal use ==
National authorities worldwide warned of possible charges against people engaging with Zoombombing. On April 8, 2020, a teen in Madison, Connecticut, was arrested for computer crime, conspiracy, and disturbing the peace following a Zoombombing incident involving online classes at Daniel Hand High School; police also identified another teen involved in the incident. In San Francisco, a man was arrested after being traced to pornographic videos that were streamed on Zoom. As of May 2020, the FBI has received 195 incidents of Zoombombing involving child abuse, while the United Kingdom's National Crime Agency has reported more than 120 such cases.

== Notable incidents ==
St. Paulus Lutheran Church in San Francisco filed a class-action lawsuit against Zoom after one of its Bible study classes was "Zoombombed" with pornographic videos on May 6, 2020. The church alleged that Zoom "did nothing" when it tried to reach out to the company.

In November 2020, a Dutch journalist for RTL Nieuws managed to gain access to a secret Zoom meeting of European Union defence ministers. The EU's foreign affairs representative Josep Borrell told him that it was a criminal offense and he should sign off before the police arrived. The Zoombomb was revealed to have been the result of the Dutch defence minister Ank Bijleveld posting a picture of herself that showed the login and a partial PIN.

In January 2022, an online event hosted by the Italian Senate's Movimento 5 Stelle and broadcast live to Senato della Repubblica was interrupted by roughly a minute of a 3D animated Final Fantasy VII pornographic parody, displaying the character Tifa Lockhart in the middle of sexual intercourse. Overlapping the content's original audio was a man speaking English with a thick Italian accent stating, "I used to be a sex offender, but now I am a kindergarten teacher."

Brian Adams, a man from Paintsville, Kentucky, faced multiple federal charges after he interrupted an elementary school's video conference class during the COVID-19 pandemic with a digital racist threat. He allegedly crashed a class Zoom conference on October 14, 2020, and targeted the Laureate Academy Charter School, whose student population is about 67% Black, because of its racial demographics.

In 2020, livestreamer Muudea Sedik, better known as twomad, gained popularity for his Zoom bombings. Sedik would request Zoom meeting links or passwords from his followers on social media, and would broadcast the subsequent invasions live. Sedik's antics made him a popular subject for various internet memes, particularly among Generation Z.

In Temple, TX, a hacker disrupted a city council meeting during public comment and shouted expletives, racial comments, and “CCP loyalist!” The same day in Pound Ridge, N.Y., a hacker disrupted a city council meeting with pornographic images. When the issue repeated in Temple a few months later, the incident prompted the city council to stop offering the option for people to participate virtually and instead only the option to watch the council through a livestream broadcast.

== See also ==
- Photobombing
- Email bomb
- Text message bomb
- Google bombing
- Griefing
- Trolling
