= Death of Carson Price =

2019 drug-related death of 13-year old boy

- Family photograph of Price published by media outlets
- Date: 13 April 2019; 7 years ago
- Location: Ystrad Mynach, Caerphilly, Wales; 51.636504°N 3.236533°W
- Type: Child death
- Cause: Drug overdose
- Accused: 14-year-old boy
- Charges: Involuntary manslaughter; Supplying or offering to supply a controlled drug
- Verdict: Guilty
- Sentence: 1 year in a Young Offender Institution, required to pay £105 in damages

On 12 April 2019, a 13-year-old boy, Carson Price, was found unconscious in a playground in Ystrad Mynach, Glamorgan, Wales, one mile away from his home. Later being rushed to the University Hospital of Wales, Cardiff where he died upon arrival. It was confirmed that Price died after overdosing on the psychoactive drug, ecstasy, which he had purchased from an unnamed 14-year-old boy through the instant messaging app Snapchat.

== Death ==
On 12 April 2019, Price arrived at a playground in Ystrad Mynach with friends with the intent to purchase three ecstasy pills from a then 14-year-old boy that he had contacted through the messaging app Snapchat.

According to the friends who accompanied Price that day, after purchasing the pills, Price proceeded to offer one to one of friends who declined. Once asked why he was taking the drug, Price responded "Because, it's Friday night and I like the buzz." Friends who were present also reported the pills were in shape of the Nintendo video game character Donkey Kong.

Price took two halves of a pill before "acting strangely" and then collapsing to the floor. It is unknown whether it was Price's friends who contacted emergency services; however, Price was rushed to the University Hospital of Wales in Cardiff where he soon died upon arrival.

== Investigation ==
On 18 April 2019, six days after Price's death, a 15-year-old boy from Blackwood was arrested with suspicion of being the person responsible for distributing ecstasy to Price, he remained unnamed in news reports due to juvenile protection laws in Wales. The 15-year old was 14 when supplied with the drugs by a 21-year-old man whom he had contacted through Snapchat. The 15-year old told authorities that he sold drugs mainly in exchange for money and was also confirmed to have carried a knife in purpose of self-defence, which is illegal in the United Kingdom, and additionally intimidation purposes. It was confirmed that the 15-year old had sold drugs to Price, a week prior to April 12.

It was discovered, that a few hours after Price's death, the 14-year-old boy attempted to be supplied with more ecstasy from the 21-year old supplier, messaging him "Reckon you can scrap me three pills until Saturday?"

On 28 July 2020, a year after Price's death, the 15-year-old pleaded guilty to involuntary manslaughter and supplying or offering to supply a class-A drug, and was sentenced to one year in a juvenile correction facility and to pay £105 in damages.

== Reaction ==
Following his death, a vigil was organized by his friends and held at the park which Price died, which was attended by his parents and brother. Schools across Wales and mainly in Ystrad Mynach, increased lessons which informed pupils about the dangers of drugs and held school assemblies commemorating Price, local government increased investigation on drug-related crime.

Lewis Boys and Lewis Girls comprehensive schools remained open over the following Easter holidays, in which schools would typically be closed, if students, parents or staff needed support if affected by Price's death.

Snapchat, the messaging service which was used by Price to communicate with the then 14-year-old, increased encouragement towards users to report activities on the service relating to the distribution and purchasing of drugs.

== See also ==
- Death of Leah Betts
- Anna Wood
- Rachel Whitear
- Illegal drug trade
- Drug overdose
