= Randy Johnston (model) =

American model

- Born: Randell Robert Johnston; September 25, 1988; Waterford, Connecticut, U.S
- Died: October 11, 2008 (aged 20); New London, Connecticut, U.S

Randy Johnston (September 25, 1988 – October 11, 2008) was an American model. He was represented by the Ford NY modeling agency and was best known for his starring in the fall 2007 Dior Homme advertising campaign.

Johnston was born in Waterford, Connecticut, United States and is of German and English descent. He was a successful model, best known for his roles as the last "Dior Boy" and a 2008 Levi's ad campaign he did alongside models Rachel Clark and Shannan Click. His last known modeling gig was an appearance in the November 2008 issue of the i-D magazine with Lara Stone. Randy was also a talented multi-instrumentalist who played drums, bass, and guitar. Member of two bands, The Electric Noise Act and Soviet Tribe, Johnston was involved in the Connecticut indie rock and punk scene.

Outside of modeling, Johnston involved himself in hobbies such as skateboarding, reading, writing poetry, prose, and sketching. He also had a passion for film photography and would often photograph friends and his hometown city's architecture on TMax400 black and white film. After modeling, he had hoped to begin a career as a professional photographer.

After a dedicated and sincere attempt at quitting drug use, Johnston relapsed. After three months of sobriety, he died suddenly in New London, Connecticut on October 11, 2008 around 5pm Eastern Standard Time. He was 20 years old. The cause of death was a drug overdose, which was ruled accidental.

== See also ==
- List of deaths from drug overdose and intoxication
