= Close-Up (toothpaste) =

American brand of toothpaste

Close-up
- Product type: Toothpaste
- Current owner: Church & Dwight (United States); Unilever (rest of the world)
- Country: United States
- Introduced: 1967; 59 years ago
- Markets: Worldwide
- Tagline: The Closer, The Better (2007)
- Website: https://www.unilever.com/brands/personal-care/close-up/

Close-Up is an American brand of toothpaste launched in 1967 by Unilever as the first gel toothpaste. The brand is marketed worldwide by Unilever and licensed since 2003 to Church & Dwight for the North American market.

Close-Up toothpaste is also available in the Philippines, Pakistan, Peru, Argentina, Vietnam, Sri Lanka, India, Iran, Brazil, Russia, Nigeria, Indonesia, Bangladesh and Egypt. It is one of the top brands in terms of sales in India. The brand is positioned to target the youth segment with a lifestyle appeal in its advertising campaigns. According to an August 2016 report in The Economic Times, Close-Up was in the second spot in market share of toothpaste in India during January–June 2015 as well as January–June 2016.

The Close-Up toothpaste brand was considered the #1 toothpaste brand in Nigeria until early 2016 when a new brand Oral-B entered the market sold by American company, Procter & Gamble, and it has since been a competition between the two companies for the toothpaste market in Nigeria.

== See also ==
- Close-Up Forever Summer concert deaths
- List of toothpaste brands
