= Phoenician Club =

The Phoenician Club is a former entertainment venue in Sydney, Australia. It was located in Ultimo, New South Wales at the corner of Broadway and Mountain Street, opposite St Barnabas Church. The venue itself had gone through various uses and had different names before it became the Phoenician Club, a meeting place for Sydney's Maltese community, in 1980. Before then, the building and the club had existed separately. The Phoenician Club had existed as a social organisation since 1963. The building had at various times functioned as a cinema and television studio, among other roles. The Phoenician Club became well known for hosting rock concerts, which provided its owners with a steady source of income for running community activities. It was a popular venue for both Australian and overseas groups and many concerts took place at the club during its history. Following the death of Anna Wood, a high school student who died from taking the drug ecstasy while attending a rave party at the venue, significant restrictions were imposed on the club, eventually leading to its closure in 1998.

== History ==
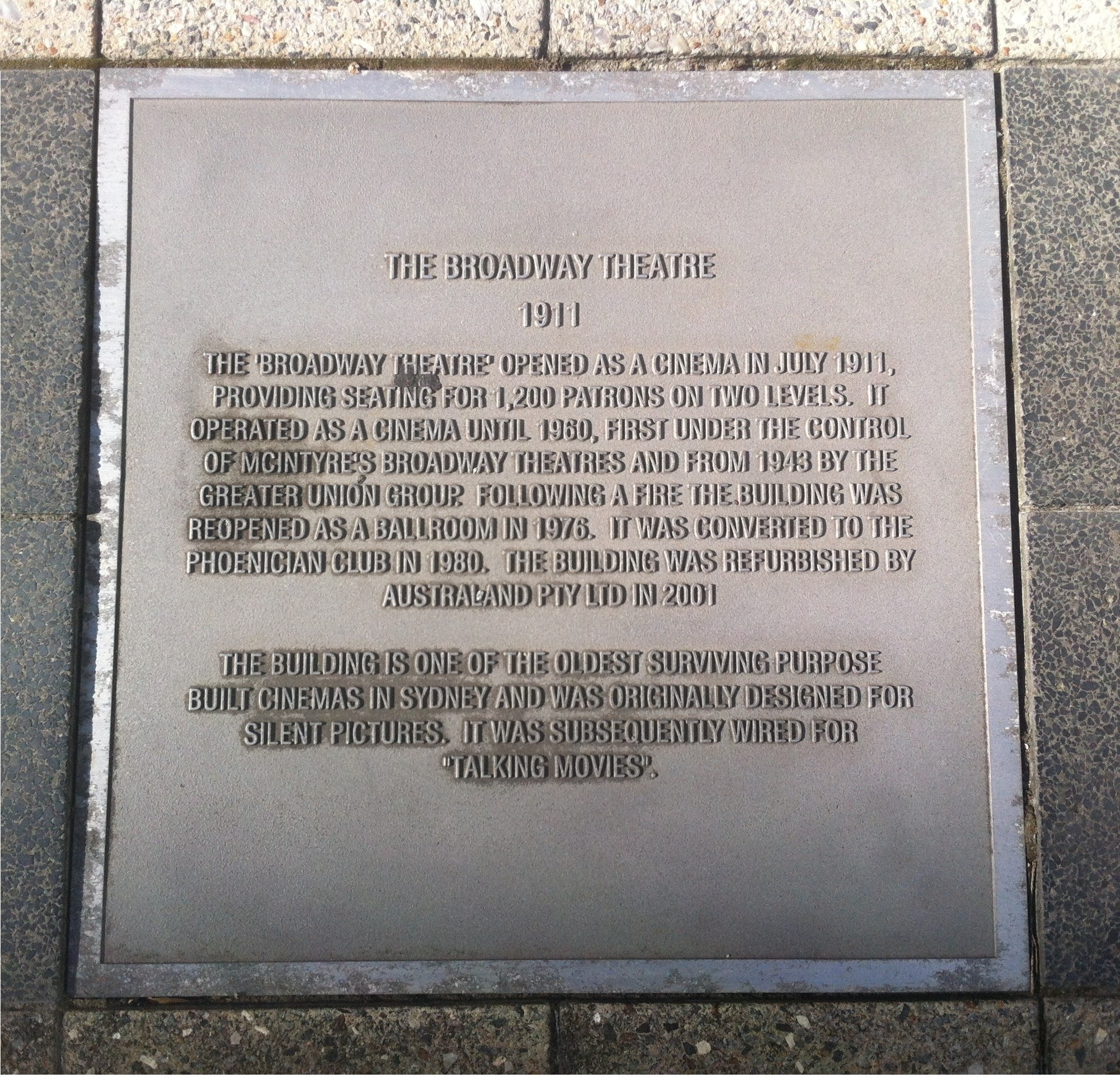
Plaque erected on former site of the Phoenician Club, commemorating its history and its earlier functions.

The premises opened as the Broadway Theatre in 1911, initially screening silent films. It was later rewired for sound when talking movies became widespread in the late 1920s. Until its redevelopment in 2001, the building had been one of the oldest surviving purpose-built cinemas in Sydney. The building operated as a cinema until 1960.

The premises were run as a discothèque called Jonathan's Disco from 1968 to 1972 and is notable in the history of the Australian pop band Sherbet, who played a formative eight-month residency there during 1970. It was here that they were first seen by their future manager Roger Davies. Sherbet shared residency at the venue with the group Fraternity and AC/DC also played at the venue during this period. Following a fire at the premises in 1972, the building was derelict until it was re-opened as a ballroom in 1976. In 1980, Sydney City Council granted consent for the Maltese community to take over the premises as the Phoenician Club. By becoming a licensed venue, the premises' role as a major music venue in Sydney significantly expanded. This gave the club a reliable source of revenue for its community activities.

The Phoenician Club became a popular rock venue in the 1980s, hosting many concerts by both local and overseas groups. Simulations of Manchester techno dance parties were held at the club in 1991. In January 1992, Nirvana played their first Australian show there. It became the focus of a major public controversy in 1995 following the death of Sydney teenager Anna Wood, who died from a cerebral oedema after taking the drug ecstasy while attending a rave dance party at the venue. The club survived calls for it to be immediately closed down in the ensuing public fall-out over Wood's death. Fines and restrictions imposed on it by the courts and Office of Liquor, Gaming and Racing significantly reduced its role as a major music venue. The club eventually closed down in 1998 with the building once again becoming derelict. It was redeveloped in 2001 and has since re-opened with new commercial occupants.
