= Death of Lauren Smith-Fields =

2021 death in Bridgeport, Connecticut

Lauren Smith-Fields (January 23, 1998 – December 12, 2021) was a woman living in Bridgeport, Connecticut. On the morning of Sunday, December 12, 2021, she was allegedly found unresponsive in bed by her Bumble date, Matthew LaFountain.

== Background ==
Smith-Fields was aged 23 and on a date with a Bumble date, Matthew LaFountain, at the time of her death. He found her unresponsive at around 6 a.m. Immediately calling 9-1-1, he started chest compressions as advised by the operator. These efforts would prove to be unsuccessful and she was pronounced dead at the scene. First responders noted that her date seemed "shaken up" and in a state of shock. Although there is skepticism surrounding her death, her death was ultimately ruled an accidental overdose caused by fentanyl and alcohol mixing.

== Controversy ==
Many people, including Smith-Fields' family, believe that the police department in charge of handling the case did not do enough or conduct a proper investigation. Some believe her date may be responsible for her death but he was cleared upon questioning. Her brother stated "When I asked the officer about the guy, he said he was a very nice guy and they weren't looking into him anymore…it was almost like he was sticking up for him and it seemed weird to hear that from a detective". Smith-Fields' family feels the police department did not explore her date as a suspect far enough. Some say this incident did not receive as much attention or care as it would have if Smith-Fields were a white woman, calling this situation another example of institutionalized racism and a lack of care for black lives, especially after the Smith-Fields' family was told to stop contacting police for updates.

== Aftermath ==
Smith-Fields' family organized a protest outside of Morton Government Center, and the detectives in charge of her case were put on leave and/or resigned. The detectives were reinstated upon appeal of the suspensions. The case is still open and has been reassigned to other officers.

== See also ==
- List of unsolved deaths
- List of deaths from drug overdose and intoxication
