= Twomad =

Canadian YouTuber and live streamer (2000–2024)

twomad
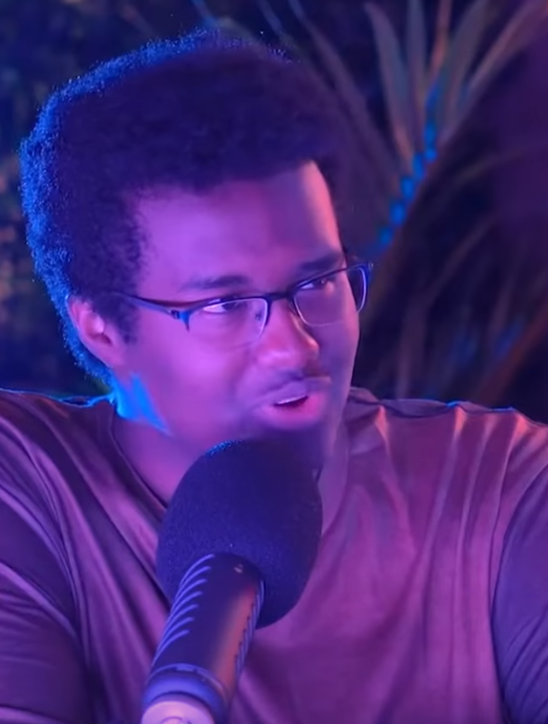
- Sedik in 2019 on the Cold Ones Podcast
- Born: Muudea Sedik; December 17, 2000; Winnipeg, Manitoba, Canada
- Died: February 13, 2024 (aged 23); Los Angeles, California, U.S.
- Occupations: YouTuber; live streamer; internet personality

YouTube information
- Channels: twomad; threemad; twomadgang9324
- Years active: 2016–2024
- Subscribers: 2.1 million (main channel); 2.03 million (second channel); 259 thousand (third channel)
- Views: 304 million (main channel); 222.9 million (second channel); 15.7 million (third channel)
- Last updated: June 19, 2026

Muudea Sedik (December 17, 2000 – February 13, 2024), better known online as twomad, was a Canadian YouTuber and live streamer based in Los Angeles. He created his second YouTube channel in 2016 and his main channel in 2017. He made gaming videos mainly about Overwatch before becoming known as an Internet troll. Several clips of himself became Internet memes, which allowed him to gain a following online. In February 2024, Sedik was found dead in his residence due to a morphine overdose.

== Life and career ==
=== Early life and career beginnings ===
Muudea Sedik was born on December 17, 2000, in Canada to an Ethiopian family. As a teenager, Sedik started gaining followers online after posting comedic videos of gameplay footage on YouTube and Reddit. When he was 16, Sedik dropped out of school and became a full-time YouTuber. While he created his first YouTube channel in April 2016, his main channel was created in August 2017.

=== Virality ===
In 2019, a short clip of Sedik saying "Goodnight girl, I'll see you tomorrow" and abruptly falling over became an Internet meme, eventually spreading to social media platforms such as Instagram and Twitter. He began livestreaming on Twitch early that same year, where he played video games. After being banned from the platform, Sedik would eventually start livestreaming on YouTube.

In the following years, Sedik became known as an Internet troll, gaining a reputation for being outlandish and having awkward online encounters. He became the principal inspiration to other YouTubers such as AndyMotion. The website Passionfru.it stated he was known for his cringe comedy, calling his content "a fever dream made for teenagers".

=== Zoombombing ===
Sedik garnered further attention during the COVID-19 pandemic. In April 2020, Sedik partook in the act of zoombombing, which he would livestream, helping him further gain popularity. One of the resulting videos became his most popular video on his YouTube channel, resulting in BBC News showing clips from it in a report on zoombombing. Passionfru.it credited him with popularizing the trend. In 2020, Sedik's YouTube channel rose from 960,000 to 2.2 million subscribers, and he had over 844,000 followers on Twitter.

=== Controversies ===
In 2019, Sedik was criticized by K-pop fans and accused of racism after portraying BTS member Jimin in a video by performing yellowface in which he wore light East Asian skin toned makeup and a blonde wig. In 2021, Sedik attended a BTS concert wearing an Asian conical hat while holding an edited photograph blending the faces of BTS member V and communist leader Mao Zedong, joking that it depicted his father. In 2023, Sedik received more criticism after posting a photo of Brianna Ghey, who was a recently murdered transgender teenager at the time, stating she was his girlfriend. Also in 2023, Twitter user Goldibell revealed screenshots of alleged conversations Sedik had with her that contained sexually explicit messages. She later alleged that he had sexually assaulted her, and shared more screenshots showing him spamming her inbox and harassing her using burner accounts. On July 6, she filed an application for a restraining order against Sedik, which she received on July 28.

== Death ==
On February 13, 2024, Sedik's therapist called the Los Angeles Police Department (LAPD) to conduct a welfare check after he had not posted to his social media accounts for several days and missed an appointment with her, raising her concern. He was found dead, foaming at the mouth in his residence at the age of 23, caused by an accidental overdose. Authorities discovered drug paraphernalia at the scene. In August, the Los Angeles County Department of Medical Examiner found the cause of death to be morphine toxicity, with mitragynine use being another significant factor. His Discord profile showed the video game Overwatch 2 had been open on his computer continuously for five days before he was found.

== See also ==
- List of YouTubers
- List of deaths from drug overdose
