= Rachel Whitear =

British victim of drugs overdose

- Whitear, circa 1995
- Born: Rachel Jayne Whitear; 6 February 1979; Weymouth, Dorset, England
- Died: 10 May 2000 (aged 21); Exmouth, Devon, England
- Resting place: St. Peter Churchyard, Withington, Herefordshire, England; 52.0412°N 2.9565°W (approximate)
- Education: Graduate of Hereford Sixth Form College (two A-Levels)
- Occupations: Former student; bar worker, shop worker
- Known for: Death via heroin overdose Rachel's Story
- Parent(s): Pauline (née Scorey) Whitear (mother); Michael Holcroft (stepfather).

Rachel Jayne Whitear (6 February 1979 – 10 May 2000) was a young woman from Withington, Herefordshire, who died of a heroin overdose in Exmouth, Devon, in May 2000 at the age of 21. She had been a frequent user of the narcotic for two years, having been introduced to heroin usage by her partner, Luke Fitzgerald, in 1998.

Following Whitear's death, her parents authorised the publication of a police photograph of their daughter's flaccid and discoloured body as she was discovered clutching a syringe inside a rented bedsit approximately two days after her death. Her death and the publication of official police photographs of her body also led to a nationwide anti-drug campaign in Britain involving a 22-minute documentary titled Rachel's Story which focuses upon her life, her potential, her struggles with heroin addiction, and ultimate overdose. The particular focus of the broadcasting of this documentary was nationwide secondary schools.

The nationwide anti-drug campaign following Whitear's death has been compared to the anti-ecstasy campaigns undertaken after the 1995 deaths of English teenager Leah Betts and Australian schoolgirl Anna Wood.

== Early life ==
Rachel Jayne Whitear was born in Weymouth, Dorset, on 6 February 1979, the younger of two children born into a middle-class household. She was raised in Withington, Herefordshire, where her family relocated in 1980. Whitear had one brother. Following the separation of her parents and her mother's remarriage, she gained a stepbrother and stepsister.

As an adolescent, Whitear devoted much of her time to raising money for charitable causes by participating in sponsored activities such as walking and swimming. She is also known to have encouraged her parents to purchase The Big Issue to donate to the homeless.

Whitear obtained 10 GCSE passes in 1995. She was a pianist and a football fan.

== Teenage years ==
=== Recreational drug usage ===
Whitear began using cannabis and ecstasy at the age of 14. According to a friend named Polly North, Whitear first began smoking cannabis, before progressing to occasionally taking ecstasy, largely as a means of garnering acceptance and popularity from her peers. Nonetheless, her occasional teenage recreational drug use did not affect her studies, and her parents were initially unaware of her use of narcotics.

=== Qualifications and A-Levels ===
Following the completion of her secondary school education at Aylestone School, Whitear enrolled at Hereford Sixth Form College, where she gained two A-levels in psychology and communication studies. Five of the six universities to which she then applied to continue her studies accepted her request.

== Luke Fitzgerald ==
=== Heroin addiction ===
In November 1997, as Whitear contemplated which university to attend, she became acquainted with 24-year-old Luke Fitzgerald, who had been a heroin addict for three years. Shortly after their acquaintance, Fitzgerald phoned Whitear, asking her to date him. Whitear accepted, although shortly thereafter, Fitzgerald began actively encouraging Whitear to use the drug: initially smoking; later via injecting. (Note: According to testimony delivered at the second inquest into Whitear's death in 2007, she only began injecting heroin as opposed to smoking the drug shortly before her death.) Several months later, the father of a friend of Fitzgerald's held a confidential talk with Whitear's parents in which he informed them their daughter had confided in him she was "using heroin". Whitear was confronted about her heroin usage, but insisted she only used the drug from "time to time" in episodes she termed "slipping up".

By mid-1998, Whitear's parents had noted marked changes in their daughter's personality: she had changed from a pleasant, outgoing and exuberant young woman into an irritable, insecure and unreliable individual. Nonetheless, her mother would later insist that, although Whitear would "sell anything" to fund her habit as her addiction increased, unlike many addicts, her daughter never stole to fund her habit.

=== Counselling ===
With help from drug counsellors, Whitear occasionally managed to avoid drug consumption for extended periods of time. To her family's relief, on one occasion in 1999, she chose to re-apply for a university place, opting to study psychology and sociology at the University of Bath. In August 1999, she began studying at this university, but abandoned her studies after one term as her heroin dependency increased. Shortly thereafter, in late 1999, Whitear informed her parents she and Fitzgerald were moving from Withington to Exmouth, where they had secured a rented flat in Lyndhurst Road.

== Relocation and separation ==
By early January 2000, the two had moved to Lyndhurst Road, Exmouth, where Whitear obtained a series of low-paying jobs in locations such as a bar in Bath and a shop in Exmouth. Within weeks of this move, Whitear phoned her parents, asking to return to Herefordshire. Her parents agreed, and Whitear briefly returned to their home. Shortly thereafter, her parents returned home one evening to discover Whitear lying unresponsive on her bed; briefly unconscious from an injection of heroin.

By February 2000, Whitear had returned to Exmouth. Shortly thereafter, she informed Fitzgerald—who is known to have physically abused Whitear—that their relationship was effectively over. In May, she secretly moved into a rented room in a small, three-bedroom terrace house at 4 Pound Street, Exmouth. On Tuesday 9 May, she left Fitzgerald a note, telling him that she needed her own space "uninfluenced by anyone, to develop a new life in." She is believed to have died the following day.

Whitear's discoloured and flaccid body, as discovered by her landlord on 12 May 2000

=== Death ===
Whitear is believed to have died on Wednesday 10 May 2000. She was 21 years old. Her body was discovered by her landlord in her bedsit two days later. She is believed to have died while in the company of Fitzgerald, who would confess years later to having given Whitear the fatal dosage of heroin, and to have attempted to "clean up the scene" after she had overdosed on the drug. (Note: Some sections of the media have speculated that Whitear may have been killed by Fitzgerald.)

At the time of Whitear's death, she was actively seeking employment, had been engaging with drug counsellors and seeking medical treatment in efforts to defeat her drug addiction. In one of the final letters she is known to have penned to a friend in early 2000, she confided her struggles, stating: "I need to stop taking heroin, but it is hard. I'm absolutely dependent on it. It's destroying me: my house; my job; my relationships with my family. I have hit rock bottom."

Whitear's body was later buried in Withington, Herefordshire.

== Police investigation ==
The initial police investigation into Whitear's death was criticised for their failure to observe correct procedures, and the conclusions of the investigation—which had ruled out any form of foul play—were questioned. Fingerprints were not taken from the bedsit where Whitear had died until two weeks after police were first called to the scene and officers from the Devon and Cornwall Police force originally investigated her death without conducting a post-mortem examination upon her body. Two men—one of whom was Luke Fitzgerald—were arrested in connection with her death. However, the Crown Prosecution Service did not have sufficient evidence to pursue manslaughter charges, and both were released without charge.

A toxicology report upon Whitear's body revealed that the level of heroin in her bloodstream was 0.05 micrograms per millilitre; approximately one third of the 0.15 μg/ml generally considered to be a fatal dosage. As sufficient toxicological testing had not been conducted during the original police investigation, Whitear's mother decided her daughter's body should be exhumed in order that adequate post-mortem tests could be conducted.

=== Exhumation ===
A second—more thorough—investigation into Whitear's death was announced in February 2004. This investigation was conducted by Wiltshire Police. On 23 March, Whitear's body was exhumed and a post-mortem conducted. The results of the inquiry were presented to Doctor Elizabeth Earland, the coroner for Exeter.

== Second inquest ==
In June 2005, Earland decided against holding a fresh inquiry into Whitear's death. However, the Independent Police Complaints Commission and Wiltshire Police appealed to the High Court, prompting a fresh inquest in October 2006. This inquest was held at Devon County Hall in September 2007, and was presided by coroner Ian Arrow. The inquest heard evidence of "multiple failures" by Devon and Cornwall Police in their initial inquest into Whitear's death, and that the pathologist had chosen not to conduct a post-mortem on Whitear's body due to incorrect concerns she may have been HIV-positive.

This second inquest was unable to rule whether Whitear had administered the fatal injection of heroin herself, and returned an open verdict. Reacting to this official verdict, Whitear's parents stated: "We will never know who administered that final dose and whether Rachel was alone when she died."

"It's horrific to look at a photograph like that of your own daughter. It was a very difficult decision to release the photograph, but we thought that, if we did so, we would be using her body to help others."

— Pauline Holcroft, reflecting on her family's decision to release images of Rachel Whitear's body to the media. March 2002.

== Drug awareness campaign ==
Almost two years after Whitear's death, her parents consented to the usage of images of her body as discovered by her landlord in a nationwide anti-drug usage campaign. Two of the initiatives for her parents' decision were the desire to "make people think" about the dangers of Class A drugs, and to challenge stereotypes about drug abusers. Her parents and siblings also participated in a 22-minute documentary focusing on the life and death of Whitear named Rachel's Story, released shortly after the images of her body were released to the media.

The images and interviews within Rachel's Story illustrate the life of a normal, content and promising everyday girl, her struggles with her addiction, and the effect her drug usage had upon herself and her family. The documentary also contains the images of her body in death. The overall message conveyed is that even occasional hard drug usage could result in a similar fate to anyone.

In March 2002, Whitear's stepfather, Michael Holcroft, would elaborate on these decisions: "If we can save just one child, then we'll have succeeded."

== Art controversy ==
A painting of Whitear by artist Stella Vine, depicting Whitear dressed in a school uniform and with blood dripping from her mouth, drew condemnation from Whitear's parents in 2004 when the press reported the painting was to be included in an exhibition at the Saatchi Gallery. Reportedly, Whitear's mother and stepfather were "appalled" at the decision. However, the painting was not withdrawn from the exhibition.

Vine refused to apologise for painting the portrait, stating she had been inspired to create the artwork after researching Whitear's life and death and being unable to "get Rachel's image out of [my] head", adding she "should think that Rachel's family will believe that I gratuitously exploited her image", but that this was not her intention.

== See also ==
- Death of Anna Wood
- Death of Leah Betts
- Death of Carson Price
- Drug culture
- Drug overdose
- Drug education
- Opioid use disorder
- Illegal drug trade
- Peer pressure

== Cited works and further reading ==
- Cartwright, Peter (2020). Supporting People Through A Drug- or Alcohol-Related Death. London: Jessica Kingsley Publishers. ISBN 978-1-785-92191-9.
- Vitellone, Nicole (2017). Social Science of the Syringe: A Sociology of Injecting Drug Use. Oxfordshire: Taylor & Francis Publishing. ISBN 978-0-367-28104-5.
- Woods, Neil; Rafaeli, J. S. (2018). Drug Wars: The Terrifying Inside Story of Britain's Drug Trade. London: Ebury Publishing. ISBN 978-1-785-03745-0.
