= Lisa Matsumoto =

American dramatist

Lisa Matsumoto (August 26, 1964 - December 14, 2007) was a playwright and children's author in Hawaii. Her use of Hawaiian Pidgin in her works propelled her to her status as one of the state's most popular resident playwrights.

== Career ==
Matsumoto began writing plays while studying drama and theater at the University of Hawaii in the late 1980s, taking Western fairy tales and rewriting them in Pidgin, while also changing their plots in unexpected ways. Her first play, "Bye Bye Hanabata Days", was written as a class assignment; her next play, "Once Upon One Time", began a series of pidgin fairy tale plays which would include sequels "Once Upon One Noddah Time" and "Once Upon One Kapakahi Time", as well as "Happily Eva Afta" and "On Dragonfly Wings". In 1995, she founded ‘Ōhi‘a Productions, a company which still produces some of her shows; she and her cousin Michael Furuya jointly chose the name, which refers to the plant Metrosideros polymorpha, known locally as "ʻōhiʻa lehua". However, she began to move beyond her standard formula with "The Princess and the Iso Peanut", first performed at the Diamond Head Theatre in July 1999. "The Princess and the Iso Peanut", based on the Hans Christian Andersen fairy tale "The Princess and the Pea", was her first not to include some of her stock characters such as Da Mean Mongoose, which she had previously used to generate "simple ethnic comedy". She received numerous awards for her work, including four Po’okela Awards from the Hawai'i State Theatre Council, and a fellowship from the Hawaii State Foundation on Culture and the Arts.

== Death ==
Matsumoto was driving her Toyota Camry at about 3:32 AM on 14 December 2007 on Interstate H-1 the wrong way on the Waianae-bound side of the highway when she collided head-on with a black 1998 Toyota Corolla travelling in the correct direction. The driver Matsumoto hit, Cassie Olaivar, survived with multiple injuries, requiring hospitalization and surgery. Another driver, a 21-year-old male, crashed his car as a result of avoiding a head-on collision with Matsumoto, moments prior to Matsumoto hitting Olaivar. Matsumoto was taken to The Queen's Medical Center, where she was later declared dead; her autopsy found that she had been intoxicated at the time of the crash. The Medical Examiner's Office reported that at the time of the accident, Matsumoto had a blood alcohol content of .242, which is more than three times the legal limit of .08. Her relatives stated through a family friend that her funeral would be held in 2008.

The memorial service for Matsumoto was held on Sunday, January 13, 2008, at the Ko'olau Golf Club.

Matsumoto was remembered at the 2010 performance of "The Princess and the Iso Peanut" at the Hawaii Theatre Center.
