= John Henry (toxicologist) =

English toxicologist (1939–2007)

John Anthony Henry
- Born: 11 March 1939; Greenwich, England
- Died: 8 May 2007 (aged 68)
- Scientific career
- Fields: Toxicology

John Anthony Henry (11 March 1939, Greenwich, England – 8 May 2007) was a professor specialising in toxicology in the Faculty of Medicine, Imperial College London, at St Mary's Hospital in Paddington. He conducted research on the health effects of cannabis, cocaine and other recreational drugs.

== Family and childhood ==
Henry was born in Greenwich on 11 March 1939, and was the eldest of four surviving children. His father, Irish doctor John Aloysius Henry, was a general practitioner, and was the team doctor for Millwall Football Club, which gave the young John a lifelong interest in English football.

== Education ==
Henry was educated first at St Joseph's Academy, Blackheath, run by the De La Salle brothers. He attended Medical School at King's College London, and joined Opus Dei as a twenty-year-old medical student, there as a "numerary", a celibate member. Throughout the rest of his life, he attended mass daily, and set aside two periods a day for prayer and meditation.

== Illness, involvement with St. Josemaria, and recovery ==
In 1969, while vacationing in Italy, Henry developed a throat infection which was inadequately treated, and caused kidney failure. His doctors thought it unlikely that he could survive long on dialysis, and he retired from medicine for five years. During this period, he became director of Netherhall House, a student hall in Hampstead where he was the director from 1967 until 1970.

St. Josemaria Escriva let it be known that he was praying that Henry would find a matching kidney, and Henry recovered due to a successful transplant in 1976. Henry always believed that his kidney and his recovery came about through Escriva's intercession.

== Return to medicine and media appearances ==
Henry then returned to his career in medicine as a registrar at Guy's Hospital, where he showed great compassion for his patients. In 1982, he was appointed consultant to the National Poisons Unit at Guy's, where he was successful in saving many lives, especially those of children who had ingested poisonous household products. He carried out research in toxicology to discover how those poisons worked and how to counteract them.

Henry was able to explain medical matters in layman terms, and was well versed in all aspects of drugs and poisons.

He took a special interest in the damage done to young people's lives by illegal drugs. He insisted that cannabis was much more devastating than simple tobacco, taking away the user's free-will and dignity, and destroying personalities and damaging society.

He also explained how ecstasy (MDMA) and amphetamines could cause death by hyperpyrexia and dehydration. He was among the first to claim that the dangers of ecstasy were underestimated, and he briefly had the nickname "Mr E". He was called as an expert witness for the inquest into the death of Leah Betts, who died after drinking too much water after taking an ecstasy tablet at her 18th birthday party, and whose case became a cause célèbre.

== Death ==
In April 2007, Henry's transplanted kidney failed, and he went to hospital to have it removed. He appeared to be recovering well, but died of internal hemorrhaging.

== Toxicology ==
During the 2004 Ukrainian elections, he noted that the opposition candidate Viktor Yushchenko could have been poisoned using dioxins.

He was the clinical toxicologist who dealt with the poisoning case of Russian dissident Alexander Litvinenko (at University College Hospital) in November 2006. Initially, he suggested poisoning from the metal thallium, although it later turned out that the toxin was polonium-210.

== Television ==
Professor Henry appeared numerous times on television, including Channel 4's Equinox, and Sky One's documentary entitled Poisoned – which primarily concentrated on the case of Ukrainian President Viktor Yushchenko. On one occasion Professor Henry even appeared on Da Ali G Show, having been told it was an educational programme, and talked about the dangers of hard drugs, brushing aside the jokes made at his expense. He last featured on an episode of Horizon, "A Perfect Murder", in which he talked about the poisonings of Litvinenko and Yushchenko. The episode aired at 21:00 on 8 May 2007 – the same day that he died – and the programme makers acknowledged his death at the end of the credits.

== Other sources ==
- The Times:Obituary - 14 May 2007
- The Daily Telegraph:Obituary - 12 May 2007
- The Guardian:Litvinenko poisoning:the main players - 24 November 2006
- Netherhall House
