= Sue Morgan =

Sue Morgan may refer to:

- Sue Morgan (Hollyoaks), a character in the TV series Hollyoaks
- Sue Morgan (rower) (born 1952), American rower
