= Bronwyn Donaghy =

Australian author

Bronwyn Donaghy (21 December 1948 – 23 July 2002) was an Australian author whose non-fiction work concerned adolescence, particularly drug use among teenagers, teen sexuality and teen suicide. Her 1996 book, Anna's Story, about the death of 15-year-old Sydney teenager Anna Wood, became a national bestseller. The book sold over 100,000 copies and was reprinted in 2005. Her other works included Leaving Early, about youth suicide, and Unzipped, about sexuality among teenagers.

== Early life ==
Donaghy was born in Newcastle, New South Wales. Her father worked as an insurance agent and the family moved often, spending large amounts of time in both Tamworth and Lismore. After her completion of high school, she trained as a journalist at Lismore's Northern Star newspaper and began her journalistic career.

== Career ==
After Donaghy's work in Lismore, she joined Network Ten in the late 1960s to work as a researcher and reporter. She also presented Sunday Magazine and Young World. In the early 1970s, she travelled to England and began work in London, on trade publications. She returned to Sydney in 1973. After a hiatus from journalism to prioritise her family and raise her children, she began freelance writing, specialising in family issues. Donaghy's work appeared in The Sydney Morning Herald, Australia's Parents magazine and New Woman. Donaghy also wrote a long-standing column, under the pseudonym Frances Storm.

In late 1995, Donaghy was approached by editor Jennie Orchard at HarperCollins to write a book about Anna Wood, who had died in October 1995. Wood had been at a rave with friends in Ultimo, where she had taken an ecstasy tablet and collapsed. Her friends drove her to their home in Sydney's Northern Suburbs, where they put her to bed, hoping she would sleep off the effects of a bad pill. Unbeknown to them, Wood had suffered hyponatremia, dangerously low salt levels, as the result of excessive water consumption. Her brain had swelled and she collapsed into a coma the following morning. Donaghy was reluctant to pursue the story, and approached the project with caution. After meeting Anna Wood's mother, Angela, she was struck by the normality of the family. Donaghy noticed the possibility of a recurrence which she felt would strike a chord with the Australian public–particularly teenage girls. The book questions the duality of teenage freedom and parental restrictions, as well as Wood's portrayal of a wholesome, albeit slightly insecure and unsure girl next door. The book highlighted the urgency of a dialogue between parents and their children about illicit drug use, which was an issue of increasing importance in Australia at the time–up until Wood's death, there had only been one other reported death from ecstasy.

Anna's Story was released in 1996 and became a best-seller. It was translated in German and sold in Europe. In Australia, it has sold over 130,000 copies (2018). The success of the book led to Donaghy's covering of two other adolescent health issues: teenage depression and suicide, in Leaving Early (1997). Her following work, Unzipped: Everything Teenagers want to know about Love, Sex and Each Other (1999) was covered with a humorous approach. These three books are Donaghy's most well known works, however she published two more books in the 1990s: Keeping Mum: Stories of Happy Parenting and Other Lies, (1997), was a tongue-in-cheek book written as a guide for parents highlighting relationships and trust in teens and adults. Donaghy had also penned a children's fairy tale called Two and a Half Wishes.

== Death ==
Donaghy was diagnosed with a bone marrow disorder (myelodysplasia aplastic anaemia) in 1999 and became dependent on blood transfusions in 2002. Donaghy had been scheduled to receive a bone marrow transplant in August 2002. She died on 23 July 2002 surrounded by family.

== Personal life ==
Donaghy met her husband, a Northern Irish physicist, in London in the 1970s. They married in Sydney and had three children.
