= Anna Wood (born 1980) =

Australian schoolgirl (1980–1995)

- Wood, depicted on a promotional badge for an anti-drugs campaign that her father organised following her death
- Born: Anna Victoria Wood; 27 May 1980; Southport, Queensland, Australia
- Died: 24 October 1995 (aged 15); St Leonards, New South Wales, Australia
- Known for: Death following ecstasy use

Anna Victoria Wood (27 May 1980 – 24 October 1995) was an Australian teenager who died after consuming an ecstasy tablet at a rave party in inner Sydney. Her cause of death was hypoxic encephalopathy, following acute water intoxication secondary to ingestion of MDMA.

Wood's death was covered widely in the news media, produced debate on drug use among adolescents and inspired the memoir Anna's Story (1996) by Bronwyn Donaghy.

== Events leading up to death ==
Wood had recently left The Forest High School after completing Year 10 to pursue a career in beauty therapy at a salon near her home in Sydney's North Shore. On 21 October 1995, Wood and a group of school friends attended an "Apache" rave dance party at the Phoenician Club on Broadway in Ultimo, in inner-city Sydney. She had told her parents that she was going to a friend's house to have a sleepover. Wood and her friends bought and consumed ecstasy tablets from a female friend outside the club prior to entering. At approximately 5:00 a.m. on 22 October, Wood began feeling unwell inside the club and was seen rushing to the toilets, where she was found vomiting. Her friends drove her back to one of their homes in Belrose where she was put to bed. Wood's symptoms showed no signs of improving: there were continued episodes of dry retching, intermittent sleep, confusion and possible convulsion-like movements, followed by a lapse into unconsciousness. At 10:00 a.m. Wood's parents were informed, who called for an ambulance and had her taken to the Royal North Shore Hospital in St Leonards. Wood remained in a coma throughout the period and did not regain consciousness; she died on Tuesday, 24 October 1995 after her life support was turned off following the declaration that she was brain dead.

== Coroner's report ==
The subsequent coroner's report determined that the cause of death was a cerebral edema caused by water intoxication (hyponatraemia) secondary to use of MDMA. Hyponatraemia occurs when excessive fluid consumption dilutes sodium levels in the blood supply, leading to water absorption in the body's cells. Absorption of too much water causes cell swelling, which in the brain can cause irreparable damage as the human skull leaves little room for expansion inside. The brain's functions are also disrupted by cell swelling, resulting in respiratory arrest among other symptoms. The syndrome of inappropriate antidiuretic hormone hypersecretion (SIADH) that occurs in some users of MDMA can compound hyponatraemia by disrupting the body's normal response of releasing excess water by excretion.

The coroner recommended improved drug education information stressing the need for immediate medical attention if a user of MDMA became ill under its influence. J. A. Henry, a British physician from the Medical Toxicology Unit at Guy's Hospital, noted that British recommendations for appropriate water consumption for MDMA users stressed the different needs of users who were dancing strenuously and those who were not.

== Aftermath and media coverage ==
Wood's death was widely reported in the media and represented a change in how ecstasy-related stories were covered. Whereas previous ecstasy-related incidents had received minimal coverage and were reported in the context of crime, delinquency and secrecy, Wood's "girl next door" image, and death, was extensively covered and turned into a warning against illicit drug-use in society. It was initially put forward in the media that the ecstasy tablet taken by Wood was probably laced with heroin or morphine, the purported cause of her death, but the coroner's report determined that only MDMA was present in Wood's body.

Wood's funeral took place on 1 November 1995 at the Northern Suburbs Memorial Gardens.

The initial coverage of the event was soon followed by media stories ranging from concerns about drug use in Australian teenagers to attacks on techno music and raves for their corrupting influence on youth. The Phoenician Club in particular was singled out, with calls to have the venue closed down, a move endorsed by the then-NSW Premier, Bob Carr. In the event, the club was allowed to continue to run but it had to abandon hosting dance parties. The death of Anna Wood also fuelled perceptions that drug-taking was a serious problem among Australian teenagers, even though a NSW AMA report from the time established that only 3% of 14- to 19-year-olds had used ecstasy. Rave culture in Australia and Wood's death was documented on the popular Australian television news program 60 Minutes in 1996, creating further debate.

The intensity of the media coverage can be explained to a degree by Wood's appearance as an average, middle-class "good girl" whose life had been tragically taken from her. She did not fit the stereotype of the street-living junkie and so was turned into an object of sympathy instead. She was the child that "everyone could relate to", and, as a result, was used as a warning to prevent incidents. Wood's death was sympathetically covered by Bronwyn Donaghy in a book on the event entitled Anna's Story in 1996. It raised similar concerns in the media that drug-taking was a problem among youth and argued against drug decriminalisation as a response to Wood's death.

While her death renewed calls for a more hardline approach to be taken on drugs in the media and by politicians, Jack Marx of The Age pointed out that this "zero tolerance" approach may have scared Wood's friends into not taking her immediately to a hospital where her life could have been saved.

Wood's death nevertheless raised awareness about ecstasy use in the general community, which until that time had been less well known in Australia. Her death was seen as unusual because in 1995 the number of people who had died from ecstasy use was very low. The raised awareness of ecstasy use led to the Australian state governments instituting new laws in the running of dance venues. In NSW, the Code of Practice for Dance Parties was passed in 1997, which made the provision of chill rooms and free water compulsory for clubs to obtain their licence. This was seen as an acknowledgement of the reality of ecstasy use in the dance scene and the need for pragmatic legislation by governments to prevent further deaths. The coroner's report into Wood's death had also recommended public advice on ecstasy use and water intake to avoid further water intoxication fatalities.

The notoriety of Wood's death saw it continue to surface in the public after the turn of the century. It was referred to during the 2007 NSW state election, for instance, when NSW Opposition Leader Peter Debnam used it and some other youth deaths to claim the state government was not doing enough to prevent further tragedies. Her death often resurfaces in the Australian media when other Australian teenagers die after taking ecstasy. In November 2015 (after the death of a Sydney woman at the Stereosonic music festival), Wood's father stated that "[he] hoped Anna's death would make a difference, but we are not making progress against drugs. I think the pro-legalisation lobby has a lot to answer for. They keep on about harm reduction. They say just take the stuff safely. But there is no safe way. You just don’t know what will happen when you take drugs."

== See also ==
- Illegal drug trade
- Death of Leah Betts, a similar case
- Death of Carson Price
- Rachel Whitear
- Responsible drug use
- War on drugs
