= Susan Morgan (writer) =

English author

(undated)

Susan Morgan (pen names: Zoe Barnes, Sue Dyson, Sophie Danson, Valentina Cilescu, and Anastasia Dubois) (20 July 1957 – 31 October 2009) of Cheltenham was a best-selling English author of chick lit genre. She published 45 novels and also translated books into French.

== Biography ==
Susan Morgan was born near Liverpool to a Manx mother and Yorkshire father. Her chick lit novels, written under the pen name of Zoe Barnes, include, Bouncing Back, Bumps, Hitched, Hot Property, Ex-Appeal, Love Bug and Just Married and she is classed as an originator of this written genre. She also wrote erotic fantasy and vampire novels under the names Sophie Danson, Valentina Cilescu and Anastasia Dubois. She also translated French novels (including those of Christian Jacq) under the pen name of Sue Dyson. Sue was also one of a small number of translators who, following a worldwide search, were given the task of translating Van Gogh's French language letters for the prestigious Van Gogh Letters Project for the Van Gogh Museum in Amsterdam. Morgan was a singer (mezzo-soprano) and had been a member of Equity. She suffered from Tolosa–Hunt syndrome and Marinesco–Sjögren syndrome. She faced many surgeries following a motorcycling accident in her youth, and combined with her autoimmune diseases, she experienced constant pain.

Suffering from depression due to a marital breakup, Morgan died by suicide while on holiday on the Isle of Man in 2009 at the age of 52. She was survived by her husband Simon Morgan.
