= Death of Leah Betts =

1995 death of an English woman

Leah Betts
- A November 1995 photograph of Leah Betts in a coma, which was widely circulated in the media
- Born: 11 November 1977; Essex, England
- Died: 16 November 1995 (aged 18); Chelmsford, Essex, England

Leah Sarah Betts (11 November 1977 – 16 November 1995) was an English girl from Latchingdon, Essex, who became a prominent figure in discussions about drug use in the United Kingdom following her death shortly after her 18th birthday. On 11 November 1995, during her birthday celebration at home, Betts consumed an ecstasy (MDMA) tablet and subsequently drank approximately 7 litres (1.8 US gal) of water within a 90-minute period.

Four hours later, she collapsed into a coma and was admitted to hospital, where she remained until her death on 16 November. The inquest concluded that her death resulted from water intoxication leading to hyponatremia, causing fatal swelling of the brain; it was suggested that the ecstasy tablet may have impaired her body's ability to regulate water balance.

Her case drew extensive media attention, partly because she came from a middle-class family, which defied the stereotype of drug users. A prominent anti-drug campaign used her photo with the slogan "Sorted", but critics said such words were too one-sided, giving the impression that her death was caused merely by "one ecstasy tablet". The police spent £300,000 investigating the source of the drugs but only brought minor charges against her friends.

== Initial press and public reaction ==
When Leah Betts was first admitted to hospital in a coma, her family released her image to the national media as an example of the dangers of illegal drugs, specifically ecstasy, in an attempt to deter other young people from using drugs. This campaigning continued for years following her death.

Betts's mother, Dorothy, had died of a heart attack three years earlier, aged 45. Following this, Betts lived with her father (Metropolitan Police officer), her stepmother (Nurse), and her younger brother.

That Betts's life was typical of middle-class families in Britain was a likely factor in the widespread coverage of her death. Not long after her death, a 1,500-site poster campaign used a photograph of Leah Betts (not a picture of her on her deathbed, as some sources erroneously claim) with the caption "Sorted: Just one ecstasy tablet took Leah Betts".

Alternative rock band Chumbawamba responded with their own "anti-poster" reading "Distorted: you are just as likely to die from eating a bay leaf as from an ecstasy tablet".

== Death and inquest ==
Betts died on the morning of 16 November 1995, five days after being admitted to hospital, when her life support machine was switched off. Her funeral took place on 1 December 1995 at Christ Church, Latchingdon. She was buried alongside her mother at St Mary Magdalen church in Great Burstead, Essex. Some of her organs were donated when she died.

A subsequent inquest determined that her death was not directly caused by the consumption of ecstasy, but rather the result of the large quantity of water she had consumed. She apparently had read an advisory warning commonly given to ravers which stated drinking water would help her avoid dehydration as a result of continuous dancing. Leah had been at home with friends and had not been dancing, yet consumed about 7 litres (12 imp pt; 1.8 US gal) of water in less than 90 minutes. This resulted in water intoxication and hyponatremia, which in turn led to serious swelling of the brain, irreparably damaging it.

However, the ecstasy tablet may have reduced her ability to urinate, exacerbating her hyponatremia; a symptom known as SIADH. At the inquest, it was stated by toxicologist John Henry, who had previously warned the public of the danger of MDMA causing death by dehydration, "If Leah had taken the drug alone, she might well have survived. If she had drunk the amount of water alone, she would have survived."

== Police response ==
Essex Police assigned 35 officers and major resources to identifying the suppliers of the tablet Betts had taken. However, after an investigation that cost £300,000, the only people charged were four of her friends who had been present at the house, two of whom accepted police cautions with the other two prosecuted. Of these, one received a conditional discharge, while the other was acquitted after a retrial.

== Subsequent events ==
After Betts's death, the media focused on the claim that it was the first time she had taken the drug. It was later determined that she had taken the drug at least three times previously. Her father, Paul, subsequently became a vocal public campaigner against drug abuse. He and his wife were present at the press conference at which Barry Legg MP launched his Public Entertainments Licences (Drug Misuse) Bill, which allowed councils to close down licensed venues if the police believed controlled drugs were being used at or near the premises.

It was reported that the £1 million Sorted posters campaign was the pro bono work of three advertising companies: Booth Lockett and Makin (media buyers), Knight Leech and Delaney (advertising agency), and FFI (youth marketing consultants). Booth Lockett and Makin counted brewers Löwenbräu as one of its major clients, at a time when the alcohol industry saw increasing MDMA use as a threat to profits. The other two companies represented energy drink Red Bull, a professional relationship that had earned Knight Leech and Delaney £5 million and was described by one of FFI's executives as such: "We do PR for Red Bull, for example, and we do a lot of clubs. It's very popular at the moment because it's a substitute for taking ecstasy."

The December 1995 murder of three alleged drug dealers in Rettendon, an event dubbed the "Range Rover murders", has been suggested by the media as a potential act of revenge for Betts's death.

== See also ==
- Anna Wood, an Australian teenager who died in similar circumstances three weeks before Betts' death
- Death of Carson Price
- Moral panic
- Overdose
- Rachel Whitear
- Recreational drug use
- Responsible drug use
- War on drugs
