= List of drug combinations =

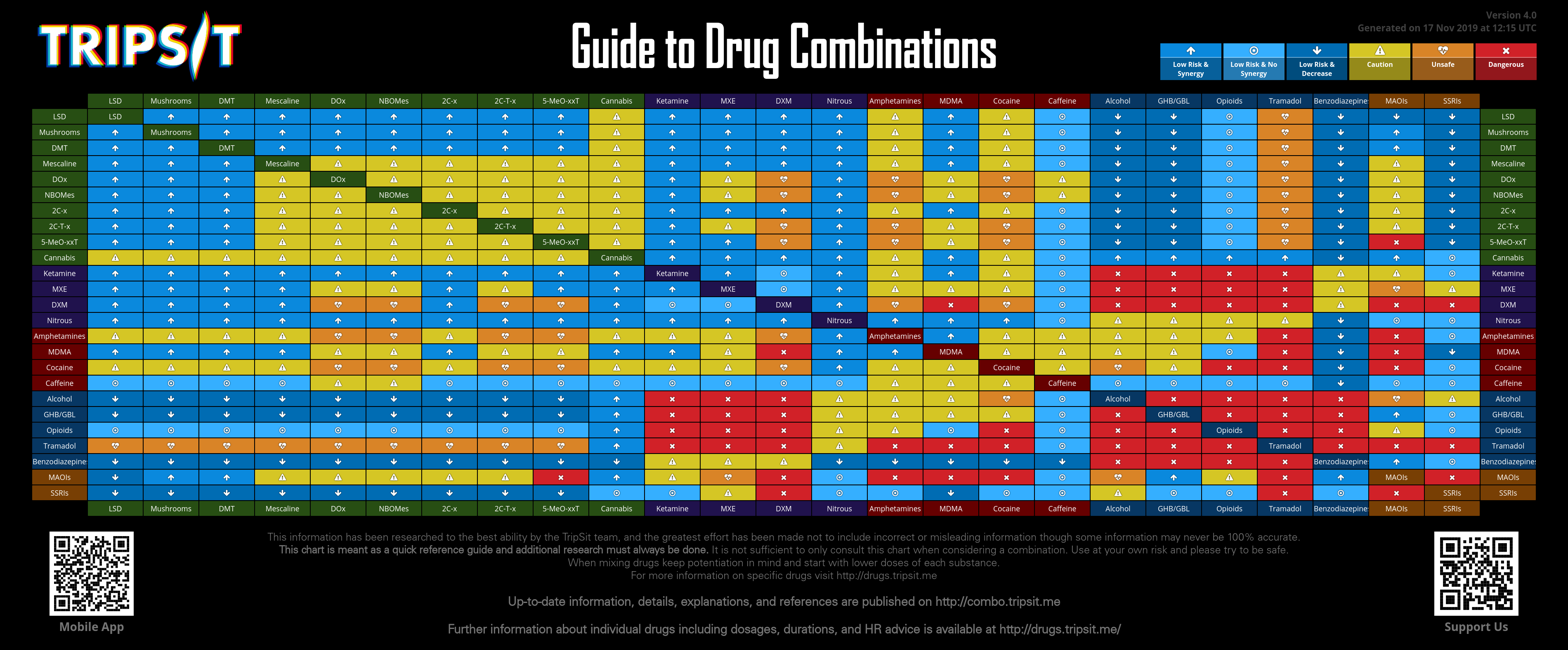
A drug combination chart designed for harm reduction by TripSit

Polysubstance use or multisubstance use is the use of combinations of psychoactive substances with both legal and illegal substances. This page lists polysubstance combinations that are entheogenic, recreational, or off-label indicated use of pharmaceuticals. For example, the over-the-counter motion sickness combination drug dimenhydrinate (8-chlorotheophylline/diphenhydramine) is occasionally used in higher doses as a deliriant. The prescription medicine Adderall (dextroamphetamine sulfate/amphetamine sulfate/dextroamphetamine saccharate/amphetamine aspartate monohydrate) is also frequently used recreationally. However, using non-prescribed drugs, using non-prescribed dose regimen, can cause polysubstance dependence, or combined drug intoxication which may lead to deaths.

== Table ==
To avoid an excessively long list, the table below only lists recreational drug combinations that are not patent medicine.

| Drug 1 | Drug 2 | Drug 3 | Drug 4 | Polysubstance slang, or brand name | Intoxication name | Comment |
|---|---|---|---|---|---|---|
| Any dissociative | Any dissociative | | | Void flip | Void flipping | |
| Any dissociative | DMT | | | Dime bar, angel flip | Dimension flipping, angel flipping | |
| Any depressant | Any stimulant | | | Speedball, powerball, over and under | Powerballing, speedballing | |
| Any pharmaceutical | Any pharmaceutical | | | Polypharmacy | Pharming | Polypharmacy is most commonly defined as the use of five or more medications daily by an individual. However, the definition of polypharmacy is still debated and can vary from two to 11 concurrent medications. |
| Any drug | Cannabis | | | Amp joint | | |
| Any β-Carboline containing plant (e.g. Banisteriopsis caapi or Peganum harmala) | DMT | | | Ayahuasca, Changa | | Ayahuasca is drunk. Changa is smoked or vaped. |
| Any antiretroviral drug | Black tar heroin | | | Whoonga, Nyaope | | Widespread use in South Africa. Whoonga is classically reputed to be a combination of heroin with antiretroviral drugs such as ritonavir and/or efavirenz, often combined with additional drugs such as cannabis or hashish, methamphetamine and/or methaqualone |
| Any Benzodiazepine | Psilocybin or psilocybin mushrooms | | | Warp Trip | Warping / Warp Tripping | When taken recreationally, a combination of benzodiazepine and psilocybin may soothe some of the more extreme negative effects often experienced during the peak and comedown phases of a psychedelic trip. Although benzodiazepines do not counteract the hallucinogenic and euphoric sensations caused by Psilocybin (commonly found in psilocybin mushrooms), they are sometimes administered by medical professionals to mitigate symptoms of a "bad trip." This practice helps to gradually relieve overactive sensory responses and induces relaxation in the individual, easing their mental state. |
| Any deliriant or diphenhydramine | MDMA or Psychedelics | | | Nightmare flip | Nightmare flipping | |
| 2C-B or the closely related 2C-x | LSD or any of the Lysergamides | MDMA or any Empathogen-entactogen | | Ali Flip | Ali Flipping | This combination starts as a classic candyflip and ends in a Nexus flip. The LSD is taken first, followed by the MDMA 4 hours later and then 2C-B is taken 2 hours after the MDMA (i.e. 6 hours after the LSD ). MDMA can be replaced by 6-APB, 5-APB, 6-MAPB or 5-MAPB, in this case the Empathogen is taken 2 hours after the LSD, while 2C-B may be replaced by 2C-C, 2C-D or 2C-B-FLY. This combination's goal is to prolong the empathogenic effects of MDMA and the psychedelic effects of LSD. The idea is to be able to experience an enhanced "Candyflipping" with a twist in the end and a smoother comedown. The whole experience is long-lasting and can be too intense for some individuals as all of these molecules synergize and potentiate each other. |
| 2C-B or the closely related 2C-x | Mescaline | MDMA or any Empathogen-entactogen | | | | |
| 2C-B | MDMA | | | Nexus flip | Nexus flipping | The MDMA is often taken first and the 2C-B after the end of the MDMA peak (h+2/h+2.½). The 2C-B is supposed to help the empathogenic effect of the MDMA last longer. |
| 2C-B | DXM | | | Nexuswalk | Nexuswalk | Nexus (slang for 2C-B) + Robowalk (slang for walking on DXM), similar to Nexusflipping |
| 2C-E | LSD | MDMA | | Haychmaich flip | Haychmaich flipping | |
| 2C-P | 2C-E | | | Meskini Trip | Meskini Tripping | |
| 2C-E | MDMA or any Empathogen-entactogen | 2C-B or the closely related 2C-x | | Ilias flip | Ilias flipping | The Ilias Flip inspired by the Ali Flip with the use of 2C-E instead of LSD. Be careful with this combination, as 2C-E can have a heavy body load and is different from other 2C-x drugs. |
| 2C-E | LSD or closely related Lysergamides | MDMA or any Empathogen | 2C-B or closely related 2C-x | Alias Flip | Alias flipping | The Alias flip is a very powerful mix between an Elias flip and an Ali flip. The idea is to take substances in this order to maximize the duration of 2C-E with the LSD taken one hour after 2C-E. |
| 2C-B-Fly | MDMA or any Empathogen-entactogen | 2C-B or the closely related 2C-x | | Ivan flip | Ivan flipping | The Ivan Flip inspired by the Ali Flip with the use of 2C-B-Fly instead of LSD, it can have effects similar to a Selma Flip as 2C-B-Fly is closely related to Mescaline with a shorter duration. Be careful with this combination, as 2C-B-Fly can have a heavy body load and is different from other 2C-x drugs as it is part of the FLY (psychedelics) family. |
| 2C-B | 4-HO-MET | | | Flixxie Flip | Flixxie Flipping | 2C-B taken 40-50 minutes prior to the 4-HO-MET in order to align the peaks. It is extremely visual and moderately low headspace but headspace can increase with increased dosages and can lead to powerful spiritual combinations. Similar to a 2C-T-7 experience. |
| Alcohol | Caffeine | | | Caffeinated alcoholic drink | Irish Coffee | |
| Alcohol | Cannabis | | | Sonechka flip | Sonechka Flipping, Cross faded | Often 40% alcohol and subsequent smoking of cannabis in the process of sexual intercourse at will, but also apply to the consumption of less alcohol-containing drinks |
| Alcohol | Cocaine | | | Snow-cone | Snow-coning | Ethanol is metabolized into cocaethylene |
| Alcohol | MDMA | | | Tipsy flip | Tipsy flipping | It may be dangerous |
| Alcohol | Nicotine | | | Nicotini | | A nicotini is any alcoholic drink which includes nicotine as an ingredient. Nicotine replacement therapy products such as mouth spray may be used. |
| Amphetamine | Barbiturates | | | Inbetweens Bam | | |
| Amphetamine | Cannabis | LSD | | Hippie heart attack | | |
| Amphetamine | Cocaine | | | Snow seals | | |
| Amphetamine | Heroin | | | Bombido | | |
| Amphetamine | Xanax | | | Orange Dream Blossom | Cloud Rush | The combination is crushed together and insufflated |
| Belladonna | Hashish | | | Alamout black hash | | Mixed |
| Caffeine | Cannabis | | | Hippie-speedball | Hippie-speedballing | |
| Caffeine | Diphenhydramine | | | Sleep walk | Sleepwalking | |
| Caffeine | Methamphetamine | | | Ya ba, biker's coffee, kamikaze | | |
| Cacao bean | Magic mushroom | | | | | Aztec use of entheogens. Conventional defatted cocoa dissolved in fat may be used instead of whole beans. |
| CBD | THC | | | | | Low to moderate doses of CBD might reduce some of the paranoia, anxiety, and reduction of hippocampal volumes that the current high potency THC marijuana (in the last decades, THC content increased and CBD content decreased) can cause, if the CBD substitutes a part of the THC dose. Low doses of Kanna might also help counteract the anxiety. |
| Cannabis | Cocoa solids | | | Cannabis-infused brownie | | Cannabis edible |
| Cannabis | Crack cocaine | | | Crack weed (less known: Buddha, caviar, champagne, chronic, cocktail, dirty joint, fry daddy, gimmie, gremmies, juice joint, lace, oolies, p dog, primo, thirty eight, torpedo, turbo, wollie, yeola) | Cocoa puffs, splitting | |
| Cannabis | Crack cocaine | Heroin | | Major Pronin, El Diablo | | |
| Cannabis | Crack cocaine | PCP | | Jim Jones | | |
| Cannabis | Damiana | | | | | Damiana and other herbs can be used as a tobacco alternative for rolling joints. |
| Cannabis | DXM | Nicotine | | Candy blunt | | |
| Cannabis | Heroin or opium | | | A-bomb, Atom bomb, stuff | | |
| Cannabis | MDMA | | | Stoner flip | Stoner flipping | |
| Cannabis | Ketamine | | | Stoner Kitty | | |
| Cannabis | Ketamine | Cocaine | | Simmered | Getting Simmered | |
| Cannabis | Nicotine | | | Blunt, joint, spliff, Jonko | | A rolled cannabis cigarette usually made with rolling paper. A blunt is a cigar hollowed out and filled with cannabis. It is rolled with the tobacco-leaf "wrapper" from an inexpensive cigar. Blunts take their name from Phillies Blunt brand cigars. |
| Cannabis | Opium | | | Demetra | | |
| Cannabis | PCP | | | Wet (less known: Bionic, clickums, donk, illies, leak, love leaf, lovelies, parsley, supergrass, superweed, wet, zoom) | Illing | Wet is cannabis dipped in PCP |
| Cannabis | PCP | Nicotine | | Wet blunt, dust blunt, dusted blunt, Kendrick Lamar blunt | Illing | |
| Cocaine | Heroin | | | Snowball. Other names: Belushi, bombita, murder one, whiz bang | Snowballing | |
| Cocaine | Heroin | LSD | | Frisco special | | |
| Cocaine | Heroin | Nicotine | | Flamethrower, primos | | Cigarette laced with cocaine and heroin |
| Cocaine | Ketamine | | | Cake, CK1, Calvin Klein, Cable, Party bag, Coquette | | |
| Cocaine | Ketamine | MDMA | | Ketamollicaine | | |
| Cocaine | LSD | MDMA | | Candy-flip on a string | Candy-flipping on a string | High risk on health |
| Cocaine | MDMA | | | Sugar flip | Sugar flipping | |
| Cocaine | Morphine | | | C & M | | |
| Cocaine | PCP | | | Space, whack | | |
| Cocaine | Wine | | | Coca wine | | Ethanol is metabolized into cocaethylene |
| Cocaine | Quetiapine | | | Q-ball | | |
| Codeine | Glutethimide | | | Pancakes and syrups | | Combination of glutethimide and codeine cough syrup |
| Codeine | Promethazine | | | Lean, purple drank, oil | | |
| Diphenhydramine | DXM | | | OTC flip, counterflipping | OTC flipping, robowalking on a string | |
| DMT | LSD | | | Cosmo flip, Meadow flip | Cosmo flipping, meadow flipping | |
| DMT | LSD | Psilocybin or psilocybin mushroom | | Super flip | Super flipping | |
| DMT | MAOIs | | | Pharmahuasca | | |
| DMT | Psilocybin or psilocybin mushroom | | | Terence flip | Terence flipping | |
| DMT | Nitrous oxide | | | Dimension flip | Dimension flipping | Nitrous oxide can, allegedly, briefly multiply the effects of psychedelics like DMT or NB-DMT |
| DMT | Alcohol | | | Spyder, Spyder spin | Spyder spinning | |
| DXM | LSD | | | LSDXM | | |
| DXM | MDMA | | | Robo flip | Robo flipping | |
| DXM | Psilocybin or psilocybin mushroom | | | Cherry-bomb | Cherry-bombing | |
| Fentanyl | Heroin | | | Birria, chiva loca, Facebook | | |
| Fentanyl (and/or heroin) | Xylazine | | | Tranq, Tranq dope | | |
| Fentanyl | LSD | | | Space Fent | Blackholing | |
| GHB | MDMA | | | Gamma flip | Gamma flipping | |
| GHB | Methamphetamine | | | Cherry meth | | |
| Hashish | Crack cocaine | | | Double zero | | |
| Hashish | LSD | | | Royal temple ball | | |
| Hashish | Opium | | | Black hash, black Russian | | |
| Heroin | Methamphetamine | | | Goofball | | |
| Heroin | Morphine | | | New Jack swing | | |
| Heroin | PCP | | | Alien sex fiend | | |
| Ketamine | LSD | | | Dolphin flip | Dolphin flipping | |
| Ketamine | MDMA | | | Kitty flip, MK-ultra | Kitty flipping | |
| Ketamine | Psilocybin or Psilocybin mushrooms | | | Funky flip, chonk | Funky flipping, chonking | |
| LSD | Caffeine | | | Hoffmann Flip | Hoffmann flipping | |
| LSD | Ketamine | MDMA | | Holy Trident, Martin Luther King flip, Galaxy flip | Holy Tridenting, Martin Luther King flipping, Galaxy Flipping | |
| LSD | MDMA | | | Candy flip | Candy flipping | Generally, the MDMA is taken approximately 4 hours after the LSD ingestion. A variant of this combination consists of adding 2C-B on top of it before the Candy Flip starts coming down and it transforms it into a longer experience known as an Ali Flip. |
| LSD | MDMA | Psilocybin or psilocybin mushroom | | Jedi flip, twilight flip | Jedi flipping, twilight flipping | |
| LSD | MDMA | Mushrooms | Ketamine | Quantum Flip | Quantum Flipping | |
| LSD | Nitrous oxide | | | Gasid | | Nitrous oxide can, allegedly, briefly multiply the effects of psychedelics like LSD. |
| LSD | PCP | | | Black acid | | |
| LSD | MDMA | Ketamine | | Swalap Flip | Swalaped | |
| LSD | Psilocybin or psilocybin mushroom | | | God's flesh, Soul Bomb, Alice, Wizard flip | Wizard flipping | |
| LSD | Dissociatives, especially long-lasting ones such as DMXE and/or DCK. | MDMA | | Pixie flip | Pixie flipping | |
| LSD | Dissociatives, especially long-lasting ones such as DMXE and/or DCK. | MDMA | DMT | Behind the curtain, portal flip | Climbing behind the curtain, portal flipping | |
| LSD | Metocin (4-HO-MET) | | | Neon Bomb, Diamond Bomb | Neon Bombing, Diamond Bombing | |
| MDMA | Mescaline or psychoactive cactus | | | Love flip, love trip | Love flipping | |
| MDMA | Methamphetamine | | | Trailer flip | Trailer flipping | |
| MDMA | DMT | | | Shaman flip, time flip | Shaman flipping, time flipping | |
| MDMA | Nitrous oxide | | | Nox | | |
| MDMA | Opiates | | | Poppy flip | Poppy flipping | |
| MDMA | PCP | | | Domex, elephant flip | Elephant flipping | |
| MDMA | Psilocybin or psilocybin mushroom | | | Hippie flip | Hippie flipping | |
| MDMA or any Empathogen-entactogen | 5-MeO-MiPT | 2C-B or the closely related 2C-x | | | | |
| MDMA | Viagra (or other PDE5 inhibitors such as Cialis or Levitra) | | | Sextasy, trail mix, cocktail pills | | |
| MDMA | Xanax | | | Zen flip | Zen flipping | |
| Methamphetamine | Secobarbital, or other barbiturates | | | Poor man's speedball | | |
| Methamphetamine | Alpha-PVP | | | Cartel meth | | |
| Methaqualone | Cannabis | | | White pipe | | Ingested by smoking. Popular in South Africa, elsewhere in Africa, and in India. |
| Pentazocine | Tripelannamine | | | T's and Blues | | |
| Venlafaxine | Mirtazepine | | | California rocket fuel | | |

== See also ==
- ACE mixture
- Brompton cocktail
- D-IX
- Desbutal
- Dexamyl
- Gray death
- Homebake (slang)
- Neuroleptanalgesic
- Rodent cocktail
- Tuinal
- Twilight sleep
- List of plants used for smoking
