= Eskatrol =

Amphetamine weight loss agent

Eskatrol was the brand name of a combination prescription drug manufactured by Smith, Kline & French Laboratories and marketed in the United States as an appetite suppressant and weight loss agent ("diet pill").. The product's active ingredients comprised the central nervous system (CNS) stimulant, dextroamphetamine sulfate and the typical antipsychotic, prochlorperazine–the former of which was also manufactured by Smith, Kline, & French and marketed on its own as Dexedrine. Eskatrol was among the 200 most commonly-prescribed medications in the U.S. in the early 1980s, when in 1981, the U.S. Food and Drug Administration (FDA) mandated the product cease production and be withdrawn from the market, on the assertion that SF&K had to failed to prove the medication's therapeutic efficacy (E_{max}).

== Contextual background ==
Beginning with the Kefauver–Harris Amendment in 1962, public policy discourse pertaining to combatting substance abuse by criminalizing drug use and strengthening legal penalties for drug use prohibiting substances like cannabis, LSD, and heroin was increasing, resulting in passage of Controlled Substances Act in late 1970, followed by the creation of the Drug Enforcement Administration in 1973.

=== Withdrawal of Combination Anorectics from the US market ===
In August 1970, the US FDA announced a plan to combat stimulant abuse by limiting the number of treatment claims permitted on stimulant prescribing information to three specific indications: the treatment of narcolepsy, treatment of hyperactivity, and treatment of obesity; in the case of treating obesity, in addition to intensifying warnings of potential drug hazards and side effects. Regarding the use of amphetamines as anorectic agents, the FDA further restricted use of such drugs for weight loss to short-term use, generally six to twelve weeks.

As a result of this context, the combination drugs Obetrol, Desbutal, Acutran and were all withdrawn from the market concurrently in 1973, followed by Eskatrol in 1981, and Dexamyl in 1982.

=== Pop culture ===
Jimmy Buffett references the drug in his 1980 song "Fool Button," with the lyric "If you don't believe my words/ Or think my story′s true/ Get a bottle of rum and a Eskatrol/ And watch the same thing happen to you."

== See also ==
- Desbutal
- Dexamyl
- D-IX
- Obetrol
- Obocell
- Jeffrey R. MacDonald, a former American medical doctor and United States Army Captain convicted of murder and alleged to have regularly taken Eskatrol
