= Amfecloral =

Withdrawn appetite suppressant drug

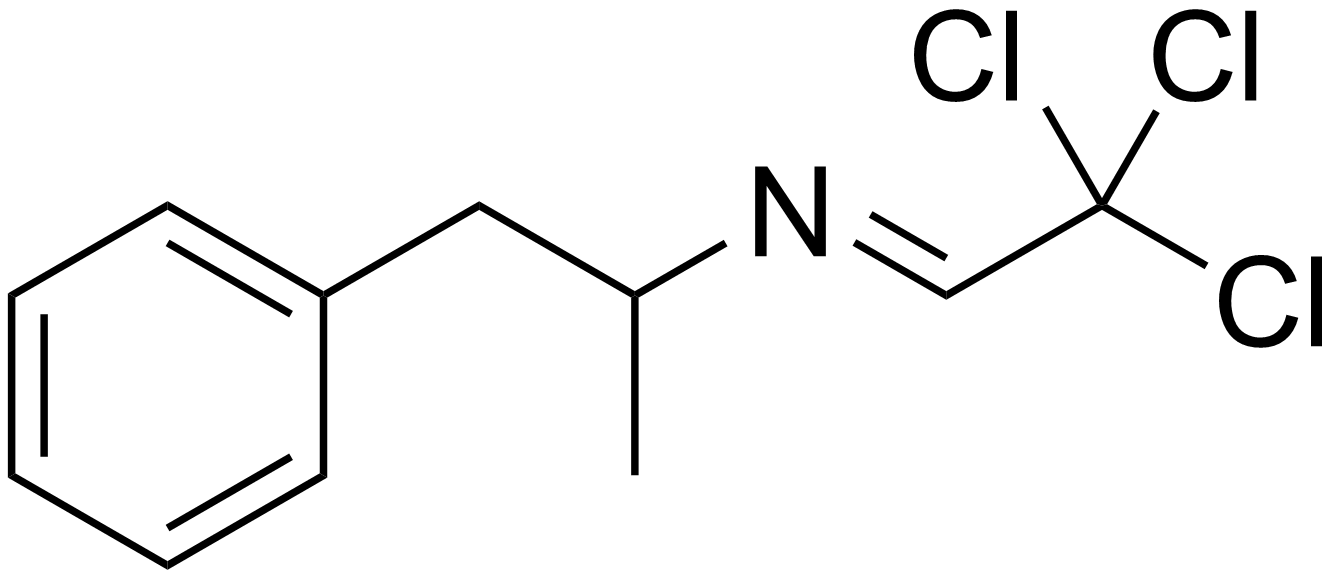

Clinical data
- Trade names: Acutran
- Other names: alpha-methyl-N-(2,2,2-trichloroethylidene)phenethylamine; N-(2,2,2-trichloroethylidene)amphetamine
- Drug class: Stimulant; Anoretic
- ATC code: none

Legal status
- Legal status: ?

Identifiers
- IUPAC name: 2,2,2-trichloro-N-(1-phenylpropan-2-yl)ethanimine
- CAS Number: 5581-35-1
- PubChem CID: 21759
- DrugBank: DB08924
- ChemSpider: 20451
- UNII: 6015XOA0BI
- KEGG: D02926
- ChEMBL: ChEMBL2105544
- CompTox Dashboard (EPA): DTXSID00863571

Chemical and physical data
- Formula: C_{11}H_{12}Cl_{3}N
- Molar mass: 264.57 g·mol^{−1}
- 3D model (JSmol): Interactive image
- SMILES: ClC(Cl)(Cl)/C=N/C(Cc1ccccc1)C
- InChI: InChI=1S/C11H12Cl3N/c1-9(15-8-11(12,13)14)7-10-5-3-2-4-6-10/h2-6,8-9H,7H2,1H3/b15-8+; Key:VBZDETYCYXPOAK-OVCLIPMQSA-N

Amfecloral (INN) or amphecloral (USAN) is a combination drug containing a central nervous system (CNS) stimulant and anorectic drug, dextroamphetamine, as well as a CNS depressant and sedative-hypnotic, chloral hydrate.

Widely used for its anorectic properties, amfecloral was approved by the United States Food and Drug Administration as an anti-obesity drug and marketed and distributed under the brand name Acutran. Upon 1962 passage of the Kefauver-Harris Amendment, pressure grew to withdraw the product from the market, and in 1973, production ceased for Acutran and its generic formulation, concurrent with similar combination anorectics, Desbutal (methamphetamine-pentobarbital) and Obetrol (methamphetamine-dextroamphetamine).

== Naming and Classification ==
The British Pharmacopoeia Commission approved the name amfecloral in 1970. It is classified as a combination drug constituting active ingredients belong to the phenethylamine and ethanol chemical classes, similar to many combination drugs in widespread use at the time for various indications, including Desbutal, Dexamyl (also branded AmoDex), and Obetrol. Amfecloral belongs to the phenethylamine and substituted amphetamine chemical classes.

== Synthesis and Pharmacology ==
The raw ingredients used in manufacturing it were dextroamphetamine and chloral hydrate.

Upon ingestion and metabolization, amfecloral is metabolized as dextroamphetamine and chloral hydrate, as well as converting into levoamphetamine, the R enantiomer of amphetamine. Amphetamine is a stimulant, whereas chloral hydrate is a sedative/hypnotic drug.

The extent of metabolism and in-vivo contribution of a chloral hydrate metabolism to its purported "little to no stimulant activity" is unknown.

== History ==
=== Combination Drugs in the Twentieth Century ===
Acutran was one of several brands, amfecloral one of several formulations distributed as anorectic combination drugs comprising a CNS stimulant and a CNS depressant–respectively known as "uppers" and "downers" in common parlance, conjoined in the form of one pill: others included Desbutal (methamphetamine-pentobarbital) and Obetrol (meth-dexamphetamine), both of which were discontinued concurrent to Acutran in 1973; Eskatrol (amphetamine and the neuroleptic compazine, discontinued 1981), in addition to Dexamyl (dextamphetamine-amylbarbitone).

=== Efficacy and Tolerability ===
A review from 1970 specified that amfecloral was unique among amphetamine-like substances in that it displayed little to no stimulant activity, likely due to the powerful sedating effects of chloral hydrate, the same claims were not made of the other combination medications.

The extent of metabolism and in-vivo contribution of a chloral hydrate metabolism to its purported "little to no stimulant activity" is unknown.

=== Discontinuation ===
Following increased scrutiny of combination medications comprising psychostimulant and sedative components with the 1962 passage of the Kefauver-Harris Amendment, then the Controlled Substances Act of 1970, Acutran was withdrawn from the U.S. pharmaceutical market and ceased production, alongside Desbutal (methamphetamine-pentobarbital) and Obetrol (methamphetamine-dextroamphetamine), all three of which were fully discontinued by the end of 1973.

== See also ==
- Amfetaminil
- Clobenzorex
- Desbutal (also discontinued 1973)
- Dexamyl
- Eskatrol
- Obetrol (also discontinued 1973)
