= Tafrodol =

Discontinued medication

Tapentadol/carisoprodol

Combination of
- Tapentadol: Opioid
- Carisoprodol: Muscle relaxant

Clinical data
- Trade names: Tafrodol
- Routes of administration: By mouth

Tafrodol was the brand name of a combination drug composed of the opioid analgesic drug tapentadol and the muscle relaxant and sedative drug carisoprodol within the same pill. It was manufactured by an Indian pharmaceutical company Aveo Pharmaceuticals and marketed primarily to consumers in West African countries such as Ghana, Nigeria and Cote d'Ivoire, from around 2018-2025 before being withdrawn from the market following safety concerns and issues with abuse. In contrast to comparable combination drugs such as dexamyl and desbutal which were marketed for legitimate medical applications but later withdrawn, tafrodol was never approved as an analgesic and appears to have been marketed primarily for recreational use, but under the guise of a legitimate pharmaceutical product taking advantage of weak regulatory laws in the destination markets. This ultimately led to both the banning of the product in both India and various West African nations, as well as Aveo Pharmaceuticals losing its license to manufacture pharmaceuticals within India.

== See also ==
- Borax combo, a combination of MDAI or 5-MAPB, 2-fluoromethamphetamine, and 5-MeO-MiPT or 4-HO-MET, sold as an alternative to MDMA.
- D-IX, an experimental drug containing methamphetamine, cocaine & oxycodone.
- Fen-phen, a combination weight loss drug containing fenfluramine and phentermine, withdrawn because of heart attacks.
- Kush (drug), a combination drug product containing a mixture of synthetic opioids and synthetic cannabinoids subject to widespread abuse in West Africa.
- T's & blues, a combination of the opioid drug pentazocine and the sedating antihistamine tripelennamine.
- Tuinal, another withdrawn drug product containing a combination of barbiturate sedatives.
