= Desbutal =

Discontinued medication

Methamphetamine/pentobarbital

Combination of
- Methamphetamine: Stimulant
- Pentobarbital: Barbiturate

Clinical data
- Trade names: Desbutal
- Routes of administration: By mouth

Identifiers
- CAS Number: 8028-71-5
- PubChem CID: 154472
- ChemSpider: 136094
- CompTox Dashboard (EPA): DTXSID801001142

Chemical and physical data
- 3D model (JSmol): Interactive image
- SMILES: CCCC(C)C1(C(=O)NC(=O)NC1=O)CC.CC(CC1=CC=CC=C1)NC.Cl
- InChI: InChI=1S/C11H18N2O3.C10H15N.ClH/c1-4-6-7(3)11(5-2)8(14)12-10(16)13-9(11)15;1-9(11-2)8-10-6-4-3-5-7-10;/h7H,4-6H2,1-3H3,(H2,12,13,14,15,16);3-7,9,11H,8H2,1-2H3;1H; Key:OVVVDQPFLUEXOY-UHFFFAOYSA-N

Desbutal was the brand name of a fixed-dose combination formulation composed of 5mg of the central nervous system (CNS) stimulant ("upper") amphetamine derivative, methamphetamine hydrochloride (HCl) and 30 mg of the CNS depressant ("downer") barbiturate, pentobarbital sodium. Manufactured by Abbott Laboratories as a scored tablet to be taken orally.

Marketed as an antidepressant, as well an anorectic for treating obesity, a treatment for narcolepsy, parkinsonism, alcoholism, and some off-label uses, Desbutal had a high potential for abuse and dependence, consequently being discontinued.

== Dosage forms ==
Desbutal was designed as round biphasic tablets, with the two active ingredients visibly partitioned between the two faces of the tablet to control their rates of dissolution and achieve a more preferable pharmacokinetic profile. Each tablet featured a yellow half which contained an immediate-release formulation of pentobarbital sodium, and a blue half which contained a sustained-release formulation of methamphetamine hydrochloride (Desoxyn Gradumet). The three dosages of tablets that were manufactured included 5 mg, 10 mg, and 15 mg of methamphetamine hydrochloride with 30 mg, 60 mg, and 90 mg of pentobarbital sodium, respectively. Abuse of Desbutal often involved physical separation of these two halves by sawing with a razor or fingernails, followed by the consumption of each active ingredient independently rather than concurrently. Typically abusers would ingest the blue half containing methamphetamine for stimulation and wakefulness, followed by future ingestion of the yellow half containing pentobarbital as a hypnotic for counteracting stimulant-induced insomnia whenever sleep was desired.

== Overdose ==
Desbutal overdose was typically life-threatening as a result of acute toxicity from pentobarbital poisoning, since the oral median lethal dose (LD_{50}) of pentobarbital sodium is reached significantly sooner than the oral LD_{50} of methamphetamine hydrochloride when consumed as dosage units with the mass ratio present in Desbutal. Barbiturate overdose is a medical emergency which was treated with immediate gastric lavage, mechanical ventilation, and intermittent intravenous bolus administration of multiple different drugs, since no selective barbiturate binding site receptor antagonists were clinically available as an antidote, and dosages were dependent on individual patient response. These drugs often included picrotoxin, amiphenazole (Daptazile), bemegride (Megimide), and methamphetamine sulfate (Methedrine) in dosages sometimes exceeding 250 mg over the first 24-hour period of being admitted into an intensive care unit (ICU). While a quantitative relationship between the blood levels of barbiturate derivatives and the depression of the central nervous system (CNS) had become established by researchers in 1955, they also emphasized that the accurate correlation of these factors is complicated by the presence of tolerance to the drug, intercurrent disease and senility, as well as the concurrent administration of other noxious substances.

== Regulations ==
Marketing approval of Desbutal was withdrawn by the United States Food and Drug Administration (FDA) in 1973 as part of a mass drug recall of all anorectic combination drugs containing a CNS stimulant paired with a CNS depressant. The recall also included all existing stocks of parenteral amphetamines based on the FDA's contention that these products have such a great drug abuse potential that they cannot be used safely.

Despite the Bureau of Narcotics and Dangerous Drugs having already reduced the amphetamine aggregate production quota for pharmaceutical manufacturers by approximately 90% in the previous two years, these combination drugs had rapidly grown in popularity throughout the prior two decades. Many pharmaceutical manufacturers were vigorously competing for market share by continuously developing new combinations and dosage formulations, and at the time of the 1973 recall, the estimated annual distribution of these pills was equivalent to 480 million dosage units of Obetrol 10 mg tablets.

=== Medical use of discontinued combination drugs ===
Discontinued psychiatric combination drugs were often justified for medical use through the lens of a multifaceted, comprehensive approach to health care treatment. CNS stimulants (colloquially called "uppers") were used variously for their appetite-suppressing, antidepressant, and wakefulness-promoting properties, in addition to providing alertness, energy and motivation, as well as sustained focus, while a CNS depressant (typically a barbiturate or similar sedative-hypnotic agent) would mitigate the stimulant's adverse effects without eliminating therapeutic benefits. These medications could also replace monoamine oxidase inhibitors in the treatment of patients with certain forms of refractory depression where MAOIs are indicated, but the patient would be unlikely to restrict tyramine from the diet.

Typically, the CNS stimulant within these older, now-defunct combination drugs was racemic amphetamine, dextroamphetamine, or methamphetamine as various single or mixed salts, although substituted amphetamine anorectic stimulants ("diet pills") like phenmetrazine, phendimetrazine, and phentermine were occasionally used marketed.

Likewise, the CNS depressant within the historical combination drugs was typically a single barbiturate salt, often pentobarbital sodium or amobarbital, but non-barbiturate tranquilizers such as meprobamate (Miltown) and sedatives like methaqualone hydrochloride would occasionally replace the barbiturate.

Less common formulations of combination drugs included a CNS stimulant paired with [multiple] vitamins and minerals; a stimulant with a typical antipsychotic (Eskatrol is a primary example); or a stimulant and a first generation antihistamine. There also existed formulations utilizing amphetamines paired with phenacetin and aspirin for the purpose of pain relief, in addition to either a barbiturate or meprobamate.

== See also ==
- Amfecloral, a single molecule with a similar effect (due to metabolites).
- Dexamyl, another pharmaceutical containing an amphetamine and a barbiturate.
- D-IX, an experimental drug containing methamphetamine, cocaine & oxycodone.
- Speedball, which is the same concept but using opioids instead of a barbiturate.
- Tuinal, an insomnia medication containing two different barbiturates.
- Tafrodol, a drug combination containing tapentandol and carisoprodol.
