= Speedball (drug) =

Combination of narcotics

Speedball

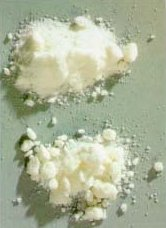
Cocaine powder

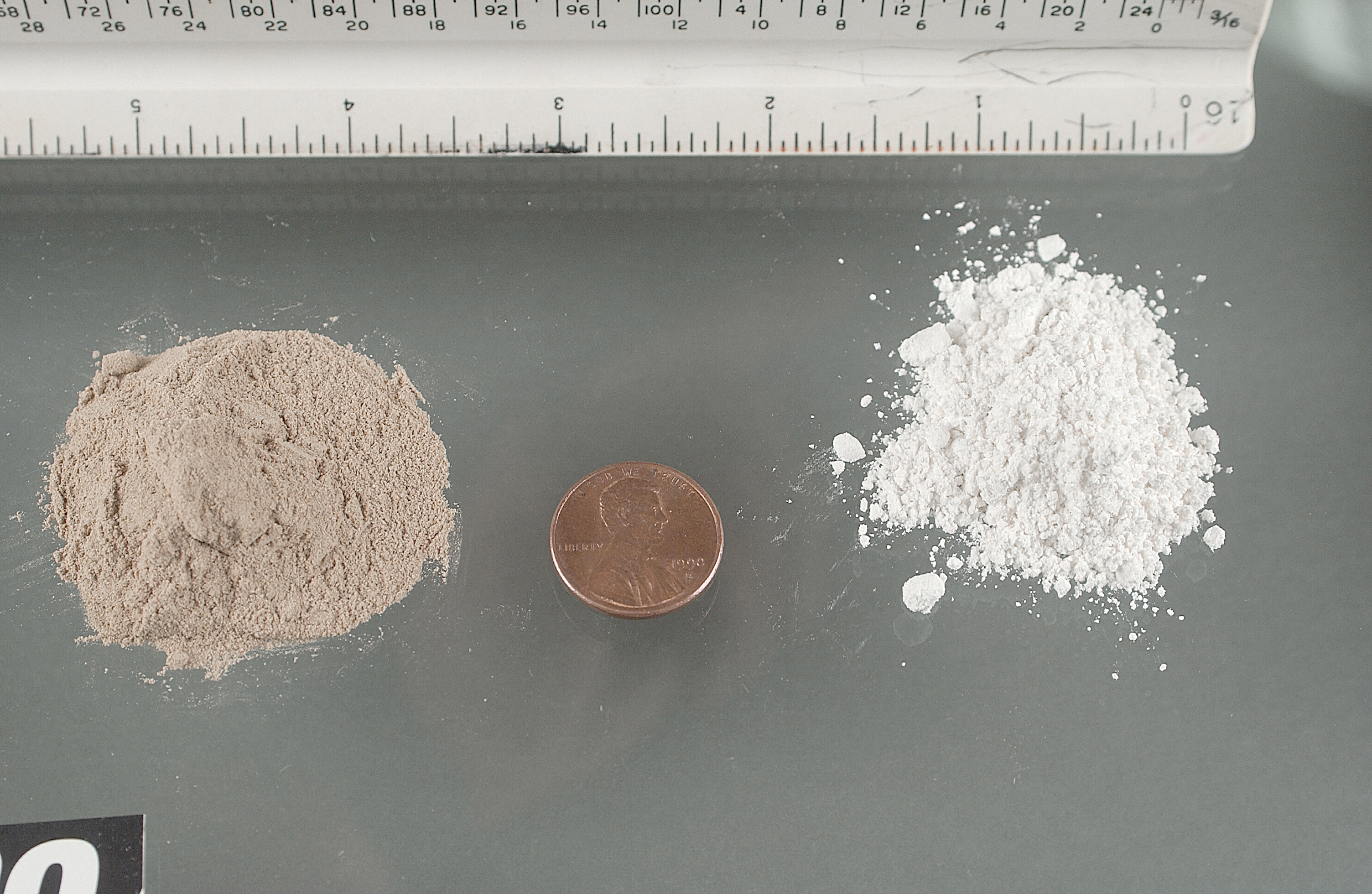
Heroin powder

Speedball, powerball, or over and under is the polydrug mixture of a stimulant with a depressant. The most well-known mixture used for recreational drug use is that of cocaine and heroin; however, methamphetamine mixed with morphine or fentanyl has also been used. A speedball may be taken intravenously or by nasal insufflation.

Speedballs often give stronger effects than either drug when taken alone due to drug synergy, but are a particularly hazardous mixture that can easily cause heart attack, respiratory arrest and death. When compared to single drugs, speedballs are more likely to lead to addiction, relapse and overdose.

== History ==
The classic speedball is heroin and cocaine. It could also mean morphine and an amphetamine.

The United States Drug Enforcement Administration warned in 2019 that the rapid rise of fentanyl supply in the country has led to combinations of both fentanyl and heroin with cocaine ("super speedballs"). In addition, the cross-contamination of powdered fentanyl into cocaine supplies has led to reports of cocaine users unknowingly consuming a speedball-like combination.

Pink cocaine or "tusi" usually includes an unknown mix of uppers and downers and is sometimes called a speedball. Cocaine mixed with ketamine is called a CK or Calvin Klein.

Reportedly speedballs now account for most of the overdose fatalities in San Francisco. Many people are not speedballing intentionally. Rather, it has become difficult to avoid because so much of the cocaine, crack and methamphetamine supply is adulterated with fentanyl. As of 2023 it is being called the "fourth wave" of the opioid epidemic.

== Physiological response ==
It is a widespread misconception that taking downers will reduce the risk of adverse cardiac effects from stimulants, or vice versa. Stimulants and opioids are more dangerous when mixed because they work in different ways. Some stimulants, such as cocaine, wear off before most opiates. When heart rate changes quickly, first increasing rapidly from the effect of the stimulant and then dropping quickly when the stimulant wears off and the full effects of the opiates are felt, this can cause a stroke or heart failure.

Speedballs are extremely dangerous. The variations in heart rate and contraction caused by taking the mix of uppers/downers can lead to stroke or death even in young, healthy persons.

== Notable deaths attributed to speedball use ==
- Jean-Michel Basquiat (artist, died 1988), though other sources list his death as heroin overdose only.
- John Belushi (comic actor, died 1982)
- Ken Caminiti (baseball player, died 2004)
- Brandon Clarke (basketball player, died 2026)
- Chris Farley (comic actor, died 1997)
- Pete Farndon (rock musician, died 1983)
- Zac Foley (alternative rock musician of the band EMF, died 2002)
- Trevor Goddard (actor, died 2003)
- Mitch Hedberg (comedian, died 2005)
- Philip Seymour Hoffman (actor, died 2014)
- Sebastian Horsley (artist and writer, died 2010)
- Chris Kelly (rapper of the duo Kris Kross, died 2013)
- Brent Mydland (musician, died 1990)
- River Phoenix (actor, died 1993)
- DJ Rashad (musician, died 2014)
- Judee Sill (singer-songwriter, died 1979)
- Layne Staley (singer-songwriter, died 2002)
- Joey Stefano (actor, died 1994)
- Michael K. Williams (actor, died 2021)

=== Notable non-fatal incidents ===
- In 1996, the rock musician Steven Adler had a stroke after taking a speedball, leaving him with a permanent speech impediment.
- Also in 1996, pop-music singer Dave Gahan suffered a heart attack following a speedball overdose, but survived.
- According to his autobiography, guitarist Slash experienced cardiac arrest for eight minutes in 1992 after mixing heroin and crack cocaine, but was revived.

== See also ==
- Amfecloral
- Brompton cocktail
- Combined drug intoxication
- Desbutal
- Dexamyl
- Drug abuse
- List of deaths from drug overdose and intoxication
- List of polysubstance combinations
- Poly drug use
