= Tusi (drug) =

Mixture of different psychoactive drugs

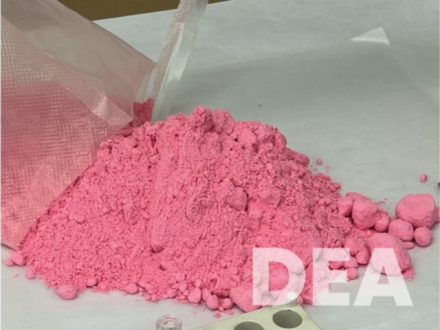
- Tusi, also known as "pink cocaine." Its pink color comes from food coloring.

Combination of
- Ketamine: Dissociative
- MDMA: Empathogen
- Methamphetamine: Stimulant
- Cocaine: Stimulant
- Eutylone: Stimulant
- Oxycodone: Opioid

Clinical data
- Other names: pink cocaine, tuci, tucci, tussi
- Routes of administration: By mouth (oral), inhalation, insufflation
- ATC code: None

Legal status
- Legal status: In general: illegal

Pharmacokinetic data
- Bioavailability: depends on combination
- Metabolism: depends on combination
- Metabolites: depends on combination
- Onset of action: • Oral: <30 minutes; • Intranasal: <1 minute
- Elimination half-life: depends on combination
- Duration of action: depends on combination

Tusi (also written as tussi, tuci, or tucibi) is a recreational drug that contains a mixture of different psychoactive substances, most commonly found in a pink-dyed powder known as pink cocaine. It is believed to have originated in Latin America, specifically Colombia around 2018. Ketamine and MDMA are the most common ingredients, although cocaine, methamphetamine, oxycodone, caffeine and various cathinones are found as well. There are no standard proportions of the constituent drugs.

The inclusion of pink dye is an element that seeks to attract consumers, especially young people, by offering a striking visual aspect that resembles something "attractive" or "festive."

Though the name "tusi" is phonetically related to "2C", tusi is not the same psychoactive substance as 2C-B or more broadly, the 2C family. Tusi, according to the UN Office on Drugs and Crime, contained no 2C-B in most instances as of 2022.

== Society and culture ==
=== Latin America ===
Tusi was introduced to Colombia by upper-class young people from Medellín who brought it from Europe. Its name is derived from 2C-B's English pronunciation "two cee bee". In its early days, it was an elite drug, much more expensive than cocaine. To facilitate its consumption, it began to be mixed with pink food coloring, which gave it its characteristic aesthetic. Due to the limited availability of 2C-B, traffickers began adulterating it with caffeine, MDMA, and ketamine. This mixture became the standard formula, which rarely contained 2C-B from that point on. Production expanded to several Colombian cities.

Beginning in 2015, tusi began to be exported to countries such as the United States, Panama, Ecuador, Peru, and Chile. Starting in 2017, tusi became democratized and its price dropped significantly, attracting middle- and lower-class consumers.

By mid-2022, this drug had already become popular in several Latin American countries, including Chile, Argentina, Uruguay, Panama, Mexico, Costa Rica, Venezuela, Peru, Bolivia, and Paraguay.

=== Europe ===
The popularity of tusi in Spain began during the nighttime parties that resumed after the restrictions of the COVID-19 pandemic in Spain. This context created an environment conducive to recreational drug use, in which tusi became an attractive option due to its appearance and perceived effects. Recreational use of tusi expanded enormously in tourist areas such as Valencia, Marbella or Ibiza. In some areas, it acquired the name "chic drug".

=== United States ===
Authorities in New York City report that lab-tested samples have very little or no cocaine. They say there are record numbers of overdoses and there is no way to know exactly what is in pink cocaine. Because tusi usually contains a mix of uppers and downers, it is sometimes called a speedball.

Authorities are trying to educate potential users who may not know how different ketamine is from cocaine. Cocaine is a stimulant and ketamine is a sedative-hallucinogenic anesthetic. It does not mix well with alcohol.

== Effects ==
=== Common effects ===
The effects of tusi are varied and depend on the specific mix of substances in each dose. Similar to ecstasy, tusi can cause an intense feeling of happiness and an increase in energy, making it popular at electronic music parties. In addition, it can induce sudden changes in mood, ranging from euphoria to paranoia.

Various sources claim that the duration of its effects vary from 30 minutes to a maximum of 8 hours.

==== Risks ====
With repeated use, users can develop tolerance, leading to an increase in the dose consumed and an increased risk of severe adverse effects. Potentially fatal adverse effects of tusi include seizures, cardiac arrhythmias, increased blood pressure, and heart attack.

This drug has been known to cause substance-induced psychosis.

== Pharmacology ==
Drugs detected within the 19 samples of pink powder tusi/2C-B submissions to Erowid's DrugsData between 2019 and 2022:

Drugs detected within the tusi samples (2019–2022)
Substance	Drug class	Percentage of samples
Ketamine	Dissociative anaesthetic	94.7%
Ketamine precursor	Dissociative anaesthetic (precursor)	84.2%
MDMA	Empathogen/Entactogen, Stimulant	63.2%
Caffeine	Stimulant	52.6%
Methamphetamine	Stimulant	15.8%
Cocaine	Stimulant	10.5%
MDA	Empathogen/Entactogen, Stimulant	10.5%
Oxycodone	Opioid	10.5%
Eutylone (bk-EBDB)	Empathogen/Entactogen, Cathinone	10.5%
Levamisole	Antihelminthic (often used as an adulterant)	10.5%
DMT	Psychedelic	5.3%
Lidocaine	Local anaesthetic (often used as an adulterant)	5.3%
Tramadol	Opioid	5.3%

== See also ==
- Polysubstance use
- Polysubstance dependence
- Speedball
