= Dexamyl =

Discontinued medication

Amobarbital/dextroamphetamine

Combination of
- Amobarbital: Barbiturate
- Dextroamphetamine: Stimulant

Clinical data
- Trade names: Dexamyl, Drinamyl
- Other names: Amylbarbitone/dextroamphetamine
- Routes of administration: By mouth

Dexamyl (or Drinamyl in the UK) was the brand name of a combination drug composed of amobarbital (previously called amylbarbitone) and dextroamphetamine (Dexedrine) within the same pill. It was widely abused and is no longer manufactured.

First introduced in 1950 by Smith, Kline & French (SKF), Dexamyl was marketed as an anorectic obesity medication as well as an anxiolytic and antidepressant medication that did not cause agitation. Racemic amphetamine had already been marketed over-the-counter (OTC) since 1933 as a nasal decongestant inhaler device sold under the brand name Benzedrine, and also as an oral tablet since 1938. Dexamyl utilized its enantiopure isomer of greater central nervous system (CNS) selectivity, dextroamphetamine, to elevate mood and suppress appetite, whereas the concomitant barbiturate was included to broadly counteract potential adverse effects from dextroamphetamine. Its name is a portmanteau of dextro- amphetamine and amyl- barbitone.

Dexamyl was discontinued in 1982 in favor of monoamine oxidase inhibitors (MAOIs) and tricyclic antidepressants (TCAs) which were recently developed and shared treatment indications with Dexamyl yet lacked the high dependence potential and abuse liability which characterized long-term Dexamyl usage.

== History ==
British prime minister Anthony Eden was prescribed Dexamyl; he was using it to treat abdominal pain. It has been suggested that the drug impaired his judgment during the Suez Crisis. The failure of his Suez policies led to his ousting while he was recovering in Jamaica.

In Britain during the early 1960s, the drug was taken by "tired housewives"; it was also abused by youths who took excessively large doses and nicknamed the triangular blue tablets "purple hearts" or "blues." This became a celebrated part of the Mod subculture. Dexamyl is the recreational drug of choice for the main character of the film Quadrophenia, who eventually suffers from amphetamine psychosis.

Henry Grahn, a general practitioner from Philadelphia who also conducted a study on the usage and effects of Dexamyl among his patients, would pronounce the effectiveness of the drug with the quote “This is a Dexamyl age, an age of unrest; probably no other period in history has been dominated by a mood of uncertainty and disquiet.”

A famous patient of Sigmund Freud, Sergei Pankejeff (also known as the Wolf Man), was supplied with these by Muriel Gardiner from the United States which he, himself, felt was the only method for treating his depressive episodes.

In the late 1960s and early 1970s, Dexamyl spansules—a clear and green capsule containing green and white "beads"—became popular as a street-drug named "Christmas trees".

In his autobiography My Life of Absurdity, author Chester Himes writes of his use of Dexamyl in the mid-1950s. He also writes that he stopped taking the drug after his friend Vandi Haygood died from "steady doses of Dexamyl".

George C. Nichopoulos was indicted in May 1980 for having improperly prescribed Dexamyl and phenmetrazine (Preludin) to the singer Jerry Lee Lewis, despite knowing he was addicted to them.

Patrick A. Mazza, team physician for the Reading Phillies, said he prescribed Dexamyl, Eskatrol, Dexedrine, and Preludin for Steve Carlton, Larry Christenson, Tim McCarver, Pete Rose, Larry Bowa, and Greg Luzinski. The charges against Mazza were dropped after he contended that he had provided the prescriptions in good faith to the baseball players at their request. The pill was writer Terry Southern's drug of choice for many years.

== See also ==
- Amfecloral, a single molecule with a similar effect (due to metabolites).
- Desbutal, another pharmaceutical containing an amphetamine and a barbiturate.
- D-IX, an experimental drug containing methamphetamine, cocaine & oxycodone.
- The song "Big Black Smoke" by the Kinks makes reference to the drug with the lyric "And every penny she had was spent on purple hearts and cigarettes."
- Speedballing
- Tafrodol, a drug combination containing tapentandol and carisoprodol.
