= Herbert Snow =

English surgeon and medical writer

Herbert Lumley Snow
- Born: 1847
- Died: 20 November 1930; St Leonards-on-Sea
- Occupations: Surgeon, medical writer

Herbert Lumley Snow (1847 – 20 November 1930) was an English surgeon, anti-vivisectionist, cancer researcher and medical writer.

== Biography ==
Snow graduated from University of London in 1869 with First Class Honours in Medicine, Forensic Medicine, and Midwifery. He obtained his M.D. and membership of the Royal College of Surgeons of England in 1871. He was a surgeon at South Staffordshire General Hospital and Birmingham General Dispensary.

He was appointed to the Cancer Hospital in Brompton, London in 1876. This was the first hospital in the world specifically founded to treat cancer patients. It was renamed the Royal Marsden Hospital in 1910. Snow worked at the Cancer Hospital as a staff surgeon until 1905. He was a cancer researcher who lectured and wrote extensively on the topic.

Snow is known for his research on melanoma. In 1892, he proposed melanoma to be treated by excision and anticipatory gland excision which was controversial because this was before the acceptance of elective lymph node dissections. In 1893, Snow conducted the first epidemiological study linking cancer and depression. He studied 250 women with uterine and breast cancer. He found that "of 250 women suffering from cancer of the mammae and uterus... 171 had expressed history of an immediate antecedent of trouble often in very poignant form, as the loss of a near relative." In 1896, Snow developed the Brompton cocktail made from a combination of morphine and cocaine to relieve pain in cancer patients.

He died on 20 November 1930 in St Leonards-on-Sea.

== Anti-vivisection ==
Snow was a germ theory denialist, anti-vaccinationist and opponent of circumcision and vivisection. In 1908, he was appointed surgeon to the National Anti-Vivisection Hospital in Battersea. Snow was chairman of the British Section of the International Medical Anti-Vivisection Association.

== Selected publications ==
- Clinical Notes on Cancer: Its Etiology and Treatment (1883)
- The General Theory of Cancer-Formation (1889)
- The Barbarity of Circumcision as a Remedy for Congenital Abnormality (1890)
- The Proclivity of Women to Cancerous Diseases and to Certain Benign Tumours (1891)
- On the Utter Futility of Vivisection as a Means of Promoting Medical Science (1908)
