= Obocell =

20th-century drug for weight loss

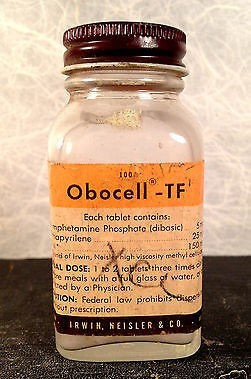
Obocell bottle

Obocell is the brand name of a CNS stimulant and appetite suppressant (d-amphetamine phosphate) combined into one pill with a CNS depressant and first generation antihistamine (25mg methapyrilene). This combination formula was developed by Neisler Laboratories in 1951, approved for medical use in the United States by the U.S. Food and Drug Administration in 1953 to treat obesity. According to the National Institutes of Health, production or availability of Obocell was discontinued around 1967. It was approved for medical use in the U.S. in 1953, and available for over the counter sales between 1953 and 1967, in the dosage form of a tablet, and indicated for treating obesity in patients by functioning as an appetite suppressant.

== Indication and use ==
Obocell's formulation of active ingredients included a substituted amphetamine (5mg dextroamphetamine phosphate (a central nervous system/CNS stimulant and 25mg methapyrilene (a first generation H_{1}-antihistamine) produced as a single tablet containing the 5mg:25mg dosage ratio, directed for oral consumption. A similar, yet distinct, product was marketed by Irwin, Neisler & Co. called Obocell-TF, which also included a ratio of 5mg dextroamphetamine phosphate and 25mg methapyrilene, with an additional component being Irwin, Neisler & Co.'s high-viscosity methylcellulose product (Nicel brand).

== Treatment indication and medical use ==
Both formulations were FDA-approved in the United States as treatments of obesity. Full therapeutic effect as an appetite suppressant was achieved by consuming the medication thirty to sixty minutes prior to each meal. The manufacturer-recommended dosage was one or two tablets, to be taken with a full glass of water three times daily. Nitrin (Irwin, Neisler & Company's brand of high-viscosity methylcellulose) provided additional benefits, such as cardioprotective antioxidants and contributed dietary fiber. Obocell-TF with methylcellulose had the added benefit of protecting cardiovascular health and reducing constipation.

Both medications have since been discontinued, although the exact year has not yet been identified.

== Advertising ==
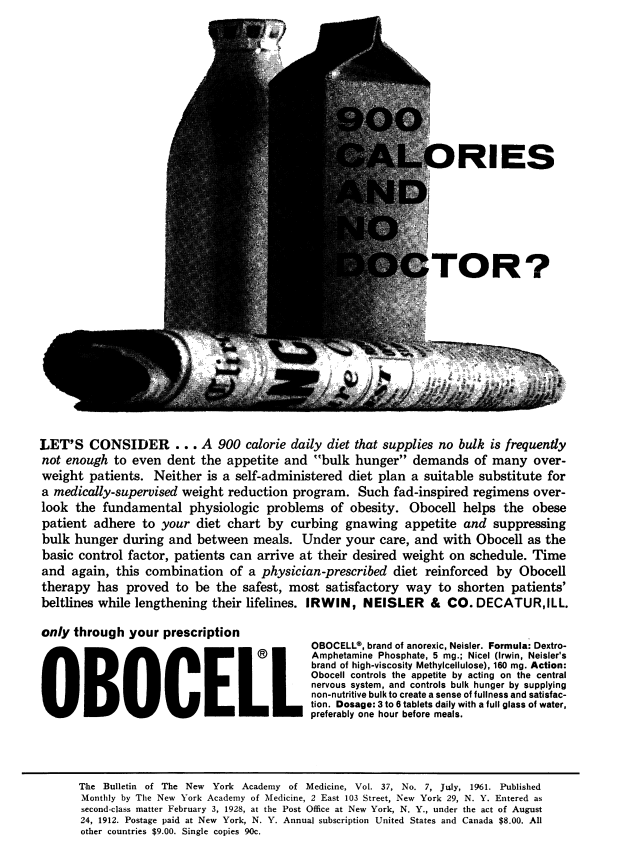
Obocell ad from 1961

In an advertisement published by the New York Academy of Medicine, whose target audience was physicians, Obocell was touted as "helping the obese patient adhere to your diet chart by curbing gnawing appetite and suppressing bulk hunger during and between meals". It was advertised to physicians with portly figurines called "Mr. Obocell" and "Mrs. Obocell."
