= Prochlorperazine =

Medication for nausea, psychosis, and anxiety

Clinical data
- Trade names: Compazine, Stemetil, others
- AHFS/Drugs.com: Monograph
- MedlinePlus: a682116
- License data: US DailyMed: Prochlorperazine
- Pregnancy category: AU: C
- Routes of administration: Oral administration, rectal administration, intramuscular injection, intravenous injection (IV)
- Drug class: Typical antipsychotic
- ATC code: N05AB04 (WHO)

Legal status
- Legal status: AU: S4 (Prescription only) / S3; BR: Class C1 (Other controlled substances); UK: POM (Prescription only) / P; US: ℞-only

Pharmacokinetic data
- Bioavailability: Unknown, but presumed substantial
- Protein binding: 91–99%
- Metabolism: Mainly Liver (CYP2D6 and/or CYP3A4)
- Elimination half-life: 4–8 hours, differs with the method of administration; 24 hours accounting for enterohepatic recirculation
- Excretion: Bile duct, (colored) inactive metabolites in urine

Identifiers
- IUPAC name: 2-chloro-10-[3-(4-methyl-1-piperazinyl)propyl]-10H-phenothiazine
- CAS Number: 58-38-8
- PubChem CID: 4917
- IUPHAR/BPS: 7279
- DrugBank: DB00433
- ChemSpider: 4748
- UNII: YHP6YLT61T
- KEGG: D00493
- ChEBI: CHEBI:8435
- ChEMBL: ChEMBL728
- CompTox Dashboard (EPA): DTXSID7023514
- ECHA InfoCard: 100.000.345

Chemical and physical data
- Formula: C_{20}H_{24}ClN_{3}S
- Molar mass: 373.94 g·mol^{−1}
- 3D model (JSmol): Interactive image
- SMILES: Clc2cc1N(c3c(Sc1cc2)cccc3)CCCN4CCN(C)CC4
- InChI: InChI=1S/C20H24ClN3S/c1-22-11-13-23(14-12-22)9-4-10-24-17-5-2-3-6-19(17)25-20-8-7-16(21)15-18(20)24/h2-3,5-8,15H,4,9-14H2,1H3; Key:WIKYUJGCLQQFNW-UHFFFAOYSA-N

Prochlorperazine, formerly sold under the brand name Compazine among others, is a medication used to treat nausea, migraines, schizophrenia, psychosis and anxiety. It is a less preferred medication for anxiety. It may be taken by mouth, rectally, injection into a vein, or injection into a muscle.

Common side effects include sleepiness, blurry vision, low blood pressure, and dizziness. Serious side effects may include movement disorders including tardive dyskinesia and neuroleptic malignant syndrome. Use in pregnancy and breastfeeding is generally not recommended. It is a typical antipsychotic which is believed to work by reducing the action of dopamine in the brain.

Prochlorperazine was approved for medical use in the United States in 1956. It is available as a generic medication. In 2020, it was the 355th most commonly prescribed medication in the United States, with more than 600 thousand prescriptions.

== Medical uses ==
=== Vomiting ===
Prochlorperazine is used to prevent vomiting caused by chemotherapy, radiation therapy and in the pre- and postoperative setting. A 2015 Cochrane review found no differences in efficacy among drugs commonly used for this purpose in emergency rooms.

=== Migraine ===
Prochlorperazine, generally by the intravenous route, is used to treat migraine. Such use is recommended by The American Headache Society. A 2019 systematic review found prochlorperazine was nearly three times more likely than metoclopramide to relieve headache within 60 minutes of administration.

=== Labyrinthitis ===
In the UK prochlorperazine maleate has been used for labyrinthitis, which includes nausea and vertigo.

== Side effects ==
Sedation is very common, and extrapyramidal side effects are common and include restlessness, dystonic reactions, pseudoparkinsonism, and akathisia; the extrapyramidal symptoms can affect 2% of people at low doses, whereas higher doses may affect as many as 40% of people.

Prochlorperazine can also cause a life-threatening condition called neuroleptic malignant syndrome (NMS). Some symptoms of NMS include high fever, stiff muscles, neck muscle spasms, confusion, irregular pulse or blood pressure, fast heart rate (tachycardia), sweating, and abnormal heart rhythms (arrhythmias). Research from the Veterans Administration and the United States Food and Drug Administration show injection site reactions. Adverse effects are similar in children.

The FDA-approved label for prochlorperazine includes a warning for increased risk of mortality in elderly patients with dementia-related psychosis.

=== Discontinuation ===
The British National Formulary recommends a gradual withdrawal when discontinuing antipsychotics to avoid acute withdrawal syndrome or rapid relapse. Symptoms of withdrawal commonly include nausea, vomiting, and loss of appetite. Other symptoms may include restlessness, increased sweating, and trouble sleeping. Less commonly there may be a feeling of the world spinning, numbness, or muscle pains. Symptoms generally resolve after a short period of time.

There is tentative evidence that discontinuation of antipsychotics can result in psychosis. It may also result in reoccurrence of the condition that is being treated. Rarely tardive dyskinesia can occur when the medication is stopped.

== Pharmacology ==
Prochlorperazine
Site	Ki (nM)	Species	Ref
5-HT_{1A}	5,888	Human	
5-HT_{2A}	7.24	Human	
5-HT_{2C}	123	Human	
5-HT_{3}	1349	Human	
5-HT_{6}	148	Human	
5-HT_{7}	6,760	Human	
α_{1}	24	Human	
α_{2}	1700	Human	
M_{1}	776	Human	
M_{2}	1413	Human	
D_{1}	251	Human	
D_{2}	2.24	Human	
D_{3}	1.82	Human	
D_{4}	5.37	Human	
H_{1}	6.03	Human	
H_{3}	17,378	Human	
H_{4}	17783	Human	
DAT	589	Human	
NET	600	Rat	

Prochlorperazine is thought to exert its antipsychotic effects by blocking dopamine receptors.

Prochlorperazine is analogous to chlorpromazine; both of these agents antagonize dopaminergic D_{2} receptors in various pathways of the central nervous system. This D_{2} blockade results in antipsychotic, antiemetic and other effects. Hyperprolactinemia is a side effect of dopamine antagonists as blockade of D_{2} receptors within the tuberoinfundibular pathway results in increased plasma levels of prolactin due to increased secretion by lactotrophs in the anterior pituitary.

Following intramuscular injection, the antiemetic action is evident within 5 to 10 minutes and lasts for three to four hours. Rapid action is also noted after buccal treatment. With oral dosing, the start of action is delayed but the duration is somewhat longer (approximately six hours).

== Society and culture ==
In the United Kingdom, prochlorperazine is available for the treatment of nausea caused by migraine as a tablet dissolved in the mouth, and in Australia as a tablet swallowed whole. In the UK, it is available via a prescription and as a pharmacy medicine, meaning it does not require a prescription but is only available after talking with a pharmacist.

=== Marketing ===
Prochlorperazine is available as tablets, suppositories, and in an injectable form.

As of September 2017 it was marketed under the trade names Ametil, Antinaus, Buccastem, Bukatel, Chlormeprazine, Chloropernazine, Compazine, Compro, Daolin, Dhaperazine, Emedrotec, Emetiral, Eminorm, Lotamin, Mitil, Mormal, Nautisol, Novamin, Novomit, Proazine, Procalm, Prochlorperazin, Prochlorperazine, Prochlorpérazine, Prochlorperazinum, Prochlozine, Proclorperazina, Promat, Promin, Promtil, Roumin, Scripto-metic, Seratil, Stemetil, Steremal, Vergon, Vestil, and Volimin.

=== Historical formulations ===
Prochlorperazine was combined with paracetamol and marketed for humans as the combination drug Vestil-A; it was combined with isopropamide (brand name Darbazine) as a combination drug for veterinary use.

Until 1981, a combination diet pill composed of prochlorperazine and dextroamphetamine was marketed as Eskatrol in the United States by Smith, Kline & French Laboratories.

== Research ==
Alexza Pharmaceuticals studied an inhaled form of prochlorperazine for the treatment of migraine through Phase II trials under the development name AT-001; development was discontinued in 2011.

== Synthesis ==
Thieme Synthesis: Patent:

The alkylation of 2-chlorophenothiazine (1) and 1-(3-Chloropropyl)-4-methylpiperazine [104-16-5] (2) in the presence of sodamide gives Prochlorperazine (3); or by alkylation of 2-Chloro-10-(3-chloropropyl)phenothiazine [2765-59-5] (4) and 1-methylpiperazine (5).
