= Brompton cocktail =

Obsolete pain suppressant elixir

Brompton cocktail, sometimes called Brompton mixture or Brompton's cocktail, was an elixir meant for use as a pain suppressant dosed for prophylaxis. Made from morphine or diacetylmorphine (heroin), cocaine, highly pure ethyl alcohol (some recipes specify gin), a syrup to help mask the bitter taste, and sometimes chlorpromazine (Thorazine) to counteract nausea, it was given to terminally ill people (especially cancer patients) to relieve pain and promote sociability near death. A common formulation included "a variable amount of morphine, 10 mg of cocaine, 2.5 mL of 98% ethyl alcohol, 5 mL of syrup BP and a variable amount of chloroform water”. Brompton's cocktail was given most in the mid-twentieth century. It is now considered obsolete.

In popular culture it also came to be associated with medical euthanasia. According to legend (and perhaps in fact) doctors would provide a large dose to terminally ill patients who wished to die.

== History ==
The original idea for an oral mixture of morphine and cocaine helping patients in agony with advanced disease is credited to surgeon Herbert Snow in 1896. The Brompton cocktail is named after the Royal Brompton Hospital in London, England, where the formulation of this mixture was standardized in the late 1920s for patients with cancer. It was in common use in the late 19th and early 20th centuries. However a series of trials in 1977–79 found that the diacetylmorphine was no more effective than an equivalent amount of morphine, whilst tolerance caused the cocaine to become ineffective within a few days. As a result, pain management shifted to using morphine alone, which is more convenient to prepare and easier to titrate, and avoids side effects. While use of the Brompton cocktail has been rare in the 21st century, it is not entirely unheard of today.

== Variants ==
Some specifications for variants of Brompton cocktail call for methadone, hydromorphone, diamorphine (heroin), or other strong opioids in the place of morphine; diphenhydramine or tincture of cannabis in place of the chlorpromazine; and methamphetamine, amphetamine, dextroamphetamine, co-phenylcaine (lidocaine and phenylephrine hydrochloride), methylphenidate or other stimulants in the place of cocaine. The original recipe for Brompton cocktail also calls for chloroform, cherry syrup to help mask the bitter taste of some of the components, and distilled water in some quantity to dilute the chloroform (hence chloroform water) or to add volume to allow for more precise titration of doses.

== See also ==
- Palliative care
- Pain management
- Speedball (drug) and laudanum (tincture of opium)
