= Obetrol =

Diet pill

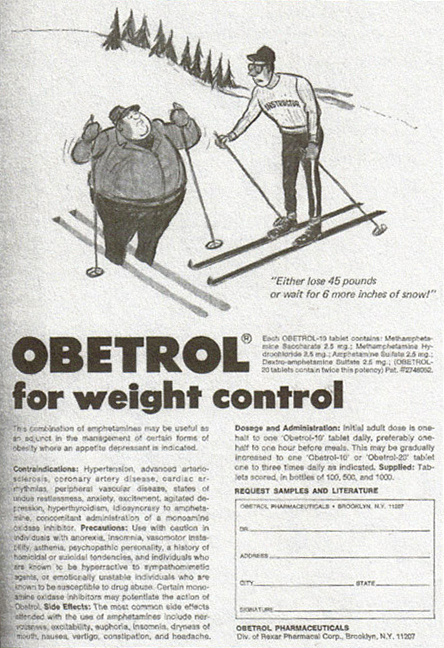
- 1970 advertisement for Obetrol

Combination of
- Dextroamphetamine: Psychostimulant
- Amphetamine: Psychostimulant
- Methamphetamine: Psychostimulant

Clinical data
- Routes of administration: Oral

Legal status
- Legal status: US: Schedule II

Identifiers
- ChemSpider: none

Obetrol was the brand name of a drug combining several amphetamine salts indicated for the treatment of exogenous obesity. It was originally sold by the American company Obetrol Pharmaceuticals. Obetrol was a popular diet pill in America in the 1950s and 1960s.

The original formulation of amphetamine mixed salts and methamphetamine was approved by the U.S. Food and Drug Administration (FDA) on January 19, 1960, under the name Obetrol. Indicated for exogenous obesity, between 1965 and 1973, Obetrol was marketed in 10 mg and 20 mg strength through Obetrol Pharmaceuticals division of the American pharmaceutical company Rexar. When sold directly to physicians, Obetrol used the brand name Oby-Rex.

== Formulations ==
=== Original ===
In the 1950s, Obetrol was manufactured by Obetrol Pharmaceuticals, in Brooklyn, New York. The company later became a division of Rexar Pharmacal Corporation, which was also headquartered in Brooklyn. Sometime prior to 1972, Rexar Pharmacal moved its manufacturing facilities, including its Obetrol Pharmaceutical Division, to Valley Stream, New York. By the 1990s, Obetrol Pharmaceuticals had been wholly absorbed by Rexar Pharmacal and was no longer noted as a division of Rexar. In 1993, Rexar was acquired by Richwood Pharmaceuticals of Florence, Kentucky, which in 1995 merged with Shire Pharmaceuticals.

The 1972 edition of the Physicians' Desk Reference lists Obetrol containing (10 mg tablet):

- 2.5 mg methamphetamine saccharate
- 2.5 mg methamphetamine hydrochloride
- 2.5 mg racemic amphetamine sulfate
- 2.5 mg dextroamphetamine sulfate

Obetrol was also available in 20 mg tablets which contained twice the quantity of its ingredients, in the same proportions. The 10 mg tablets were blue, and the 20 mg were orange. Both were inscribed with the letters "OP".

In 1970 the FDA issued an order requiring new drug applications for previously approved amphetamine products. The FDA was critical of combinations of amphetamines and non-amphetamines, but also considered amphetamine and methamphetamine mixtures a combination drug, and required the ingredients to be effective and safe individually and in combination. In September 1973 the FDA withdrew approval for Obetrol under the FDA Drug Efficacy Study Implementation program. The FDA cited the research submitted was vague, subjective, lacking controls or poorly controlled, incomplete, did not test individual ingredients, and had other deficiencies.

=== Modified ===
Because FDA considered combinations of amphetamine and dextroamphetamine salt a single entity, Rexar simply reformulated Obetrol to exclude methamphetamine salts and continued to sell this new formulation under the same Obetrol brand name. This new unapproved formulation was later rebranded and sold as Adderall by Richwood after it acquired Rexar resulting in FDA warning in 1994. Richwood resubmitted this formulation as NDA 11-522 and Adderall gained FDA approval for the treatment of attention-deficit/hyperactivity disorder on February 13, 1996.

The reformulated Obetrol (and Adderall) contained equal portions of:

- Dextroamphetamine sulfate
- Dextroamphetamine saccharine
- Amphetamine sulfate
- Amphetamine aspartate

These tablets were also blue and orange, and were inscribed with the numbers "32" and "33" respectively.

When Richwood acquired Rexar, the drug's name was changed from Obetrol to Adderall, and the drug was marketed for use in the treatment of Attention Deficit Disorder (in both children and adults). The old Rexar facility underwent extensive renovations and improvements, and continued to manufacture the drug for several years. During these years, the drug Adderall was identical to the most recent formulation of Obetrol, except that the inscription on the pills was changed to "AD".

Sometime after 2000, Shire closed the Rexar manufacturing facility, discontinued immediate-release Adderall and outsourced Adderall XR (extended-release) to a manufacturer in North Carolina. Other companies had begun manufacturing generic versions of Adderall, and the trade name was eventually sold to Barr Pharmaceuticals (acquired by Teva in 2008).

There is no drug commercially marketed called Obetrol at this time, nor has there been since Richwood acquired Rexar Pharmacal.

== Abuse ==
The ready availability of methamphetamine-based medications in the 1960s led to their use and abuse as recreational drugs. Obetrol was the recreational drug of choice for artist Andy Warhol. Obetrol was abused by a character named Chris Fogle in David Foster Wallace's novel The Pale King. "Obetrolling" or "doubling" were the terms used by the character to refer to getting wired on Obetrol, which increased his self-awareness and made him feel alive.
