= Tuinal =

Combination drug

Secobarbital/amobarbital

Combination of
- Secobarbital: Short-acting barbiturate
- Amobarbital: Short- to intermediate-acting barbiturate

Clinical data
- Trade names: Tuinal
- Routes of administration: By mouth

Legal status
- Legal status: US: Schedule II

Identifiers
- CAS Number: 8065-05-2
- PubChem CID: 3080650

Chemical and physical data
- 3D model (JSmol): Interactive image
- SMILES: CCCC(C)C1(C(=O)NC(=O)N=C1[O-])CC=C.CCC1(C(=O)NC(=O)N=C1[O-])CCC(C)C.[Na+].[Na+]
- InChI: InChI=1S/C12H18N2O3.C11H18N2O3.2Na/c1-4-6-8(3)12(7-5-2)9(15)13-11(17)14-10(12)16;1-4-11(6-5-7(2)3)8(14)12-10(16)13-9(11)15;;/h5,8H,2,4,6-7H2,1,3H3,(H2,13,14,15,16,17);7H,4-6H2,1-3H3,(H2,12,13,14,15,16);;/q;;2*+1/p-2; Key:HQBIOVWPIHUNKN-UHFFFAOYSA-L

Tuinal was the brand name of a discontinued combination drug composed of two barbiturate sodium salts (secobarbital and amobarbital) in equal proportions.

Tuinal was introduced as a sedative–hypnotic (sleeping pill) medication in the late 1940s by Eli Lilly. It was also used in obstetrics for childbirth. It was produced in brightly colored half-reddish orange and half-turquoise blue gelatin capsule form (bullet-shaped Pulvules) for oral administration. Individual capsules contained 50 mg, 100 mg, or 200 mg of barbiturate salts. The combination of a short-acting barbiturate, secobarbital, with an intermediate-acting barbiturate, amobarbital, aimed to provide "a rapid yet prolonged hypnotic action".

Eli Lilly has discontinued the manufacture of Tuinal in the United States due to the diminishing use of barbiturates (largely replaced by the benzodiazepine family of drugs) in outpatient treatment, and its widespread abuse. Currently, Valleant Labs markets secobarbital capsules only. Flynn Pharma of Ireland no longer manufactures Tuinal, Seconal (secobarbital), or Amytal (amobarbital). Amytal has been discontinued, though injectable forms of amobarbital sodium remain.

== Society and culture ==
The drug was featured in "Psycho Therapy," a song by the musical band Ramones, who stated "I like takin' Tuinal/It keeps me edgy and mean/I'm a teenage schizoid/I'm a teenage dope fiend."

It is also mentioned in "Lost Johnny" a song by the band Hawkwind in the last verse, "And we're all taking Tuinal/to murder our young dreams."

Most famously, Tuinal is mentioned by Shane MacGowan in the song "Old Main Drag" by The Pogues.

Tuinal is mentioned in Fight Club by Chuck Palahniuk: "I just wanted to sleep. I wanted little blue Amytal Sodium capsules, 200-milligram-sized. I wanted red-and-blue Tuinal bullet capsules, lipstick-red Seconal."

Tuinal describes some people in the song "New Sensations" by Lou Reed.

Tuinal is mentioned in the song "Doctor Rockter" by the band W.A.S.P., in which the narrator details his rampant drug abuse and dealer. "Cocaine, codeine, 714/a Tuinal blindfold, just what I need."

=== Abuse ===
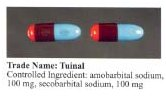

Tuinal saw widespread abuse as a recreational drug from the 1960s through the 1980s. The pill was known colloquially under the street names "tuies", "tumies", "double trouble", "blue tips", " F-66's" (which were the markings on Lilly's capsule), "rainbows", "beans", "nawls" and "jeebs". Like other barbiturate depressants, Tuinal promotes physical and psychological dependency beginning after one week of regular use and carries a high risk of overdose. It was reported in the 1980s as one of the most common ways of self-poisoning. Abuse of this particular drug tapered off after it was discontinued by manufacturers in the late 1990s.

Tuinal is classified as a Schedule II drug under the Controlled Substances Act in the United States, meaning it requires a prescription from a licensed practitioner.
