= D-IX =

Experimental sex drug and performance enhancer developed in Nazi Germany

Combination of
- Oxycodone: analgesic
- Cocaine: stimulant
- Methamphetamine: stimulant

D-IX is a methamphetamine-based experimental performance enhancer developed by Nazi Germany in 1944 for military application. The researcher who rediscovered this project, Wolf Kemper, said, "the aim was to use D-IX to redefine the limits of human endurance." One dose contained 5 mg oxycodone (brand name Eukodal, an analgesic opioid), 5 mg cocaine, and 3 mg methamphetamine (brand name Pervitin).

German doctors were enthusiastic about the results, and planned to supply all German troops with the pills, but the war ended before D-IX could be put into mass production, though it did see limited use among a handful of Neger and Biber pilots.

== History ==
Due to increased Allied pressure on the German war effort, Nazi Germany had grown desperate for more soldiers, and one way to mitigate the massive losses was to increase the combative power of existing Wehrmacht soldiers. Though simpler drugs, such as Pervitin and Isophan, helped to keep soldiers stimulated, in March 1944, Vice Admiral Hellmuth Heye requested a drug that could also give users superhuman strength and a boosted sense of self-esteem.

Pharmacologist Gerhard Orzechowski, and a group of other researchers, were commissioned to develop the drug in Kiel, and by later that year, had developed a formula that contained, in each tablet, 5 mg of oxycodone, 5 mg of cocaine, and 3 mg of methamphetamine.

== See also ==
- List of drugs used by militaries
