= Dextroamphetamine =

CNS stimulant and isomer of amphetamine

Dextroamphetamine INN: Dexamfetamine

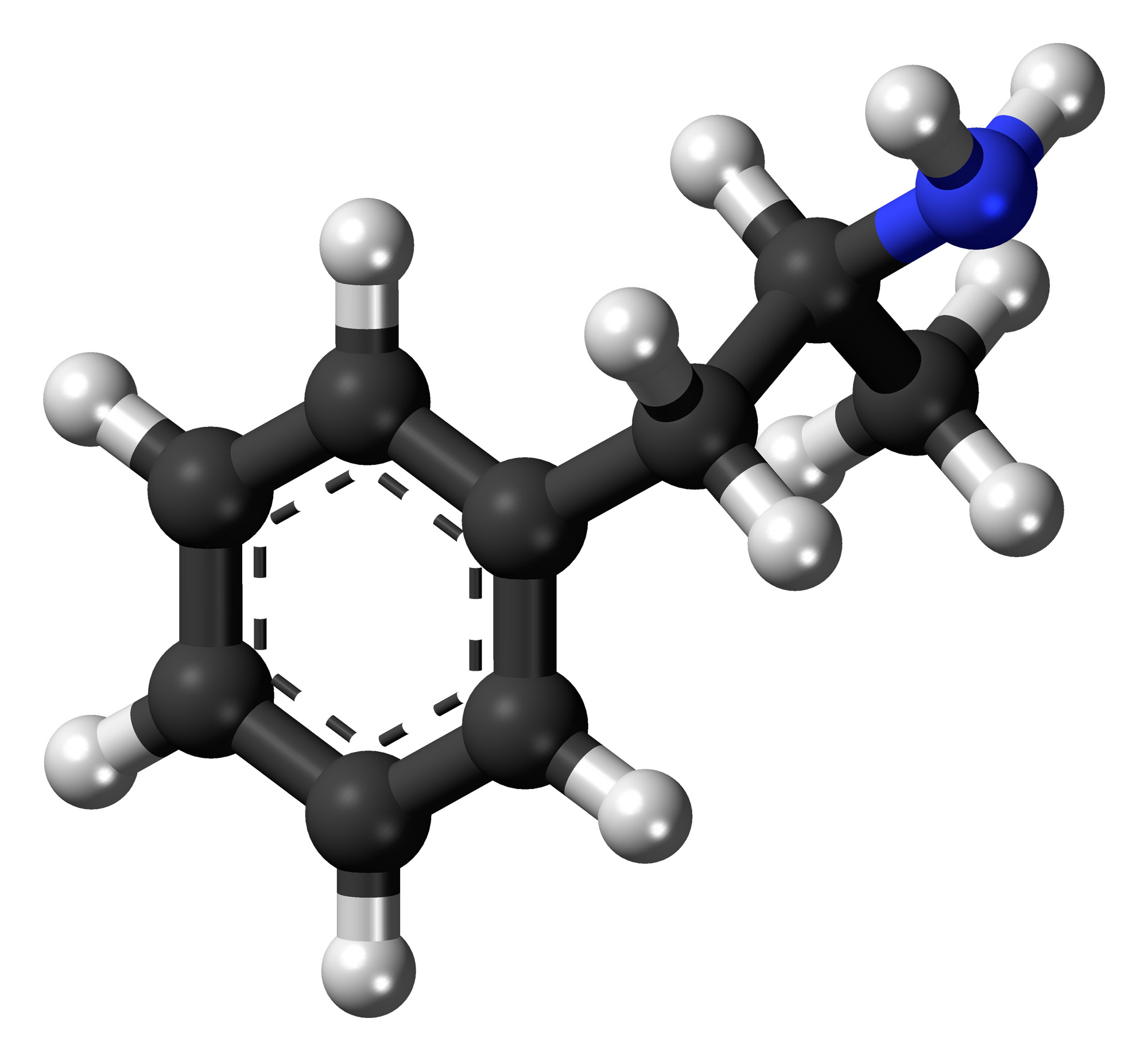

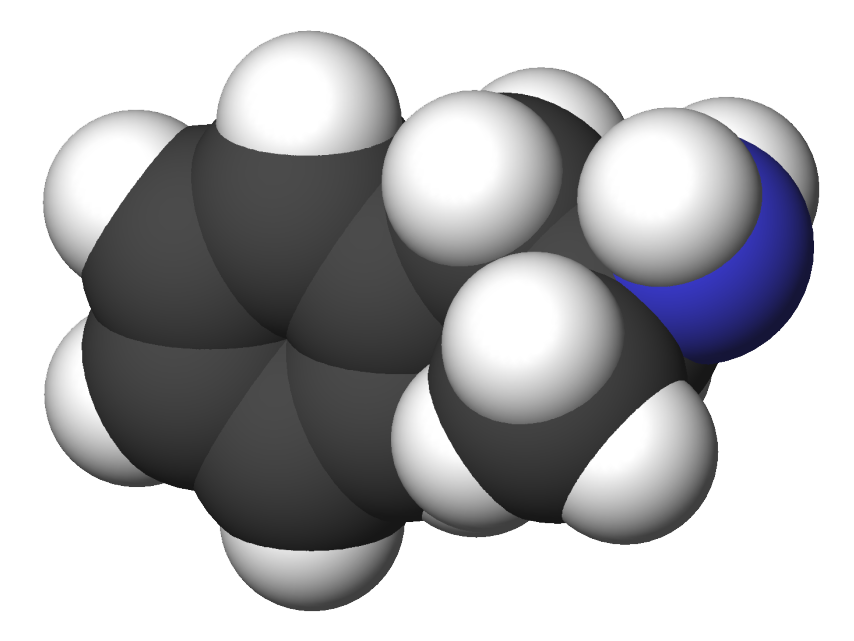

Clinical data
- Pronunciation: /ˌdɛkstroʊæmˈfɛtəmiːn/
- Trade names: Dexedrine, Zenzedi, others
- Other names: d-Amphetamine, (S)-Amphetamine, S(+)-Amphetamine
- AHFS/Drugs.com: Monograph
- MedlinePlus: a605027
- License data: US DailyMed: Dextroamphetamine
- Pregnancy category: AU: B3
- Dependence liability: Physical: None; Psychological: Moderate
- Addiction liability: Moderate
- Routes of administration: By mouth, transdermal, intravenous, insufflation, rectal
- Drug class: Stimulant
- ATC code: N06BA02 (WHO)

Legal status
- Legal status: AU: S8 (Controlled drug); BR: Class A3 (Psychoactive drugs); CA: ℞-only / Schedule G (CDSA I); DE: Anlage III (Special prescription form required); UK: Class B; US: Schedule II; UN: Psychotropic Schedule II; EU: Rx-only; SE: Förteckning II

Pharmacokinetic data
- Bioavailability: Oral: ~90%
- Protein binding: 15–40%
- Metabolism: CYP2D6, DBH, FMO3
- Metabolites: 4-Hydroxyamphetamine
- Onset of action: IR dosing: 30–45 minutes XR dosing: 1.5–2 hours
- Elimination half-life: 9–11 hours pH-dependent: 7–34 hours
- Duration of action: IR dosing: 3–6 hours XR dosing: 8–12 hours
- Excretion: Kidney (45%); urinary pH-dependent

Identifiers
- IUPAC name: (2S)-1-Phenylpropan-2-amine
- CAS Number: 51-64-9
- PubChem CID: 5826
- IUPHAR/BPS: 2147
- DrugBank: DB01576
- ChemSpider: 5621
- UNII: TZ47U051FI
- KEGG: D03740
- ChEBI: CHEBI:4469
- ChEMBL: ChEMBL612
- CompTox Dashboard (EPA): DTXSID8022907
- ECHA InfoCard: 100.000.103

Chemical and physical data
- Formula: C_{9}H_{13}N
- Molar mass: 135.210 g·mol^{−1}
- 3D model (JSmol): Interactive image
- Chirality: Dextrorotatory enantiomer
- Density: 0.913 g/cm^{3}
- Boiling point: 201.5 °C (394.7 °F)
- Solubility in water: 20mg per ml
- SMILES: C[C@@H](Cc1ccccc1)N
- InChI: InChI=1S/C9H13N/c1-8(10)7-9-5-3-2-4-6-9/h2-6,8H,7,10H2,1H3/t8-/m0/s1; Key:KWTSXDURSIMDCE-QMMMGPOBSA-N

Dextroamphetamine is a central nervous system (CNS) stimulant and enantiomer of amphetamine that is used in the treatment of attention deficit hyperactivity disorder (ADHD) and narcolepsy. It is also used illicitly to enhance cognitive and athletic performance, and recreationally as an aphrodisiac and euphoriant. Dextroamphetamine is generally regarded as the prototypical stimulant.

The amphetamine molecule exists as two enantiomers, levoamphetamine and dextroamphetamine. Dextroamphetamine is the dextrorotatory, or 'right-handed', enantiomer and exhibits more pronounced effects on the central nervous system than levoamphetamine. Pharmaceutical dextroamphetamine sulfate is available as both a brand name and generic drug in a variety of dosage forms. Dextroamphetamine is sometimes prescribed as the inactive prodrug lisdexamfetamine.

Side effects of dextroamphetamine at therapeutic doses include elevated mood, decreased appetite, dry mouth, bruxism, headache, increased heart rate, insomnia, anxiety, and irritability, among others. At excessive doses, psychosis (i.e., hallucinations, delusions), addiction, and rapid muscle breakdown may occur. For individuals with pre-existing psychotic disorders, there may be a risk of psychosis even at therapeutic doses.

Dextroamphetamine, like other amphetamines, elicits its stimulating effects via several distinct actions: it inhibits or reverses the transporter proteins for the monoamine neurotransmitters (namely the serotonin, norepinephrine and dopamine transporters) either via trace amine-associated receptor 1 (TAAR1) or in a TAAR1 independent fashion when there are high cytosolic concentrations of the monoamine neurotransmitters and it releases these neurotransmitters from synaptic vesicles via vesicular monoamine transporter 2 (VMAT2). It also shares many chemical and pharmacological properties with human trace amines, particularly phenethylamine and N-methylphenethylamine, the latter being an isomer of amphetamine produced within the human body. It is available as a generic medication. In 2023, mixed amphetamine salts (Adderall) was the 15th most commonly prescribed medication in the United States, with more than 32 million prescriptions.

== Uses ==
=== Medical ===
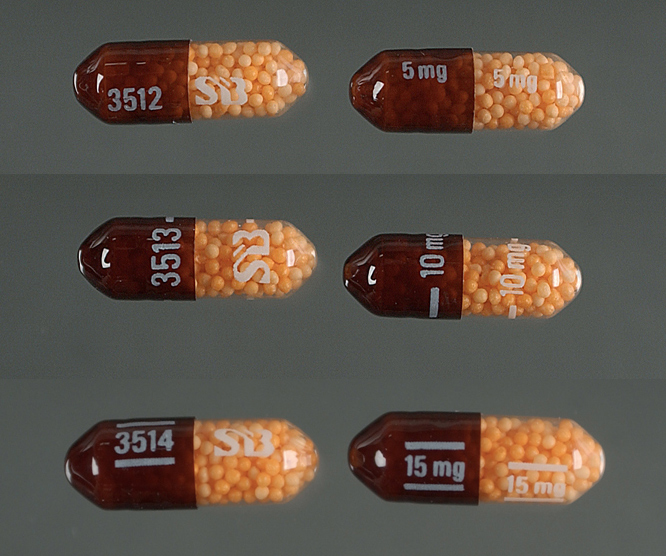
Dexedrine Spansule 5, 10, and 15 mg capsules, a sustained-release dosage form of dextroamphetamine

Dextroamphetamine is used to treat attention deficit hyperactivity disorder (ADHD) and narcolepsy, and is sometimes prescribed off-label for depression and obesity.

==== ADHD ====
Long-term amphetamine exposure at sufficiently high doses in some animal species is known to produce abnormal dopamine system development or nerve damage, but, in humans with ADHD, long-term use of pharmaceutical amphetamines at therapeutic doses appears to improve brain development and nerve growth. Reviews of magnetic resonance imaging (MRI) studies suggest that long-term treatment with amphetamine decreases abnormalities in brain structure and function found in subjects with ADHD, and improves function in several parts of the brain, such as the right caudate nucleus of the basal ganglia.

Reviews of clinical stimulant research have established the safety and effectiveness of long-term continuous amphetamine use for the treatment of ADHD. Randomized controlled trials of continuous stimulant therapy for the treatment of ADHD spanning 2 years have demonstrated treatment effectiveness and safety. Two reviews have indicated that long-term continuous stimulant therapy for ADHD is effective for reducing the core symptoms of ADHD (i.e., hyperactivity, inattention, and impulsivity), enhancing quality of life and academic achievement, and producing improvements in a large number of functional outcomes (Note: The ADHD-related outcome domains with the greatest proportion of significantly improved outcomes from long-term continuous stimulant therapy include academics (≈55% of academic outcomes improved), driving (100% of driving outcomes improved), non-medical drug use (47% of addiction-related outcomes improved), obesity (≈65% of obesity-related outcomes improved), self-esteem (50% of self-esteem outcomes improved), and social function (67% of social function outcomes improved). The largest effect sizes for outcome improvements from long-term stimulant therapy occur in the domains involving academics (e.g., grade point average, achievement test scores, length of education, and education level), self-esteem (e.g., self-esteem questionnaire assessments, number of suicide attempts, and suicide rates), and social function (e.g., peer nomination scores, social skills, and quality of peer, family, and romantic relationships). Long-term combination therapy for ADHD (i.e., treatment with both a stimulant and behavioral therapy) produces even larger effect sizes for outcome improvements and improves a larger proportion of outcomes across each domain compared to long-term stimulant therapy alone. These findings were further supported by a 2025 review of interventions for adolescents, which concluded that medications and cognitive-behavioral treatments (CBT) provide complementary benefits. Medications demonstrated strong short-term efficacy on core symptoms, while CBT contributed modest to strong, and sometimes long-lasting, improvements in functional impairments and executive skills when used as part of combination therapy.) across 9 categories of outcomes related to academics, antisocial behavior, driving, non-medicinal drug use, obesity, occupation, self-esteem, service use (i.e., academic, occupational, health, financial, and legal services), and social function. Additionally, a 2024 meta-analytic systematic review reported moderate improvements in quality of life when amphetamine treatment is used for ADHD. One review highlighted a nine-month randomized controlled trial of amphetamine treatment for ADHD in children that found an average increase of 4.5 IQ points, continued increases in attention, and continued decreases in disruptive behaviors and hyperactivity. Another review indicated that, based upon the longest follow-up studies conducted to date, lifetime stimulant therapy that begins during childhood is continuously effective for controlling ADHD symptoms and reduces the risk of developing a substance use disorder as an adult.

Models of ADHD suggest that it is associated with functional impairments in some of the brain's neurotransmitter systems; these functional impairments involve impaired dopamine neurotransmission in the mesocorticolimbic projection and norepinephrine neurotransmission in the noradrenergic projections from the locus coeruleus to the prefrontal cortex. Stimulants like methylphenidate and amphetamine are effective in treating ADHD because they increase neurotransmitter activity in these systems. Approximately 80% of those who use these stimulants see improvements in ADHD symptoms. Children with ADHD who use stimulant medications generally have better relationships with peers and family members, perform better in school, are less distractible and impulsive, and have longer attention spans. The Cochrane reviews (Note: Cochrane reviews are high quality meta-analytic systematic reviews of randomized controlled trials.) on the treatment of ADHD in children, adolescents, and adults with pharmaceutical amphetamines stated that short-term studies have demonstrated that these drugs decrease the severity of symptoms, but they have higher discontinuation rates than non-stimulant medications due to their adverse side effects. However, a 2025 meta-analytic systematic review of 113 randomized controlled trials found that stimulant medications were the only intervention with robust short-term efficacy, and were associated with lower all-cause treatment discontinuation rates than non-stimulant medications (e.g., atomoxetine). (Note: In contrast to the Cochrane reviews that observed higher treatment discontinuation from adverse effects alone, this figure represents any cause of discontinuation (e.g., insufficient perceived treatment benefit).) A Cochrane review on the treatment of ADHD in children with tic disorders such as Tourette syndrome indicated that stimulants in general do not make tics worse, but high doses of dextroamphetamine could exacerbate tics in some individuals.

==== Narcolepsy ====
Narcolepsy is a chronic sleep-wake disorder that is associated with excessive daytime sleepiness, cataplexy, and sleep paralysis. Patients with narcolepsy are diagnosed as either type 1 or type 2, with only the former presenting cataplexy symptoms. Type 1 narcolepsy results from the loss of approximately 70,000 orexin-releasing neurons in the lateral hypothalamus, leading to significantly reduced cerebrospinal orexin levels; this reduction is a diagnostic biomarker for type 1 narcolepsy. Lateral hypothalamic orexin neurons innervate every component of the ascending reticular activating system (ARAS), which includes noradrenergic, dopaminergic, histaminergic, and serotonergic nuclei that promote wakefulness.

Amphetamine's therapeutic mode of action in narcolepsy primarily involves increasing monoamine neurotransmitter activity in the ARAS. This includes noradrenergic neurons in the locus coeruleus, dopaminergic neurons in the ventral tegmental area, histaminergic neurons in the tuberomammillary nucleus, and serotonergic neurons in the dorsal raphe nucleus. Dextroamphetamine, the more dopaminergic enantiomer of amphetamine, is particularly effective at promoting wakefulness because dopamine release has the greatest influence on cortical activation and cognitive arousal, relative to other monoamines. In contrast, levoamphetamine may have a greater effect on cataplexy, a symptom more sensitive to the effects of norepinephrine and serotonin. Noradrenergic and serotonergic nuclei in the ARAS are involved in the regulation of the REM sleep cycle and function as "REM-off" cells, with amphetamine's effect on norepinephrine and serotonin contributing to the suppression of REM sleep and a possible reduction of cataplexy at high doses.

The American Academy of Sleep Medicine (AASM) 2021 clinical practice guideline conditionally recommends dextroamphetamine for the treatment of both type 1 and type 2 narcolepsy. Treatment with pharmaceutical amphetamines is generally less preferred relative to other stimulants (e.g., modafinil) and is considered a third-line treatment option. Medical reviews indicate that amphetamine is safe and effective for the treatment of narcolepsy. Amphetamine appears to be most effective at improving symptoms associated with hypersomnolence, with three reviews finding clinically significant reductions in daytime sleepiness in patients with narcolepsy. Additionally, these reviews suggest that amphetamine may dose-dependently improve cataplexy symptoms. However, the quality of evidence for these findings is low and is consequently reflected in the AASM's conditional recommendation for dextroamphetamine as a treatment option for narcolepsy.

=== Enhancing performance ===
==== Cognitive performance ====
In 2015, a systematic review and a meta-analysis of high quality clinical trials found that, when used at low (therapeutic) doses, amphetamine produces modest yet unambiguous improvements in cognition, including working memory, long-term episodic memory, inhibitory control, and some aspects of attention, in normal healthy adults; these cognition-enhancing effects of amphetamine are known to be partially mediated through the indirect activation of both dopamine D_{1} receptor and α_{2}-adrenergic receptor in the prefrontal cortex. A systematic review from 2014 found that low doses of amphetamine also improve memory consolidation, in turn leading to improved recall of information. Therapeutic doses of amphetamine also enhance cortical network efficiency, an effect which mediates improvements in working memory in all individuals. Amphetamine and other ADHD stimulants also improve task saliency (motivation to perform a task) and increase arousal (wakefulness), in turn promoting goal-directed behavior. Stimulants such as amphetamine can improve performance on difficult and boring tasks and are used by some students as a study and test-taking aid. Based upon studies of self-reported illicit stimulant use, 5–35% of college students use diverted ADHD stimulants, which are primarily used for enhancement of academic performance rather than as recreational drugs. However, high amphetamine doses that are above the therapeutic range can interfere with working memory and other aspects of cognitive control.

==== Physical performance ====
Amphetamine is used by some athletes for its psychological and athletic performance-enhancing effects, such as increased endurance and alertness; however, non-medical amphetamine use is prohibited at sporting events that are regulated by collegiate, national, and international anti-doping agencies. In healthy people at oral therapeutic doses, amphetamine has been shown to increase muscle strength, acceleration, athletic performance in anaerobic conditions, and endurance (i.e., it delays the onset of fatigue), while improving reaction time. Amphetamine improves endurance and reaction time primarily through reuptake inhibition and release of dopamine in the central nervous system. Amphetamine and other dopaminergic drugs also increase power output at fixed levels of perceived exertion by overriding a "safety switch", allowing the core temperature limit to increase in order to access a reserve capacity that is normally off-limits. At therapeutic doses, the adverse effects of amphetamine do not impede athletic performance; however, at much higher doses, amphetamine can induce effects that severely impair performance, such as rapid muscle breakdown and elevated body temperature.

=== Recreational ===
Dextroamphetamine is also used recreationally as a euphoriant and aphrodisiac, and, like other amphetamines, is used as a club drug for its energetic and euphoric high. Dextroamphetamine is considered to have a high potential for misuse in a recreational manner since individuals typically report feeling euphoric, more alert, and more energetic after taking the drug. Dextroamphetamine's dopaminergic (rewarding) properties affect the mesocorticolimbic circuit; a group of neural structures responsible for incentive salience (i.e., "wanting"; desire or craving for a reward and motivation), positive reinforcement and positively-valenced emotions, particularly ones involving pleasure. Large recreational doses of dextroamphetamine may produce dextroamphetamine overdose. Recreational users sometimes open dexedrine capsules and crush the contents in order to insufflate (snort) it or subsequently dissolve it in water and inject it. Immediate-release formulations have higher potential for abuse via insufflation (snorting) or intravenous injection due to a more favorable pharmacokinetic profile and easy crushability (especially tablets).

The reason for using crushed spansules for insufflation and injection methods is evidently due to the instant-release forms of the drug seen in tablet preparations often containing a sizable amount of inactive binders and fillers alongside the active d-amphetamine, such as dextrose. Injection into the bloodstream can be dangerous because insoluble fillers within the tablets can block small blood vessels. Chronic overuse of dextroamphetamine can lead to severe drug dependence, resulting in withdrawal symptoms when drug use stops.

== Contraindications ==
According to the International Programme on Chemical Safety (IPCS) and the U.S. Food and Drug Administration (FDA), (Note: The statements supported by the USFDA come from prescribing information, which is the copyrighted intellectual property of the manufacturer and approved by the USFDA. USFDA contraindications are not necessarily intended to limit medical practice but limit claims by pharmaceutical companies.) amphetamine is contraindicated in people with a history of drug abuse, (Note: According to one review, amphetamine can be prescribed to individuals with a history of abuse provided that appropriate medication controls are employed, such as requiring daily pick-ups of the medication from the prescribing physician.) cardiovascular disease, severe agitation, or severe anxiety. It is also contraindicated in individuals with advanced arteriosclerosis (hardening of the arteries), glaucoma (increased eye pressure), hyperthyroidism (excessive production of thyroid hormone), or moderate to severe hypertension. These agencies indicate that people who have experienced allergic reactions to other stimulants or who are taking monoamine oxidase inhibitors (MAOIs) should not take amphetamine, although safe concurrent use of amphetamine and monoamine oxidase inhibitors has been documented. These agencies also state that anyone with anorexia nervosa, bipolar disorder, depression, hypertension, liver or kidney problems, mania, psychosis, Raynaud's phenomenon, seizures, thyroid problems, tics, or Tourette syndrome should monitor their symptoms while taking amphetamine. Evidence from human studies indicates that therapeutic amphetamine use does not cause developmental abnormalities in the fetus or newborns (i.e., it is not a human teratogen), but amphetamine abuse does pose risks to the fetus. Amphetamine has also been shown to pass into breast milk, so the IPCS and the FDA advise mothers to avoid breastfeeding when using it. Due to the potential for reversible growth impairments, (Note: In individuals who experience sub-normal height and weight gains, a rebound to normal levels is expected to occur if stimulant therapy is briefly interrupted. The average reduction in final adult height from 3 years of continuous stimulant therapy is 2 cm.) the FDA advises monitoring the height and weight of children and adolescents prescribed an amphetamine pharmaceutical.

== Adverse effects ==
=== Physical ===
Cardiovascular side effects can include hypertension or hypotension from a vasovagal response, Raynaud's phenomenon (reduced blood flow to the hands and feet), and tachycardia (increased heart rate). Sexual side effects in males may include erectile dysfunction, frequent erections, or prolonged erections. Gastrointestinal side effects may include abdominal pain, constipation, diarrhea, and nausea. Other potential physical side effects include appetite loss, blurred vision, dry mouth, excessive grinding of the teeth, nosebleed, profuse sweating, rhinitis medicamentosa (drug-induced nasal congestion), reduced seizure threshold, tics (a type of movement disorder), and weight loss. Dangerous physical side effects are rare at typical pharmaceutical doses.

Amphetamine stimulates the medullary respiratory centers, producing faster and deeper breaths. In a normal person at therapeutic doses, this effect is usually not noticeable, but when respiration is already compromised, it may be evident. Amphetamine also induces contraction in the urinary bladder sphincter, the muscle which controls urination, which can result in difficulty urinating. This effect can be useful in treating bed wetting and loss of bladder control. The effects of amphetamine on the gastrointestinal tract are unpredictable. If intestinal activity is high, amphetamine may reduce gastrointestinal motility (the rate at which content moves through the digestive system); however, amphetamine may increase motility when the smooth muscle of the tract is relaxed. Amphetamine also has a slight analgesic effect and can enhance the pain relieving effects of opioids.

FDA-commissioned studies from 2011 indicate that in children, young adults, and adults there is no association between serious adverse cardiovascular events (sudden death, heart attack, and stroke) and the medical use of amphetamine or other ADHD stimulants. These findings were subsequently corroborated by a 2022 meta-analysis that sampled nearly four million participants, which found no association between therapeutic use of amphetamine and the development of cardiovascular disease in any age group. However, amphetamine pharmaceuticals are contraindicated in individuals with preexisting cardiovascular disease.

=== Psychological ===
At normal therapeutic doses, the most common psychological side effects of amphetamine include increased alertness, apprehension, concentration, initiative, self-confidence and sociability, mood swings (elated mood followed by mildly depressed mood), insomnia or wakefulness, and decreased sense of fatigue. Less common side effects include anxiety, change in libido, grandiosity, irritability, repetitive or obsessive behaviors, and restlessness; these effects depend on the user's personality and current mental state. Amphetamine psychosis (e.g., delusions and paranoia) can occur in heavy users. Although very rare, this psychosis can also occur at therapeutic doses during long-term therapy. According to the FDA, "there is no systematic evidence" that stimulants produce aggressive behavior or hostility.

Amphetamine has also been shown to produce a conditioned place preference in humans taking therapeutic doses, meaning that individuals acquire a preference for spending time in places where they have previously used amphetamine.

=== Reinforcement disorders ===
==== Addiction ====
Addiction and dependence glossary
- addiction – a neuropsychological disorder characterized by a persistent and intense urge to use a drug or engage in a behavior that produces natural reward; addictive drug – psychoactive substances that with repeated use are associated with significantly higher rates of substance use disorders, due in large part to the drug's effect on brain reward systems; dependence – an adaptive state associated with a withdrawal syndrome upon cessation of repeated exposure to a stimulus (e.g., drug intake); drug sensitization or reverse tolerance – the escalating effect of a drug resulting from repeated administration at a given dose; drug withdrawal – symptoms that occur upon cessation of repeated drug use; physical dependence – dependence that involves persistent physical–somatic withdrawal symptoms (e.g., delirium tremens and nausea); psychological dependence – dependence that is characterized by emotional-motivational withdrawal symptoms (e.g., anhedonia and anxiety) that affect cognitive functioning.; reinforcing stimuli – stimuli that increase the probability of repeating behaviors paired with them; rewarding stimuli – stimuli that the brain interprets as intrinsically positive and desirable or as something to approach; sensitization – an amplified response to a stimulus resulting from repeated exposure to it; substance use disorder – a condition in which the use of substances leads to clinically and functionally significant impairment or distress; drug tolerance – the diminishing effect of a drug resulting from repeated administration at a given dose

Transcription factor glossary
- gene expression – the process by which information from a gene is used in the synthesis of a functional gene product such as a protein; transcription – the process of making messenger RNA (mRNA) from a DNA template by RNA polymerase; transcription factor – a protein that binds to DNA and regulates gene expression by promoting or suppressing transcription; transcriptional regulation – controlling the rate of gene transcription for example by helping or hindering RNA polymerase binding to DNA; upregulation, activation, or promotion – increase the rate of gene transcription; downregulation, repression, or suppression – decrease the rate of gene transcription; coactivator – a protein (or a small molecule) that works with transcription factors to increase the rate of gene transcription; corepressor – a protein (or a small molecule) that works with transcription factors to decrease the rate of gene transcription; response element – a specific sequence of DNA that a transcription factor binds to

Signaling cascade in the nucleus accumbens that results in amphetamine addiction
This diagram depicts the signaling events in the brain's reward center that are induced by chronic high-dose exposure to psychostimulants that increase the concentration of synaptic dopamine, like amphetamine, methamphetamine, and phenethylamine. Following presynaptic dopamine and glutamate co-release by such psychostimulants, postsynaptic receptors for these neurotransmitters trigger internal signaling events through a cAMP-dependent pathway and a calcium-dependent pathway that ultimately result in increased CREB phosphorylation. Phosphorylated CREB increases levels of ΔFosB, which in turn represses the c-Fos gene with the help of corepressors; c-Fos repression acts as a molecular switch that enables the accumulation of ΔFosB in the neuron. A highly stable (phosphorylated) form of ΔFosB, one that persists in neurons for 1–2 months, slowly accumulates following repeated high-dose exposure to stimulants through this process. ΔFosB functions as "one of the master control proteins" that produces addiction-related structural changes in the brain, and upon sufficient accumulation, with the help of its downstream targets (e.g., nuclear factor kappa B), it induces an addictive state.

Addiction is a serious risk with heavy recreational amphetamine use, but is unlikely to occur from long-term medical use at therapeutic doses; in fact, lifetime stimulant therapy for ADHD that begins during childhood reduces the risk of developing substance use disorders as an adult. Pathological overactivation of the mesolimbic pathway, a dopamine pathway that connects the ventral tegmental area to the nucleus accumbens, plays a central role in amphetamine addiction. Individuals who frequently self-administer high doses of amphetamine have a high risk of developing an amphetamine addiction, since chronic use at high doses gradually increases the level of accumbal ΔFosB, a "molecular switch" and "master control protein" for addiction. Once nucleus accumbens ΔFosB is sufficiently overexpressed, it begins to increase the severity of addictive behavior (i.e., compulsive drug-seeking) with further increases in its expression. While there are currently no effective drugs for treating amphetamine addiction, regularly engaging in sustained aerobic exercise appears to reduce the risk of developing such an addiction. Exercise therapy improves clinical treatment outcomes and may be used as an adjunct therapy with behavioral therapies for addiction.

==== Biomolecular mechanisms ====
Chronic use of amphetamine at excessive doses causes alterations in gene expression in the mesocorticolimbic projection, which arise through transcriptional and epigenetic mechanisms. The most important transcription factors (Note: Transcription factors are proteins that increase or decrease the expression of specific genes.) that produce these alterations are Delta FBJ murine osteosarcoma viral oncogene homolog B (ΔFosB), cAMP response element binding protein (CREB), and nuclear factor-kappa B (NF-κB). ΔFosB is the most significant biomolecular mechanism in addiction because ΔFosB overexpression (i.e., an abnormally high level of gene expression which produces a pronounced gene-related phenotype) in the D1-type medium spiny neurons in the nucleus accumbens is necessary and sufficient (Note: In simpler terms, this necessary and sufficient relationship means that ΔFosB overexpression in the nucleus accumbens and addiction-related behavioral and neural adaptations always occur together and never occur alone.) for many of the neural adaptations and regulates multiple behavioral effects (e.g., reward sensitization and escalating drug self-administration) involved in addiction. Once ΔFosB is sufficiently overexpressed, it induces an addictive state that becomes increasingly more severe with further increases in ΔFosB expression. It has been implicated in addictions to alcohol, cannabinoids, cocaine, methylphenidate, nicotine, opioids, phencyclidine, propofol, and substituted amphetamines, among others.

ΔJunD, a transcription factor, and G9a, a histone methyltransferase enzyme, both oppose the function of ΔFosB and inhibit increases in its expression. Sufficiently overexpressing ΔJunD in the nucleus accumbens with viral vectors can completely block many of the neural and behavioral alterations seen in chronic drug abuse (i.e., the alterations mediated by ΔFosB). Similarly, accumbal G9a hyperexpression results in markedly increased histone 3 lysine residue 9 dimethylation (H3K9me2) and blocks the induction of ΔFosB-mediated neural and behavioral plasticity by chronic drug use, which occurs via H3K9me2-mediated repression of transcription factors for ΔFosB and H3K9me2-mediated repression of various ΔFosB transcriptional targets (e.g., CDK5). ΔFosB also plays an important role in regulating behavioral responses to natural rewards, such as palatable food, sex, and exercise. Since both natural rewards and addictive drugs induce the expression of ΔFosB (i.e., they cause the brain to produce more of it), chronic acquisition of these rewards can result in a similar pathological state of addiction. Consequently, ΔFosB is the most significant factor involved in both amphetamine addiction and amphetamine-induced sexual addictions, which are compulsive sexual behaviors that result from excessive sexual activity and amphetamine use. These sexual addictions are associated with a dopamine dysregulation syndrome which occurs in some patients taking dopaminergic drugs.

The effects of amphetamine on gene regulation are both dose- and route-dependent. Most of the research on gene regulation and addiction is based upon animal studies with intravenous amphetamine administration at very high doses. The few studies that have used equivalent (weight-adjusted) human therapeutic doses and oral administration show that these changes, if they occur, are relatively minor. This suggests that medical use of amphetamine does not significantly affect gene regulation.

===== Pharmacological treatments =====
As of December 2019, there is no effective pharmacotherapy for amphetamine addiction. Reviews from 2015 and 2016 indicated that TAAR1-selective agonists have significant therapeutic potential as a treatment for psychostimulant addictions; however, as of February 2016, the only compounds which are known to function as TAAR1-selective agonists are experimental drugs. Amphetamine addiction is largely mediated through increased activation of dopamine receptors and co-localized NMDA receptors (Note: NMDA receptors are voltage-dependent ligand-gated ion channels that requires simultaneous binding of glutamate and a co-agonist (D-serine or glycine) to open the ion channel.) in the nucleus accumbens; magnesium ions inhibit NMDA receptors by blocking the receptor calcium channel. One review suggested that, based upon animal testing, pathological (addiction-inducing) psychostimulant use significantly reduces the level of intracellular magnesium throughout the brain. Supplemental magnesium (Note: The review indicated that magnesium L-aspartate and magnesium chloride produce significant changes in addictive behavior; other forms of magnesium were not mentioned.) treatment has been shown to reduce amphetamine self-administration (i.e., doses given to oneself) in humans, but it is not an effective monotherapy for amphetamine addiction.

A systematic review and meta-analysis from 2019 assessed the efficacy of 17 different pharmacotherapies used in randomized controlled trials (RCTs) for amphetamine and methamphetamine addiction; it found only low-strength evidence that methylphenidate might reduce amphetamine or methamphetamine self-administration. There was low- to moderate-strength evidence of no benefit for most of the other medications used in RCTs, which included antidepressants (bupropion, mirtazapine, sertraline), antipsychotics (aripiprazole), anticonvulsants (topiramate, baclofen, gabapentin), naltrexone, varenicline, citicoline, ondansetron, prometa, riluzole, atomoxetine, dextroamphetamine, and modafinil.

===== Behavioral treatments =====
A 2018 systematic review and network meta-analysis of 50 trials involving 12 different psychosocial interventions for amphetamine, methamphetamine, or cocaine addiction found that combination therapy with both contingency management and community reinforcement approach had the highest efficacy (i.e., abstinence rate) and acceptability (i.e., lowest dropout rate). Other treatment modalities examined in the analysis included monotherapy with contingency management or community reinforcement approach, cognitive behavioral therapy, 12-step programs, non-contingent reward-based therapies, psychodynamic therapy, and other combination therapies involving these.

Additionally, research on the neurobiological effects of physical exercise suggests that daily aerobic exercise, especially endurance exercise (e.g., marathon running), prevents the development of drug addiction and is an effective adjunct therapy (i.e., a supplemental treatment) for amphetamine addiction. Exercise leads to better treatment outcomes when used as an adjunct treatment, particularly for psychostimulant addictions. In particular, aerobic exercise decreases psychostimulant self-administration, reduces the reinstatement (i.e., relapse) of drug-seeking, and induces increased dopamine receptor D_{2} (DRD2) density in the striatum. This is the opposite of pathological stimulant use, which induces decreased striatal DRD2 density. One review noted that exercise may also prevent the development of a drug addiction by altering ΔFosB or c-Fos immunoreactivity in the striatum or other parts of the reward system.

Summary of addiction-related plasticity
Form of neuroplasticity or behavioral plasticity	Type of reinforcer						Ref.
Form of neuroplasticity or behavioral plasticity	Opiates	Psychostimulants	High fat or sugar food	Sexual intercourse	Physical exercise (aerobic)	Environmental enrichment	Ref.
ΔFosB expression in nucleus accumbens D1-type MSNs	↑	↑	↑	↑	↑	↑	
Behavioral plasticity
Escalation of intake	Yes	Yes	Yes				
Psychostimulant cross-sensitization	Yes	Not applicable	Yes	Yes	Attenuated	Attenuated	
Psychostimulant self-administration	↑	↑	↓		↓	↓	
Psychostimulant conditioned place preference	↑	↑	↓	↑	↓	↑	
Reinstatement of drug-seeking behavior	↑	↑			↓	↓	
Neurochemical plasticity
CREB phosphorylation in the nucleus accumbens	↓	↓	↓		↓	↓	
Sensitized dopamine response in the nucleus accumbens	No	Yes	No	Yes			
Altered striatal dopamine signaling	↓DRD2, ↑DRD3	↑DRD1, ↓DRD2, ↑DRD3	↑DRD1, ↓DRD2, ↑DRD3		↑DRD2	↑DRD2	
Altered striatal opioid signaling	No change or ↑μ-opioid receptors	↑μ-opioid receptors ↑κ-opioid receptors	↑μ-opioid receptors	↑μ-opioid receptors	No change	No change	
Changes in striatal opioid peptides	↑dynorphin No change: enkephalin	↑dynorphin	↓enkephalin		↑dynorphin	↑dynorphin	
Mesocorticolimbic synaptic plasticity
Number of dendrites in the nucleus accumbens	↓	↑		↑			
Dendritic spine density in the nucleus accumbens	↓	↑		↑			

==== Dependence and withdrawal ====
Drug tolerance develops rapidly in amphetamine abuse (i.e., recreational amphetamine use), so periods of extended abuse require increasingly larger doses of the drug in order to achieve the same effect. According to a Cochrane review on withdrawal in individuals who compulsively use amphetamine and methamphetamine, "when chronic heavy users abruptly discontinue amphetamine use, many report a time-limited withdrawal syndrome that occurs within 24 hours of their last dose." This review noted that withdrawal symptoms in chronic, high-dose users are frequent, occurring in roughly 88% of cases, and persist for 3–4 weeks with a marked "crash" phase occurring during the first week. Amphetamine withdrawal symptoms can include anxiety, drug craving, depressed mood, fatigue, increased appetite, increased movement or decreased movement, lack of motivation, sleeplessness or sleepiness, and lucid dreams. The review indicated that the severity of withdrawal symptoms is positively correlated with the age of the individual and the extent of their dependence.

According to a 2025 review, the discontinuation of amphetamine at therapeutic doses does not typically result in withdrawal symptoms. Discontinuation of amphetamine may cause a recurrence of ADHD symptoms due to the cessation of treatment-related drug effects. In cases where mild withdrawal symptoms do occur, they can be avoided by tapering the dose. Unlike amphetamine abuse, where drug tolerance necessitates escalating doses to achieve the same effect, tolerance to clinically relevant doses of amphetamine plateaus after the initial titration period, and "drug holidays" (i.e., temporary treatment discontinuation) are not required to prevent the development of tolerance. A 2026 systematic review on ADHD medication tolerance found evidence of tolerance developing to some affective state effects of amphetamine (e.g., positive mood and drug liking) within two weeks of daily use, but little to no evidence of long-term tolerance to its therapeutic or cardiovascular effects.

== Overdose ==
An amphetamine overdose can lead to many different symptoms, but is rarely fatal with appropriate care. The severity of overdose symptoms increases with dosage and decreases with drug tolerance to amphetamine. Tolerant individuals have been known to take as much as 5 grams of amphetamine in a day, which is roughly 100 times the maximum daily therapeutic dose. Symptoms of a moderate and extremely large overdose are listed below; fatal amphetamine poisoning usually also involves convulsions and coma. In 2013, overdose on amphetamine, methamphetamine, and other compounds implicated in an "amphetamine use disorder" resulted in an estimated 3,788 deaths worldwide (3,425–4,145 deaths, 95% confidence). (Note: The 95% confidence interval indicates that there is a 95% probability that the true number of deaths lies between 3,425 and 4,145.)

Overdose symptoms by system
System	Minor or moderate overdose	Severe overdose
Cardiovascular	Abnormal heartbeat; High or low blood pressure	Cardiogenic shock (heart not pumping enough blood); Cerebral hemorrhage (bleeding in the brain); Circulatory collapse (partial or complete failure of the circulatory system)
Central nervous system	Confusion; Abnormally fast reflexes; Severe agitation; Tremor (involuntary muscle twitching)	Acute amphetamine psychosis (e.g., delusions and paranoia); Compulsive and repetitive movement; Serotonin syndrome (excessive serotonergic nerve activity); Sympathomimetic toxidrome (excessive adrenergic nerve activity)
Musculoskeletal	Muscle pain	Rhabdomyolysis (rapid muscle breakdown)
Respiratory	Rapid breathing	Pulmonary edema (fluid accumulation in the lungs); Pulmonary hypertension (high blood pressure in the arteries of the lung); Respiratory alkalosis (reduced blood CO_{2})
Urinary	Painful urination; Urinary retention (inability to urinate)	No urine production; Kidney failure
Other	Elevated body temperature; Mydriasis (dilated pupils)	Elevated or low blood potassium; Hyperpyrexia (extremely elevated core body temperature); Metabolic acidosis (excessively acidic bodily fluids)

=== Toxicity ===
In rodents and primates, sufficiently high doses of amphetamine cause dopaminergic neurotoxicity, or damage to dopamine neurons, which is characterized by dopamine terminal degeneration and reduced transporter and receptor function. There is no evidence that amphetamine is directly neurotoxic in humans. However, large doses of amphetamine may indirectly cause dopaminergic neurotoxicity as a result of hyperpyrexia, the excessive formation of reactive oxygen species, and increased autoxidation of dopamine. Animal models of neurotoxicity from high-dose amphetamine exposure indicate that the occurrence of hyperpyrexia (i.e., core body temperature ≥ 40 °C) is necessary for the development of amphetamine-induced neurotoxicity. Prolonged elevations of brain temperature above 40 °C likely promote the development of amphetamine-induced neurotoxicity in laboratory animals by facilitating the production of reactive oxygen species, disrupting cellular protein function, and transiently increasing blood–brain barrier permeability.

=== Psychosis ===
An amphetamine overdose can result in a stimulant psychosis that may involve a variety of symptoms, such as delusions and paranoia. A Cochrane review on treatment for amphetamine, dextroamphetamine, and methamphetamine psychosis states that about 5–15% of users fail to recover completely. According to the same review, there is at least one trial that shows antipsychotic medications effectively resolve the symptoms of acute amphetamine psychosis. Psychosis rarely arises from therapeutic use.

== Interactions ==
Many types of substances are known to interact with amphetamine, resulting in altered drug action or metabolism of amphetamine, the interacting substance, or both. Inhibitors of the enzymes that metabolize amphetamine (e.g., CYP2D6 and FMO3) will prolong its elimination half-life, meaning that its effects will last longer. Amphetamine also interacts with MAOIs, particularly monoamine oxidase A inhibitors, since both MAOIs and amphetamine increase plasma catecholamines (i.e., norepinephrine and dopamine); therefore, concurrent use of both is dangerous. Amphetamine modulates the activity of most psychoactive drugs. In particular, amphetamine may decrease the effects of sedatives and depressants and increase the effects of stimulants and antidepressants. Amphetamine may also decrease the effects of antihypertensives and antipsychotics due to its effects on blood pressure and dopamine respectively. Zinc supplementation may reduce the minimum effective dose of amphetamine when it is used for the treatment of ADHD. (Note: The human dopamine transporter contains a high affinity extracellular zinc binding site which, upon zinc binding, inhibits dopamine reuptake and amplifies amphetamine-induced dopamine efflux in vitro. The human serotonin transporter and norepinephrine transporter do not contain zinc binding sites.) Norepinephrine reuptake inhibitors (NRIs) like atomoxetine prevent norepinephrine release induced by amphetamines and have been found to reduce the stimulant, euphoriant, and sympathomimetic effects of dextroamphetamine in humans.

== Pharmacology ==
=== Pharmacodynamics ===
Monoamine release of amphetamine and related agents (EC_{50}, nM)
Compound	NE	DA	5-HT	Ref
Phenethylamine	10.9	39.5	>10,000	
Dextroamphetamine	6.6–7.2	5.8–24.8	698–1,765	
Levoamphetamine	9.5	27.7	ND	
Dextromethamphetamine	12.3–13.8	8.5–24.5	736–1,292	
Levomethamphetamine	28.5	416	4,640	
Notes: The smaller the value, the more strongly the drug releases the neurotransmitter. See also Monoamine releasing agent § Activity profiles for a larger table with more compounds. Refs:

Pharmacodynamics of amphetamine in a dopamine neuron
Amphetamine enters the presynaptic neuron across the neuronal membrane or through DAT. Once inside, it binds to TAAR1 or enters synaptic vesicles through VMAT2. When amphetamine enters synaptic vesicles through VMAT2, it collapses the vesicular pH gradient, which in turn causes dopamine to be released into the cytosol (light tan-colored area) through VMAT2. When amphetamine binds to TAAR1, it reduces the firing rate of the dopamine neuron via G protein-coupled inwardly rectifying potassium channels (GIRKs) and activates protein kinase A (PKA) and protein kinase C (PKC), which subsequently phosphorylate DAT. PKA phosphorylation causes DAT to withdraw into the presynaptic neuron (internalize) and cease transport. PKC-phosphorylated DAT may either operate in reverse or, like PKA-phosphorylated DAT, internalize and cease transport. Amphetamine is also known to increase intracellular calcium, an effect which is associated with DAT phosphorylation through a CAMKIIα-dependent pathway, in turn producing dopamine efflux.

Amphetamine and its enantiomers have been identified as potent full agonists of trace amine-associated receptor 1 (TAAR1), a GPCR, discovered in 2001, that is important for regulation of monoaminergic systems in the brain. Activation of TAAR1 increases cAMP production via adenylyl cyclase activation and inhibits the function of the dopamine transporter, norepinephrine transporter, and serotonin transporter, as well as inducing the release of these monoamine neurotransmitters (effluxion). Amphetamine enantiomers are also substrates for a specific neuronal synaptic vesicle uptake transporter called VMAT2. When amphetamine is taken up by VMAT2, the vesicle releases (effluxes) dopamine, norepinephrine, and serotonin, among other monoamines, into the cytosol in exchange.

Dextroamphetamine (the dextrorotary enantiomer) and levoamphetamine (the levorotary enantiomer) have identical pharmacodynamics, but their binding affinities to their biomolecular targets vary. Dextroamphetamine is a more potent agonist of TAAR1 than levoamphetamine. Consequently, dextroamphetamine produces roughly three to four times more central nervous system (CNS) stimulation than levoamphetamine; however, levoamphetamine has slightly greater cardiovascular and peripheral effects.

=== Related endogenous compounds ===
Amphetamine has a very similar structure and function to the endogenous trace amines, which are naturally occurring neuromodulator molecules produced in the human body and brain. Among this group, the most closely related compounds are phenethylamine, the parent compound of amphetamine, and N-methylphenethylamine, a structural isomer of amphetamine (i.e., it has an identical molecular formula). In humans, phenethylamine is produced directly from L-phenylalanine by the aromatic amino acid decarboxylase (AADC) enzyme, which converts L-DOPA into dopamine as well. In turn, N-methylphenethylamine is metabolized from phenethylamine by phenylethanolamine N-methyltransferase, the same enzyme that metabolizes norepinephrine into epinephrine. Like amphetamine, both phenethylamine and N-methylphenethylamine regulate monoamine neurotransmission via TAAR1; unlike amphetamine, both of these substances are broken down by monoamine oxidase B, and therefore have a shorter half-life than amphetamine.

=== Pharmacokinetics ===
The oral bioavailability of amphetamine varies with gastrointestinal pH; it is well absorbed from the gut, and bioavailability is typically 90%. Amphetamine is a weak base with a pK_{a} of 9.9; consequently, when the pH is basic, more of the drug is in its lipid soluble free base form, and more is absorbed through the lipid-rich cell membranes of the gut epithelium. Conversely, an acidic pH means the drug is predominantly in a water-soluble cationic (salt) form, and less is absorbed. Between 16-20% of amphetamine circulating in the bloodstream is bound to plasma proteins. Following absorption, amphetamine readily distributes into most tissues in the body, with high concentrations occurring in cerebrospinal fluid and brain tissue.

The half-lives of amphetamine enantiomers differ and vary with urine pH. At normal urine pH, the half-lives of dextroamphetamine and levoamphetamine are 9–11 hours and 11–14 hours, respectively. Highly acidic urine will reduce the enantiomer half-lives to 7 hours; highly alkaline urine will increase the half-lives up to 34 hours. The immediate-release and extended release variants of salts of both isomers reach peak plasma concentrations at 3 hours and 7 hours post-dose respectively. Amphetamine is eliminated via the kidneys, with 30–40% of the drug being excreted unchanged at normal urinary pH. When the urinary pH is basic, amphetamine is in its free base form, so less is excreted. When urine pH is abnormal, the urinary recovery of amphetamine may range from a low of 1% to a high of 75%, depending mostly upon whether urine is too basic or acidic, respectively. Following oral administration, amphetamine appears in urine within 3 hours. Roughly 90% of ingested amphetamine is eliminated 3 days after the last oral dose.

CYP2D6, dopamine β-hydroxylase (DBH), flavin-containing monooxygenase 3 (FMO3), butyrate-CoA ligase (XM-ligase), and glycine N-acyltransferase (GLYAT) are the enzymes known to metabolize amphetamine or its metabolites in humans. Amphetamine has a variety of excreted metabolic products, including 4-hydroxyamphetamine, 4-hydroxynorephedrine, 4-hydroxyphenylacetone, N-hydroxyamphetamine, benzoic acid, hippuric acid, norephedrine, and phenylacetone. Among these metabolites, the active sympathomimetics are 4-hydroxyamphetamine, 4-hydroxynorephedrine, norephedrine, and N-hydroxyamphetamine. The main metabolic pathways involve aromatic para-hydroxylation, aliphatic alpha- and beta-hydroxylation, N-oxidation, N-dealkylation, and deamination. The known metabolic pathways, detectable metabolites, and metabolizing enzymes in humans include the following:

Metabolic pathways of amphetamine in humans
The primary active metabolites of amphetamine are 4-hydroxyamphetamine and norephedrine; at normal urine pH, about 30–40% of amphetamine is excreted unchanged and roughly 50% is excreted as the inactive metabolites (bottom row). The remaining 10–20% is excreted as the active metabolites. Benzoic acid is metabolized by XM-ligase into an intermediate product, benzoyl-CoA, which is then metabolized by GLYAT into hippuric acid.

== History, society, and culture ==
Racemic amphetamine was first synthesized under the chemical name "phenylisopropylamine" in Berlin, 1887 by the Romanian chemist Lazăr Edeleanu. It was not widely marketed until 1932, when the pharmaceutical company Smith, Kline & French (now known as GlaxoSmithKline) introduced it in the form of the Benzedrine inhaler for use as a bronchodilator. Notably, the amphetamine contained in the Benzedrine inhaler was the liquid free-base, (Note: Free-base form amphetamine is a volatile oil, hence the efficacy of the inhalers.) not a chloride or sulfate salt.

In 1935, the medical community became aware of the stimulant properties of amphetamine, specifically the dextroamphetamine isomer, and in 1937 Smith, Kline, and French introduced tablets under the brand name Dexedrine. In the United States, Dexedrine was approved to treat narcolepsy and attention deficit hyperactivity disorder (ADHD). In Canada indications once included epilepsy and parkinsonism. Dextroamphetamine was marketed in various other forms in the following decades, primarily by Smith, Kline, and French, such as several combination medications including a mixture of dextroamphetamine and amobarbital (a barbiturate) sold under the brand name Dexamyl and, in the 1950s, an extended release capsule (the "Spansule"). Preparations containing dextroamphetamine were also used in World War II as a treatment against fatigue.

It quickly became apparent that dextroamphetamine and other amphetamines had a high potential for misuse, although they were not heavily controlled until 1970, when the Comprehensive Drug Abuse Prevention and Control Act was passed by the United States Congress. Dextroamphetamine, along with other sympathomimetics, was eventually classified as Schedule II, the most restrictive category possible for a drug with a government-sanctioned, recognized medical use. Internationally, it has been available under the names AmfeDyn (Italy), Curban (US), Obetrol (Switzerland), Simpamina (Italy), Dexedrine/GSK (US & Canada), Dexedrine/UCB (United Kingdom), Dextropa (Portugal), and Stild (Spain). It became popular on the mod scene in England in the early 1960s, and carried through to the Northern Soul scene in the north of England to the end of the 1970s.

In October 2010, GlaxoSmithKline sold the rights for Dexedrine Spansule to Amedra Pharmaceuticals (a subsidiary of CorePharma).

The U.S. Air Force uses dextroamphetamine as one of its "go pills", given to pilots on long missions to help them remain focused and alert. Conversely, "no-go pills" are used after the mission is completed, to combat the effects of the mission and "go-pills". The Tarnak Farm incident was linked by media reports to the use of this drug on long term fatigued pilots. The military did not accept this explanation, citing the lack of similar incidents. Newer stimulant medications or awakeness promoting agents with different side effect profiles, such as modafinil, are being investigated and sometimes issued for this reason.

=== Formulations ===
Dextroamphetamine pharmaceuticals and prodrugs (Note: These represent the current brands in the United States, except Dexedrine instant release tablets. Dexedrine tablets, introduced in 1937, is discontinued but available as Zenzedi and generically; Dexedrine listed here represents the extended release "Spansule" capsule which was approved in 1976. Amphetamine sulfate tablets, now sold as Evekeo (brand), were originally sold as Benzedrine (brand) sulfate in 1935 and discontinued sometime after 1982.)
Brand name	United States Adopted Name	(D:L) ratio	Dosage form	Marketing start date	Sources
Adderall	Mixed amphetamine salts	3:1 (salts)	tablet	1996	
Adderall XR	Mixed amphetamine salts	3:1 (salts)	capsule	2001	
Mydayis	Mixed amphetamine salts	3:1 (salts)	capsule	2017	
Adzenys XR-ODT	amphetamine	3:1 (base)	ODT	2016	
Dyanavel XR	amphetamine	3.2:1 (base)	suspension	2015	
Evekeo	amphetamine sulfate	1:1 (salts)	tablet	2012	
Dexedrine	dextroamphetamine sulfate	1:0 (salts)	capsule	1976	
Zenzedi	dextroamphetamine sulfate	1:0 (salts)	tablet	2013	
Vyvanse	lisdexamfetamine dimesylate	1:0 (prodrug)	capsule	2007	
Vyvanse	lisdexamfetamine dimesylate	1:0 (prodrug)	tablet	2007	
Xelstrym	dextroamphetamine	1:0 (base)	patch	2022	

==== Transdermal dextroamphetamine patches ====
Dextroamphetamine is available as a transdermal patch containing dextroamphetamine base under the brand name Xelstrym.

==== Dextroamphetamine sulfate ====
In the United States, immediate release (IR) formulations of dextroamphetamine sulfate are available generically as 5 mg and 10 mg tablets, marketed by Barr (Teva Pharmaceutical Industries), Mallinckrodt Pharmaceuticals, Wilshire Pharmaceuticals, Aurobindo Pharmaceutical USA and CorePharma. Previous IR tablets sold under the brand names Dexedrine and Dextrostat have been discontinued but in 2015, IR tablets became available by the brand name Zenzedi, offered as 2.5 mg, 5 mg, 7.5 mg, 10 mg, 15 mg, 20 mg and 30 mg tablets. Dextroamphetamine sulfate is also available as a controlled-release (CR) capsule preparation in strengths of 5 mg, 10 mg, and 15 mg under the brand name Dexedrine Spansule, with generic versions marketed by Barr and Mallinckrodt. A bubblegum flavored oral solution is available under the brand name ProCentra, manufactured by FSC Pediatrics, which is designed to be an easier method of administration in children who have difficulty swallowing tablets, each 5 mL contains 5 mg dextroamphetamine. The conversion rate between dextroamphetamine sulfate to amphetamine free base is .728.

In Australia, dexamfetamine is available in bottles of 100 instant release 5 mg tablets as a generic drug or slow release dextroamphetamine preparations may be compounded by individual chemists. In the United Kingdom, it is available in 5 mg instant release sulfate tablets under the generic name dexamfetamine sulfate as well as 10 mg and 20 mg strength tablets under the brand name Amfexa. It is also available in generic dexamfetamine sulfate 5 mg/ml oral sugar-free syrup. The brand name Dexedrine was available in the United Kingdom prior to UCB Pharma disinvesting the product to another pharmaceutical company, Auden Mckenzie.

==== Lisdexamfetamine ====
Dextroamphetamine is the active metabolite of the prodrug lisdexamfetamine (L-lysine-dextroamphetamine), available by the brand name Vyvanse (Elvanse in the European market and Venvanse in the Brazilian market). Dextroamphetamine is liberated from lisdexamfetamine enzymatically following contact with red blood cells. The conversion is rate-limited by the enzyme, which prevents high blood concentrations of dextroamphetamine and reduces lisdexamfetamine's drug liking and abuse potential at clinical doses. Vyvanse is marketed as once-a-day dosing as it provides a slow release of dextroamphetamine into the body. Vyvanse is available as capsules, and chewable tablets, and in seven strengths; 10 mg, 20 mg, 30 mg, 40 mg, 50 mg, 60 mg, and 70 mg. The conversion rate between lisdexamfetamine dimesylate (Vyvanse) to dextroamphetamine base is 29.5%.

==== Adderall ====
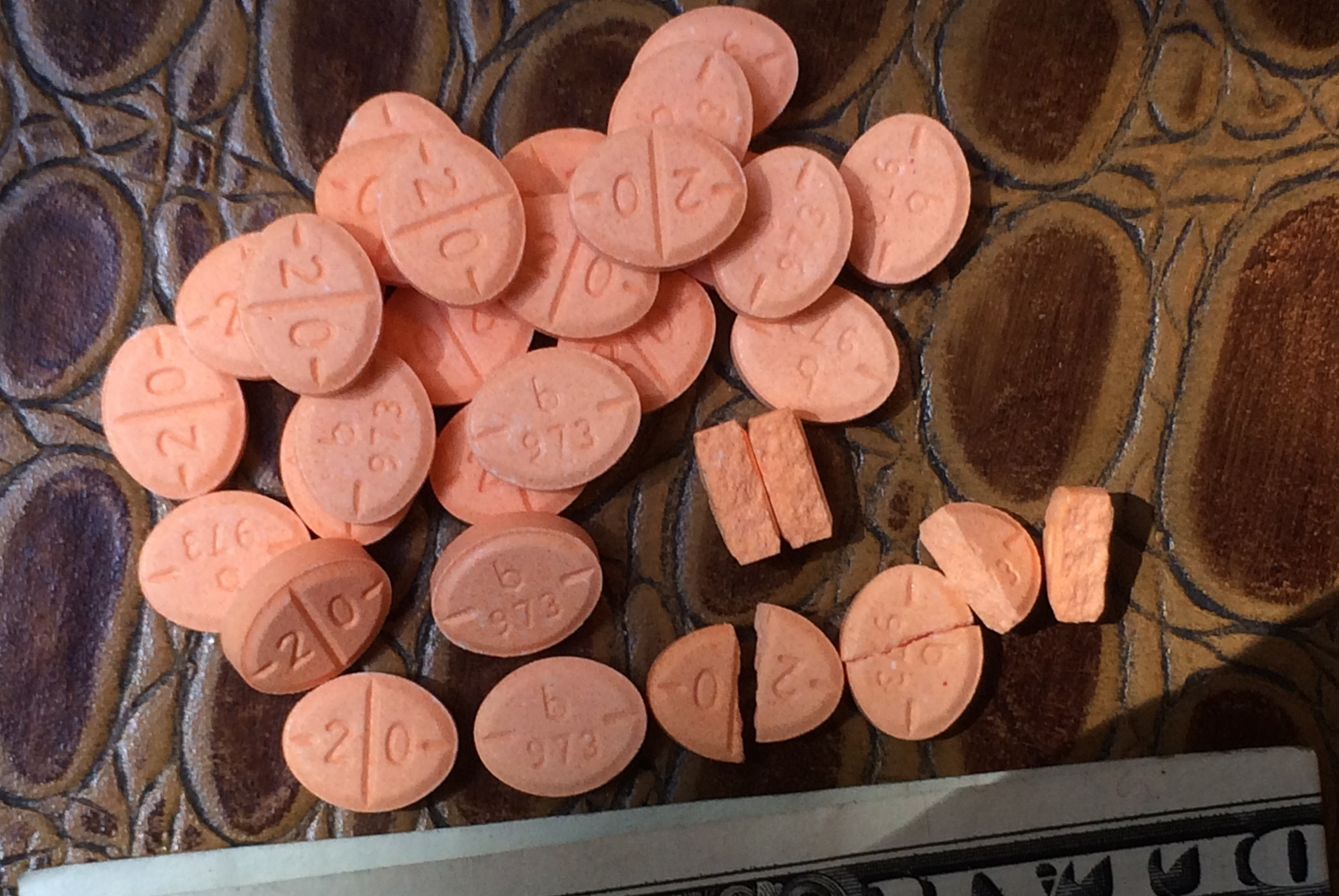
Adderall 20 mg tablets, some broken in half, with a lengthwise-folded US dollar bill along the bottom

Another pharmaceutical that contains dextroamphetamine is commonly known by the brand name Adderall. It is available as immediate release (IR) tablets and extended release (XR) capsules. Adderall contains equal amounts of four amphetamine salts:

- One-quarter racemic (d,l-)amphetamine aspartate monohydrate
- One-quarter dextroamphetamine saccharate
- One-quarter dextroamphetamine sulfate
- One-quarter racemic (d,l-)amphetamine sulfate

Adderall has a total amphetamine base equivalence of 63%. While the enantiomer ratio by dextroamphetamine salts to levoamphetamine salts is 3:1, the amphetamine base content is 75.9% dextroamphetamine, 24.1% levoamphetamine. (Note: Calculated by dextroamphetamine base percent / total amphetamine base percent = 47.49/62.57 = 75.90% from table: Amphetamine base in marketed amphetamine medications. The remainder is levoamphetamine.)

Amphetamine base in marketed amphetamine medications
drug		formula	molar mass (Note: For uniformity, molar masses were calculated using the Lenntech Molecular Weight Calculator and were within 0.01 g/mol of published pharmaceutical values.)		amphetamine base (Note: Amphetamine base percentage = molecular mass_{base} / molecular mass_{total}. Amphetamine base percentage for Adderall = sum of component percentages / 4.)			amphetamine base in equal doses		doses with equal base content (Note: dose = (1 / amphetamine base percentage) × scaling factor = (molecular mass_{total} / molecular mass_{base}) × scaling factor. The values in this column were scaled to a 30 mg dose of dextroamphetamine sulfate. Due to pharmacological differences between these medications (e.g., differences in the release, absorption, conversion, concentration, differing effects of enantiomers, half-life, etc.), the listed values should not be considered equipotent doses.)
drug		formula	(g/mol)		(percent)			(30 mg dose)		doses with equal base content
drug		formula	total	base	total	dextro-	levo-	dextro-	levo-	doses with equal base content
dextroamphetamine sulfate		(C_{9}H_{13}N)_{2}•H_{2}SO_{4}	368.49	270.41	73.38%	73.38%	—	22.0 mg	—	30.0 mg
amphetamine sulfate		(C_{9}H_{13}N)_{2}•H_{2}SO_{4}	368.49	270.41	73.38%	36.69%	36.69%	11.0 mg	11.0 mg	30.0 mg
Adderall					62.57%	47.49%	15.08%	14.2 mg	4.5 mg	35.2 mg
25%	dextroamphetamine sulfate	(C_{9}H_{13}N)_{2}•H_{2}SO_{4}	368.49	270.41	73.38%	73.38%	—			
25%	amphetamine sulfate	(C_{9}H_{13}N)_{2}•H_{2}SO_{4}	368.49	270.41	73.38%	36.69%	36.69%			
25%	dextroamphetamine saccharate	(C_{9}H_{13}N)_{2}•C_{6}H_{10}O_{8}	480.55	270.41	56.27%	56.27%	—			
25%	amphetamine aspartate monohydrate	(C_{9}H_{13}N)•C_{4}H_{7}NO_{4}•H_{2}O	286.32	135.21	47.22%	23.61%	23.61%			
lisdexamfetamine dimesylate		C_{15}H_{25}N_{3}O•(CH_{4}O_{3}S)_{2}	455.49	135.21	29.68%	29.68%	—	8.9 mg	—	74.2 mg
amphetamine base suspension		C_{9}H_{13}N	135.21	135.21	100%	76.19%	23.81%	22.9 mg	7.1 mg	22.0 mg

== Research ==
=== Schizophrenia ===
Dextroamphetamine reduces the negative symptoms of schizophrenia, and has been shown to enhance the effects of auditory discrimination training in schizophrenic patients.

== Notes ==
Image legend
