= Cannabis in Bangladesh =

- Location of Bangladesh (dark green)
- Medicinal: Illegal
- Recreational: Illegal

The cultivation, transport, sale, purchase, and possession of all forms of cannabis has been illegal in Bangladesh since the late 1989, but enforcement efforts are lax and the drug continues to be popular there. Since May 2019, some have claimed that Bangladesh’s government launched a brutal crackdown on the drug trade, which has resulted in the possible extrajudicial killings of over 200 people, and imprisonment of more than 25,000, however cited references do not mention cannabis specifically.

== Prohibition ==
The Bangladesh government, under the Ershad regime, banned the cultivation of cannabis in 1987, and banned its sale in 1989. Ershad had seized power in the 1982 Bangladesh coup d'état, a bloodless coup. The current law governing cannabis in Bangladesh is the Narcotics Control Act 2018. The Act gives the courts discretionary power to impose the death sentence for possession of cannabis over two kilograms.

== Culture ==
Cannabis and opium have been traditionally used by some Bangladeshi people. Today in Dhaka cannabis can be found through local dealers in underground operations evading law enforcement but if caught, the police can be bribed. Every year a festival is held in Kushtia, Bangladesh, in memorial of the late folk singer Fakir Lalon Shah. Many folk gather every year at the festival there are westerners and people from West Bengal, India as well. It can be seen that during the festival period people are singing Bengali folk music and smoking marijuana out of a chillum freely. All these means is to be connected with each other spiritually and remembering the great Lalon Shah through music. During the festival period marijuana consumption is tolerated by authorities.

== Cultivation ==
The 2005 UNODC Bangladesh country profile notes:

Cannabis is still cultivated, particularly in the districts of Naogaon, Rajshahi, Jamalpur and Netrokona in the northwestern region, as well as the hilly districts near Cox’s Bazaar, Bandarban, Khagrachhari and Rangamati in the southeast (bordering Myanmar). Reliable figures for the total area of cannabis production in Bangladesh are not available, but cultivation in the Chittagong Hill Tract region is reportedly on the increase.

== See also ==
- Methamphetamine in Bangladesh
