= Joseph Rose =

Joseph Rose may refer to:

- Joseph Rose (journalist) (born 1969), American journalist and radio personality
- Joseph Rose (plasterer) (1745–1799), English plasterer (stuccoist)
- Joseph Nelson Rose (1862–1928), American botanist

== See also ==
- Joe Rose (disambiguation)
