= Joseph Rose (journalist) =

American Journalist and priest

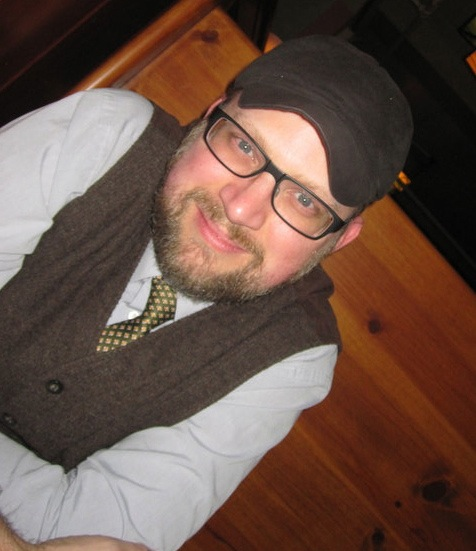
Joseph Rose at a bicycle conference in 2011

Joseph Rose (born May 6, 1969, in Wenatchee, Washington, United States) is an American journalist and Episcopal priest formerly based in Portland, Oregon. He currently lives in Stamford, Connecticut, where he serves as rector of St. Francis Episcopal Church. Rose was on the staff of The Oregonian as a writer, columnist and multimedia producer from 1999 until 2016. He has written about crime, prisons, government, Portland's world-famous bicycle scene, religion, popular culture, music, film, Oregon's methamphetamine epidemic and transportation. He is also a former freelance writer for Wired.com. As of January 2017, he described himself as retired from The Oregonian in order to go into ministry.

In 2004, he was a reporter on the newspaper's Pulitzer-nominated series on the costs of Oregon's methamphetamine epidemic. Rose's "Faces of Meth" story was turned into billboards and posters as well as replicated by other American media outlets, including PBS's Frontline. He was part of the team of reporters that exposed the federal government's trail of errors in the case against Brandon Mayfield, a Portland area attorney who, in the wake of the 9/11 terrorism attacks, was wrongfully arrested for involvement in the 2004 Madrid Train Bombings. He has also written about the childhood and family of Portland-native Matt Groening, creator of The Simpsons.

Rose's articles on a Gulf War veteran secretly living in the wilderness of Portland's Forest Park with his young daughter helped inspire the 2018 film "Leave No Trace."

In 2008, Rose became The Oregonian's chief reporter investigating transportation issues, with multiple investigative stories on TriMet's safety and financial issues, a daily blog and a weekly Metro column.

He is a graduate of Central Washington University in Ellensburg, Washington. Rose graduated from Yale University with a Master of Divinity before being ordained. He has also served as associate rector of St. Luke’s Episcopal Church in Atlanta, Georgia.

When he was living in Oregon, Rose was also a leader of the "alternative liturgy" worship movement in the U.S. Episcopal Church. The movement creates worship services based on the music of popular contemporary musicians such as U2, Radiohead, Woody Guthrie and Bruce Springsteen. A March 2012 story in Willamette Week called Rose "the King of Hymns". In the article, Rose describes the spirit of the events: "We get a lot of folks who come but really aren’t connected to a church. They’re part of the very secular Oregon. But they feel a spiritual connection to popular music." Rose's Substack newsletter, Vinyl Theology, explores the spirituality and the divine in secular music, focusing on his record collection.

In addition to his Pulitzer nomination, Rose's journalism awards include several by the Society of Professional Journalists for investigative reporting and his writing on religion, government, the justice system and culture; one for breaking news in the 2011 C.B. Blethen Awards; and a 2013 National Headliner Award in the category of special or feature column.
