= Methamphetamine =

Central nervous system stimulant

Methamphetamine INN: Metamfetamine
- Skeletal formula of methamphetamine

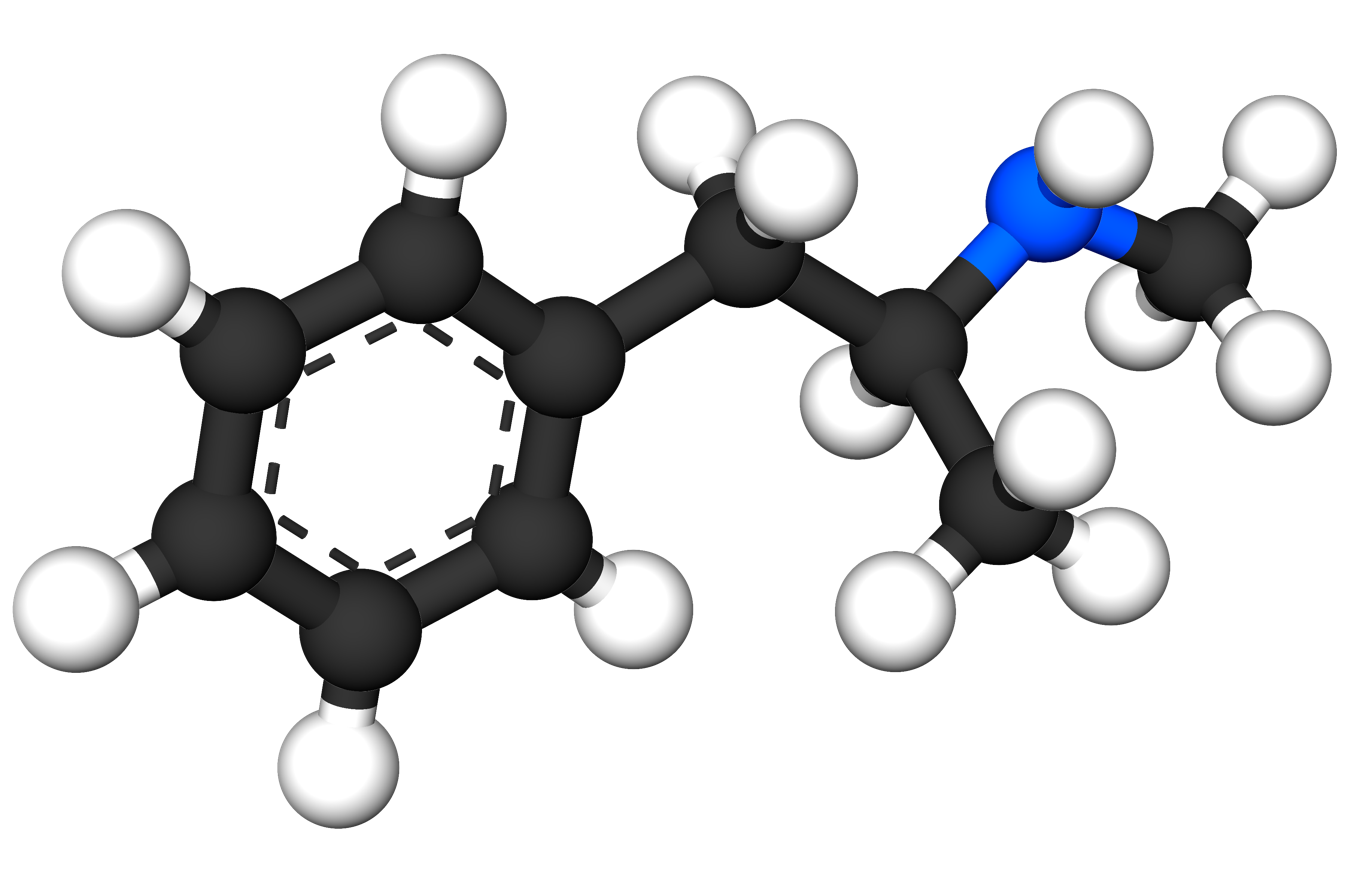

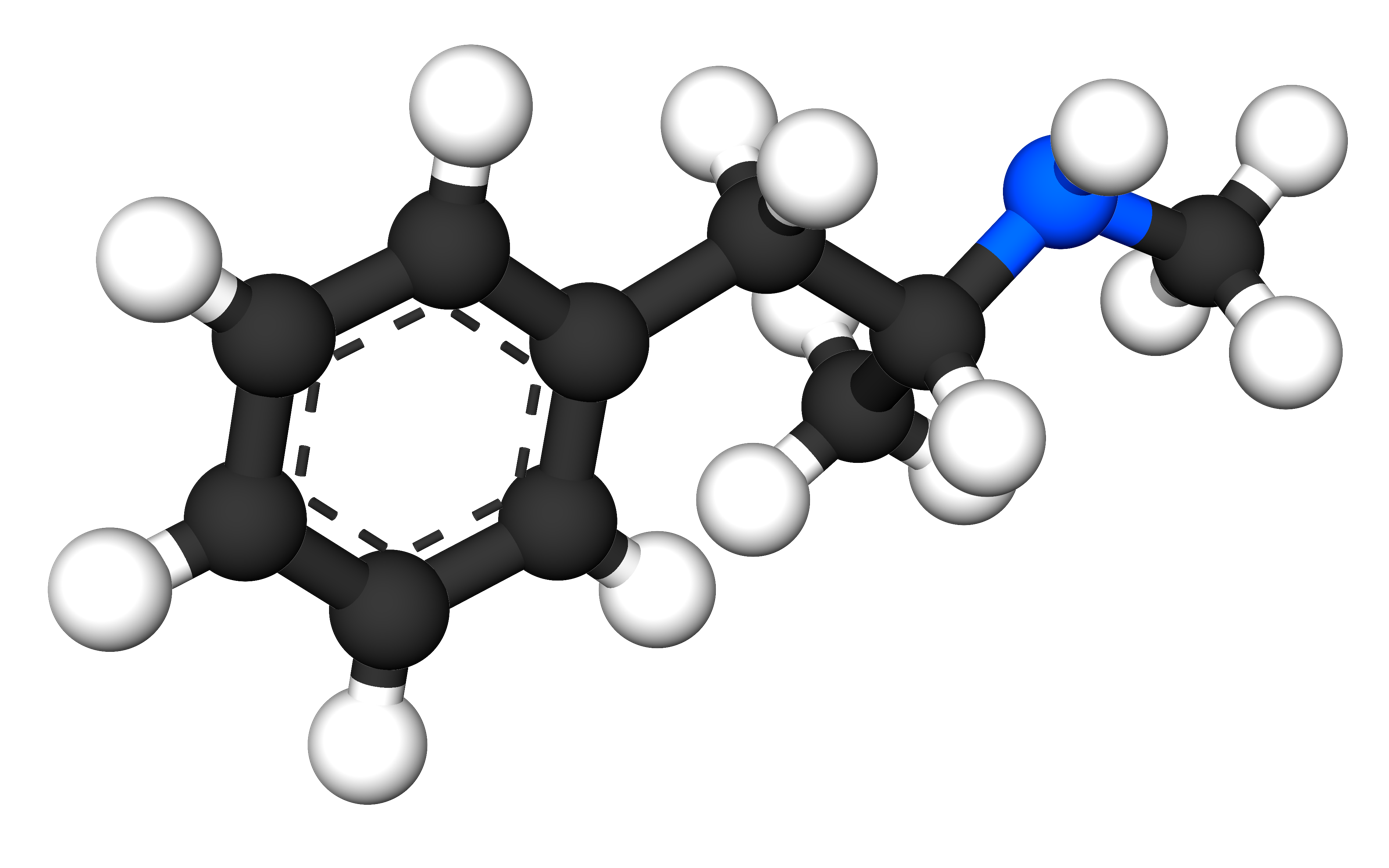
Ball-and-stick models of methamphetamine enantiomers

Clinical data
- Pronunciation: /ˌmɛθæmˈfɛtəmiːn/ (METH-am-FET-ə-meen), /ˌmɛθəmˈfɛtəmiːn/ (METH-əm-FET-ə-meen), /ˌmɛθəmˈfɛtəmən/ (METH-əm-FET-ə-mən)
- Trade names: Desoxyn, others
- Other names: N-methylamphetamine, N,α-dimethylphenethylamine, desoxyephedrine
- AHFS/Drugs.com: Monograph
- Pregnancy category: AU: X (High risk)
- Dependence liability: Physical: None; Psychological: Very high
- Addiction liability: Very high
- Routes of administration: By mouth, intravenous, intramuscular, subcutaneous, inhalation, insufflation, rectal, vaginal
- Drug class: Stimulant; Serotonin–norepinephrine–dopamine releasing agent
- ATC code: N06BA03 (WHO)

Legal status
- Legal status: AU: S8 (Controlled drug); BR: Class F2 (Prohibited psychotropics); CA: Schedule I; DE: Anlage II (Authorized trade only, not prescriptible); NZ: Class A; UK: Class A; US: Schedule II; UN: Psychotropic Schedule II; EU: Rx-only; SE: Förteckning II

Pharmacokinetic data
- Bioavailability: Oral: 67% Intranasal: 79% Inhalation: 67–90% Intravenous: 100%
- Protein binding: Varies widely
- Metabolism: CYP2D6 and FMO3
- Metabolites: • Amphetamine • Pholedrine • N-Hydroxymethamphetamine • Norephedrine
- Onset of action: Oral: 3 hours (peak); Intranasal: <15 minutes Inhalation: <18 minutes Intravenous: <15 minutes
- Elimination half-life: 9–12 hours (range 5–30 hours); irrespective of route
- Duration of action: 8–12 hours
- Excretion: Primarily kidney

Identifiers
- IUPAC name: (RS)-N-methyl-1-phenylpropan-2-amine
- CAS Number: 537-46-2; (dl)-Methamphetamine hydrochloride: 300-42-5
- PubChem CID: 1206
- IUPHAR/BPS: 4803
- DrugBank: DB01577
- ChemSpider: 1169
- UNII: 44RAL3456C; (dl)-Methamphetamine hydrochloride: 24GNZ56D62
- KEGG: D08187
- ChEBI: CHEBI:6809
- ChEMBL: ChEMBL1201201
- PDB ligand: B40 (PDBe, RCSB PDB)
- CompTox Dashboard (EPA): DTXSID3043861
- ECHA InfoCard: 100.028.690 100.023.121, 100.028.690

Chemical and physical data
- Formula: C_{10}H_{15}N
- Molar mass: 149.237 g·mol^{−1}
- 3D model (JSmol): Interactive image
- Chirality: Racemic mixture
- Melting point: 170 °C (338 °F)
- Boiling point: 212 °C (414 °F) at 760 mmHg
- SMILES: CNC(C)Cc1ccccc1
- InChI: InChI=1S/C10H15N/c1-9(11-2)8-10-6-4-3-5-7-10/h3-7,9,11H,8H2,1-2H3; Key:MYWUZJCMWCOHBA-UHFFFAOYSA-N

Methamphetamine (Note: Methamphetamine is contracted from N-methylamphetamine. Synonyms and alternate spellings include: N-methylamphetamine, desoxyephedrine, Syndrox, Methedrine, and Desoxyn. Common slang names for methamphetamine include: meth, speed, crank, and shabu (also sabu and shabu-shabu) in Indonesia and the Philippines, and for the hydrochloride crystal, crystal meth, glass, shards, and ice, and, in Canada, hoot, Tina, and, in New Zealand, P/Pure.) is a central nervous system (CNS) stimulant that is primarily used as a recreational or performance-enhancing drug and less commonly as a second-line treatment for attention deficit hyperactivity disorder (ADHD). It has also been researched as a potential treatment for traumatic brain injury. Methamphetamine was discovered in 1893 and exists as two enantiomers: levo-methamphetamine and dextro-methamphetamine. (Note: Enantiomers are molecules that are mirror images of one another; they are structurally identical, but of the opposite orientation. Levomethamphetamine and dextromethamphetamine are also known as L-methamphetamine, (R)-methamphetamine, or levmetamfetamine (International Nonproprietary Name [INN]) and D-methamphetamine, (S)-methamphetamine, or metamfetamine (INN), respectively.) Methamphetamine properly refers to a specific chemical substance, the racemic free base, which is an equal mixture of levomethamphetamine and dextromethamphetamine in their pure amine forms, but the hydrochloride salt, commonly called crystal meth, is widely used. Methamphetamine is rarely prescribed over concerns involving its potential for misuse as an aphrodisiac and euphoriant, among other concerns, as well as the availability of other drugs with comparable effects and treatment efficacy such as dextroamphetamine and lisdexamfetamine. While pharmaceutical formulations of methamphetamine in the United States are labeled as methamphetamine hydrochloride, they contain dextromethamphetamine as the active ingredient. (Note: The medication package insert for Desoxyn lists the chemical name (S)-N,α-dimethylbenzeneethanamine hydrochloride, which explicitly identifies the compound as dextromethamphetamine (the S-enantiomer) with no stereochemical ambiguity.) Dextromethamphetamine is a stronger CNS stimulant than levomethamphetamine.

Both racemic methamphetamine and dextromethamphetamine are illicitly trafficked and sold owing to their potential for recreational use and ease of manufacture. The highest prevalence of illegal methamphetamine use occurs in parts of Asia and Oceania, and in the United States, where racemic methamphetamine and dextromethamphetamine are classified as Schedule II controlled substances. Levomethamphetamine is available as an over-the-counter (OTC) drug for use as an inhaled nasal decongestant in the United States and is seldom abused. (Note: The active ingredient in some OTC inhalers in the United States is listed as levmetamfetamine, the INN and USAN of levomethamphetamine.) Internationally, the production, distribution, sale, and possession of methamphetamine is restricted or banned in many countries, owing to its placement in schedule II of the United Nations Convention on Psychotropic Substances treaty. While dextromethamphetamine is a more potent drug, racemic methamphetamine is illicitly produced more often, owing to the relative ease of synthesis and regulatory limits of chemical precursor availability.

The effects of methamphetamine are nearly identical to other substituted amphetamines. In low to moderate and therapeutic doses (5–25 mg orally), methamphetamine produces typical SNDRA effects and may elevate mood, increase alertness, concentration, and energy, reduce appetite, and promote weight loss. In overdose or during extended binges, it may induce psychosis, breakdown of skeletal muscle, seizures, and bleeding in the brain. Chronic high-dose use can precipitate unpredictable and rapid mood swings, stimulant psychosis (e.g., paranoia, hallucinations, delirium, and delusions), and aggression. Recreationally, methamphetamine's ability to increase energy has been reported to lift mood and increase sexual desire to such an extent that users are able to engage in sexual activity continuously for several days while binging the drug. Methamphetamine is known to possess a high abuse liability (a high likelihood that extratherapeutic use will lead to compulsive drug use) and high psychological dependence liability (a high likelihood that withdrawal symptoms will occur when methamphetamine use ceases). Discontinuing methamphetamine after heavy use may lead to a post-acute-withdrawal syndrome, which can persist for months beyond the typical withdrawal period. At high doses, like other substituted amphetamines, methamphetamine is neurotoxic to human midbrain dopaminergic neurons and, to a lesser extent, serotonergic neurons. Methamphetamine neurotoxicity causes adverse changes in brain structure and function, such as reductions in grey matter volume in several brain regions, as well as adverse changes in markers of metabolic integrity.

Methamphetamine belongs to the substituted phenethylamine and substituted amphetamine chemical classes and as a drug acts as a serotonin–norepinephrine–dopamine releasing agent. It is related to the other dimethylphenethylamines as a positional isomer of these compounds, which share the common chemical formula C_{10}H_{15}N.

== Uses ==
=== Medical ===
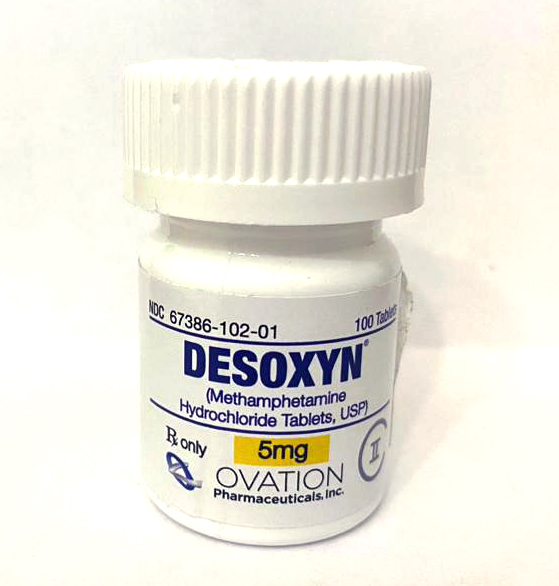
Bottle of 5mg Desoxyn (methamphetamine hydrochloride) tablets

In the United States, methamphetamine hydrochloride, sold under the brand name Desoxyn, is FDA-approved for the treatment of attention deficit hyperactivity disorder (ADHD); however, the FDA notes that the limited therapeutic usefulness of methamphetamine should be weighed against the risks associated with its use. To avoid toxicity and risk of side effects, FDA guidelines recommend an initial dose of methamphetamine at doses 5–10 mg/day for ADHD in adults and children over six years of age, which may be increased at weekly intervals of 5 mg, up to 25 mg/day, until optimum clinical response is found; the usual effective dose is around 20–25 mg/day. Methamphetamine is sometimes prescribed off-label for obesity, narcolepsy, and idiopathic hypersomnia. In the United States, methamphetamine's levorotary form is available in some over-the-counter (OTC) nasal decongestant products.

Although the pharmaceutical name "methamphetamine hydrochloride" may suggest a racemic mixture, Desoxyn contains enantiopure dextromethamphetamine, which is a more potent stimulant than both levomethamphetamine and racemic methamphetamine. This naming convention deviates from the standard practice observed with other stimulants, such as Adderall and dextroamphetamine, where the dextrorotary enantiomer is explicitly identified as an active ingredient in both generic and brand-name pharmaceuticals.

As methamphetamine is associated with a high potential for misuse, the drug is regulated under the Controlled Substances Act and is listed under Schedule II in the United States. Methamphetamine hydrochloride dispensed in the United States is required to include a boxed warning regarding its potential for recreational misuse and addiction liability.

Desoxyn Gradumet was an extended-release form of the drug. It is no longer produced.

=== Recreational ===
Methamphetamine is often used recreationally for its effects as a potent euphoriant and stimulant as well as aphrodisiac qualities.

A subculture known as party and play is based around sexual activity and methamphetamine use. Participants in this subculture, which consists mostly of homosexual male methamphetamine users, will typically meet up through internet dating sites and have sex. Because of its strong stimulant and aphrodisiac effects and inhibitory effect on ejaculation, with repeated use, these sexual encounters will sometimes occur continuously for several days on end. The crash following the use of methamphetamine in this manner is very often severe, with marked hypersomnia (excessive daytime sleepiness). The party and play subculture is prevalent in major US cities such as San Francisco and New York City.

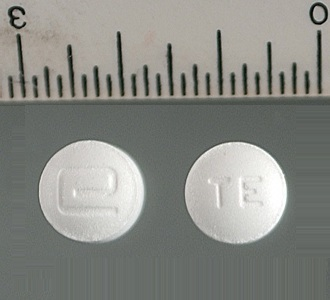
Desoxyn tablets – pharmaceutical methamphetamine hydrochloride

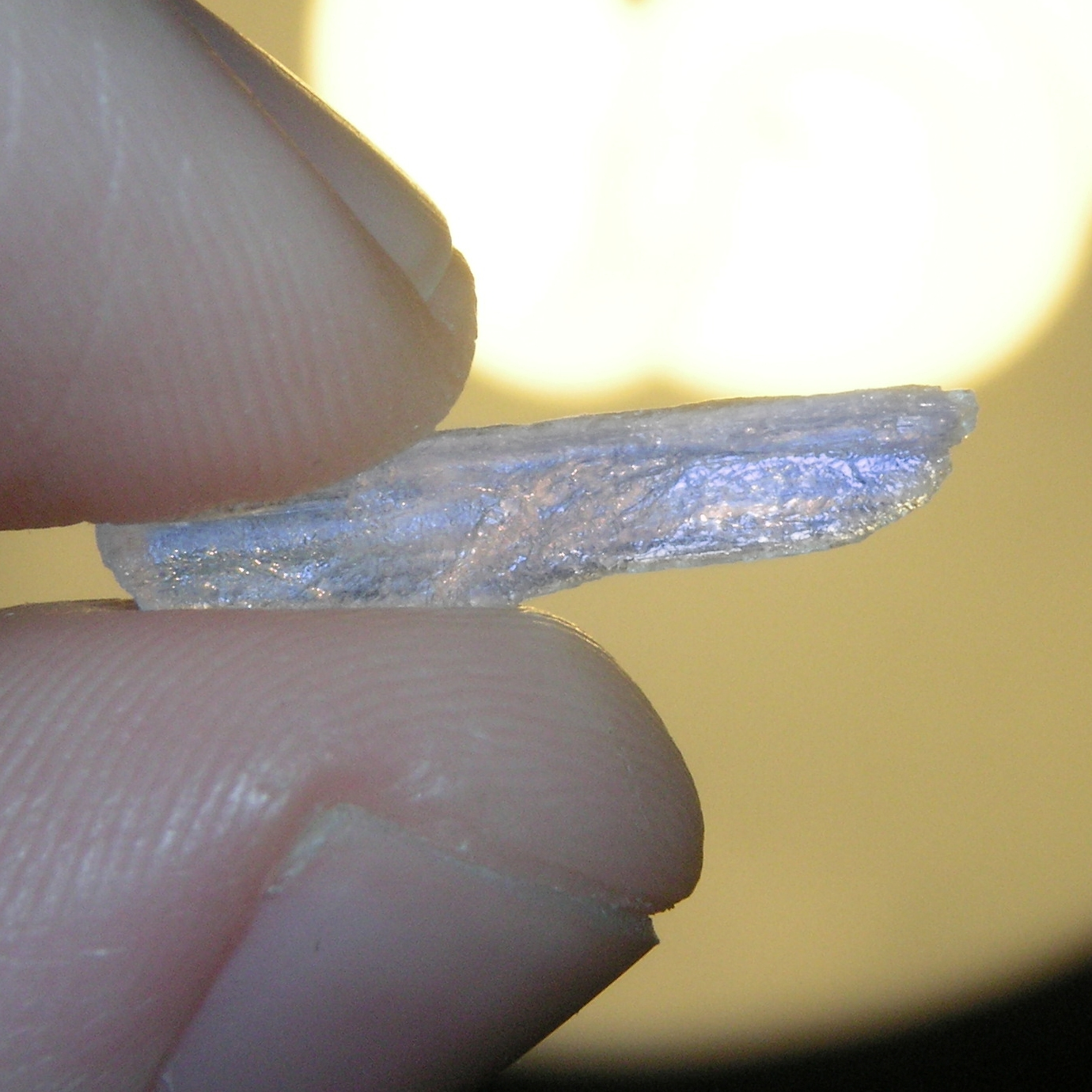
Crystal meth – illicit methamphetamine hydrochloride

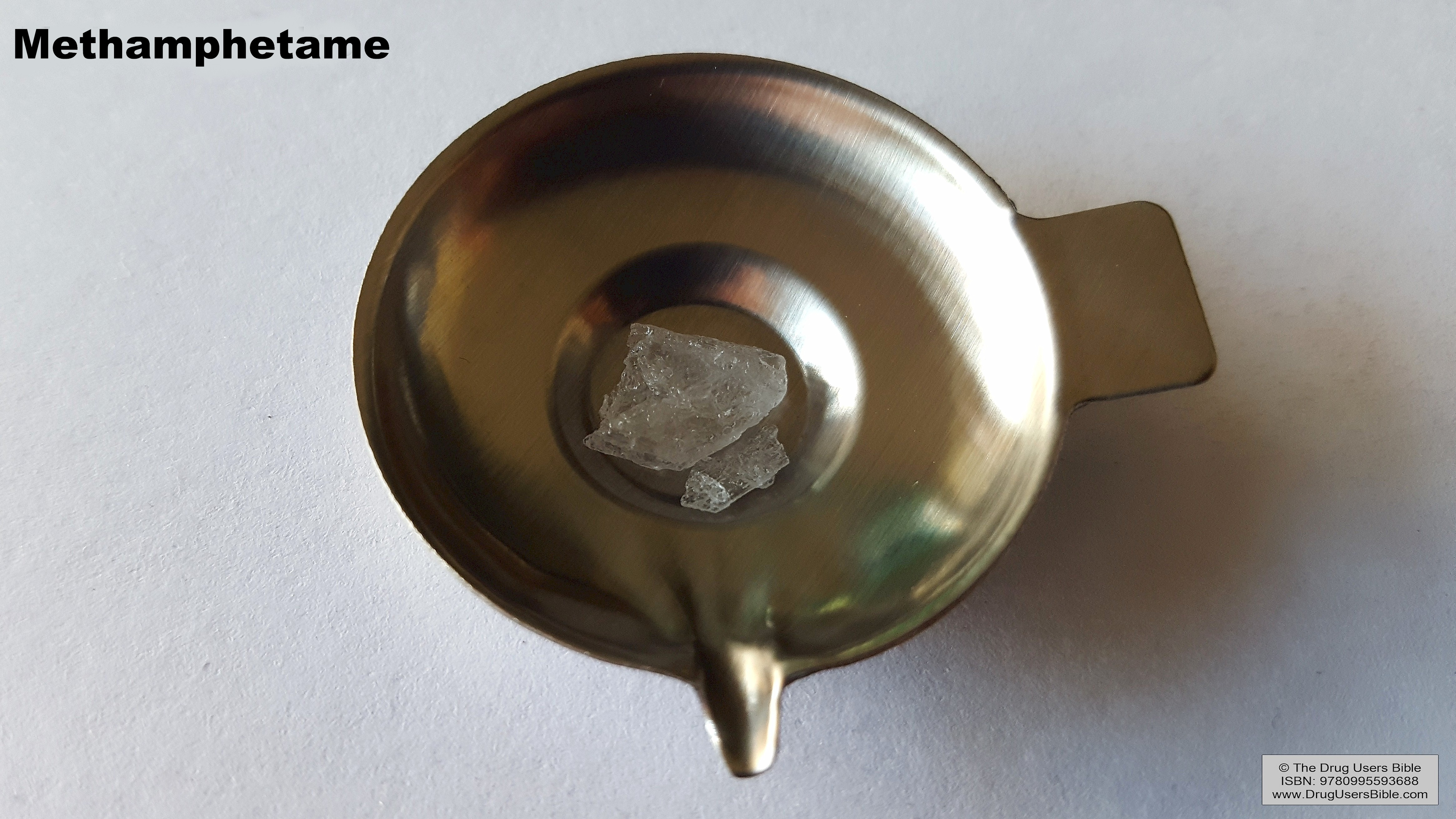
Methamphetamine shards on a metal milligram scale tray

== Contraindications ==
Methamphetamine is contraindicated in individuals with a history of substance use disorder, heart disease, or severe agitation or anxiety, or in individuals currently experiencing arteriosclerosis, glaucoma, hyperthyroidism, or severe hypertension. The FDA states that individuals who have experienced hypersensitivity reactions to other stimulants in the past or are currently taking monoamine oxidase inhibitors should not take methamphetamine. The FDA also advises individuals with bipolar disorder, depression, elevated blood pressure, liver or kidney problems, mania, psychosis, Raynaud's phenomenon, seizures, thyroid problems, tics, or Tourette syndrome to monitor their symptoms while taking methamphetamine. Owing to the potential for stunted growth, the FDA advises monitoring the height and weight of growing children and adolescents during treatment.

== Adverse effects ==
A 2010 study ranking various illegal and legal drugs based on statements by drug-harm experts. Methamphetamine was found to be the fourth most damaging to users. However, Nutt's concept and methodology were criticised sharply from a scientific perspective.

Main short and long term adverse physical and mental effects that may appear in methamphetamine use

=== Physical ===
==== Cardiovascular ====
Methamphetamine is a sympathomimetic drug that causes vasoconstriction and tachycardia. Methamphetamine also promotes abnormal extra heartbeats and irregular heart rhythms, which may be life-threatening.

==== Other physical effects ====
The effects can also include loss of appetite, hyperactivity, dilated pupils, flushed skin, excessive sweating, increased movement, dry mouth and teeth grinding (potentially leading to condition informally known as meth mouth), headache, rapid breathing, high body temperature, diarrhea, constipation, blurred vision, dizziness, twitching, numbness, tremors, dry skin, acne, and pale appearance. Long-term methamphetamine abuse compounds these effects; xerodermia may lead to the development of sores on the skin, as well as compulsive scratching due to pruritis and/or formication. Numerous deaths related to methamphetamine overdoses have been reported. Additionally, "[p]ostmortem examinations of human tissues have linked use of the drug to diseases associated with aging, such as coronary atherosclerosis and pulmonary fibrosis", which may be caused "by a considerable rise in the formation of ceramides, pro-inflammatory molecules that can foster cell aging and death."

==== Dental and oral health ("meth mouth") ====
A suspected case of meth mouth

Methamphetamine users, particularly heavy users, may lose their teeth abnormally quickly, regardless of the route of administration, from a condition informally known as meth mouth. The condition is generally most severe in users who inject the drug, rather than swallow, smoke, or inhale it. According to the American Dental Association, meth mouth "is probably caused by a combination of drug-induced psychological and physiological changes resulting in xerostomia (dry mouth), extended periods of poor oral hygiene, frequent consumption of high-calorie, carbonated beverages and bruxism (teeth grinding and clenching)". As dry mouth is also a common side effect of other stimulants, which are not known to contribute severe tooth decay, many researchers suggest that methamphetamine-associated tooth decay is more due to users' other choices. They suggest the side effect has been exaggerated and stylized to create a stereotype of current users as a deterrence for new ones.

==== Sexually transmitted infection ====
Methamphetamine use was found to be related to higher frequencies of unprotected sexual intercourse in both HIV-positive and unknown casual partners, an association more pronounced in HIV-positive participants. These findings suggest that methamphetamine use and engagement in unprotected anal intercourse are co-occurring risk behaviors, behaviors that potentially heighten the risk of HIV transmission among gay and bisexual men. Methamphetamine use allows users of both sexes to engage in prolonged sexual activity, which may cause genital sores and abrasions as well as priapism in men. Methamphetamine may also cause sores and abrasions in the mouth via bruxism, increasing the risk of sexually transmitted infection.

Besides the sexual transmission of HIV, it may also be transmitted between users who share a common needle. The level of needle sharing among methamphetamine users is similar to that among other drug injection users.

=== Psychological ===
The psychological effects of methamphetamine can include euphoria, dysphoria, changes in libido, alertness, apprehension and concentration, decreased sense of fatigue, insomnia or wakefulness, self-confidence, sociability, irritability, restlessness, grandiosity and repetitive and obsessive behaviors. Peculiar to methamphetamine and related stimulants is "punding", persistent non-goal-directed repetitive activity. Methamphetamine use also has a high association with anxiety, depression, amphetamine psychosis, suicide, and violent behaviors.

=== Neurotoxicity ===
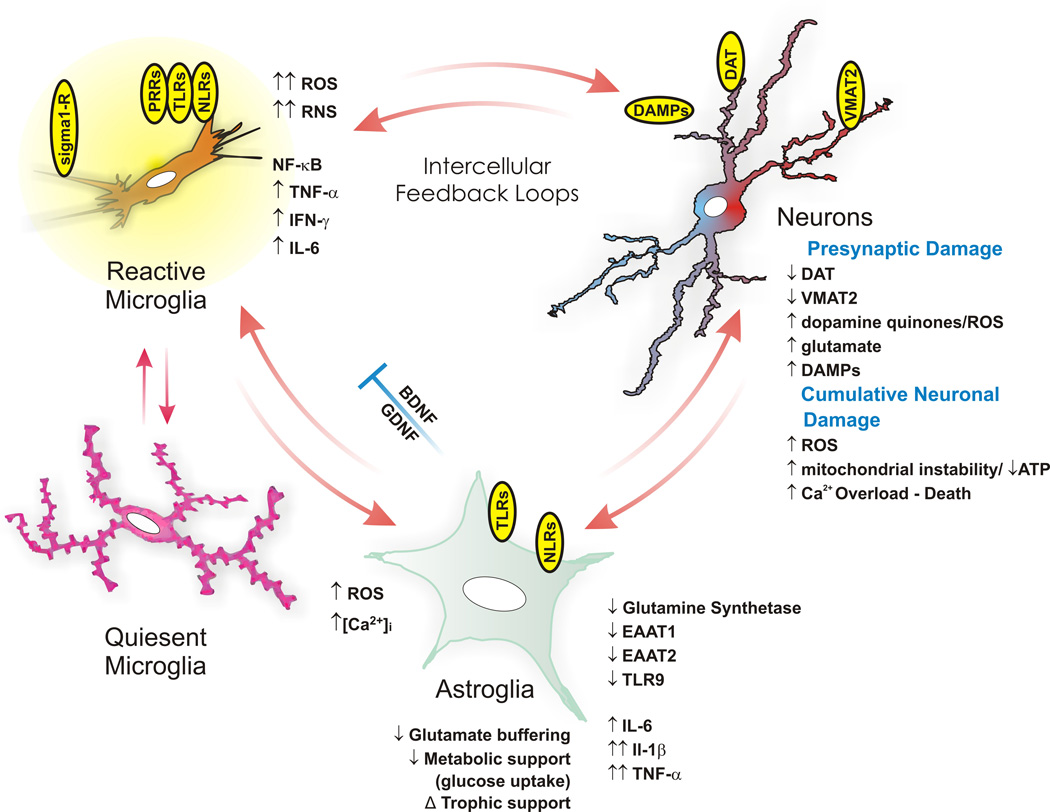
This diagram depicts the neuroimmune mechanisms that mediate methamphetamine-induced neurodegeneration in the human brain. The NF-κB-mediated neuroimmune response to methamphetamine use which results in the increased permeability of the blood–brain barrier arises through its binding at and activation of sigma receptors, the increased production of reactive oxygen species (ROS), reactive nitrogen species (RNS), and damage-associated molecular pattern molecules (DAMPs), the dysregulation of glutamate transporters (specifically, EAAT1 and EAAT2) and glucose metabolism, and excessive Ca^{2+} ion influx in glial cells and dopamine neurons.

Methamphetamine is neurotoxic to dopaminergic systems in lab animals and is associated with dopaminergic toxicity in humans. Excitotoxicity, oxidative stress, metabolic compromise, UPS dysfunction, protein nitration, endoplasmic reticulum stress, p53 expression and other processes contribute to this neurotoxicity. In line with its dopaminergic neurotoxicity, methamphetamine use is associated with a higher risk of Parkinson's disease. In addition to its dopaminergic neurotoxicity, a review of human studies indicated that chronic methamphetamine use is associated with serotonergic neurotoxicity. It has been demonstrated that a high core temperature is correlated with an increase in the neurotoxic effects of methamphetamine. Withdrawal of methamphetamine in dependent persons may lead to post-acute withdrawal which persists months beyond the typical withdrawal period.

Magnetic resonance imaging studies on human methamphetamine users have also found evidence of neurodegeneration, or adverse neuroplastic changes in brain structure and function. In particular, methamphetamine appears to cause hyperintensity and hypertrophy of white matter, marked shrinkage of hippocampi, and reduced gray matter in the cingulate cortex, limbic cortex, and paralimbic cortex in recreational methamphetamine users. Moreover, evidence suggests that adverse changes in the level of biomarkers of metabolic integrity and synthesis occur in recreational users, such as a reduction in N-acetylaspartate and creatine levels and elevated levels of choline and myoinositol.

Methamphetamine has been shown to activate TAAR1 in human astrocytes and generate cAMP as a result. Activation of astrocyte-localized TAAR1 appears to function as a mechanism by which methamphetamine attenuates membrane-bound EAAT2 (SLC1A2) levels and function in these cells.

Methamphetamine binds to and activates both sigma receptor subtypes, σ_{1} and σ_{2}, with micromolar affinity. Sigma receptor activation may promote methamphetamine-induced neurotoxicity by facilitating hyperthermia, increasing dopamine synthesis and release, influencing microglial activation, and modulating apoptotic signaling cascades and the formation of reactive oxygen species.

=== Addiction ===
Addiction and dependence glossary
- addiction – a neuropsychological disorder characterized by a persistent and intense urge to use a drug or engage in a behavior that produces natural reward; addictive drug – psychoactive substances that with repeated use are associated with significantly higher rates of substance use disorders, due in large part to the drug's effect on brain reward systems; dependence – an adaptive state associated with a withdrawal syndrome upon cessation of repeated exposure to a stimulus (e.g., drug intake); drug sensitization or reverse tolerance – the escalating effect of a drug resulting from repeated administration at a given dose; drug withdrawal – symptoms that occur upon cessation of repeated drug use; physical dependence – dependence that involves persistent physical–somatic withdrawal symptoms (e.g., delirium tremens and nausea); psychological dependence – dependence that is characterized by emotional-motivational withdrawal symptoms (e.g., anhedonia and anxiety) that affect cognitive functioning.; reinforcing stimuli – stimuli that increase the probability of repeating behaviors paired with them; rewarding stimuli – stimuli that the brain interprets as intrinsically positive and desirable or as something to approach; sensitization – an amplified response to a stimulus resulting from repeated exposure to it; substance use disorder – a condition in which the use of substances leads to clinically and functionally significant impairment or distress; drug tolerance – the diminishing effect of a drug resulting from repeated administration at a given dose

Signaling cascade in the nucleus accumbens that results in psychostimulant addiction
This diagram depicts the signaling events in the brain's reward center that are induced by chronic high-dose exposure to psychostimulants that increase the concentration of synaptic dopamine, like amphetamine, methamphetamine, and phenethylamine. Following presynaptic dopamine and glutamate co-release by such psychostimulants, postsynaptic receptors for these neurotransmitters trigger internal signaling events through a cAMP-dependent pathway and a calcium-dependent pathway that ultimately result in increased CREB phosphorylation. Phosphorylated CREB increases levels of ΔFosB, which in turn represses the c-Fos gene with the help of corepressors; c-Fos repression acts as a molecular switch that enables the accumulation of ΔFosB in the neuron. A highly stable (phosphorylated) form of ΔFosB, one that persists in neurons for 1–2 months, slowly accumulates following repeated high-dose exposure to stimulants through this process. ΔFosB functions as "one of the master control proteins" that produces addiction-related structural changes in the brain, and upon sufficient accumulation, with the help of its downstream targets (e.g., nuclear factor kappa B), it induces an addictive state.

Current models of addiction from chronic drug use involve alterations in gene expression in certain parts of the brain, particularly the nucleus accumbens. The most important transcription factors (Note: Transcription factors are proteins that increase or decrease the expression of specific genes.) that produce these alterations are ΔFosB, cAMP response element binding protein (CREB), and nuclear factor kappa B (NFκB). ΔFosB plays a crucial role in the development of drug addictions, since its overexpression in D1-type medium spiny neurons in the nucleus accumbens is necessary and sufficient (Note: In simpler terms, this necessary and sufficient relationship means that ΔFosB overexpression in the nucleus accumbens and addiction-related behavioral and neural adaptations always occur together and never occur alone.) for most of the behavioral and neural adaptations that arise from addiction. Once ΔFosB is sufficiently overexpressed, it induces an addictive state that becomes increasingly more severe with further increases in ΔFosB expression. It has been implicated in addictions to alcohol, cannabinoids, cocaine, methylphenidate, nicotine, opioids, phencyclidine, propofol, and substituted amphetamines, among others.

ΔJunD, a transcription factor, and G9a, a histone methyltransferase enzyme, both directly oppose the induction of ΔFosB in the nucleus accumbens (i.e., they oppose increases in its expression). Sufficiently overexpressing ΔJunD in the nucleus accumbens with viral vectors can completely block many of the neural and behavioral alterations seen in chronic drug use (i.e., the alterations mediated by ΔFosB). ΔFosB also plays an important role in regulating behavioral responses to natural rewards, such as palatable food, sex, and exercise. Since both natural rewards and addictive drugs induce expression of ΔFosB (i.e., they cause the brain to produce more of it), chronic acquisition of these rewards can result in a similar pathological state of addiction. ΔFosB is the most significant factor involved in both amphetamine addiction and amphetamine-induced sex addictions, which are compulsive sexual behaviors that result from excessive sexual activity and amphetamine use. (Note: The associated research only involved amphetamine, not methamphetamine; however, this statement is included here due to the similarity between the pharmacodynamics and aphrodisiac effects of amphetamine and methamphetamine.) These sex addictions (i.e., drug-induced compulsive sexual behaviors) are associated with a dopamine dysregulation syndrome which occurs in some patients taking dopaminergic drugs, such as amphetamine or methamphetamine.

==== Epigenetic factors ====
Methamphetamine addiction is persistent for many individuals, with 61% of individuals treated for addiction relapsing within one year. About half of those with methamphetamine addiction continue with use over a ten-year period, while the other half reduce use starting at about one to four years after initial use.

The frequent persistence of addiction suggests that long-lasting changes in gene expression may occur in particular regions of the brain, and may contribute importantly to the addiction phenotype. In 2014, a crucial role was found for epigenetic mechanisms in driving lasting changes in gene expression in the brain.

A review in 2015 summarized a number of studies involving chronic methamphetamine use in rodents. Epigenetic alterations were observed in the brain reward pathways, including areas like ventral tegmental area, nucleus accumbens, and dorsal striatum, the hippocampus, and the prefrontal cortex. Chronic methamphetamine use caused gene-specific histone acetylations, deacetylations and methylations. Gene-specific DNA methylations in particular regions of the brain were also observed. The various epigenetic alterations caused downregulations or upregulations of specific genes important in addiction. For instance, chronic methamphetamine use caused methylation of the lysine in position 4 of histone 3 located at the promoters of the c-fos and the C-C chemokine receptor 2 (ccr2) genes, activating those genes in the nucleus accumbens (NAc). c-fos is well known to be important in addiction. The ccr2 gene is also important in addiction, since mutational inactivation of this gene impairs addiction.

In methamphetamine addicted rats, epigenetic regulation through reduced acetylation of histones, in brain striatal neurons, caused reduced transcription of glutamate receptors. Glutamate receptors play an important role in regulating the reinforcing effects of addictive drugs.

Administration of methamphetamine to rodents causes DNA damage in their brain, particularly in the nucleus accumbens region. During repair of such DNA damages, persistent chromatin alterations may occur such as in the methylation of DNA or the acetylation or methylation of histones at the sites of repair. These alterations can be epigenetic scars in the chromatin that contribute to the persistent epigenetic changes found in methamphetamine addiction.

==== Treatment and management ====
A 2018 systematic review and network meta-analysis of 50 trials involving 12 different psychosocial interventions for amphetamine, methamphetamine, or cocaine addiction found that combination therapy with both contingency management and community reinforcement approach had the highest efficacy (i.e., abstinence rate) and acceptability (i.e., lowest dropout rate). Other treatment modalities examined in the analysis included monotherapy with contingency management or community reinforcement approach, cognitive behavioral therapy, 12-step programs, non-contingent reward-based therapies, psychodynamic therapy, and other combination therapies involving these.

As of December 2019, there is no effective pharmacotherapy for methamphetamine addiction. A systematic review and meta-analysis from 2019 assessed the efficacy of 17 different pharmacotherapies used in randomized controlled trials (RCTs) for amphetamine and methamphetamine addiction; it found only low-strength evidence that methylphenidate might reduce amphetamine or methamphetamine self-administration. There was low-to moderate-strength evidence of no benefit for most of the other medications used in RCTs, which included antidepressants (bupropion, mirtazapine, sertraline), antipsychotics (aripiprazole), anticonvulsants (topiramate, baclofen, gabapentin), naltrexone, varenicline, citicoline, ondansetron, prometa, riluzole, atomoxetine, dextroamphetamine, and modafinil.

Medication-Assisted Treatment (MAT) combines FDA-approved medications with behavioral therapies to address substance use disorders. This approach aims to reduce cravings and withdrawal symptoms, supporting individuals in their recovery process.

==== Dependence and withdrawal ====
Tolerance is expected to develop with regular methamphetamine use and, when used recreationally, this tolerance develops rapidly. In dependent users, withdrawal symptoms are positively correlated with the level of drug tolerance. Depression from methamphetamine withdrawal lasts longer and is more severe than that of cocaine withdrawal.

According to the current Cochrane review on drug dependence and withdrawal in recreational users of methamphetamine, "when chronic heavy users abruptly discontinue [methamphetamine] use, many report a time-limited withdrawal syndrome that occurs within 24 hours of their last dose". Withdrawal symptoms in chronic, high-dose users are frequent, occurring in up to 87.6% of cases, and persist for three to four weeks with a marked "crash" phase occurring during the first week. Methamphetamine withdrawal symptoms can include anxiety, drug craving, dysphoric mood, fatigue, increased appetite, increased movement or decreased movement, lack of motivation, sleeplessness or sleepiness, and vivid or lucid dreams.

Methamphetamine that is present in a mother's bloodstream can pass through the placenta to a fetus and be secreted into breast milk. Infants born to methamphetamine-abusing mothers may experience a neonatal withdrawal syndrome, with symptoms involving of abnormal sleep patterns, poor feeding, tremors, and hypertonia. This withdrawal syndrome is relatively mild and only requires medical intervention in approximately 4% of cases.

Summary of addiction-related plasticity
Form of neuroplasticity or behavioral plasticity	Type of reinforcer						Ref.
Form of neuroplasticity or behavioral plasticity	Opiates	Psychostimulants	High fat or sugar food	Sexual intercourse	Physical exercise (aerobic)	Environmental enrichment	Ref.
ΔFosB expression in nucleus accumbens D1-type MSNs	↑	↑	↑	↑	↑	↑	
Behavioral plasticity
Escalation of intake	Yes	Yes	Yes				
Psychostimulant cross-sensitization	Yes	Not applicable	Yes	Yes	Attenuated	Attenuated	
Psychostimulant self-administration	↑	↑	↓		↓	↓	
Psychostimulant conditioned place preference	↑	↑	↓	↑	↓	↑	
Reinstatement of drug-seeking behavior	↑	↑			↓	↓	
Neurochemical plasticity
CREB phosphorylation in the nucleus accumbens	↓	↓	↓		↓	↓	
Sensitized dopamine response in the nucleus accumbens	No	Yes	No	Yes			
Altered striatal dopamine signaling	↓DRD2, ↑DRD3	↑DRD1, ↓DRD2, ↑DRD3	↑DRD1, ↓DRD2, ↑DRD3		↑DRD2	↑DRD2	
Altered striatal opioid signaling	No change or ↑μ-opioid receptors	↑μ-opioid receptors ↑κ-opioid receptors	↑μ-opioid receptors	↑μ-opioid receptors	No change	No change	
Changes in striatal opioid peptides	↑dynorphin No change: enkephalin	↑dynorphin	↓enkephalin		↑dynorphin	↑dynorphin	
Mesocorticolimbic synaptic plasticity
Number of dendrites in the nucleus accumbens	↓	↑		↑			
Dendritic spine density in the nucleus accumbens	↓	↑		↑			

=== Neonatal ===
Unlike other drugs, babies with prenatal exposure to methamphetamine do not show immediate signs of withdrawal. Instead, cognitive and behavioral problems start emerging when the children reach school age.

A prospective cohort study of 330 children showed that at the age of 3, children with methamphetamine exposure showed increased emotional reactivity, as well as more signs of anxiety and depression; and at the age of 5, children showed higher rates of externalizing disorders and attention deficit hyperactivity disorder (ADHD).

== Overdose ==
Methamphetamine overdose is a diverse term. It frequently refers to the exaggeration of the unusual effects with features such as irritability, agitation, hallucinations and paranoia. The cardiovascular effects are typically not noticed in young healthy people. Hypertension and tachycardia are not apparent unless measured. A moderate overdose of methamphetamine may induce symptoms such as: abnormal heart rhythm, confusion, difficult or painful urination, high or low blood pressure, high body temperature, over-active or over-responsive reflexes, muscle aches, severe agitation, rapid breathing, tremor, urinary hesitancy, and an inability to pass urine. An extremely large overdose may produce symptoms such as adrenergic storm, methamphetamine psychosis, substantially reduced or no urine output, cardiogenic shock, bleeding in the brain, circulatory collapse, hyperpyrexia (i.e., dangerously high body temperature), pulmonary hypertension, kidney failure, rapid muscle breakdown, serotonin syndrome, and a form of stereotypy ("tweaking"). A methamphetamine overdose will likely also result in mild brain damage owing to dopaminergic and serotonergic neurotoxicity. Death from methamphetamine poisoning is typically preceded by convulsions and coma.

=== Psychosis ===
Use of methamphetamine can result in a stimulant psychosis which may present with a variety of symptoms (e.g., paranoia, hallucinations, delirium, and delusions). A Cochrane Collaboration review on treatment for amphetamine, dextroamphetamine, and methamphetamine use-induced psychosis states that about 5–15% of users fail to recover completely. The same review asserts that, based upon at least one trial, antipsychotic medications effectively resolve the symptoms of acute amphetamine psychosis. Amphetamine psychosis may also develop occasionally as a treatment-emergent side effect.

=== Death from overdose ===
The CDC reported that the number of deaths in the United States involving psychostimulants with abuse potential to be 23,837 in 2020 and 32,537 in 2021. This category code (ICD–10 of T43.6) includes primarily methamphetamine but also other stimulants such as amphetamine, and methylphenidate. The mechanism of death in these cases is not reported in these statistics and is difficult to know. Unlike fentanyl which causes respiratory depression, methamphetamine is not a respiratory depressant. Some deaths are as a result of intracranial hemorrhage and some deaths are cardiovascular in nature including flash pulmonary edema and ventricular fibrillation.

=== Emergency treatment ===
Acute methamphetamine intoxication is largely managed by treating the symptoms and treatments may initially include administration of activated charcoal and sedation. There is not enough evidence on hemodialysis or peritoneal dialysis in cases of methamphetamine intoxication to determine their usefulness. Forced acid diuresis (e.g., with vitamin C) will increase methamphetamine excretion but is not recommended as it may increase the risk of aggravating acidosis, or cause seizures or rhabdomyolysis. Hypertension presents a risk for intracranial hemorrhage (i.e., bleeding in the brain) and, if severe, is typically treated with intravenous phentolamine or nitroprusside. Blood pressure often drops gradually following sufficient sedation with a benzodiazepine and providing a calming environment.

Antipsychotics such as haloperidol are useful in treating agitation and psychosis from methamphetamine overdose. Beta blockers with lipophilic properties and CNS penetration such as metoprolol and labetalol may be useful for treating CNS and cardiovascular toxicity. The mixed alpha- and beta-blocker labetalol is especially useful for treatment of concomitant tachycardia and hypertension induced by methamphetamine. The phenomenon of "unopposed alpha stimulation" has not been reported with the use of beta-blockers for treatment of methamphetamine toxicity.

== Interactions ==
Methamphetamine is metabolized by the liver enzyme CYP2D6, so CYP2D6 inhibitors will prolong the elimination half-life of methamphetamine. Methamphetamine also interacts with monoamine oxidase inhibitors (MAOIs), since both MAOIs and methamphetamine increase plasma catecholamines; therefore, concurrent use of both is dangerous. Methamphetamine may decrease the effects of sedatives and depressants and increase the effects of antidepressants and other stimulants as well. Methamphetamine may counteract the effects of antihypertensives and antipsychotics owing to its effects on the cardiovascular system and cognition respectively. The pH of gastrointestinal content and urine affects the absorption and excretion of methamphetamine. Specifically, acidic substances will reduce the absorption of methamphetamine and increase urinary excretion, while alkaline substances do the opposite. Owing to the effect pH has on absorption, proton pump inhibitors, which reduce gastric acid, are known to interact with methamphetamine. Norepinephrine reuptake inhibitors (NRIs) like atomoxetine prevent norepinephrine release induced by amphetamines and have been found to reduce the stimulant, euphoriant, and sympathomimetic effects of dextroamphetamine in humans. Similarly, norepinephrine–dopamine reuptake inhibitors (NRIs) like methylphenidate and bupropion prevent norepinephrine and dopamine release induced by amphetamines and bupropion has been found to reduce the subjective and sympathomimetic effects of methamphetamine in humans.

== Pharmacology ==
=== Pharmacodynamics ===
Monoamine release of methamphetamine and related agents (EC_{50}, nM)
Compound	NE	DA	5-HT	Ref
Phenethylamine	10.9	39.5	>10,000	
d-Amphetamine	6.6–7.2	5.8–24.8	698–1,765	
l-Amphetamine	9.5	27.7	ND	
d-Methamphetamine	12.3–13.8	8.5–24.5	736–1,292	
l-Methamphetamine	28.5	416	4,640	
d-Ethylamphetamine	28.8	44.1	333.0	
Notes: The smaller the value, the more strongly the drug releases the neurotransmitter. The assays were done in rat brain synaptosomes and human potencies may be different. See also Monoamine releasing agent § Activity profiles for a larger table with more compounds. Refs:

This illustration depicts the normal operation of the dopaminergic terminal to the left, and the dopaminergic terminal in the presence of methamphetamine to the right. Methamphetamine reverses the action of the dopamine transporter (DAT) by activating TAAR1 (not shown). TAAR1 activation also causes some of the dopamine transporters to move into the presynaptic neuron and cease transport (not shown). At VMAT2 (labeled VMAT), methamphetamine causes dopamine efflux (release).

Methamphetamine has been identified as a potent full agonist of trace amine-associated receptor 1 (TAAR1), a G protein-coupled receptor (GPCR) that regulates brain catecholamine systems. Activation of TAAR1 increases cyclic adenosine monophosphate (cAMP) production and either completely inhibits or reverses the transport direction of the dopamine transporter (DAT), norepinephrine transporter (NET), and serotonin transporter (SERT). When methamphetamine binds to TAAR1, it triggers transporter phosphorylation via protein kinase A (PKA) and protein kinase C (PKC) signaling, ultimately resulting in the internalization or reverse function of monoamine transporters. Methamphetamine is also known to increase intracellular calcium, an effect which is associated with DAT phosphorylation through a Ca2+/calmodulin-dependent protein kinase (CAMK)-dependent signaling pathway, in turn producing dopamine efflux. TAAR1 has been shown to reduce the firing rate of neurons through direct activation of G protein-coupled inwardly-rectifying potassium channels. TAAR1 activation by methamphetamine in astrocytes appears to negatively modulate the membrane expression and function of EAAT2, a type of glutamate transporter.

In addition to its effect on the plasma membrane monoamine transporters, methamphetamine inhibits synaptic vesicle function by inhibiting VMAT2, which prevents monoamine uptake into the vesicles and promotes their release. Methamphetamine binds to VMAT2 via the resperine site, in contrast to amphetamine, which appears to bind at the tetrabenazine site. This results in the outflow of monoamines from synaptic vesicles into the cytosol (intracellular fluid) of the presynaptic neuron, and their subsequent release into the synaptic cleft by the phosphorylated transporters. Other transporters that methamphetamine is known to inhibit are SLC22A3 and SLC22A5. SLC22A3 is an extraneuronal monoamine transporter that is present in astrocytes, and SLC22A5 is a high-affinity carnitine transporter.

Methamphetamine is also an agonist of the alpha-2 adrenergic receptors and sigma receptors with a greater affinity for σ_{1} than σ_{2}, and inhibits monoamine oxidase A (MAO-A) and monoamine oxidase B (MAO-B). Sigma receptor activation by methamphetamine may facilitate its central nervous system stimulant effects and promote neurotoxicity within the brain. Dextromethamphetamine is a stronger psychostimulant, but levomethamphetamine has stronger peripheral effects, a longer half-life, and longer perceived effects among heavy substance users. At high doses, both enantiomers of methamphetamine can induce similar stereotypy and methamphetamine psychosis, but levomethamphetamine has shorter psychodynamic effects.

=== Pharmacokinetics ===
The bioavailability of methamphetamine is 67% orally, 79% intranasally, 67 to 90% via inhalation (smoking), and 100% intravenously. Following oral administration, methamphetamine is well-absorbed into the bloodstream, with peak plasma methamphetamine concentrations achieved in approximately 3.13–6.3 hours post ingestion. Methamphetamine is also well absorbed following inhalation and following intranasal administration. Because of the high lipophilicity of methamphetamine due to its methyl group, it can readily move through the blood–brain barrier faster than other stimulants, where it is more resistant to degradation by monoamine oxidase. The amphetamine metabolite peaks at 10–24 hours. Methamphetamine is excreted by the kidneys, with the rate of excretion into the urine heavily influenced by urinary pH. When taken orally, 30–54% of the dose is excreted in urine as methamphetamine and 10–23% as amphetamine. Following IV doses, about 45% is excreted as methamphetamine and 7% as amphetamine. The elimination half-life of methamphetamine varies with a range of 5–30 hours, but it is on average 9 to 12 hours in most studies. The elimination half-life of methamphetamine does not vary by route of administration, but is subject to substantial interindividual variability.

CYP2D6, dopamine β-hydroxylase, flavin-containing monooxygenase 3, butyrate-CoA ligase, and glycine N-acyltransferase are the enzymes known to metabolize methamphetamine or its metabolites in humans. The primary metabolites are amphetamine and 4-hydroxymethamphetamine; other minor metabolites include: 4-hydroxyamphetamine, 4-hydroxynorephedrine, 4-hydroxyphenylacetone, benzoic acid, hippuric acid, norephedrine, and phenylacetone, the metabolites of amphetamine. Among these metabolites, the active sympathomimetics are amphetamine, 4‑hydroxyamphetamine, 4‑hydroxynorephedrine, 4-hydroxymethamphetamine, and norephedrine. Methamphetamine is a CYP2D6 inhibitor.

The main metabolic pathways involve aromatic para-hydroxylation, aliphatic alpha- and beta-hydroxylation, N-oxidation, N-dealkylation, and deamination. The known metabolic pathways include:

Metabolic pathways of methamphetamine in humans
The primary metabolites of methamphetamine are amphetamine and 4-hydroxymethamphetamine. Human microbiota, particularly Lactobacillus, Enterococcus, and Clostridium species, contribute to the metabolism of methamphetamine via an enzyme which N-demethylates methamphetamine and 4-hydroxymethamphetamine into amphetamine and 4-hydroxyamphetamine respectively.

==== Detection in biological fluids ====
Methamphetamine and amphetamine are often measured in urine or blood as part of a drug test for sports, employment, poisoning diagnostics, and forensics. Chiral techniques may be employed to help distinguish the source of the drug to determine whether it was obtained illicitly or legally via prescription or prodrug. Chiral separation is needed to assess the possible contribution of levomethamphetamine, which is an active ingredient in some OTC nasal decongestants, toward a positive test result. Dietary zinc supplements can mask the presence of methamphetamine and other drugs in urine.

== Chemistry ==
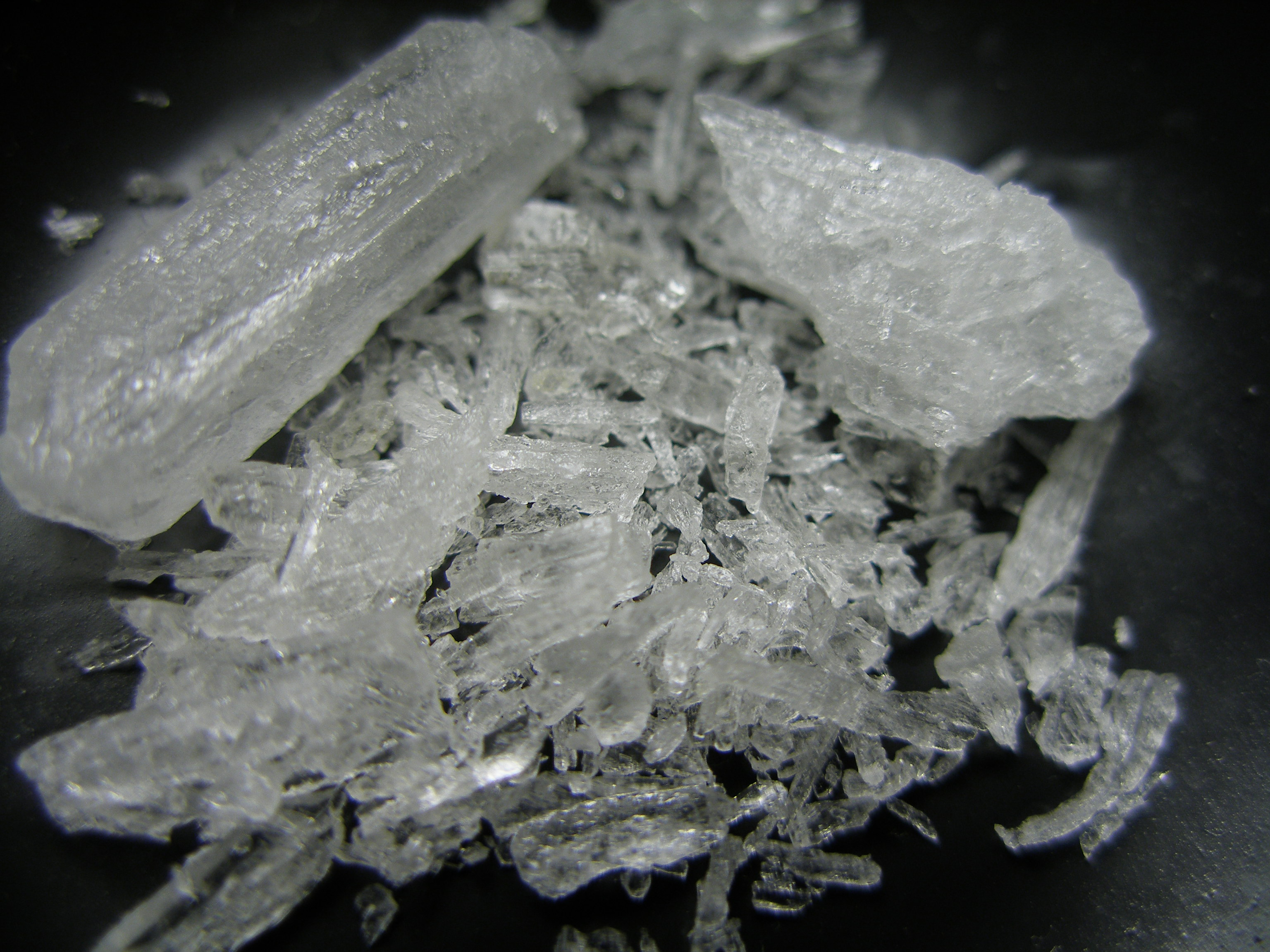
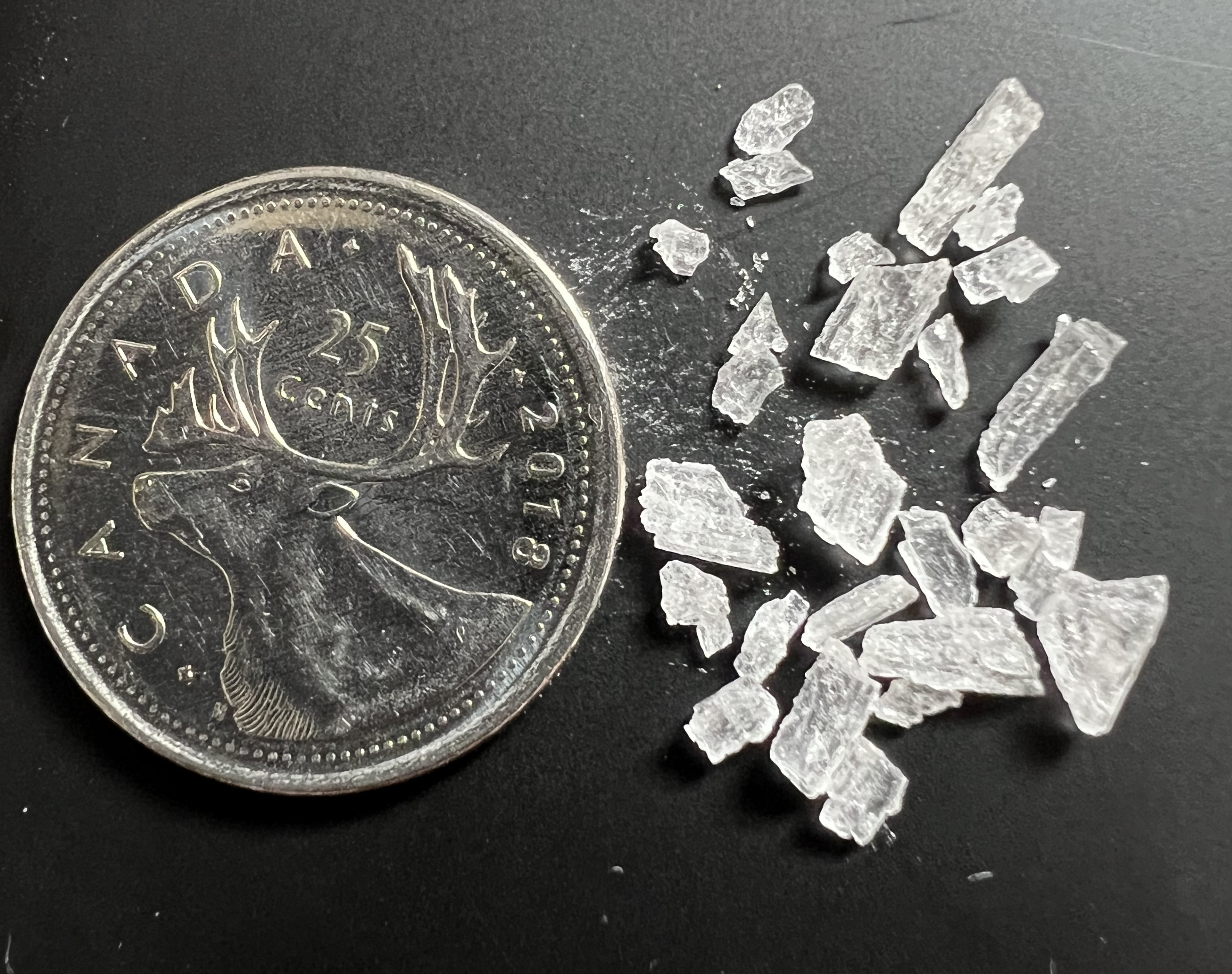
Shards of pure methamphetamine hydrochloride, also known as crystal meth

Methamphetamine is a chiral compound with two enantiomers, dextromethamphetamine and levomethamphetamine. At room temperature, the free base of methamphetamine is a clear and colorless liquid with an odor characteristic of geranium leaves. It is soluble in diethyl ether and ethanol as well as miscible with chloroform.

Chemical structures of methamphetamine enantiomers
Dextromethamphetamine

Levomethamphetamine

In contrast, the methamphetamine hydrochloride salt is odorless with a bitter taste. It has a melting point between 170 and 175 °C (338 and 347 °F) and, at room temperature, occurs as white crystals or a white crystalline powder. The hydrochloride salt is also freely soluble in ethanol and water. The crystal structure of either enantiomer is monoclinic with P2_{1} space group; at 90 K (−183.2 °C; −297.7 °F), it has lattice parameters a = 7.10 Å, b = 7.29 Å, c = 10.81 Å, and β = 97.29°.

=== Degradation ===
A 2011 study into the destruction of methamphetamine using bleach showed that effectiveness is correlated with exposure time and concentration. A year-long study (also from 2011) showed that methamphetamine in soils is a persistent pollutant. In a 2013 study of bioreactors in wastewater, methamphetamine was found to be largely degraded within 30 days under exposure to light.

=== Synthesis ===
Racemic methamphetamine may be prepared starting from phenylacetone by either the Leuckart or reductive amination methods. In the Leuckart reaction, one equivalent of phenylacetone is reacted with two equivalents of N-methylformamide to produce the formyl amide of methamphetamine plus carbon dioxide and methylamine as side products. In this reaction, an iminium cation is formed as an intermediate which is reduced by the second equivalent of N-methylformamide. The intermediate formyl amide is then hydrolyzed under acidic aqueous conditions to yield methamphetamine as the final product. Alternatively, phenylacetone can be reacted with methylamine under reducing conditions to yield methamphetamine.

Methamphetamine synthesis

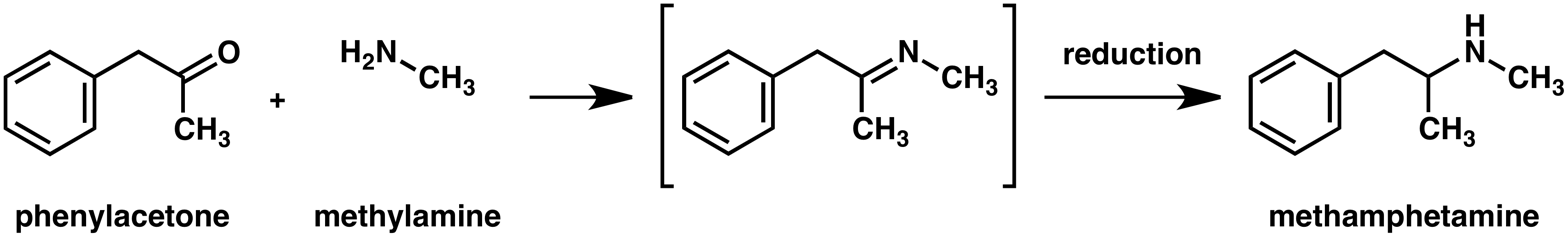
Method of methamphetamine synthesis of methamphetamine via reductive amination

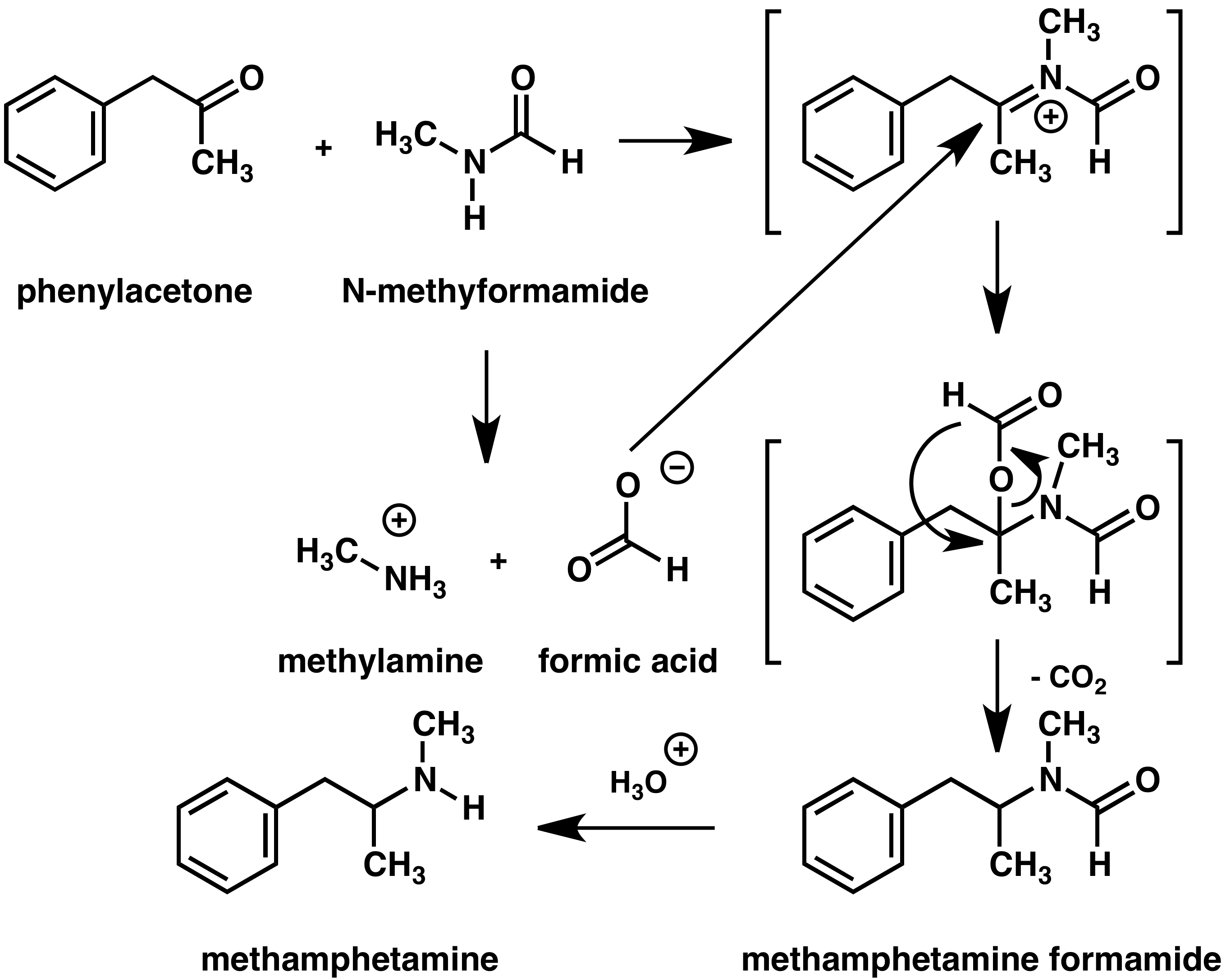
Methods of methamphetamine synthesis via the Leuckart reaction

== History, society, and culture ==
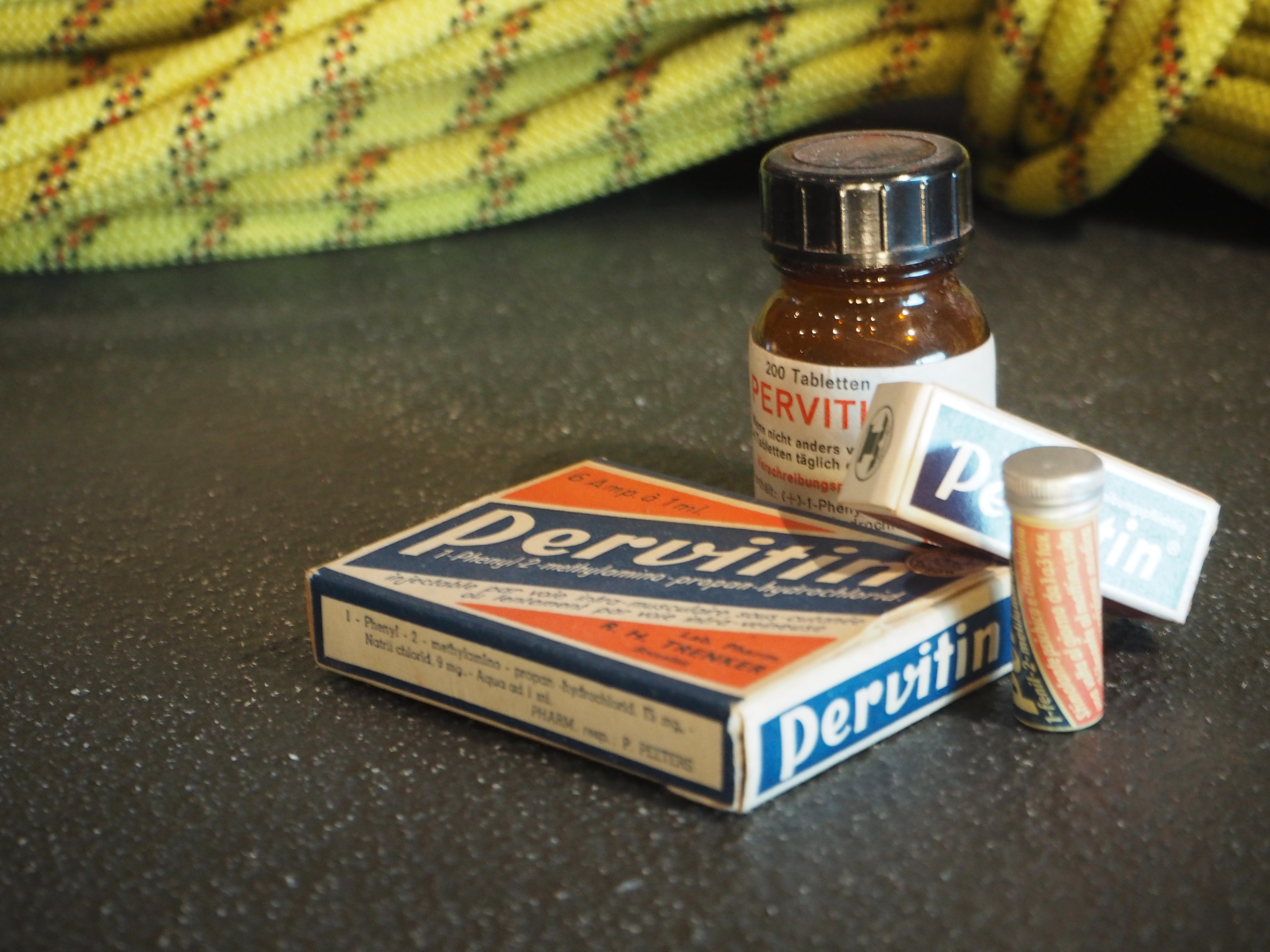
Pervitin, a methamphetamine brand used by German soldiers during World War II, was dispensed in various forms, including tablet containers.

U.S. drug overdose related fatalities in 2017 were 70,200, including 10,333 of those related to psychostimulants (including methamphetamine).

Amphetamine, discovered before methamphetamine, was first synthesized in 1887 in Germany by Romanian chemist Lazăr Edeleanu who named it phenylisopropylamine. Shortly after, methamphetamine was synthesized from ephedrine in 1893 by Japanese chemist Nagai Nagayoshi. Three decades later, in 1919, methamphetamine hydrochloride was synthesized by pharmacologist Akira Ogata via reduction of ephedrine using red phosphorus and iodine.

From 1938, methamphetamine was marketed on a large scale in Germany as a nonprescription drug under the brand name Pervitin, produced by the Berlin-based Temmler pharmaceutical company. It was used by all branches of the combined armed forces of the Third Reich, for its stimulant effects and to induce extended wakefulness. Pervitin became colloquially known among the German troops as "Panzer's Chocolate" (Panzerschokolade), "Stuka-Tablets" (Stuka-Tabletten) and "Hermann-Göring-Pills" (Hermann-Göring-Pillen), as a snide allusion to Göring's widely-known addiction to drugs. However, the side effects, particularly the withdrawal symptoms, were so serious that the army sharply cut back its usage in 1940. By 1941, usage was restricted to a doctor's prescription, and the military tightly controlled its distribution. Soldiers would only receive a couple of tablets at a time, and were discouraged from using them in combat. Historian Łukasz Kamieński says,

A soldier going to battle on Pervitin usually found himself unable to perform effectively for the next day or two. Suffering from a drug hangover and looking more like a zombie than a great warrior, he had to recover from the side effects.

Some soldiers turned violent, committing war crimes against civilians; others attacked their own officers. At the end of the war, it was used as part of a new drug: D-IX.

Obetrol, patented by Obetrol Pharmaceuticals in the 1950s and indicated for treatment of obesity, was one of the first brands of pharmaceutical methamphetamine products. Because of the psychological and stimulant effects of methamphetamine, Obetrol became a popular diet pill in the United States in the 1950s and 1960s. Eventually, as the addictive properties of the drug became known, governments began to strictly regulate the production and distribution of methamphetamine. For example, during the early 1970s in the United States, methamphetamine became a schedule II controlled substance under the Controlled Substances Act. As of January 2013, the Desoxyn trademark had been sold to Italian pharmaceutical company Recordati.

== Trafficking ==
The Golden Triangle (Southeast Asia), specifically Shan State, Myanmar, is the world's leading producer of methamphetamine as production has shifted to ya ba and crystalline methamphetamine, including for export to the United States and across East and Southeast Asia and the Pacific.

Concerning the accelerating synthetic drug production in the region, the Cantonese Chinese syndicate Sam Gor, also known as The Company, is understood to be the main international crime syndicate responsible for this shift. It is made up of members of five different triads. Sam Gor is primarily involved in drug trafficking, earning at least $8 billion per year. Sam Gor is alleged to control 40% of the Asia-Pacific methamphetamine market, while also trafficking heroin and ketamine. The organization is active in a variety of countries, including Myanmar, Thailand, New Zealand, Australia, Japan, China, and Taiwan. Sam Gor previously produced meth in Southern China and is now believed to manufacture mainly in the Golden Triangle, specifically Shan State, Myanmar, responsible for much of the massive surge of crystal meth in circa 2019. The group is understood to be headed by Tse Chi Lop, a gangster born in Guangzhou, China who also holds a Canadian passport.

Liu Zhaohua was another individual involved in the production and trafficking of methamphetamine until his arrest in 2005. It was estimated over 18 tonnes of methamphetamine were produced under his watch.

== Legal status ==
The production, distribution, sale, and possession of methamphetamine is restricted or illegal in many jurisdictions. In some jurisdictions, it is legally available as a prescription medication. Methamphetamine has been placed in schedule II of the United Nations Convention on Psychotropic Substances treaty, indicating that it has limited medical use.

== Research ==
Animal models have shown that low-dose methamphetamine improves cognitive and behavioural functioning following TBI (traumatic brain injury). This is in contrast to high, repeated doses which cause neurotoxicity. These models demonstrate that low-dose methamphetamine increases neurogenesis and reduces apoptosis in the dentate gyrus of the hippocampus following TBI. It has also been found that TBI patients testing positive for methamphetamine at the time of emergency department admission have lower rates of mortality.

It has been suggested, based on animal research, that calcitriol, the active metabolite of vitamin D, can provide significant protection against the DA- and 5-HT-depleting effects of neurotoxic doses of methamphetamine. Protection against methamphetamine-induced neurotoxicity has also been observed following administration of ascorbic acid (vitamin C), cobalamin (vitamin B_{12}), and vitamin E.

== See also ==
- Breaking Bad – TV drama series centered on illicit methamphetamine synthesis
- Drug checking – Harm reduction technique
- Faces of Meth – Drug prevention project
- Famprofazone – Non-steroidal anti-inflammatory drug yielding methamphetamine as a major metabolite
- Harm reduction – Public health policies which lessen negative aspects of problematic activities
- Methamphetamine and Native Americans
- Methamphetamine in Australia
- Methamphetamine in Bangladesh – Illegal mix of methamphetamine and caffeine
- Methamphetamine in the Philippines
- Methamphetamine in the United States
- Montana Meth Project – Montana-based organization aiming to reduce meth use among teenagers
- Recreational drug use – Use of drugs with the primary intention to alter the state of consciousness
- Rolling meth lab – A transportable laboratory that is used to illegally produce methamphetamine
- Ya ba – Southeast Asian tablets containing a mixture of methamphetamine and caffeine
