= Meth mouth =

Tooth decay caused by methamphetamine use

- The mouth of a person with symptoms similar to those caused by long-term use of methamphetamine

Meth mouth is a colloquial term used to describe severe tooth decay and tooth loss as well as tooth fracture, dental erosion, and other oral problems that are often correlated with extended use of the drug methamphetamine. The condition is thought to be caused by a combination of side effects of the drug (clenching and grinding of teeth, dry mouth) and lifestyle factors (infrequent oral hygiene, frequent consumption of sugary drinks, as well as neglecting regular dental cleanings and preventive care), which may be present in long-term users. However, the legitimacy of meth mouth as a unique condition has been questioned because of the similar effects of some other drugs on teeth. Images of diseased mouths are often used in anti-drug campaigns.

The condition is difficult to treat, and may involve fillings, fluoride to fight tooth decay and drugs that increase saliva for dry mouth, as well as oral hygiene instruction. It can be dangerous for active methamphetamine users to undergo dental surgery because of the cardiac problems that can result from the interaction of local anesthetic with the drug.

== Signs and symptoms ==
Methamphetamine (informally referred to as "meth") is a stimulant drug with a high potential for addiction in its recreational users. It incurs physical and psychological side effects that users find desirable. Other side effects (like bruxism and stimulant psychosis) can result in users neglecting their dental health, eventually leading to advanced tooth decay (caries) and gum infections. Further, a common side effect of stimulant drugs is xerostomia, which accelerates tooth decay.

As of 2012, methamphetamine is the most discussed illegal drug in dental literature for its extensive effect on users' dental health. The teeth of some methamphetamine users appear to be dark and extensively eroded. The epithet "meth mouth" is the result of these superficial presentations of advanced tooth decay and gum infection. Caries often occur in the cervical regions of teeth, where the tooth surface narrows at the junction of the crown and the root; decay is primarily centered on the buccal (cheek) side of the teeth, and on tooth surfaces that are adjacent to incisors and canines. Eventually, the coronal tooth area (near the crown) can be affected by the decay and erosion. The dental caries of meth mouth often progress slowly, perhaps because their advancement is hindered by intermittent hygienic practices. The decay can lead to tooth fractures and severe pain. In some cases, teeth are permanently damaged and must be removed. Along with malnutrition and weight loss, the dental effects of methamphetamine use contribute to the appearance of premature aging seen in some users.

Methamphetamine users sometimes experience soreness in the joint of the jaw and dental attrition (tooth wear) due to bruxism, a common side effect of stimulant drugs. This bruxism can occur continuously. Chronic use of the drug might also cause trismus, the inability to open the jaw.

The effects of meth mouth are similar to those of Sjögren's syndrome, an autoimmune disease that causes a lack of saliva, which results in tooth decay.

== Causes ==
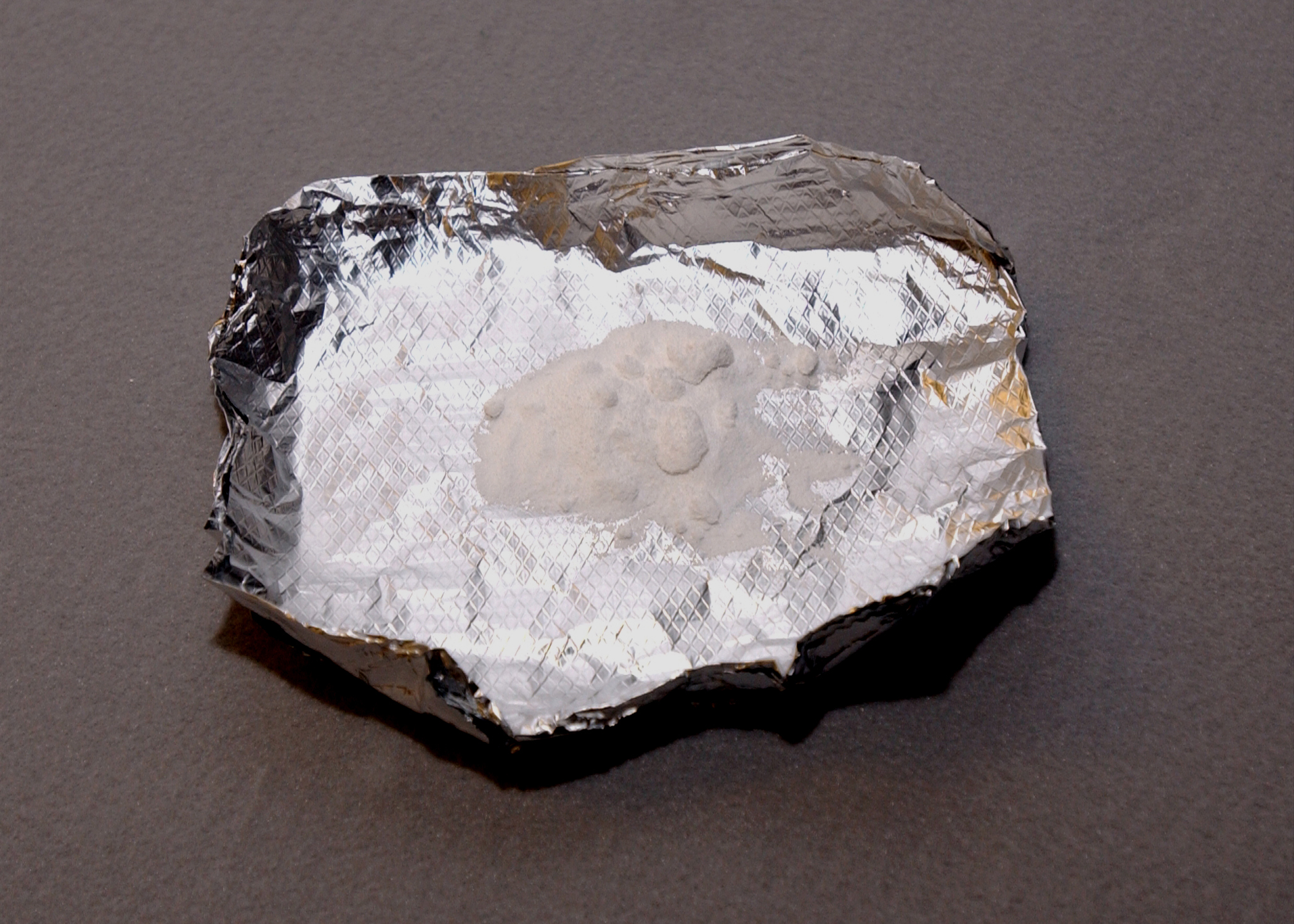
Powder methamphetamine on tin foil

The hypothesized causes of meth mouth are a combination of MA side effects and lifestyle factors which may be present in users:

- Dry mouth (xerostomia)
- Clenching and grinding of the teeth (bruxism)
- Infrequent oral hygiene
- Frequent consumption of sugary, fizzy drinks
- Caustic nature of methamphetamine

The dental effects of long-term methamphetamine use are often attributed to its effects on saliva. The reduction in saliva increases the likelihood of dental caries, enamel erosion, and periodontal disease. Although it is clear that use of the drug decreases saliva, the mechanism by which it does so is unclear. One theory is that the drug causes vasoconstriction (narrowing of the blood vessels) in salivary glands, decreasing salivary flow. This constriction is thought to be due to the activation of alpha-adrenergic receptors by both methamphetamine itself and norepinephrine, the levels of which are dramatically increased by methamphetamine use. These factors can be compounded by dehydration, which occurs in many methamphetamine users after drug-induced increases in metabolism. The characteristics of the saliva produced during use of the drug, which includes high protein content, may also contribute to the sensation of dry mouth.

Long-term methamphetamine use can cause parafunctional habits, routine actions of a body part that are different from their common use, which can result in tooth wear and exacerbate periodontal diseases. One such habit that may affect the development of meth mouth is bruxism, particularly as the drug's effects wane and stereotypy occurs, a phase that is often referred to as "tweaking". This bruxism may be due to a drug-induced increase in monoamines. Other behaviors of long-term methamphetamine users that may cause or accelerate the symptoms of meth mouth are the failure to pay attention to oral hygiene and excessive food intake during binges, especially sugary foods; the drug's users often report strong cravings for sugar and consume large amounts of high-sugar beverages. The altered mental state that accompanies methamphetamine use lasts longer than that of some other common drugs, increasing the amount of time the user engages in drug-induced behavior.

Hydrochloric acid is used in methamphetamine's manufacturing process, but academic reviews have not supported the idea that the acid contributes to dental decay. Speculation that oral consumption of the drug causes tooth decay by raising the acidity of users' mouths is also unsupported. Meth mouth is generally most severe in users who inject the drug, rather than those who smoke, ingest or inhale it.

== Treatment ==
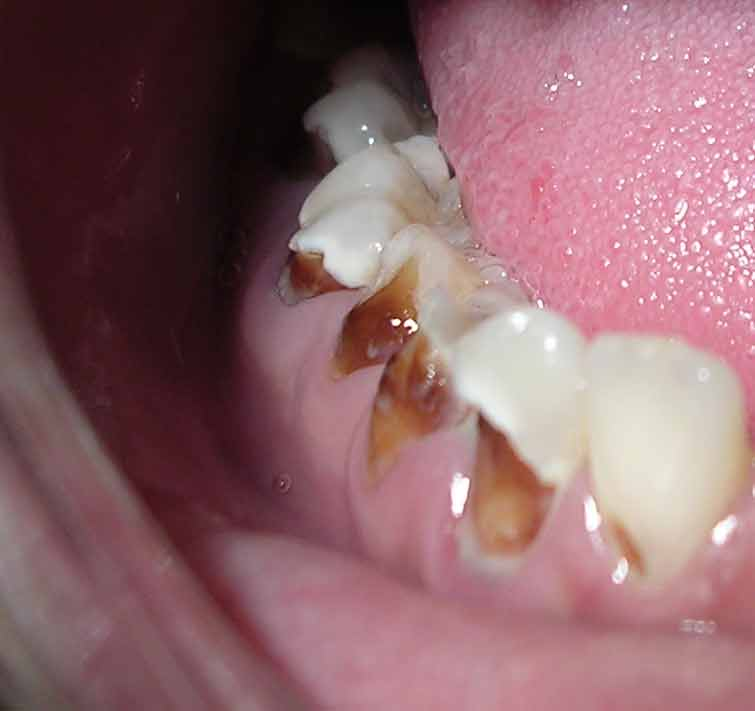
Rampant caries caused by methamphetamine abuse

The damaging effects of meth mouth on the teeth and gums for the most part are irreversible, although, if treated at an early stage, they can be dramatically reduced through the habitual use of common hygienic practices; Under normal circumstances, the user will not seek a remedy until the damage has already begun to take control causing severe mouth pain and general discomfort. Because many drug users lack the access to dental treatment, due to affordability and poverty, it is important to take medical precautions to prolong the lifespan of the mouth, and health in general. Those who are willing to seek dental treatment should seek professional advice as soon as possible if they are experiencing any painful symptoms relatable to meth mouth from abusing methamphetamine. Providing dental treatment to individuals who use methamphetamine can be dangerous, because the potential combination of local anesthetic and methamphetamine can cause serious heart problems. There is also an increased risk of serious side effects if opioid medications are used in the patient's treatment.

Treatment of meth mouth usually attempts to increase the flow of saliva, halt tooth decay, and encourage behavioral changes.

Toothpaste with fluoride is very important to the restoration of dental health. Prescription fluoride rinses can adequately treat the condition as well. Sialogogues, drugs that increase the amount of saliva in the mouth, can be used to treat dry mouth and protect against dental health problems. Pilocarpine and cevimeline are sialogogues approved by the Food and Drug Administration (FDA) to treat low salivation caused by Sjögren syndrome and may have the potential to effectively treat dry mouth caused by methamphetamine use.

== Uncertainty ==
There have not been any controlled studies on meth mouth, and several of its aspects are unclear. Although the condition has been popularized by media coverage and case reports, no systematic studies have been conducted to conclusively tie methamphetamine use to symptoms that are commonly described as meth mouth. There are few ties between dental scholars and those who study drug use, and it can be difficult for dental researchers to find methamphetamine users to study.

Whether the drug has a unique effect on dental health has been questioned by a few academics, who note that the long-term use of several other drugs sometimes causes dental problems. Several academic reviews have contradicted this perspective, affirming meth mouth's status as a discrete condition. In favor of its unique status, these reviews cite the differences between methamphetamine-caused caries and those that occur for other reasons, such as cocaine use, as well as the scope of the tooth decay found in some long-term methamphetamine users.

According to the American Dental Association, meth mouth "is probably caused by a combination of drug-induced psychological and physiological changes resulting in xerostomia (dry mouth), extended periods of poor oral hygiene, frequent consumption of high-calorie, carbonated beverages and bruxism (teeth grinding and clenching)". As dry mouth is also a common side effect of other stimulants, which are not known to contribute severe tooth decay, many researchers suggest that methamphetamine-associated tooth decay is more due to users' other choices. They suggest the side effect has been exaggerated and stylized to create a stereotype of current users as a deterrence for new ones.

== Society and culture ==
Although most methamphetamine users lived in Asian countries in the early 2000s, the use of the drug increased dramatically in other parts of the world in that decade. In areas where use of the drug has become common, meth mouth is often widespread. The condition is expensive to treat and has strained public health resources, prompting concerns among dental authorities in several countries about the burden of treatment.

Images of meth mouth are usually considered disturbing and have been used in anti-drug campaigns, even being placed on billboards. The condition is often mentioned in media coverage of methamphetamine, and it has been included in media portrayals of drug abuse in order to demonstrate the scope of the drug's effects or to provoke disgust in the audience. Opponents argue that the term is used to negatively stereotype methamphetamine users, and that it is falsely portrayed as inevitable or characteristic.

The drama series Breaking Bad, which centers around the production of crystal meth, features a number of minor characters who have meth mouth. The series creator Vince Gilligan has said one of his regrets about the series is that one of the lead characters, Jesse Pinkman (played by Aaron Paul), had perfect teeth because he felt this was unrealistic, given the amount of meth the character consumed.

== See also ==
- Faces of Meth

== Bibliography ==
Books

- Treadwell, Henry M.; Northbridge, Mary E.; Bethea, Traci N. (2007). "Building the Case for Oral Health Care for Prisoners". In Greifinger, Robert B. (ed.). Public Health Behind Bars: From Prisons to Communities. New York: Springer Science+Business Media. ISBN 978-0-387-71694-7.
- Karch, Steven B. (2008). Karch's Pathology of Drug Abuse (Fourth ed.). Boca Raton: CRC Press. ISBN 978-0-8493-7880-5.
- Littmann, Greg (2012). George Reish; David Koepsell; Robert Arp (eds.). Breaking Bad and Philosophy. Open Court Publishing. ISBN 978-0-8126-9764-3.
- Weisheit, Ralph; White, William L. (2009). Methamphetamine: Its History, Pharmacology, and Treatment. Center City, Minn: Hazelden Publishing. ISBN 978-1-59285-717-3.

Journals

- Winslow, Bradford; Voorhees, Kenton; Pehl, Katherine (2007). "Methamphetamine Abuse". American Family Physician. 76 (8): 1169–1174. PMID 17990840.
- Goodchild, Jason; Donaldson, Mark (2007). "Methamphetamine Abuse and Dentistry: A Review of the Literature and Presentation of a Clinical Case". Quintessence International. 38 (7): 583–590. PMID 17694215.
- Hamamoto, D. T.; Rhodus, N. L. (2009). "Methamphetamine Abuse and Dentistry". Oral Diseases. 15 (1): 27–37. doi:10.1111/j.1601-0825.2008.01459.x. PMID 18992021.
- Hussain, Fahmida; Frare, Robert; Berrios, Karen (2012). "Drug Abuse Identification and Pain Management in Dental Patients: A Case Study and Literature Review". General Dentistry. 60 (4): 334–345. PMID 22782046.
- Rusyniak, Daniel (2011). "Neurologic Manifestations of Chronic Methamphetamine Abuse". Neurologic Clinics. 29 (3): 641–655. doi:10.1016/j.ncl.2011.05.004. PMC 3148451. PMID 21803215.
- Saini, Tarnjit; Edwardsa, Paul; Kimmesa, Nicole; Carrolla, Lucinda; Shanera, John; Dowdb, Frank (2005). "Etiology of Xerostomia and Dental Caries among Methamphetamine Abusers". Oral Health & Preventative Dentistry. 3 (3): 189–195. PMID 16355653.
- Shetty, Vivek; Mooney, Larissa; Zigler, Corwin; Belin, Thomas; Murphy, Debra; Rawson, Richard (2010). "The Relationship Between Methamphetamine Use and Increased Dental Disease". The Journal of the American Dental Association. 141 (3): 307–318. doi:10.14219/jada.archive.2010.0165. PMC 2947197. PMID 20194387.

Newspapers

- "The Tooth on Drugs". Herald Sun. July 30, 2007.
- Billen, Andrew (August 10, 2009). "Louis Theroux: The City Addicted to Crystal Meth". The Times.
- Davey, Monica (June 11, 2005). "Grisly Effect of One Drug: 'Meth Mouth'". The New York Times.
- Kinkead, Lucinda Dillon; Romboy, Dennis (June 12, 2005). "Meth Mouth: Ugly Legacy of Drug is Taxing Utah Jail, Prison Medical Budgets". Deseret News. Archived from the original on August 18, 2010.
- Naidoo, Yugendree (August 3, 2009). "Dentists Face Tik Toothache". West Cape News.
- Verini, James (May 1, 2009). "Meth Mouth: Tom Siebel's Brash Anti-Crystal Campaign". Fast Company.
