= Montana Meth Project =

American anti-drug non-profit organization

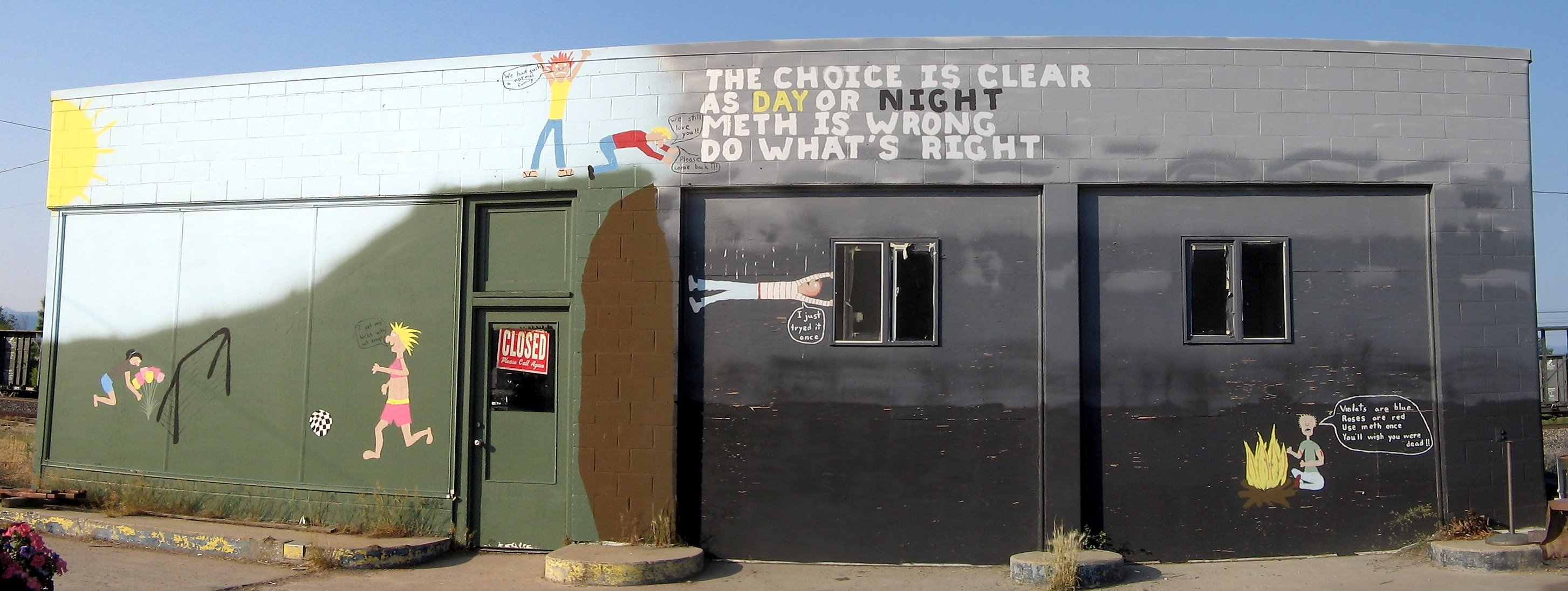
Community-painted anti-meth mural in Drummond, Montana

The Montana Meth Project (MMP) is a Montana-based non-profit organization founded by businessman Thomas Siebel which seeks to reduce methamphetamine use, particularly among teenagers. The organizations main approach includes television, radio, print, and internet public service announcements that graphically depict the negative consequences of methamphetamine use. Common elements are the deterioration of health and living conditions, amphetamine psychosis, moral compromise, and regret. As of 2010, the Meth Project has expanded its media campaign into seven additional states. In March 13, 2013, the Montana Meth Project joined the Partnership for Drug-Free Kids.

== Efficacy ==
The ad campaign received mixed analysis on its effectiveness. Using data from the Youth Risk Behavior Surveys, a 2015 analysis found that "when accounting for a preexisting downward trend in meth use, [Montana Meth Project's] effects on meth use are statistically indistinguishable from zero."

A study was published in the Journal of Marketing Research validating the effectiveness of the Meth Project's advertising in deterring substance abuse. The researchers tested the effectiveness of several advertisements—including the Meth Project's—and found that ads that relied on fear alone to convey their message did not lead to immediate changes in attitudes or behavior. However, according to the study, the Meth Project ads that incorporated an element of “disgust,” such as rotting teeth, skin sores or infections, did compel viewers to “undertake distancing behaviors,” such as deciding not to use illegal drugs.

The study concludes that, "notably, the disgust and fear appeal condition in this study used an actual advertisement from the Montana Meth Project, a nationally recognized, award-winning program that uses high-impact advertising to reduce methamphetamine use . . . It was only the disgust-inducing fear appeal [the Meth Project ad] that significantly reduced future drug use, making it more effective in terms of persuasion and compliance.”

While the effectiveness of the campaign at reducing methamphetamine use is disputed, in 2010, the Meth Project was named the third most effective philanthropy in the world, up from #5 in 2009 on Barron's yearly rankings. In its efforts to effectively reach teens and change attitudes and behaviors toward meth, the MMP regularly conducts focus group research to refine its messaging and better understand how to connect with the state's youth. HBO has also partnered with the MMP on a documentary as part of its Addiction series.

Two surveys have been conducted that have investigated methamphetamine use amongst teenagers in Montana before and after the launch of the Meth Project's ads. The first survey is the CDC's youth risk behavior survey (YBRS). The YRBS data are listed below.

YRBS Data - Percentage of Montana Teens who have ever used meth:

1999	2001	2003	2005	2007	2009
13.5%	12.6%	9.3%	8.3%	4.6%	3.1%

The YRBS data indicates that teenage meth use in Montana has declined since the Meth Project's ad campaign was launched in 2005. The absolute drop in meth use since the ad campaign was introduced in 2005 is 5.2% - larger than any prior four-year period. However, the YRBS data also shows that meth use was dropping for at least 6 years prior to the launch of the ad campaign.

The other survey of teen meth use has been conducted by the Meth Project. The data from the Meth Project's survey are listed below.

2005	2006	2007	2008
2%	6%	4%	3%

According to the MMP's figures, before the ad campaign (2005), only 2% of teenagers had ever used meth. Six months after the launch of the ad campaign (2006), 6% reported using meth. In contrast to the YRBS data, the MMP's figures indicate that the percentage of teenagers using meth in Montana increased following the launch of the ad campaign. By 2008, 3% of teenagers reported using meth, still more than before the ad campaign commenced. However, the 2005 and 2006 MMP figures were based on un-weighted data that was tabulated from a total of 329 and 419 survey participants, respectively. In contrast, the 2007 and 2008 MMP data was weighted and compiled from 2,335 and 2,334 participants, respectively.

In press materials, the Meth Project commonly cites YRBS figure of a 45% decrease in meth use between 2005 and 2007. However the absolute drop for the period was 3.7%. In contrast, the Meth Project's own data for the same period show a 2% absolute increase in meth use, or a 100% relative increase. The 2009 YRBS results for Montana showed meth use declining an additional 32% to 3.1%, or a total reduction of 62%.

According to a 2007 Montana State Office of Public Instruction Report, since the inception of the program in 2005, there has also been a 72% relative decrease in adult methamphetamine use, and a 62% relative decline in methamphetamine-related crimes. Additionally, the percentage of teenagers who are aware of meth's dangers increased from 25% to 93%, and Montana's ranking among U.S. states in meth abuse fell from #5 to #39.

=== Office of National Drug Control Policy report ===
In November 2006, the Office of National Drug Control Policy (ONDCP) published a report, Pushing Back Against Meth: A Progress Report on the Fight, highlighting the impact of recently enacted State and Federal laws, such as the Combat Methamphetamine Epidemic Act (CMEA) of 2005, that restricted transactions for the over the counter drugs that can be used to manufacture methamphetamine. Based on the results of Quest Diagnostics' preliminary review of workplace drug tests conducted during the first five months of 2006, the nationwide adult usage of meth declined by 12% when compared to the same period in 2005. "Montana’s methamphetamine precursor law went into effect July 1, 2005. The Montana law is stricter than the CMEA in several important respects." Montana's workplace drug testing results showed a 69.4% decrease in positive tests for amphetamine. Montana's Attorney General and the MMP attribute Montana's decrease in adult meth usage to the MMP. However, the ONDCP reported: "The primary reason for this positive trend is the enactment of various State laws...which implemented restrictions on transactions involving products containing certain chemicals (primarily, ephedrine and pseudoephedrine) that can be used to make methamphetamine." However, the Attorney General countered, "The Montana Meth Project’s theoretical framework is based upon the prevention principles that individuals who believe that the use of a particular drug involves risk or harm and/or who disapprove of its use are less likely to use that drug. As seen in last year’s report, both the Montana Prevention Needs Assessment and the Meth Use & Attitudes Survey show that Montana teens perceive a much greater risk in trying meth than do their counterparts nationally. Since 2005, the perception of specific negative effects resulting from meth use has changed. Among teens, risks such as stealing, lack of attention to personal hygiene, and tooth decay increased significantly (11%, 7.5%, and 19% respectively). In this time, societal disapproval of meth use has also greatly increased in the state, with teens (87%), young adults (83%) and parents (97%) now voicing “strong” disapproval of trying meth even once or twice. Perhaps most importantly, parent-child discussions about the dangers posed by meth use have increased in number and frequency."

A critical review of the Montana Meth Project's advertising campaign was published in the peer-review journal Prevention Science in December 2008. The review examined the Meth Project's statistical methodology and data reporting. The review found that the Meth Project had selectively reported their research findings, focusing on unrepresentative positive findings and ignoring data suggesting that the campaign may be associated with harmful outcomes. The review found that the Meth Project's data suggests that exposure to the graphic ads may lead to an increase in the percentage of teenagers who believe that taking meth is socially acceptable and not dangerous. Such 'boomerang' effects in response to persuasive, graphic ads are not uncommon, and are predicted by the theory of psychological reactance.

The review found that the selective reporting of results by the Meth Project has led the media, politicians and the public to form distorted and inaccurate beliefs about the campaign's effectiveness. The public believes that the ad campaign is far more effective than the Meth Project's research findings indicate. The main recommendation of the review was that public funding and additional roll-outs of the program should cease until its effectiveness can be scientifically examined. The review concluded: "Politicians, the media, and prevention researchers also need to ensure that in future they critically evaluate any research released by the MMP, rather than assuming the organization’s press releases (and reports) are presenting data in a fair and balanced way. It is recommended that any future reports documenting the results of MMP’s use and attitudes surveys include complete statistical analyses for every question in the survey. This is because researchers and policymakers making decisions about MMP-style graphic advertising campaigns need access to all evidence, rather than a subset of findings that portray the MMP in a positive light.”

== Government funding and expansion ==
Many in the Montana state legislature hailed the project as a success, and moved to fund the previously privately funded project with tax dollars. The move to provide public funding for the Meth Project was opposed by some legislators and drug prevention and treatment professionals, who asserted that the Meth Project's effectiveness is unproven and that research shows that these types of media campaigns are ineffective. However, the Bush administration praised the MMP as a "model for the nation." As of 2009, the campaign has expanded to include the Arizona Meth Project, Idaho Meth Project, Illinois Meth Project, Wyoming Meth Project, Colorado Meth Project, and Hawaii Meth Project. The Georgia Meth Project was founded in 2009 with a planned launch in early 2010.

The governor of Montana, Brian Schweitzer, announced that he would review public funding for the Meth Project in early 2009, as a result of a critical review of the Meth Project published in an academic journal, which called for public funding of the Meth Project to be put on hold. In February 2009, the Montana legislature came under increased pressure to withdraw funding to the Meth Project after an analysis of Meth Project tax forms revealed that the Project spends large amounts of money on staff salaries and website costs. In May 2009, Schweitzer chose not to support an additional $500,000 proposed by state legislators for 2009–10, "given the economically difficult times," and stated that the Project would have to become "self-supporting" in the future. The Project was granted $500,000 for the next budget period.

== March Against Meth ==
The March Against Meth was a demonstration and rally in Helena, Montana on February 16, 2009. Over 2,300 students of all ages from across Montana marched from Helena High School to the Capitol where they delivered over 55,000 signatures of Montanans requesting funding from the Montana legislature for the project. It was the largest youth demonstration in Montana's history. The Meth Project and its supporters requested $2 million in state funding to continue to bring the "Not Even Once" message to Montana teens.

The March was criticized by some Montanans, who suggested some teenagers were lured to attend due to free giveaways of iPods and the presence of a blackhawk helicopter. The Montana media were also criticized for preannouncing the rally as a success before it had even taken place.

== Paint the State ==
Paint the State is a public art competition initiated by The Meth Project. The large-scale community action program, launched in Montana and Idaho in 2010, empowers teenagers to create artwork with a strong anti-Meth message that is clearly visible to the general public. Contestants are asked to use the Meth Project's “Meth: Not Even Once” tagline, logo or any other anti-Meth theme, to create art of any style and medium. The current 2010 campaigns are modeled after Montana's largely successful Paint the State 2006 contest, which inspired art from every county in the state for a total of over 650 works of art. The overwhelming response made Paint the State the largest public art contest in history. Entries in 2006 featured 12 languages, 47 art vehicles, 78 T-shirts, over 380 banners and flags and even a painted sheep.

== See also ==
- Faces of Meth
