= Faces of Meth =

Drug prevention project run by the Multnomah County Sheriff's Office in Oregon, U.S.

Location of Multnomah County, Oregon

Faces of Meth was a drug prevention project, run by the Multnomah County Sheriff's Office in the U.S. state of Oregon. The project uses mug shots of repeat offenders to demonstrate the harmful and damaging effects of methamphetamine on its users. In 2021, the Oregon Legislative Assembly passed House Bill 3273, which prohibited the release of mug shots except in limited scenarios. This effectively ended the program.

The images were originally used in educational slideshows and video presentations delivered to students in Oregon high schools. This Faces of Meth drug prevention strategy has since become popular across the United States.

== Background ==
Steve Suo and Joseph Rose, staff writers for The Oregonian, began an investigation into the methamphetamine epidemic taking place on the West Coast of the United States in late 2002. Oregon was especially hit hard by methamphetamine at the time, with more addicts per capita than any other state. Suo's story was published in October 2004 as "Unnecessary Epidemic", a five-part investigative series. Around the same time, deputy Bret King was working at the Multnomah County Detention Center when he witnessed a 20-year-old woman experience amphetamine psychosis in her cell. After glancing at her mug shot and seeing how the drug had physically changed her appearance, King and his co-workers began to collect images of people charged with crimes related to methamphetamine addiction to document the change in physical appearance over time due to the use of the drug. eventually creating "the faces of meth", a slideshow of "the most extreme faces" altered by the devastating effects of meth use.

Two months later, on December 28, 2004, Rose published "Faces of Meth", the first to highlight the before and after photos King had collected. Rose's article discussed the development of King's drug prevention project and the physiological effects of methamphetamine on the human body. In May 2005, several of King's images were published as a public service poster in a partnership between The Oregonian and the Multnomah County Sheriff's Office. King and the Faces of Meth project appeared on NBC Nightly News in August of that same year. In February 2006, the public affairs television program Frontline aired "The Meth Epidemic", a documentary produced in association with The Oregonian. The Frontline episode featured King and showed images from the Faces of Meth project in the first segment, "Uncovering Meth's History and Spread".

== Images and videos ==
The Faces of Meth project uses before and after mug shots of arrestees to demonstrate the harmful effects of using methamphetamine. The images often depict signs of premature aging, facial scarring from picking scabs, and advanced tooth decay, commonly referred to as meth mouth. The Multnomah County Sheriff's Office has also published several slideshows and videos. Faces of Meth was originally released in 2005 on a CD containing 59 images and a PowerPoint presentation for educating youths about the dangers of methamphetamine. This public education strategy, intended to discourage drug use, has since become popular across the United States. According to Bret King, the images were effective in communicating the message of the drug prevention project:

What I've observed when kids watch my program is they become pretty uncomfortable ... People cover up their faces. They can't look ... They feel sick to their stomach. But I think the most visible thing is their facial expression or the verbal utterances they make – gasps in the audience ... I want that shock value to be there. I want to make an impact that lasts with these people. I want them to not forget what they've seen.

In 2009, the Multnomah County Sheriff's Office released From Drugs to Mugs, a new 48-minute documentary and expanded update of the Faces of Meth drug prevention strategy. The video "illustrates the dangers and potential outcomes of the decision to experiment with drugs" using interviews with inmates arrested for drug-related crimes and testimony from the people who work with them in the judicial system. Questions in the interview were based on a 2008 survey of almost 500 high school students who were asked about the most important elements in their decision to use or abstain from using drugs.

== Reaction ==
Reactions to the project were positive, but some concerns were raised about privacy law. Max Margolis of Oregon Partnership's YouthLink Program described the shocking imagery as an "honest tactic", because "the damage to the body, the rapid degeneration – those are realities of the drug." Douglas J. Edwards, Editor-in-Chief of Behavioral Healthcare, criticized the project's methods, stating that permission was not obtained from the subjects, and that the identities of the subjects could have been concealed using black bars to block the eyes. According to the Faces of Meth project, all of the mug shots they use are public records and do not require permission.

Researchers Travis Linnemann and Tyler Wall have described Faces of Meth as a racial project where hierarchies of whiteness and white social position are reproduced and maintained. The effectiveness of such media in curtailing methamphetamine use has also been questioned. According to a research paper published in the International Journal of Drug Policy which examined both Faces of Meth and the Montana Meth Project, despite "claims of success and substantial public and private funding, these programs have received limited empirical evaluations ... The ineffectiveness of anti-drug programs such as these has been attributed to their emphasis on fear and disgust ... By emphasizing the extreme physical and mental harm of drug use these campaigns allow users to frame the ads as inauthentic. For example, youth surveyed about their perceptions of anti-methamphetamine campaigns suggest that while they held unfavourable attitudes towards methamphetamine as a result of the ads, they also believed the ads to be exaggerated and unreliable, thereby weakening their potential useful impacts".

== See also ==
- Substance dependence
- Physical dependence
- Substance abuse
- The Drunkard's Progress, pro-temperance lithograph
