= Joe Rose =

Joe Rose may refer to:

- Joe Rose (American football) (born 1957), American football player
- Joe Rose (American actor), actor best known for his part in Scrubs
- Joe Rose (Konkani actor) (born 1946), Indian actor, singer, composer, playwright, and theatre director
- Joe Rose (activist) (died 1989), Canadian gay rights activist, killed by gay bashers in 1989
- Joe Rose, fictional character in Ian McEwan's novel Enduring Love and its subsequent film adaptation

== See also ==
- Joseph Rose (disambiguation)
