= Methamphetamine in Bangladesh =

Illegal mix of methamphetamine and caffeine

Methamphetamine in Bangladesh is an illegal substance that is often consumed in the form of Yaba. Yaba is a drug made by combining methamphetamine and caffeine. They are sold as colorful pills. There are three forms of Yaba in Bangladesh, they are R-7, Controller, and Champa.

== History ==
According to the United Nations Office on Drugs and Crime, Myanmar is believed to be the main origin point of Yaba in South-East Asia and the Mekong region including in Bangladesh. Drug gangs in Myanmar shifted from Heroin to Methamphetamine manufacturing in the late 1990s. Bangladesh shares a 250 kilometres (160 mi) border with Myanmar. Cooperation between Border Guards Bangladesh and Myanmar Border Guard Police is limited, according to Border Guards Bangladesh the Border Guard Police do not receive nine out of ten of their calls. The majority of drugs entered Bangladesh through the border at Teknaf. The Usage of Yaba started to become popular in Bangladesh from 2006. In 2010, law enforcement seized 84 thousand yaba pills in Bangladesh, which rose to 29.5 million pills seized in 2016.

Bangladesh government officials estimated that the trade in Yaba was worth US$3 billion in 2016. According to the Department of Narcotic Control the main consumers of the drugs are students. According to the Director General of the Narcotics Control Board, Md Jamal Uddin Ahmed, there are 7 million drug addicts in Bangladesh of whom 5 million are addicted to Yaba. The trade in Yaba increased during the Rohingya refugee crises, the influx of Rohingya refugees from Myanmar also increases the influx of Yaba into Bangladesh. Yaba bought in Myanmar for 40 cents a pill can be sold for 3-4 dollars in Dhaka, Bangladesh. In May 2018, Bangladesh launched a massive anti-narcotics crackdown that was modeled on the Philippines drug crackdown in which more than 211 people were killed in shootouts with law enforcement. Security services Arrested hundreds of suspects in a span of few days. The crackdown has been criticised by Human Rights Watch and The Daily Star for alleged extrajudicial killings and human rights abuses by law enforcement.

== Legislation ==
The Department of Narcotic Control is the main government agency responsible for the regulation of drugs in Bangladesh. According to the Department of Narcotic Control, the government of Bangladesh maintains 12 drug rehabilitation centres. The Narcotics Control Act 2018 is one of the laws that regulate narcotics in Bangladesh. In 2017, Bangladesh banned the import of pseudoephedrine, a component of cold medicine that is used to manufacture amphetamines.

== See also ==
- 2018–2019 Bangladesh drug war
