= Use of drugs in warfare =

Use of mind-altering substances in warfare has included drugs used for both relaxation and stimulation. Historically, drug use was often sanctioned and encouraged by militaries through including alcohol and tobacco in troop rations. Stimulants like cocaine and amphetamines were widely used in both World Wars to increase alertness and suppress appetite. Drug use can negatively affect combat readiness and reduce the performance of troops. Drug use also poses additional expenses to the health care systems of militaries.

== Drugs ==
(In alphabetical order)

=== Alcohol ===
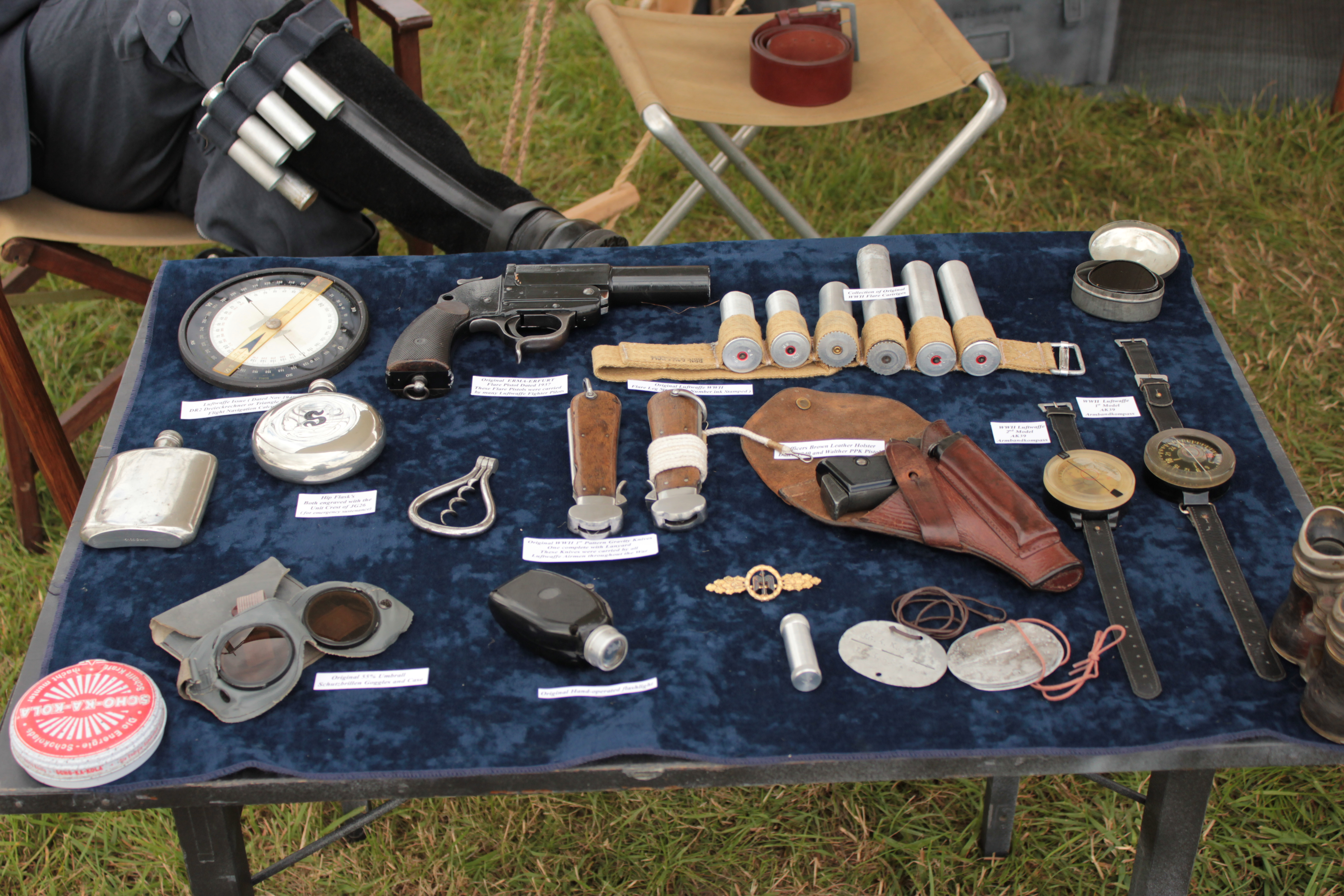
Two hip flasks, located in the left-center, are featured in the military equipment used as emergency sustenance by the Luftwaffe, which was the air force of Nazi Germany during World War II.

Alcohol has a long association of military use, and has been called "liquid courage" for its role in preparing troops for battle. It has also been used to anaesthetize injured soldiers, celebrate military victories, and cope with the emotions of defeat.

Military and veteran populations face significant challenges in addressing the co-occurrence of PTSD and alcohol use disorder. While existing interventions show promise, more research is needed to evaluate their effectiveness for this specific population, and new tailored interventions should be developed and evaluated to better meet their unique needs.

Reports from the Russian invasion of Ukraine in 2022 and since suggested that Russian soldiers are drinking significant amount of alcohol (as well as consuming harder drugs), which increases their losses. Some reports suggest that on occasion, alcohol and drugs have been provided to the lower quality troops by their commanders, in order to facilitate their use as expendable cannon fodder.

=== Amphetamines ===
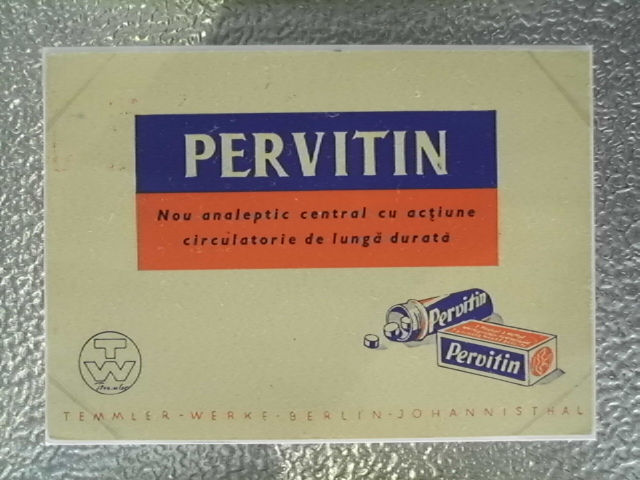
Pervitin, an amphetamine used in World War II

Amphetamines were given to troops to increase alertness. They had the added benefits of reducing appetites and fatigue. Nazi Germany, in particular, embraced amphetamines during World War II. From April to July 1940, German service members on the Western Front received more than 35 million methamphetamine pills. German troops would go as many as three days without sleep during the invasion of France. In contrast, Britain distributed 72 million amphetamine tablets during the entire war.

A 2023 report by a British military think tank cited evidence that the Russian military had been giving amphetamines, most likely in liquid form, to its soldiers during the Russian invasion of Ukraine.

=== Anabolic steroids ===
Although the usage of anabolic steroids is illegal in the United States military, their usage among service members has increased in the 21st Century, particularly among the special forces. Because anabolic steroids increase muscle mass, boost physical endurance, and speed up recovery from injury, they are used by service members to meet the physical demands of their duties.

An anonymous survey of US Army Rangers in 2007 found that a quarter of those surveyed admitted to using anabolic steroids and other performance enhancing drugs. The abuse of anabolic steroids can cause heart attacks, strokes, tumors in the liver, renal failure, and psychiatric episodes.

Following the death of a sailor during SEAL training in 2022, the navy opened an investigation into the program and discovered that sailors were using anabolic steroids to pass the course and that their usage was tacitly endorsed by instructors. From February 2022 to March 2023, the Navy screened candidates for SEAL training and found elevated testosterone levels in 74 out of 434 candidates with 3 of them testing positive for specific anabolic substances and the other 71 dropping from the program before follow-up testing could be done. As a result of these findings, the navy recommended more stringent drug testing and three commanding officers were pulled from their jobs at the US Navy Special Warfare Center. In September 2023, the United States Navy announced that they would begin to randomly test SEALs forcewide for performance enhancing drugs beginning on November 1.. Also under the new administration «taking testosterone for non-medical reasons, like artificial muscle enhancement without a doctor's prescription, is strictly prohibited in the military».

=== Caffeine ===
Military use has contributed to the rise of caffeine as the world's most popular drug. During the American Civil War, each Union troop received a coffee ration of 36 lb (16 kg) annually. World War I saw the dramatic rise of instant coffee: by the end of the conflict, daily production was 42,500 lb (19,300 kg), a 3,000% increase from pre-war production.

=== Cannabis ===
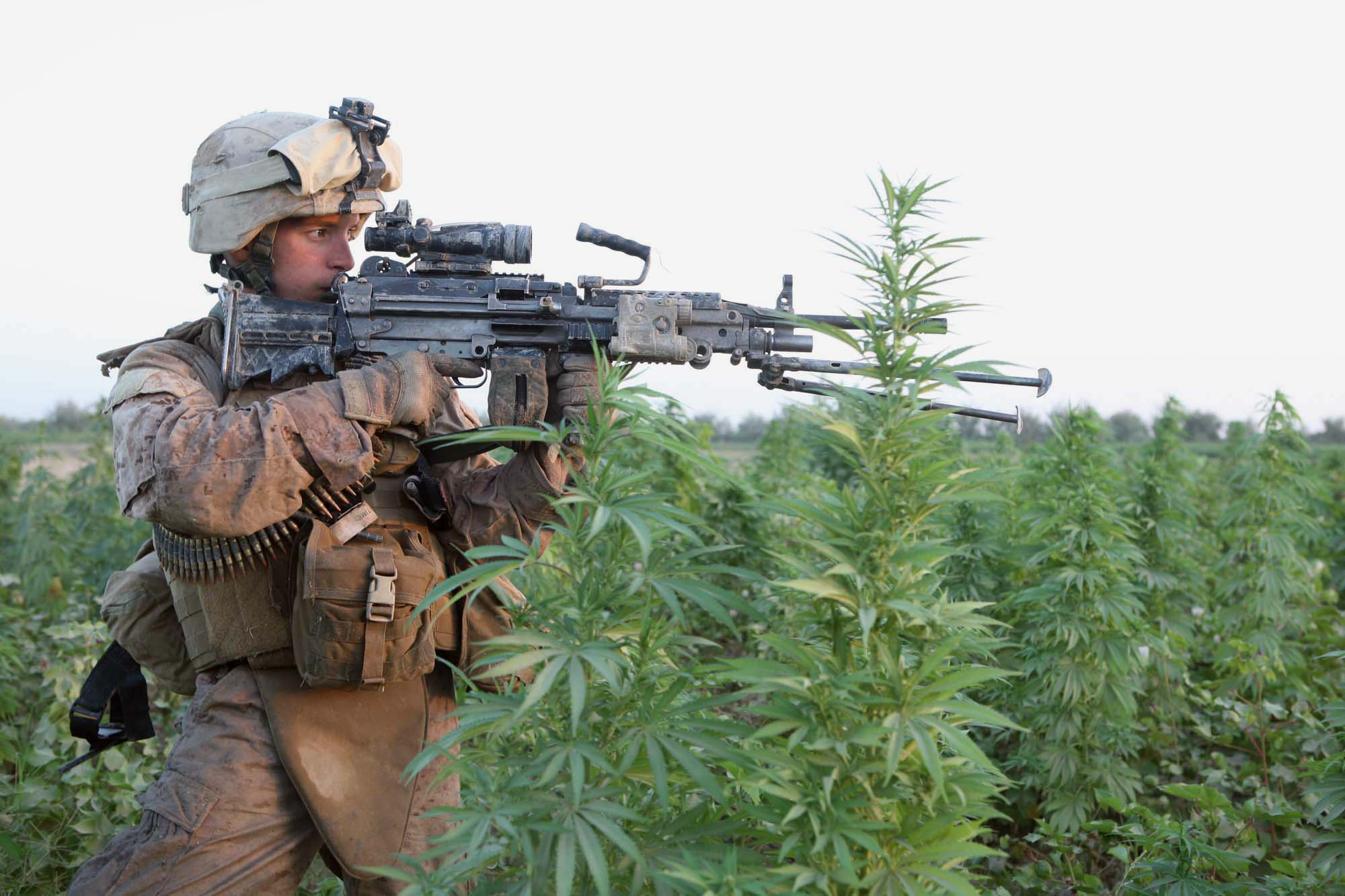
US Marine patrolling through a cannabis field in Afghanistan, 2010

In the 1910s, U.S. Army soldiers stationed in the Panama Canal Zone and in the Pancho Villa Expedition began using cannabis. Although the drug became illegal to use on bases, the U.S. Army Medical Corps prepared the 1933 report Mariajuana Smoking in Panama for the Panama Canal Department recommending no further restrictions. Between 1948 and 1975 the U.S. Army Chemical Corps also tested chemical agents, including cannabinoids considered for "nonlethal incapacitating agents," to volunteering soldiers in the Edgewood Arsenal human experiments. During the Vietnam War American soldiers frequently used cannabis. A 1971 U.S. Department of Defense report claimed that over half of U.S. Armed Forces personnel had used the drug. Beginning in 1968 this led to a political scandal in America that led the Nixon administration to more tightly restrict drug use in the military as part of the war on drugs, requiring all returning soldiers to pass a clinical urine test in Operation Golden Flow.

After the passage of the Cannabis Act legalizing the recreational use of the drug in Canada in 2018, its use became legal for most active-duty Canadian Armed Forces personnel with restrictions against its use eight hours before duty, 24 hours before handling a loaded weapon, and 28 days before entering an aircraft or submarine.

=== Cocaine ===
World War I saw the greatest use of cocaine amongst militaries. It was used for medical purposes and as a performance enhancer. At the time, it was not a controlled substance, and was readily available to troops. The British Army distributed cocaine-containing pills under Tabloid's brand name "Forced March", which were advertised to suppress appetite and increase endurance. In response to a moral panic about the effects of cocaine on society, the British Army Council passed an order in 1916 that prohibited the unauthorized sale of psychoactive drugs like cocaine and opiates to service members.

During the closing days of World War II, the German Army produced a combination of 5 mg of Cocaine, 3 mg of Methamphetamine and 5 mg of Oxycodone in a compound they named D-IX; the compound was reportedly tested on prisoners at the Sachsenhausen concentration camp and found out an individual who had consumed the compound could march 90 kilometers per day without rest while carrying 20 kilograms of equipment. The doctors and military authorities testing the compound were enthusiastic about the results but the war ended before the compound could be mass produced and distributed.

=== Fenethylline ===
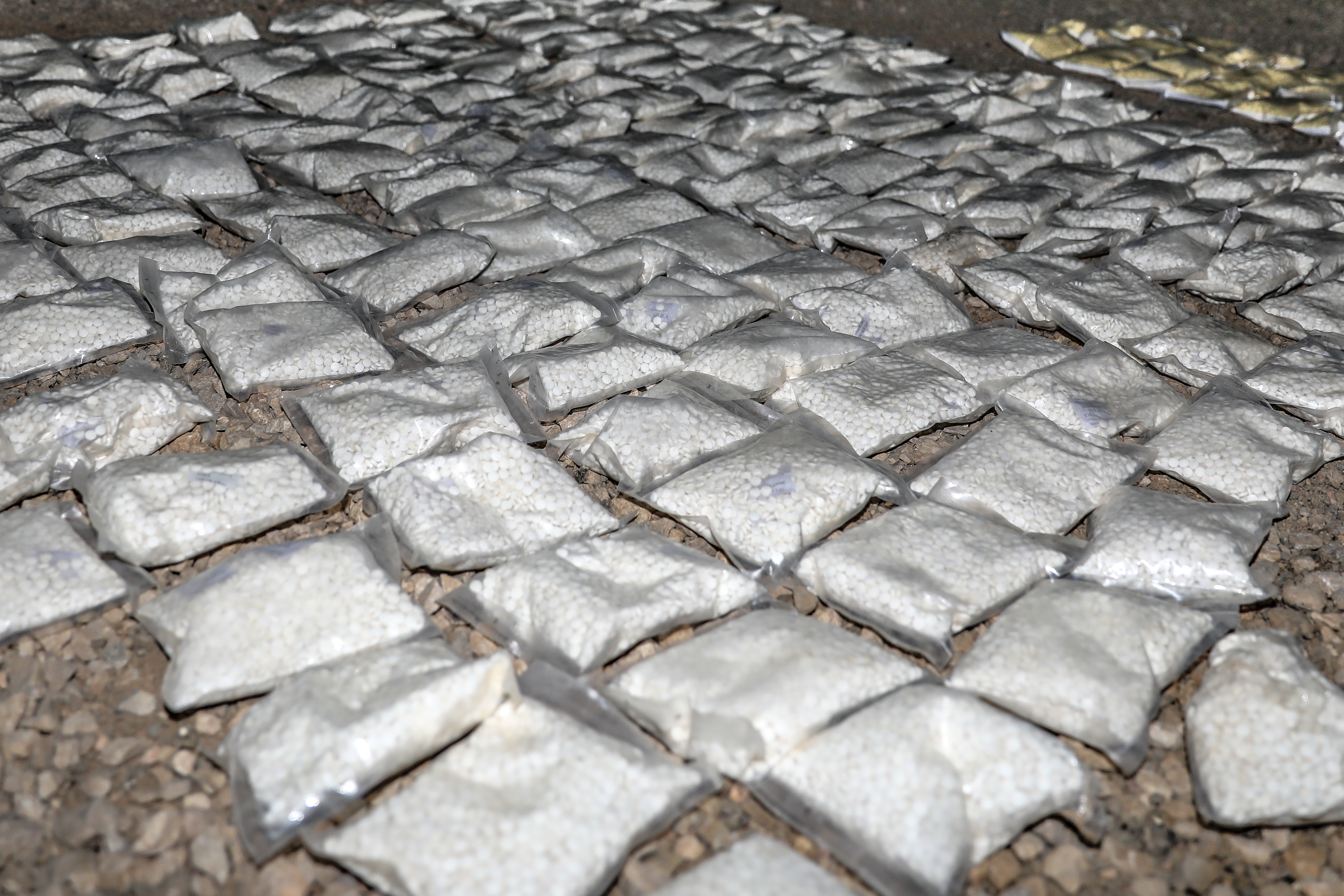
127 bags of fenethylline seized in Syria before being destroyed in May 2018

Fenetylline (INN), also known as fenethylline (BAN, USAN), is a codrug of amphetamine and theophylline that was marketed for use as a psychostimulant. The brand name "Captagon" is often used generically to describe illicitly produced fenetylline.

Fenethylline is used by ISIS in combat and smuggled for financing activities, and the drug has played a role in the Syrian civil war. The production and sale of Captagon have generated large revenues which were likely used to fund the purchase of weapons, and the drug is used itself as a stimulant by combatants. Poverty and international sanctions that limit legal exports are contributing factors. In May 2021, in an article published by The Guardian, Martin Chulov described the effects of fenethylline production in Syria on the economy as "a dirty business that is creating a near-narco-state".

In 2023, the UK ministry of foreign affairs estimated that Syria was responsible for about 80% of the global production of Captagon, which, according to then-secretary for the Middle East Tariq Ahmad, was exported from the port of Latakia with the assistance of the Syrian government under the command of Maher al-Assad. The same report issued by the UK government also suggested that "independent experts estimate [the Captagon trade market] could be worth up to $57 billion", and added that "it is worth approximately 3 times the combined trade of the Mexican cartels." Syria analyst and Century International fellow Sam Heller et al. challenged the credibility of the $57bn figure, which is ten times the Syrian annual budget and almost three times the country's GDP. A 2021 report by the New Lines Institute based on the retail value of annual captagon seizures estimated the drug's entire market to be worth at least $5.7bn.

Since the fall of the Assad regime in 2024 the new Syrian transitional government has ordered the cessation of the drug trade, and production has reportedly been reduced by 90%.

=== Hallucinogens ===
It has been speculated that the Norse berserkers' infamous battle rage had been induced voluntarily by the consumption of hallucinogenic mushrooms such as fly agaric (Amanita muscaria) and alkaloid-bearing plants such as black henbane (Hyoscyamus niger). An analysis of the symptoms caused by H. niger are also similar to the trance-like symptoms ascribed to the berserkers. While both A. muscaria and H. niger can result in delirious behavior, twitching, increased strength and redness of the face, the latter is also known to have pain-numbing properties.

The 16th century Spanish Franciscan scholar Bernardino de Sahagún wrote that the Chichimeca people of Mexico consumed the root of the peyote, a cactus, to stimulate themselves for battle. In his 1887 Historia del Nayarit (English: History of Nayarit), José Ortego also wrote that it was a favorite stimulant in warfare.

=== Khat ===
Khat may cause a feeling of invincibility and an increased tendency of violent behavior. As a result, its use is popular among combatants in countries where its use is traditional, such as Somalia and Yemen, and it is considered a contributing factor to violent conflicts in these countries.

=== Opiates ===
During the American Civil War, opiates were the most effective painkillers available to military surgeons. They were also used to treat diarrhea, muscle spasms of amputees, gangrene, dysentery, inflammation from gunshot wounds, and to sedate agitated troops. The Union Army requisitioned 5.3–10 million opium pills throughout the war, and a further 2.8 million ounces of opiate preparation (such as laudanum). Many veterans of the war had opiate addictions. Opiate addiction became known as "soldier's disease" and "army disease", though the precise effect of the American Civil War on the overall prevalence of opiate addiction is unknown. As a result of World War I, hundreds of thousands of soldiers developed severe opiate addictions, as morphine was commonly used to treat injuries.

=== Tobacco ===
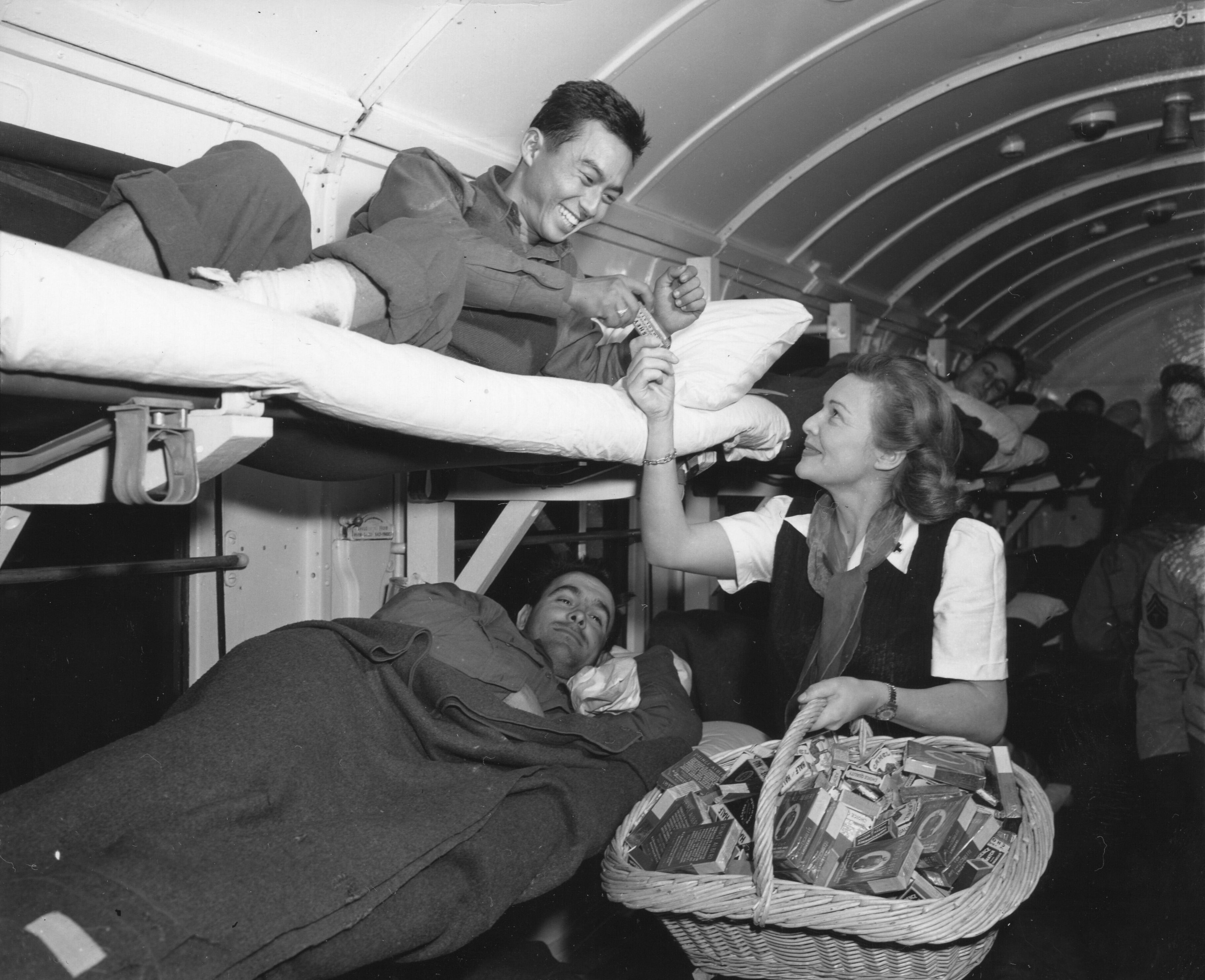
Madeleine Carroll handing out chocolate to soldier Hiroshi Suyao whilst carrying cigarettes

Tobacco has been viewed as essential to maintaining the morale of troops. Starting with the Thirty Years' War in 17th century Europe, major military encounters caused a surge in tobacco usage, mostly stemming from soldiers' use. During World War I, US Army General John J. Pershing noted, "You ask me what we need to win this war. I answer tobacco as much as bullets. Tobacco is as indispensable as the daily ration; we must have thousands of tons without delay." This sentiment was echoed by US Army General George Goethals, who noted tobacco was as important as food, and US medical officer William Gorgas who said that tobacco promoted contentment and morale, and the benefits outweighed any potential health risks. Such was the tobacco consumption of its troops that the US Government became the single-largest purchaser of cigarettes, including cigarettes in troops' rations and at discounted prices at post exchanges.

== Health and social impacts ==
=== Alcohol and tobacco ===
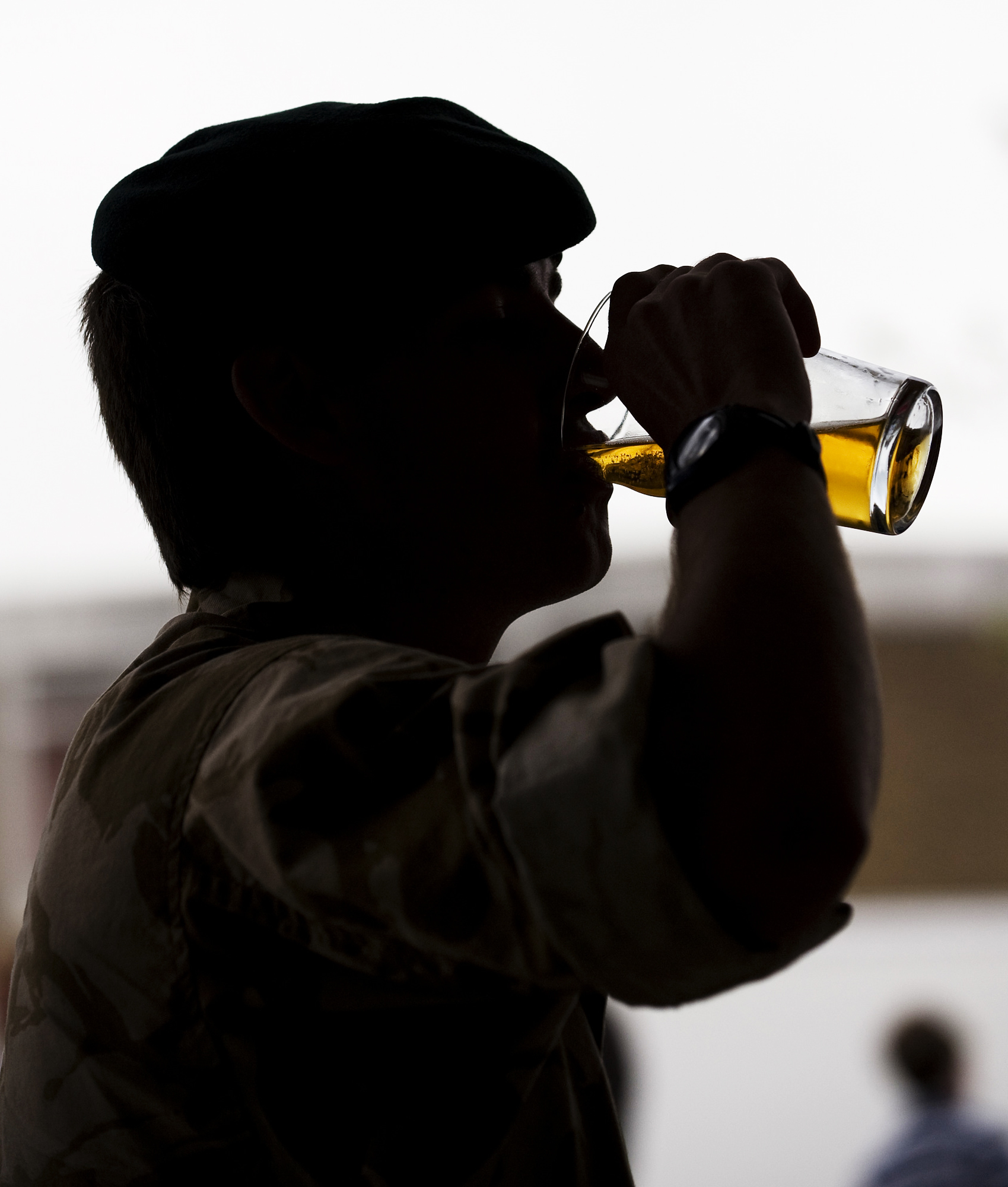
A British soldier drinks a pint of beer on returning from a deployment to Afghanistan.

Heavy drinking, tobacco use, and use of illegal drugs are common in the US military. Alcohol consumption in the US Military is higher than any other profession, according to CDC data from 2013–2017. American troops spend more days per year consuming alcohol than those in other professions (130 days), and additionally spend more days binge-drinking than those of other professions (41 days). Substance-use disorders were often attributed to moral failure, with the US Supreme Court ruling as recently as 1988 that the Department of Veterans Affairs did not have to pay benefits to alcoholics, as drinking was a result of "willful misconduct". Substance use can adversely affect combat readiness, with tobacco use negatively impacting troop performance and readiness. It can also be costly: In 2006, the cost of tobacco use to the Military Health System $564 million.

The Department of Defense Survey of Health Related Behaviors among Active Duty Military Personnel published that 47% of active duty members engage in binge drinking, with another 20% engaging in heavy drinking in the past 30 days. 11% of respondents engages in prescription drug misuse. Lastly, 30% reported to smoke tobacco, and 10% would smoke one or more packs of cigarettes daily.

After the service members come back from deployments, they go through a post deployment screening, screening them for alcohol, drugs, and mental health disorders. They have to repeat the screening again in a couple of weeks to make sure they are stable afterwards. There is no prolonged treatment necessary to the service members if their screenings come back clear. So, many of the service members disorders go unnoticed because they are able to hide their issues during the screening only, then carry on afterwards.

The amount of substance use disorders diagnosed in the military is significantly lower than any other mental health disorder. This is because many of the clinicians providing these screenings are also service members, and they are aware of the stigma and consequences of a SUD or AUD diagnosis in the military. This is also because of the lack of screening and clinicians available, and they usually only catch a SUD or AUD when the veteran is coming in for another mental illness, such as PTSD.

== See also ==
- Drug policy of Nazi Germany
- List of psychoactive drugs used by militaries
- Smoking in the United States military
- Go and no-go pills
