= Ya ba =

Tablets combining methamphetamine and caffeine

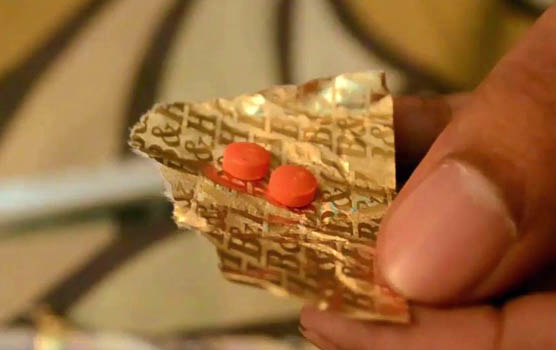
- Yaba tablets

Legal status
- Legal status: US: Schedule II

Ya ba (Thai: ยาบ้า, lit. 'mad drug') is a drug containing a mixture of methamphetamine and caffeine. It was formerly known as ya ma (Thai: ยาม้า; lit. 'horse drug'). Although it is illegal, it has considerable use in Thailand.

== Names ==
The drug has gone by various names across time and locations.

In Thailand, it went by ya khayan ('hard-working pill'), then as ya maa ('horse medicine'), and then ya ba ('crazy pill') in 1996. According to an episode of the television series Drugs, Inc., it is commonly referred to in north Thailand as chocalee, due to its alleged sweet taste and chocolatey smell. In Myanmar (formerly Burma), it is also called kyethi (literally, 'button'), athi, and palarkar. In Malaysia it is known as pil kuda (literally, 'horse pill'). The name commonly used for it in the Philippines and Indonesia is shabú. The name commonly used for it in China is ma-goo or ma-guo. In Bangladesh, it is colloquially known as baba, guti, laal, khawon, ‘jinish ’, stuff or maal, bori, chocolate or chiku. Ya ba is sometimes called bhul bhuliya in India.

According to the US National Drug Intelligence Center, the drug is most commonly referred to in the US as "crazy medicine" and "Nazi speed".

== Description and effects ==
Ya ba is typically produced in a round pill form and is classified as a stimulant, consisting of methamphetamine (approximately 30%) and caffeine (60-70%), although ya ba's composition can vary. A precursor of ya ba, in the form of pure methamphetamine, was introduced into east Asia during the Second World War as a wartime stimulant. There are many different versions of ya ba, and the most common are red, pink, orange, or lime green in color and carry logos such as "R" or "WY". They are small and round, roughly 6 millimetres (0.24 in) in diameter, which means they can be packed inside a plastic soda straw for easy transportation or in a reusable "mint" container.

Ya ba tablets typically are consumed orally and are sometimes flavored like confectionery. Another method of consumption is chasing the dragon, wherein the ya ba tablet is placed on aluminium foil and heated from below, which produces vapors that are then inhaled. The drug also may be administered by crushing the tablets into powder, which is then snorted or mixed with a solvent and injected.

When swallowed in pill form the duration of the drug's effect is 8–16 hours, as compared to 1–3 hours when smoked, while the intensity is considerably reduced. The peak of the drug's effect is followed by a comedown period lasting 6–10 hours, during which the consumer may have difficulty sleeping or eating. Many consumers report that it takes them up to 24 hours after consumption to be able to fall asleep.

There are both short and long term physical and psychological effects associated with ya ba addiction, which are mostly attributed to ya ba's methamphetamine content.

=== Physical ===
Short term effects can include: poor appetite, high heart rate, high blood pressure, nausea, and increased body temperature. Long term effects can include: hair loss, liver damage, kidney failure, stroke, seizures, and cardiac arrest.

=== Psychological ===
Psychological effects can display episodically or continuously and can include: paranoia, anxiety, confusion, insomnia, and depression.

Typical ya ba consumers are working males, aged 16–40 years. Its use is also common among both female and male sex workers in Thailand and Cambodia.

== Production ==
Myanmar is the largest producer of methamphetamine in the world, with the majority of ya ba found in Thailand being produced in Myanmar, particularly in the Golden Triangle and northeastern Shan State, which borders Thailand, Laos, and China. In 2010, Myanmar trafficked 1 billion tablets to neighbouring Thailand. Ethnic militias and rebel groups (in particular the United Wa State Army) are responsible for much of this production; however, the Burmese military units are also believed to be heavily involved in the trafficking of the drugs.

== Global usage ==
=== Rise and fall in popularity in Thailand ===
Ya ba tablets were formerly sold legally at fuel stations and used by long-haul drivers to stay awake. The drug was outlawed by the Thai government in 1970.

Law enforcement officials said that as of 2002, most of the drug was produced by the United Wa State Army in Myanmar. It was smuggled from Myanmar across the porous border into Thailand. In 2014, it was reported that Thailand's northeast provinces had seen a 700% increase in the number of people arrested for meth since 2008, according to data from the Narcotics Suppression Bureau. In 2013, authorities counted more than 33,000 meth-related arrests in the northeast. The rapid growth of ya ba use in Isan mirrors that which occurred across Asia, which by 2014 accounted for more than 50 percent of global amphetamine-type stimulant consumers.

On 16 June 2016, the National Council for Peace and Order, the military junta ruling Thailand, stated that it was planning to decriminalise ya ba. In 2023 this policy was reversed, however, after Prime Minister Prayut Chan-o-cha called for a crackdown on narcotics – a move which led to Thailand once again tightening rules on methamphetamine possession.

According to the UN Office of Drugs and Crime, in 2024, over 1 billion ya ba tablets were seized in Thailand.

=== Bangladesh ===
In 2006, ya ba consumption became common for the poor. Although the extent of ya ba abuse in Bangladesh is not precisely known, seizures of the drug by authorities are frequent. It is also believed those who use it on a regular basis are frequently involved in the distribution of the drug, either directly or indirectly.

Some Burmese Rohingya refugees are hired by drug dealers to smuggle ya ba from Myanmar into Bangladesh. In 2016, 359 Burmese were arrested on ya ba-smuggling charges, and up to US$29 million worth of ya ba was seized by the Bangladeshi authorities.

In October 2018 the Bangladeshi government drafted a law which punishes a person who carries a minimum 200 grams (7.1 ounces) of ya ba with capital punishment.

=== Other countries ===
In Malaysia, it is commonly found in the state of Kelantan, on the border with Thailand.

In February 2010 it was reported that increasingly large quantities of ya ba were being smuggled into Israel by Thai migrant workers, leading to fears that its use would spread to the Israeli club scene, where ecstasy use is already common.

In 2003, the US National Drug Intelligence Center described the drug as having emerging popularity in Asian communities in the US, specifically in California. It was also described as an increasingly popular club drug.
