= List of psychoactive drugs used by militaries =

Militaries worldwide have used or are using various psychoactive drugs to improve performance of soldiers by suppressing hunger, increasing the ability to sustain effort without food, increasing and lengthening wakefulness and concentration, suppressing fear, reducing empathy, and improving reflexes and memory-recall, amongst other things.

== Contemporary ==
For drugs that recently were or currently are being used by militaries.
Administration tends to include strict medical supervision and prior briefing of the medical risks.
Caffeine, diet pills, painkillers, nicotine, and alcohol are not included on the list. Non-administrated, illegally used drugs are also not included.

Substance	Description	United States	China	India	Germany	UK	France
Amphetamine (and close derivatives)	US Air Force and potentially other branches prescribed it to pilots for long endurance flights or for critical missions.	Until 2017	Unknown	Unknown	Until 1970s/1988(East)	Unknown	Unknown
Fenethylline	Used by ISIS in combat and smuggled for financing activities. Responsible for the biggest methamphetamine related seizure in history when $1B worth of fenethylline was intercepted at an Italian port in 2020.	Unknown	Unknown	Unknown	Unknown	Unknown	Unknown
Modafinil	Militaries of several countries are known to have expressed interest in modafinil as an alternative to amphetamine – the drug traditionally employed in combat situations where troops face sleep deprivation, such as during lengthy missions. The French government indicated that the Foreign Legion used modafinil during certain covert operations. The United Kingdom's Ministry of Defence commissioned research into modafinil from QinetiQ and spent £300,000 on one investigation. In 2011, the Indian Air Force announced that modafinil was included in contingency plans. In the United States military, modafinil has been approved for use on certain Air Force missions, and it is being investigated for other uses. As of November 2012, modafinil is the only drug approved by the Air Force as a "go pill" for fatigue management. The use of dextroamphetamine (a.k.a., Dexedrine) is no longer approved.	Yes	Confirmed testing	Yes	Yes	Yes	Yes
Sleeping pills (generally)		See no-go pills	Unknown	Yes	Unknown	Unknown	Unknown

== Historic ==
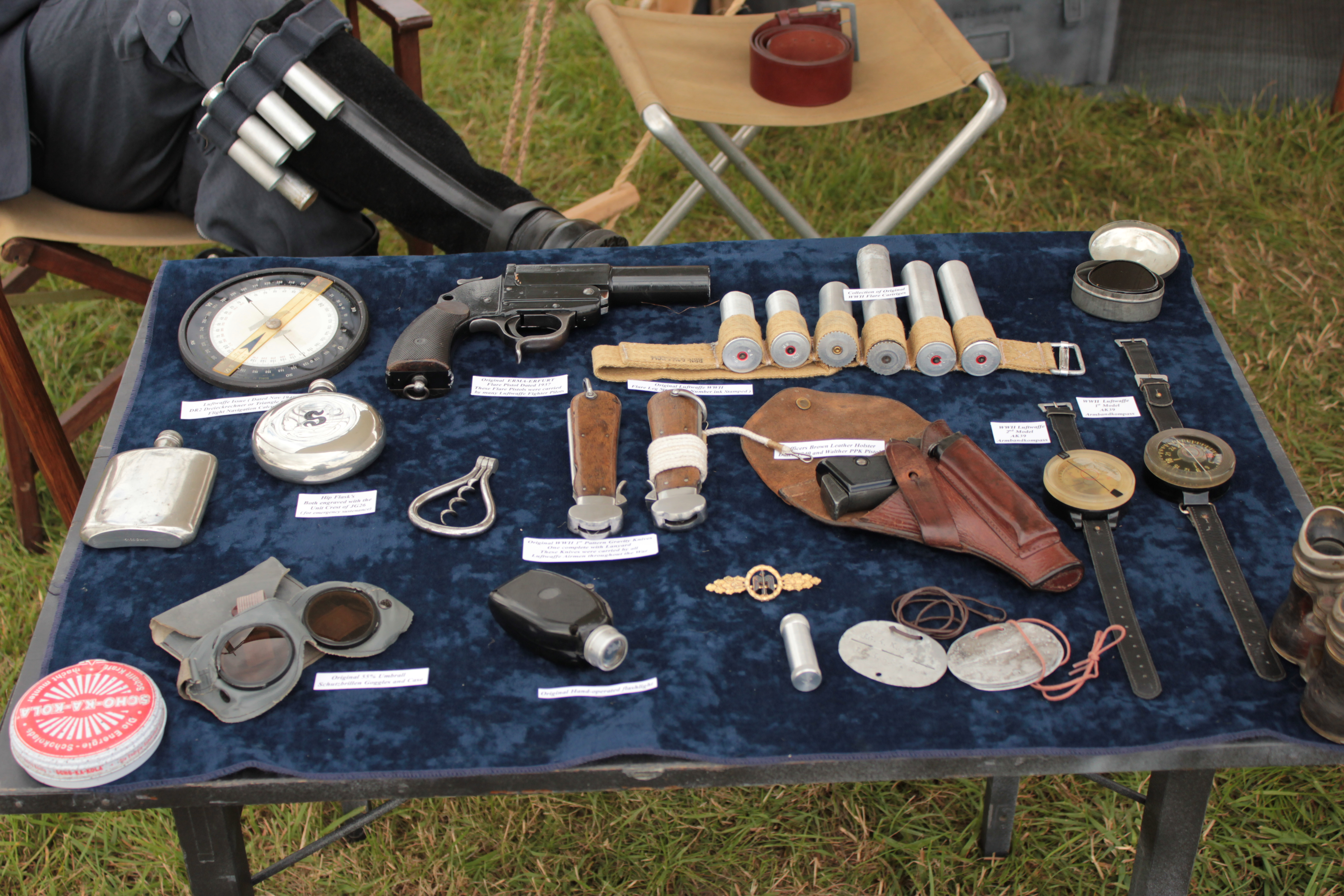
Two hip flasks, located in the left-center, are featured in the military equipment used as emergency sustenance by the Luftwaffe, which was the air force of Nazi Germany during World War II.

- Alcohol has a long association of military use, and has been called "liquid courage" for its role in preparing troops for battle, anaesthetize injured soldiers, and celebrate military victories. It has also served as a coping mechanism for combat stress reactions and a means of decompression from combat to everyday life. However, this reliance on alcohol can have negative consequences for physical and mental health. Military and veteran populations face significant challenges in addressing the co-occurrence of PTSD and alcohol use disorder.
- Benzedrine was claimed to have been administered by Allied forces during WWII, esp. by the US
  - Germany and Japan used methamphetamine.
- Hashish, a cannabis concentrate, may have been used by the Order of Assassins to induce ecstatic visions of paradise so that members of them sect would be prepared for martyrdom.
- Fenethylline (trade name Captagon) has played a role in the Syrian civil war. The production and sale of fenethylline generates large revenues which are likely used to fund the purchase of weapons, and fenethylline is used as a stimulant by combatants. Poverty and international sanctions that limit legal exports are contributing factors. Since the fall of the Assad regime the new Syrian transitional government has ordered the cessation of the drug trade, and production has reportedly been reduced by 90%.
- Methamphetamine ("Panzerschokolade", "Pervitin") during WWII by Nazi Germany Panzerschokolade was the eponymous name that the Luftwaffe are claimed to have used.
  - D-IX was a combination of Methamphetamine, Oxycodone, and Cocaine that was produced in 1944 but could not be mass produced before the war ended. It was part of a future generation of "pep pills" for the German military and was tested on concentration camp prisoners.

== See also ==
- Academy of Military Medical Sciences
- History and culture of substituted amphetamines § Military use
- MKUltra
- Chemical warfare
- Chemical weapon
- List of chemical warfare agents
- List of highly toxic gases
- Psychochemical warfare
- Military medicine
- Neuroenhancement
- Nootropic
- Supersoldier
- Use of drugs in warfare
