= Drug policy of Nazi Germany =

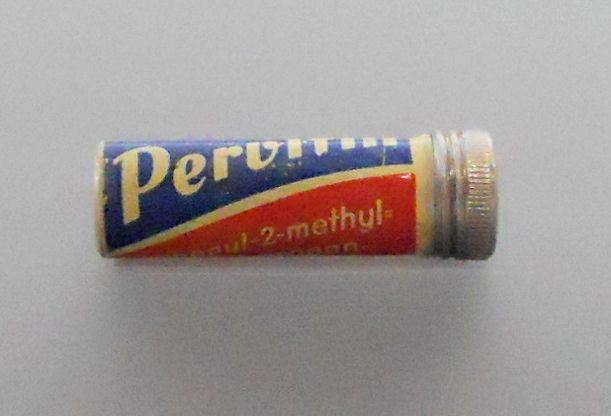
Pervitin, an early form of methamphetamine, was widely used in Nazi Germany. By 1941, usage was restricted to a doctor's prescription, and the military tightly controlled its distribution.

The generally tolerant official drug policy in the Third Reich, the period of Nazi control of Germany from the 1933 Machtergreifung to Germany's 1945 defeat in World War II, was inherited from the Weimar government which was installed in 1919 following the dissolution of the German monarchy at the end of World War I.

== Historical background ==
Before the First World War, the collaborative research efforts of the German university system and German corporations enabled the German corporate sector as a whole to obtain a virtual worldwide monopoly on drugs whose production required chemical expertise and industrial capacity. This research was fueled by revenues from the sale of morphine, an alkaloid found in opium, first identified by the German chemist and pharmacist Friedrich Sertürner in 1804 and patented by Merck soon afterward. German pharmaceutical companies' work with morphine and its derivatives found particular success in using them as pain relievers and cough suppressants, with Bayer eventually recognizing the potency of heroin, which was legal in Germany at the time (and until the 1950s, before which it was banned only in Asia and the United States). During the era of the German Empire, consolidated in the late 1860s and early 1870s, the German government's militaristic inclinations prompted it to add financial support to research in sectors including pharmaceuticals and optimization of industrial processes.

== Civilian-sector drug policy in Nazi Germany ==
The German populace's experience during and after the First World War inspired the Weimar and Nazi governments to adopt an attitude of tolerance toward the use of drugs to relieve pain, increase performance, and avoid withdrawal. Most drugs were permitted either universally or for individuals with a medical prescription. Many of the drug addicts in 1920s and 1930s Germany were First World War veterans who required addictive drugs for pain relief and/or medical personnel who had access to such drugs. Because support from veterans was so critical to the National Socialist Party they were highly inclined to take a permissive view of addicts and addiction. The focus of the governments efforts was instead on cracking down on illicit drug smuggling out of Germany and into the rest of Europe, which was very common at the time, and which could be blamed on the previous government without antagonizing veterans.

== Drug policy and use within the Wehrmacht ==
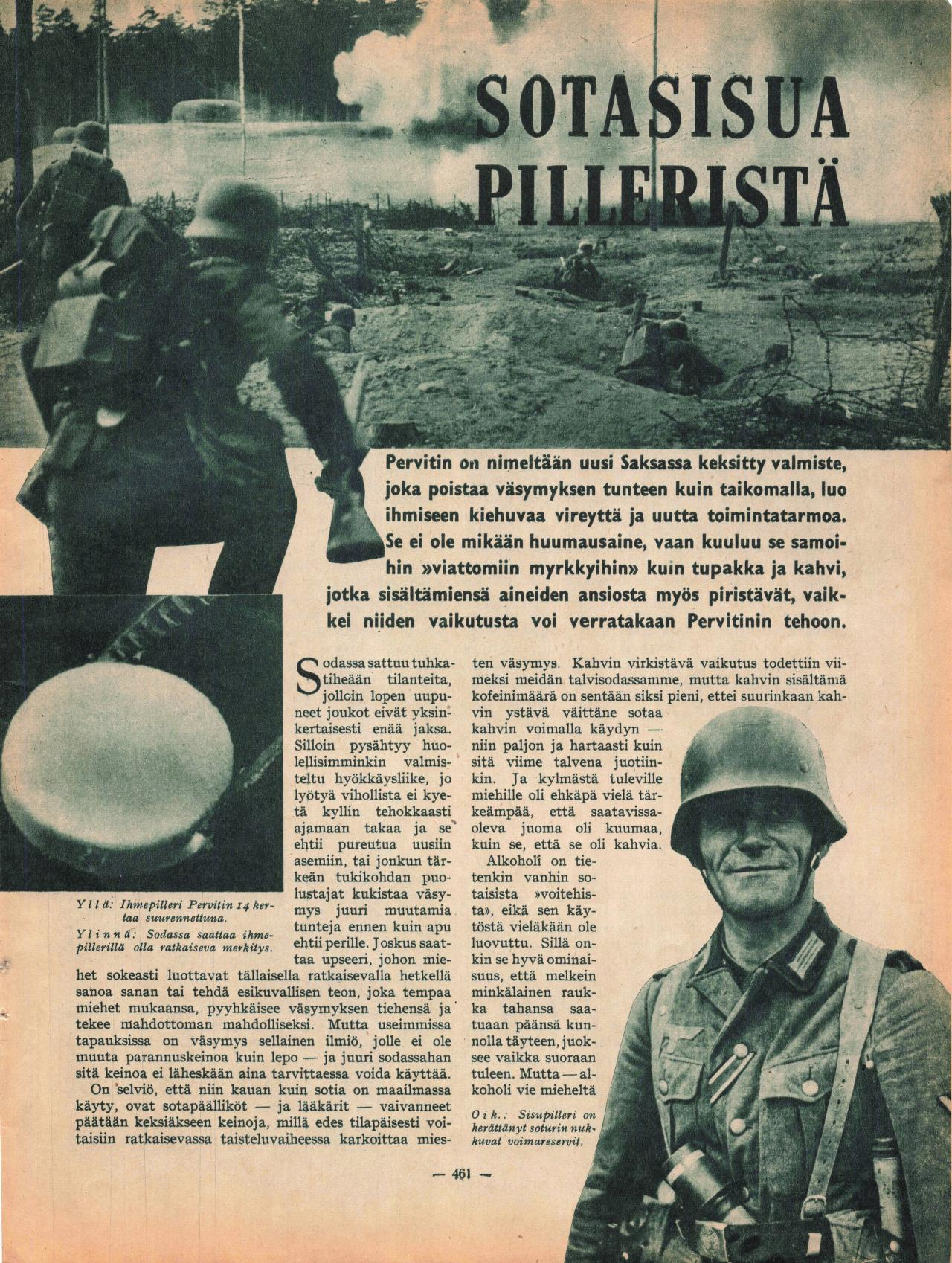
Article in the Finnish military magazine Hakkapeliitta (April 1941) praising the new German stimulant Pervitin (methamphetamine hydrochloride) as a safe sisu pill that banishes fatigue and boosts soldiers’ endurance and morale. At the time, Finland cooperated with Nazi Germany during World War II.

From 1938, methamphetamine was marketed on a large scale in Germany as a nonprescription drug under the brand name Pervitin, produced by the Berlin-based Temmler pharmaceutical company. It was used by all branches of the combined armed forces of the Third Reich, for its stimulant effects and to induce extended wakefulness. Pervitin became colloquially known among the German troops as "Stuka-Tablets" (Stuka-Tabletten) and "Herman-Göring-Pills" (Hermann-Göring-Pillen), as a snide allusion to Göring's widely-known addiction to drugs. However, the side effects, particularly the withdrawal symptoms, were so serious that the army sharply cut back its usage in 1940. By 1941, usage was restricted to a doctor's prescription, and the military tightly controlled its distribution. Soldiers would only receive a couple of tablets at a time, and were discouraged from using them in combat. Historian Łukasz Kamieński says,

A soldier going to battle on Pervitin usually found himself unable to perform effectively for the next day or two. Suffering from a drug hangover and looking more like a zombie than a great warrior, he had to recover from the side effects.

Some soldiers turned violent, committing war crimes against civilians; others attacked their own officers. At the end of the war, it was used as part of a new drug: D-IX.

=== Stimulants ===
In 1938 Pervitin, a methamphetamine drug newly developed by the Berlin-based Temmler Pharma, was introduced to the civilian market and quickly became endemic among the German population. It was particularly popular among people who worked night shifts and young recreational drug users, both of whom often stayed awake late into the night, because the drug increased alertness, confidence, concentration, and risk-taking behavior, in addition to reducing sensitivity to pain, hunger, and tiredness. Nazi military doctor Otto Friedrich Ranke tested the drug on 90 university students to study its effects, which led him to conclude that Pervitin could help Nazi Germany win the war.

Methamphetamine use is believed to have played a role in the speed of Nazi Germany's initial blitzkrieg operations. At the request of Vice-Admiral Hellmuth Heye for a stronger pill that would "keep soldiers ready for battle when they are asked to continue fighting beyond a period considered normal," a pharmacologist produced a pill dubbed D-IX. The new drug contained cocaine, whose effects substantially overlap with those of amphetamine but feature greater euphoria, and a morphine-based painkiller in addition to Pervitin.

=== Alcohol ===
At the start of World War II, alcohol consumption was widespread among members of the Wehrmacht. At first, high-ranking officials encouraged its use as a means of relaxation and a crude method of mitigating the psychological effects of combat, in the latter case through what later scientific developments would describe as blocking the consolidation of traumatic memories. After the fall of France (Summer 1940), however, Wehrmacht commanders observed that their soldiers' behavior was deteriorating, with "fights, accidents, mistreatment of subordinates, violence against superior officers and "crimes involving unnatural sexual acts" becoming more frequent. The Commander-in-Chief of the German military, General Walther von Brauchitsch, concluded that his troops were committing "most serious infractions" of morality and discipline, and that the culprit was alcohol abuse. In response, Adolf Hitler attempted to curb the reckless use of alcohol in the military, promising severe punishment for soldiers who exhibited public drunkenness or otherwise "allow[ed] themselves to be tempted to engage in criminal acts as a result of alcohol abuse." Serious offenders could expect "a humiliating death." This revised policy accompanied an increase in Nazi Party disapproval of alcohol use in the civilian sector, reflecting an extension to alcohol of the longstanding Nazi condemnation of tobacco consumption as diminishing the strength and purity of the "Aryan race."

== Drug use within the Nazi Party (NSDAP) ==
The extent of Adolf Hitler's drug use is subject to debate. Hitler was in close daily contact with Doctor Theodor Morell, who in 1936 prescribed him cultures of live bacteria to ease his digestive ailments, at which point Hitler made him his personal physician. Dr. Morell's popularity among Hitler's inner circle skyrocketed, and he was sarcastically dubbed by Göring "The Reichsmaster of the Injections." Dr. Morell went on to prescribe powder cocaine to soothe Hitler's throat and clear his sinuses. Some of Hitler's close allies came to strongly distrust Dr. Morell, but when they raised concerns privately, they were sharply rebuked.

Whether Hitler was addicted to amphetamines remains unclear. Recent narratives, including the documentary Hitler's Hidden Drug Habit and Norman Ohler's 2016 book Blitzed: Drugs in Nazi Germany claim that he was highly dependent. Ohler claims that when Hitler's drug supplies ran out by the end of the war, he suffered severe withdrawal from serotonin and dopamine, paranoia, psychosis, rotting teeth, extreme shaking, kidney failure and delusion. However, these claims have been harshly criticized by some historians. Other examinations of Hitler's medical records have supported occasional, rather than habitual, use of amphetamines. Hitler's tremors late in life have been popularly attributed to Parkinson's Disease, perhaps induced early by his drug use, whereas Ohler argues amphetamines to have been entirely responsible.

Hermann Göring, Hitler's closest aide, had served in the Luftstreitkräfte during World War I and suffered a severe hip injury during combat. He became seriously addicted to the morphine that was prescribed to him in order to relieve the pain which resulted from this injury and the gunshot wound, variously described as a thigh or groin injury, that he sustained while taking part in the 1923 Beer Hall Putsch in Munich. In 1925, after consulting his wife, he entered a Swedish mental hospital for detoxification and treatment. When Göring was captured near the end of the war, he was found to be addicted to dihydrocodeine and was subsequently weaned off it.

== Aftermath ==
After the war, Pervitin remained easily accessible, both on the black market and as a prescription drug. Doctors prescribed it to patients as an appetite suppressant or they prescribed it in order to improve the moods of patients who were struggling with depression. Students, especially medical students, turned to the stimulant because it enabled them to review more information through the night and finish their studies faster. The drug was removed from the medical supplies of East and West Germany in the 1970s and 1980s respectively, and following German reunification it was deemed illegal in the entire country. Today, a different form of the drug, crystal methamphetamine, has become popular throughout Europe and the United States despite governmental prohibition and eradication efforts.

== See also ==
- Arguments for and against drug prohibition
  - Drug liberalization
  - Drug prohibition
- Crime in Germany
- Drug policy of Germany
- Drug policy of the Soviet Union
- Drug policy of the United Kingdom
- Drug policy of the United States
- Health of Adolf Hitler
  - Adolf Hitler and vegetarianism
  - Psychopathography of Adolf Hitler
- Law enforcement in Germany
- Political abuse of psychiatry
- Recreational drug use
- Teetotalism
  - Temperance movement
- Tobacco harm reduction
  - Anti-tobacco movement in Nazi Germany
- Use of drugs in warfare
