= Otto Friedrich Ranke =

German physiologist (1899–1959)

- Born: 17 August 1899; Munich, Germany
- Died: 19 November 1959 (aged 60); Erlangen, West Germany
- Education: Ludwig-Maximilians-Universität München; University of Freiburg; Heidelberg University
- Known for: Research on methamphetamine and performance-enhancing drugs
- Scientific career
- Fields: Physiology
- Workplaces: University of Erlangen–Nuremberg
- Doctoral advisor: Ludwig Aschoff, Philipp Broemser

Otto Friedrich Ranke (17 August 1899 in Munich – 19 November 1959) was a German physiologist and university professor. Ranke introduced methamphetamine as a performance enhancer in the Wehrmacht during World War II.

== Early years and education ==
Ranke, whose father was the psychiatrist Karl Ranke (1861–1951), graduated after completing his study of medicine at the Ludwig-Maximilians-Universität München and the University of Freiburg. In Freiburg, Ranke received a medical doctorate under Ludwig Aschoff with a dissertation entitled "On the change of the elastic resistance of the aortic intima and resulting formation of atheroma." Ranke studied mathematics at the Technical University of Munich until 1925 with the aid of a grant from the Rockefeller Foundation. He became an assistant at the Institute of Pathology of the University of Freiburg under Philipp Broemser, and worked from 1928 to 1935 at the Physiological Institutes of the University of Basel and Heidelberg University. Ranke obtained his science doctorate in 1931 from Heidelberg University with a thesis entitled "The Rectifier Resonance Theory: An extension of the Helmholtz resonance theory of hearing by physical examination of cochlear fluid oscillations."

== Political and military activities ==
Ranke was a member of Der Stahlhelm, which was dissolved and integrated into the Sturmabteilung (SA) from 1934 to 1935, and was a member of the National Socialist Teachers League. In 1935, Ranke joined the Aviation Medical Research Institute of the Military Medical Academy in Berlin, where Hubertus Strughold worked. Ranke was appointed in 1936 to außerplanmäßiger (extraordinary) professor at the Friedrich Wilhelm University of Berlin. From 1937 to 1945, Ranke headed the Institute of General and Military Physiology (Institut fur Allgemeine und Wehrphysiologie) at the Military Medical Academy in Berlin. Ranke joined the Wehrmacht in 1939 with the rank of Oberstabsarzt (Major in Medical Corps) and conducted research at the Laboratory for Aviation Medicine on Thermoregulation and Nutritional Physiology of the Military Medical Academy. Ranke also served as an advisory officer to the military. As a medical staff officer Ranke took part in the conference, "Medical Problems Arising from Sea and Winter," (Tagung über Ärztliche Fragen bei Seenot und Wintertod) 26 and 27 August 1942 in Nuremberg, where the hypothermia experiments in the Dachau concentration camp were presented. Along with Karl Brandt, Ranke was, from 1944, a member of multiple scientific advisory boards.

== Introduces military methamphetamine ==
In an effort to make its front-line soldiers and fighter pilots fight longer, harder, and with less concern for individual safety, the German army ordered them to take military-issue pills made from methamphetamine and a primarily cocaine-based stimulant. Pervitin, a methamphetamine drug newly developed by the Berlin-based Temmler pharmaceutical company, first entered the civilian market in 1938; it quickly became a top seller among the German population. The drug was brought to the attention of Ranke, at the time a military doctor and director of the Institute for General and Defense Physiology at Berlin's Academy of Military Medicine. The effects of amphetamines are similar to those of the adrenaline produced by the body, triggering a heightened state of alert. In most people, the substance increases self-confidence, concentration, and willingness to take risks while at the same time reducing sensitivity to pain, hunger, thirst, and the need for sleep. In September 1939, Ranke tested the drug on 90 university students and concluded that Pervitin could help the Wehrmacht win the war. Cocaine, whose effects substantially overlap with those of amphetamine but feature greater euphoria, was later added to the formulation to increase potency through the multiplicative effects of drug interaction and to reinforce use by individuals.

Some medical authorities criticized this drug regimen, with distributed pills numbered in the millions, as having the negative consequence that many soldiers became addicted to drugs and useless in any military capacity, whether combat or supporting.

== Later years and death ==
In 1946, after three months, the American military government cashiered him. From mid-September 1947 until his death, Ranke was professor of physiology at the University of Erlangen–Nuremberg and served as director of the Physiological Institute. His research interests were sensory and nutritional physiology and physiology of metabolism. Ranke was author of many scientific publications. In 1950 together with Konrad Lang he edited a textbook of Metabolism and Nutrition. Ranke died in 1959 unexpectedly of an arterial thrombosis in his sleep.
