= Norman Ohler =

German writer (born 1970)

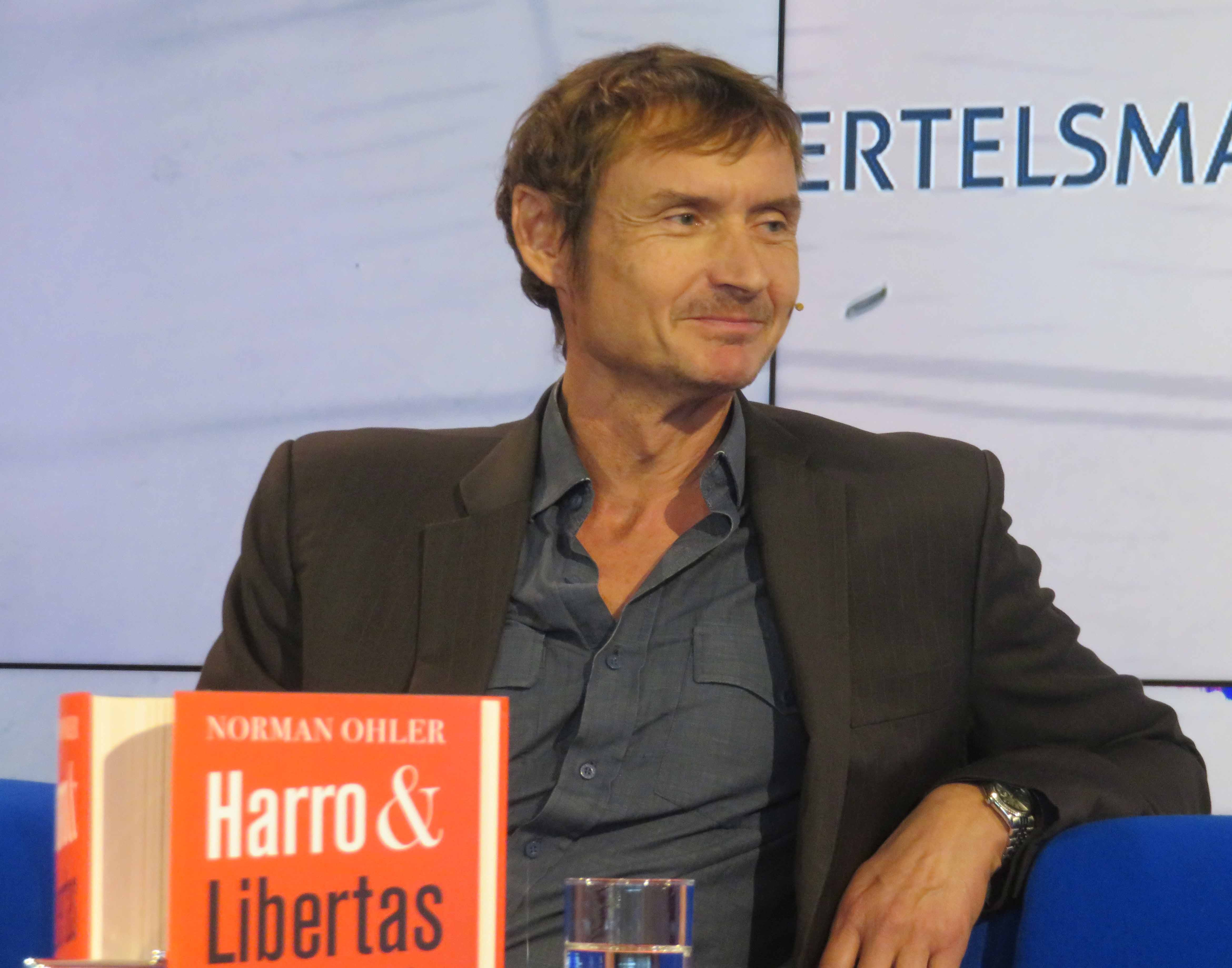
- Born: 1970 (age 55–56); Zweibrücken, West Germany
- Occupations: Author, screenwriter, journalist
- Relatives: Wolfgang Ohler (father)
- Writing career
- Language: German, English
- Genres: Literary fiction, non-fiction, history
- Notable work: Blitzed: Drugs in the Third Reich
- Website: normanohler.de

Norman Ohler (born 1970) is a German author, novelist, and screenwriter, best known for his popular history book Blitzed: Drugs in the Third Reich, which has been published in over 30 languages.

== Early life and education ==
Ohler was born in Zweibrücken, West Germany in 1970 and attended journalism school in Hamburg.

== Writing ==
In 1995 he published Die Quotenmaschine, the world's first hypertext novel in German. His second novel, Mitte, was published in 2001 and praised by Der Spiegel as his 'masterpiece', followed by his third, Stadt des Goldes (city of gold) in 2002, set in Ponte City. These three novels form Ohler's City Trilogy.

In 2004, Ohler was invited by the German Goethe-Institut to act as writer-in-residence in Ramallah. There, Ohler wrote about the life of the Palestinians in the West Bank and published the last interview Yassir Arafat gave, shortly before his death. Ohler has also worked as writer-in-residence in Tel Aviv and Jerusalem.

In 2008, he co-wrote the movie Palermo Shooting with Wim Wenders, starring Dennis Hopper.

=== Blitzed: Drugs in Nazi Germany ===
In September 2015, Kiepenheuer & Witsch published Ohler's first non-fiction work, Der totale Rausch: Drogen im Dritten Reich; the book appeared in English as Blitzed: Drugs in Nazi Germany in 2016. Upon publication in the US, it became a New York Times bestseller. In the book, Ohler researches what role psychoactive drugs, particularly stimulants such as methamphetamine, played in the military history of World War II, concluding that many of the German military and political leadership—especially Adolf Hitler—used psychoactive drugs during the war.

The book was praised by some historians: Antony Beevor said it was 'a remarkable work of research. Ohler's account makes us look at this densely studied period rather differently', Ian Kershaw described it as 'very good and extremely interesting ... a serious piece of scholarship very well-researched' and Hans Mommsen, one of Germany's leading historians, refers to Blitzed as 'changing the overall picture'.

However, other historians disagreed with Ohler's approach. German historian, Nikolaus Wachsmann wrote that Ohler "appears to mix fact and fiction. [...] He spices up the evidence, throws in pop culture references ("Teutonic Easy Riders"), and garnishes it with snazzy puns ("High Hitler"). It remains to be seen if this recipe will appeal to anglophone readers. To borrow Ohler's style: will they experience a big buzz, or a bad trip?". Dagmar Herzog expressed the view that 'Ohler's analysis does not withstand close scrutiny. (…) Anyone seeking a deepened understanding of the Nazi period must be wary of a book that provides more distraction and distortion than clarification.' James Pugh judged that while the book is an 'engaging and entertaining piece of journalistic history', it was 'troubling based on its tone, scholarship and engagement with the literature'. Richard J. Evans, Regius Professor of History at the University of Cambridge from 2008 to 2014, author of History of the Third Reich, called Blitzed 'a crass and dangerously inaccurate account'. He also wrote that the book is 'morally and politically dangerous', because it implies that Hitler was not responsible for his actions. Ohler rejected this claim. Evans replied: "'Blitzed' belongs not in the world of serious history, but in the new landscape of 'post-truth' and 'alternative facts'".

=== The Bohemians – The Lovers who led Germany's Resistance against the Nazis ===
In 2020, Ohler's second non-fiction book was released: The Bohemians – The Lovers who led Germany's Resistance against the Nazis. The New York Times said it was "a detailed and meticulously researched tale about a pair of young German resisters that reads like a thriller but is supported by 20 pages of footnotes".

== Publications ==
=== Novels ===
- Die Quotenmaschine (1998)
- Mitte (2001)
- Stadt des Goldes = city of gold (2003) – published in South Africa as Ponte City
- Die Gleichung des Lebens (2017)

=== Non-fiction ===
- Blitzed: Drugs in Nazi Germany (2016), ISBN 0241256992
- The Bohemians – The Lovers who led Germany's Resistance against the Nazis (2020), ISBN 1328566307
- Tripped: Nazi Germany, The CIA and the Dawn of the Psychedelic Age (2024), ISBN 978-0-358-64650-1

== Films ==
- Palermo Shooting, screenwriter (2008)
