= Smoking in the United States military =

History, culture, legality and prevalence of smoking in the U.S. military

The history of smoking in the United States military dates to the Revolutionary War, but smoking's systemic association with the armed forces started in World War I, when tobacco companies began directly distributing cigarettes to servicemen, and the eventual inclusion of cigarettes into rations.

High smoking rates amongst military personnel has persisted to the present day, even as rates have declined among civilians. The Department of Defense has made attempts to reduce smoking, citing the health risks and negative impact on troop readiness and training costs.

== Smoking in the US military from 1917 to 1975 ==
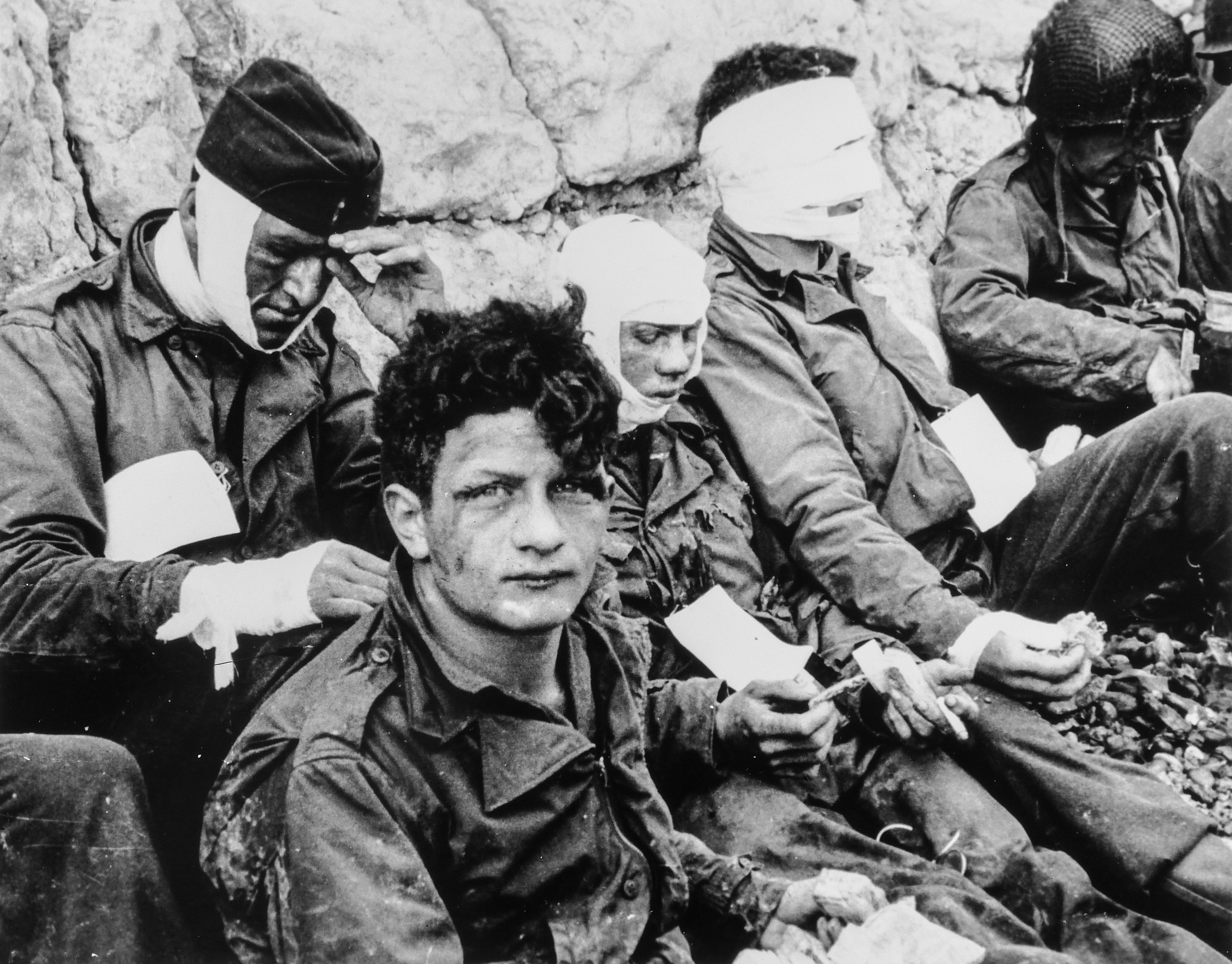
Wounded soldiers with cigarettes at Omaha Beach on D-Day

With the American entry into World War I in 1917, cigarette use increased dramatically among United States military personnel. Cigarettes were considered instrumental for servicemen to psychologically cope with their circumstances, boosting overall troop morale. General John Pershing viewed tobacco as paramount to the war effort, saying, "You ask me what we need to win this war. I answer tobacco as much as bullets. Tobacco is as indispensable as the daily ration; we must have thousands of tons without delay." Cigarettes became so integrated into military life that they also served as a form of currency. Although cigarettes had been regarded as a physical and moral hazard by early anti-tobacco movements, by the end of World War I, popular support for distributing cigarettes to troops increased. The New York Times wrote that cigarettes "lighten[ed] the inevitable hardships of war," and another popular periodical described cigarettes as the "last and only solace of the wounded."

During World War II, tobacco companies continued to foster this culture of wartime smoking by sending free cigarettes to troops and supporting the inclusion of cigarettes into military rations. Advertisements also encouraged home front relatives to send cigarettes to troops. Despite mounting evidence in the 1950s of the adverse health effects of smoking and tobacco use, the military continued to include cigarettes in rations until 1975.

== Attempts at tobacco control initiatives ==
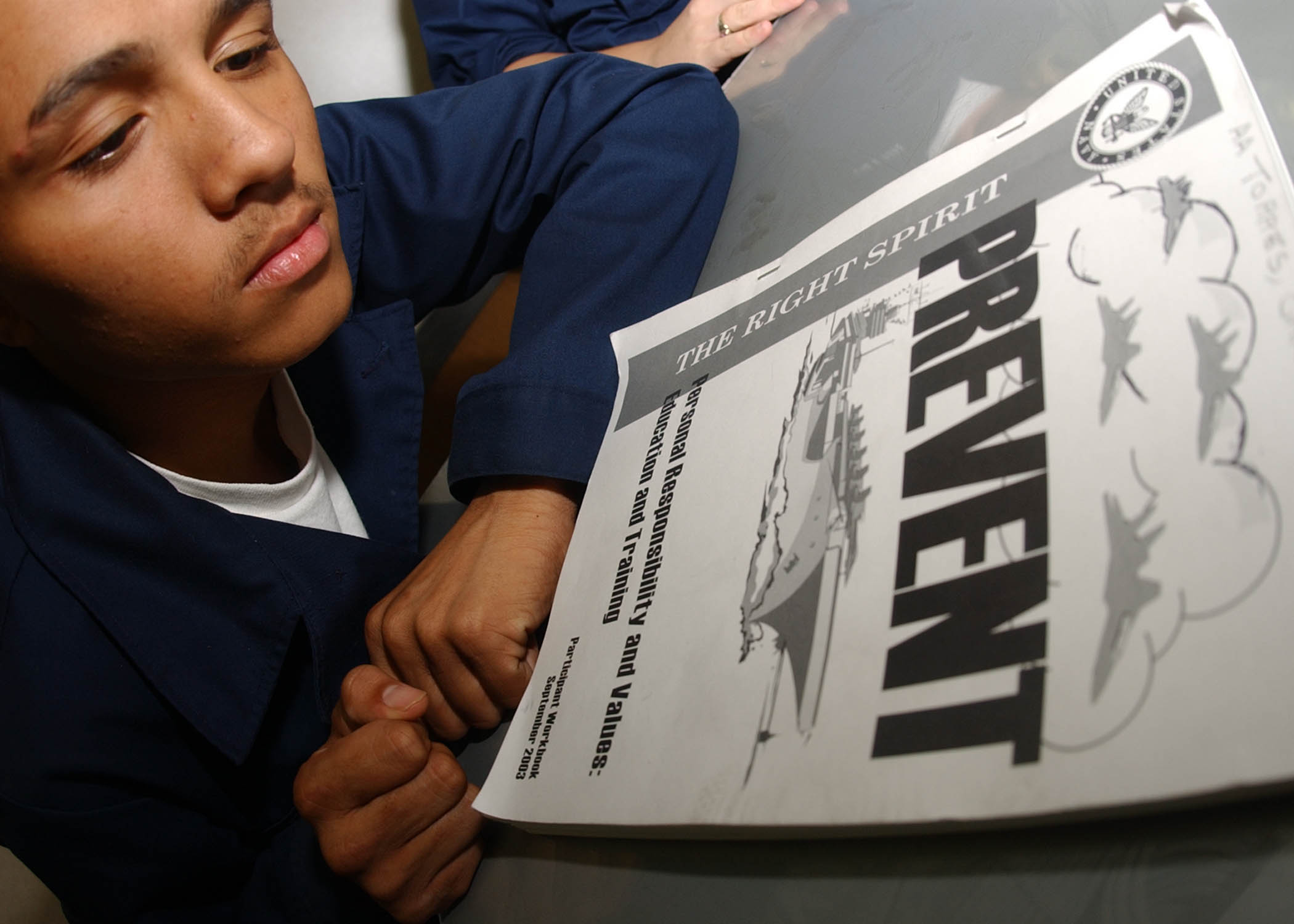
"Prevent" course booklet, participant workbook September 2003, including tobacco issues.

The United States Department of Defense discontinued the inclusion of cigarettes in K-rations and C-rations in 1975, citing scientific data about the health risks of smoking and its negative impact on troop readiness. By 1978, the Department of Defense had implemented basic smoking regulations, including the designation of smoking and nonsmoking areas.

In 1985, the Department of Defense conducted a study that revealed that smoking rates of military personnel (47%) were significantly higher than that of US civilians (30%) and concluded that smoking had a negative effect on troop readiness. The report also cited tobacco-related healthcare costs as high as $209.9 million, and recommended methods to curb smoking in the military, including the elimination of tobacco products from stores, raising tobacco prices to civilian levels, and an educational program to discourage smoking. In 1986, the DoD Directive 1010.10 issued by Secretary of Defense Caspar Weinberger began "an intense anti-smoking campaign...at all levels of all Services." It established a policy on smoking and other health risk behaviors such as alcohol consumption. The policy banned the use of tobacco during basic training, increased the number of designated nonsmoking areas, and prohibited health care providers from smoking on duty. The goal of the policy was to reduce all tobacco use rates to below that of civilians, and to reduce personnel and active duty rates from 52% to 25% by 1990. In 1992, the DeCA Directive 40-13 policy prohibited commissaries and exchanges from participating with promotions by tobacco manufacturers directed specifically at military personnel, and required commissaries to stock cigarettes in the back. In 1993, the USS Theodore Roosevelt (CVN-71) became the first smoke-free Navy ship. By 1994, the Department of Defense had implemented Directive 1010.15 which banned smoking in workplaces, designated outdoor smoking areas, and created the precursor of an education program that sought to distribute information to new personnel on the health effects of smoking and to encourage smokers to quit. Executive Order 13058 in 1997 banned smoking in all government-owned, rented, or leased interior spaces, but the Department of Defense approved a three-year phase-in period for their facilities and eventually implemented the ban on December 7, 2002. Despite these attempts, by 1988, the smoking rate had only decreased to 42% and far exceeded the rate of civilians. And although prevalence did decrease to 29.9% from 1980 to 1998, it has increased since then and appears to still be increasing.

=== Tobacco industry's response ===
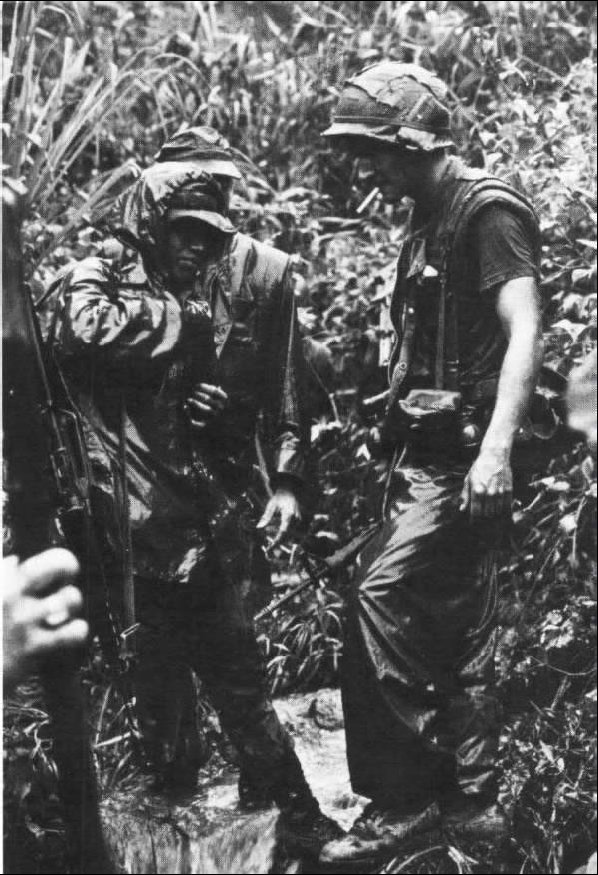
Vietnam War, 1969

Realizing the opportunities of a worldwide military market due to the young demographics of military personnel and the smoking initiation associated with new recruits, the Tobacco Institute, which served as the tobacco industry's lobbying organization, and Philip Morris perceived these new tobacco control initiatives as a threat and conceived strategies to circumvent the government policies. Another incentive for the tobacco industry to protect its military market was the recognized phenomenon that consumer product preferences developed during years serving in the military would later translate into civilian market profits as service members left the military or retired. After the implementation of Directive 1010.10 in 1986, the Tobacco Institute and Philip Morris immediately began seeking the support of tobacco-friendly politicians against the policy, citing that the policy would have a negative impact on military recruitment, retention, and morale. Furthermore, letters sent to Secretary of Defense Weinberger from politicians invoked rhetoric about the infringement of "personal rights" and "an individual's right to smoke." Such political lobbying helped to limit the implementation and the further extension of Directive 1010.10.

Although the Department of Defense had discontinued the practice of free distribution of cigarettes during wartime, tobacco companies began campaigns during the Gulf War (1990-1991) to distribute free cigarettes to soldiers stationed in Saudi Arabia, but would eventually be rebuffed by the Department of Defense. Regardless, Philip Morris then began a campaign of sales through direct mail, and extended promotions to deployed troops that included the delivery of branded goods such as playing cards and cup cozies. The military assisted the tobacco companies in delivering shipments to military stores in Saudi Arabia at government expense. Another controversy arose when it was discovered that RJ Reynolds had placed their company name on the front and a Camel advertisement on the back of donated magazines from Operation Desert News, a civilian project to bring magazines to the troops. In spite of the initial rejection by the Department of Defense due to the advertisement, constant pressure from RJ Reynolds and politicians allowed the magazines to be delivered with the advertisement at government expense, violating military policy that forbade tobacco-branded promotions directed at military personnel. In addition, Philip Morris focused on promoting the Marlboro brand with the goal of fostering corporate goodwill by initiating the "Marlboro holiday voice card" program. Held on 10 military bases, they invited family of deployed personnel to record a message for them onto a chip inserted into a greeting card, and later allowed bases to extend the recording of such messages to the public. Despite being in violation of Department of Defense policy concerning tobacco-branded programs directed at military personnel, Philip Morris had received permission to carry out the program from the Defense Logistics Agency, the Morale, Welfare and Recreation headquarters of the services, and base commanders. Furthermore, after troops were withdrawn from the conflict in 1991, tobacco companies sponsored "Welcome Home" events for returning troops featuring extensive brand promotion. Although the Department of Defense had enacted policies to reduce tobacco use amongst personnel, the successful efforts of tobacco companies as well as the cultural factors of smoking in the military have produced a mixed message of tobacco promotion and reduction to military personnel.

== Present-day smoking in the US military ==
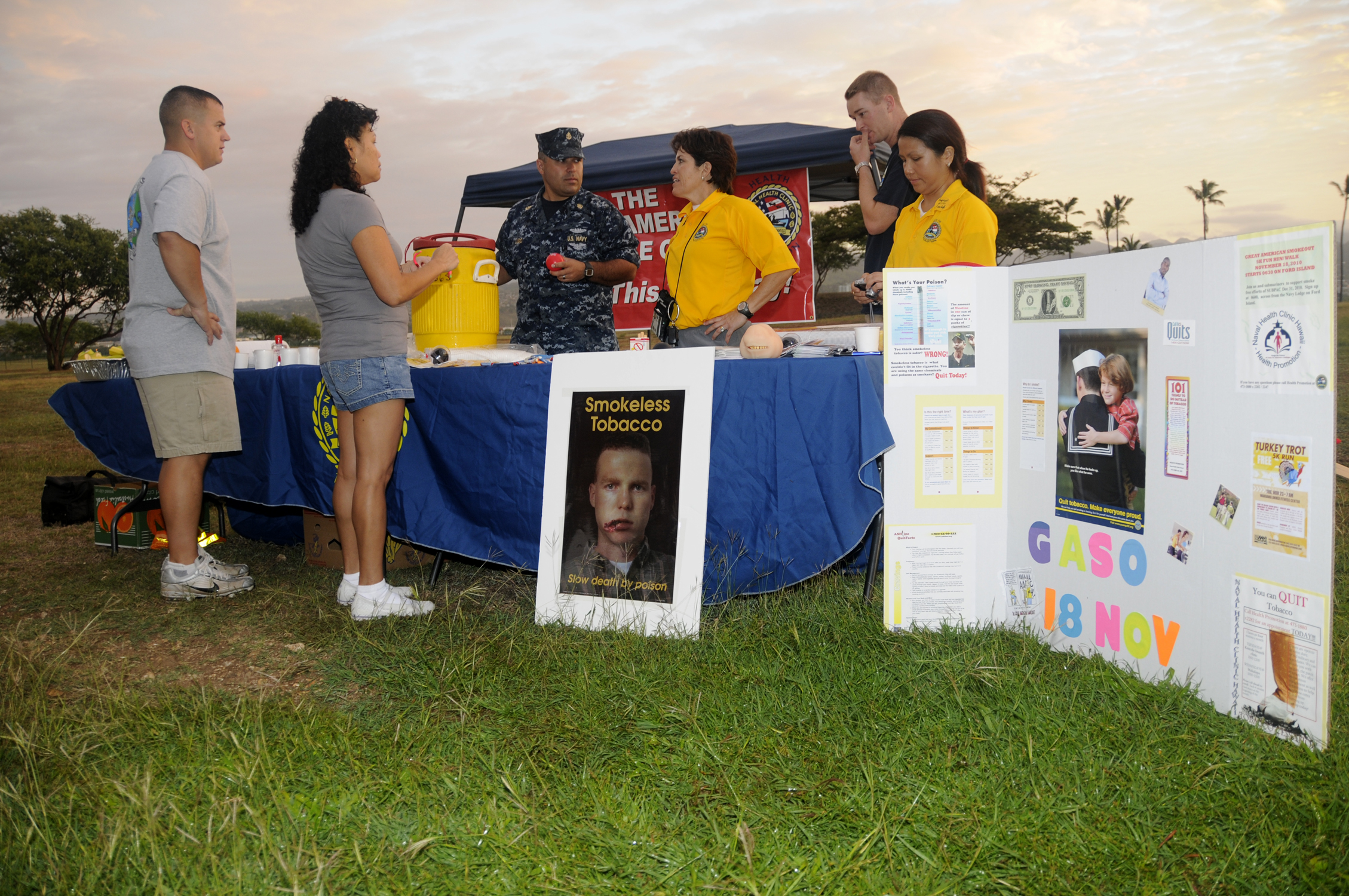
Naval Health Clinic, Hawaii, 2010.

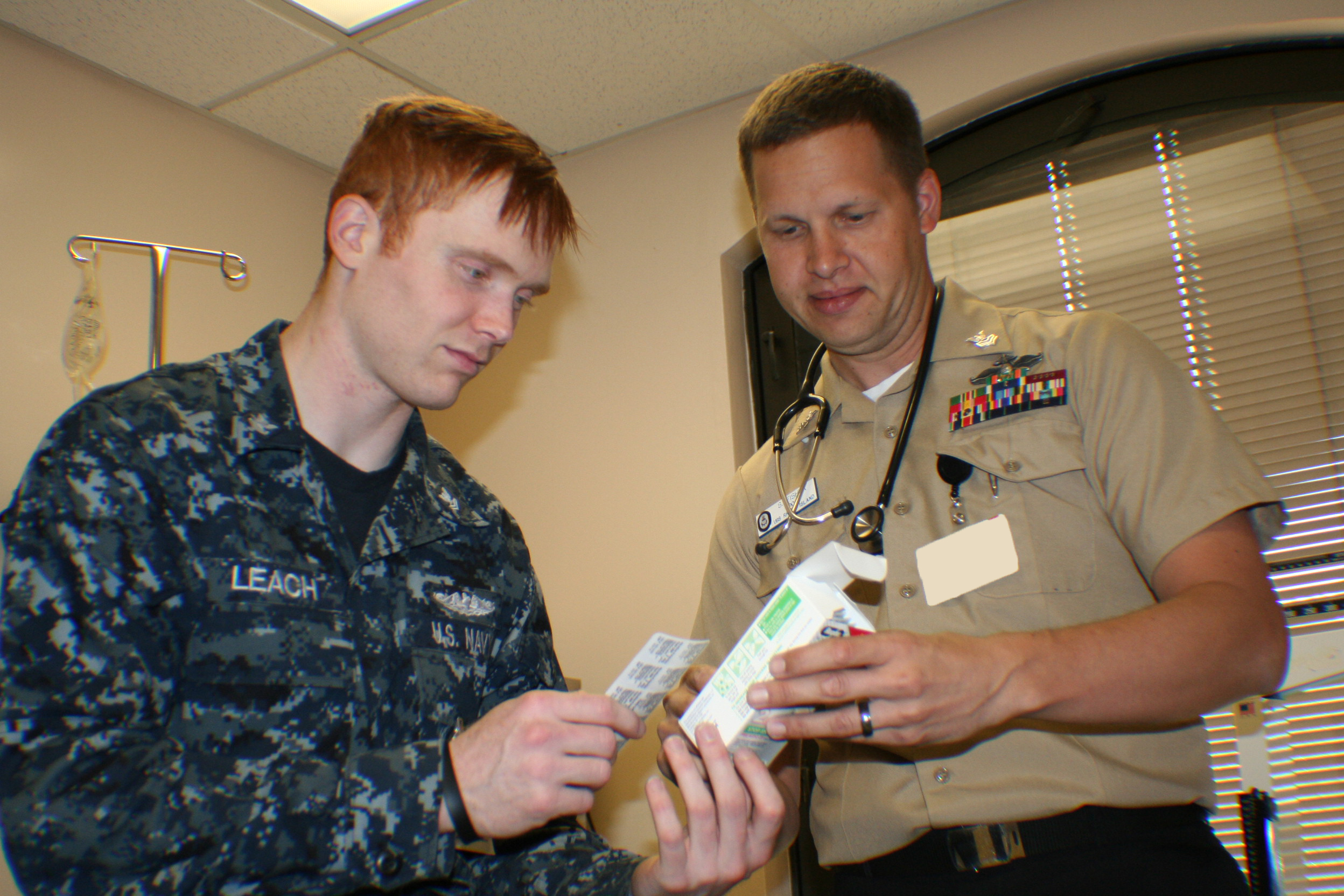
A sailor receiving information about nicotine gum (Naval Submarine Base Kings Bay Medical Clinic, 2010)

In 2005, the smoking rate of military personnel was found to be 32.2%, compared to the civilian rate of 21%. The higher smoking rate suggests that certain aspects of the military may foster smoking. These factors include the demographic most likely to volunteer for service (i.e. those who enter the service are more likely to already be smokers), peer influence, combat stress, boredom, and easy access to cheap tobacco products. Another factor that may lead to increased tobacco use is deployment. One study found that among nonsmokers, smoking initiation was observed in 1.3% of nondeployed personnel while 2.3% were observed in deployed personnel. Among past smokers, resumption of smoking occurred in 28.7% of non deployed personnel and 39.4% of deployed personnel, while smoking increased 44% among the former and 57% among the latter. US troops in Iraq and Afghanistan have been reported to smoke at twice the rate of other Americans. Even after leaving the service, many veterans continue to smoke as the prevalence of smoking among veterans has been reported to be 27% during 2003 to 2007, and military smoking is strongly associated with increased lifelong cigarette consumption. According to the National Survey on Drug Use and Health's 2010-2015 analysis, around 30% of the active duty service members use tobacco. Such high levels of smoking have led to significant costs to the Department of Defense. The costs of smoking among US military health care system beneficiaries have been estimated to be more than $900 million per year in 1995, with $584 million in direct health care costs and $346 million in lost productivity among active duty personnel. Suicide, which accounts for 13% of fatalities in the military, has also been tied to smoking, as the risk of suicide among military men was found to increase significantly with the number of cigarettes smoked daily. Smoking also affects training costs as smokers are more likely to be discharged during training, and are associated with $18 million per year in excess training costs for the US Air Force, and over $130 million per year for all service branches.

In 2008 unauthorized smoking and improper storage of chemicals caused major damage to USS George Washington (CVN-73).

The Department of Defense hoped to lower rates of tobacco use to 12% by the end of 2010. To achieve their goal, Pentagon health experts urged then-Defense Secretary Robert Gates to ban the use of tobacco by troops and end its sale on military property. The Navy implemented a ban on smoking in submarines by the end of 2010 – highlighting one of the last loopholes in the indoor smoking ban imposed in 1994.

== See also ==
- U.S. government and smoking cessation
- Smoking and Health: Report of the Advisory Committee to the Surgeon General of the Public Health Service
- Operation Sandblast
- Use of drugs in warfare
- Tobacco in the United States
