= Operation Golden Flow =

American post-Vietnam mandatory military drug testing

Operation Golden Flow is an unofficial term that was coined during the Nixon era for the mandatory drug testing of all military service members returning from Vietnam War, a program that was headed by Jerome Jaffe, head of the White House drug office.

== Background ==
In the late 1960s recreational drug use became popular among white middle class Americans. Drugs became representative of the counterculture movement that took place as the younger generation reacted to the conservatism of the generations before them. In the army, drugs did not only represent the era’s social rebellion; they also served as a method to artificially boost morale.

Widespread marijuana use was the first drug epidemic to hit American soldiers, as the substance was easily acquired from Vietnamese villages. Although initially marijuana was tolerated by military superiors, in January 1968 an article published in the Washingtonian magazine about marijuana use by troops led the army to place heavy restrictions on marijuana. As a result, many officers turned to heroin as their drug of choice.

When Richard Nixon was elected into office in 1969, Americans were becoming increasingly disillusioned towards the notion of the war, and, as a result, the country became deeply divided on the necessity and humanity of the war. This conflict impacted soldiers by diminishing their investment in the war, and thus they turned to drugs, particularly heroin, as a coping mechanism.

In 1970, Heroin began to enter Vietnam from Cambodia at an accelerated rate due to a Civil War in that country. By 1971, Vietnam soldiers developed an intense and widespread heroin addiction. According to one study done by The Pentagon, by 1973, up to 20% of soldiers in Vietnam used heroin habitually.

In May 1971, Nixon declared a war on drugs, and announces the creation of the Special Action Office for Drug Abuse Prevention (SAODAP), and in September 1971, operation golden flow goes into effect.

== Operation Golden Flow ==
In June 1971, the U.S. military announced that they would begin urinalysis of all returning servicemen. The program went into effect in September with favorable results that only 4.5% of the soldiers tested positive for heroin.

American soldiers in Vietnam were not permitted to board a plane home until they passed a urine drug test. If they failed, the soldiers would be forced to stay in Vietnam, undergo detoxification, and try again.

The term had evolved to mean random urinalysis testing and also nicknamed "Lemonade Party".

== Aftermath ==
Following the war, fear over soldiers returning home still harboring addiction permeated the United States. However, this anxiety proved to be misplaced, as the Special Action Office for Drug Abuse Prevention (SAODAP) found that addiction and usage rates “essentially decreased to pre-war levels” after the soldiers’ return.” Studies done during Operation Golden Flow suggested that addiction was a complicated product of how one’s environment interacts with their genes. Upon returning home, soldiers underwent a profound shift in their surroundings. The high-stress combat environment in Vietnam—marked by pervasive psychological trauma and drug accessibility—contrasted sharply with the stability of civilian life. This drastic environmental transition removed many triggers associated with wartime substance use, enabling most veterans to reintegrate without long-term addiction.
