= Go and no-go pills =

Slang for Wake/Sleeping medications

In the U.S. military, go pills and no-go pills refer to medications meant, respectively, to increase wakefulness or to induce sleepiness in order to ensure adequate alertness or rest in preparation for upcoming tasks.

== Go pill ==
A go pill refers to a wakefulness-promoting agent used for fatigue management, especially in a military combat-readiness context; this is contrasted with a no-go pill, which is used to promote sleep in support of combat operations. A go pill generally contains one of the following drugs:

- Amphetamine (methamphetamine having been used historically, such as during the Second World War), which is a strong psychostimulant drug; no longer approved officially for use by the U.S. Air Force, possibly due to safety concerns brought up in the wake of incidents like the Tarnak Farm incident.
- Modafinil, a wakefulness-promoting drug (or eugeroic)

== No-go pill ==
As of November 2012, sleeping agents approved as no-go pills by the U.S. Air Force for aircrew and AFSOC forces include:

- Temazepam (Restoril), with a 12-hour restriction on subsequent flight operation
- Zaleplon (Sonata), with a 4-hour restriction on subsequent flight operation
- Zolpidem (Ambien), with a 6-hour restriction on subsequent flight operation
