= Temmler =

German pharmaceutical company

Temmler Pharma GmbH & Co.
- Formerly: Temmler Werke; Vereinigte Chemische Fabriken H. Temmler; Preuß & Temmler AG
- Industry: Pharmaceuticals
- Founded: 1917; 109 years ago
- Headquarters: Marburg, Germany
- Key people: Directors: Werner Schneider; Matthias Utrata
- Brands: Pervitin
- Owner: Aenova Holding GmbH (since 2012)
- Number of employees: 1000 (2011)
- Website: www.temmler.de www.temmler.eu

Temmler Werke GmbH was founded in Detmold in 1917 by Hermann Temmler. The Temmler Group is a German pharmaceutical company, which focuses on the production, sale and contract production of pharmaceutical products. In 2012, the Temmler Group was taken over by the Aenova Group and with its seven production sites is one of the largest European pharmaceutical contract manufacturers.

== History ==
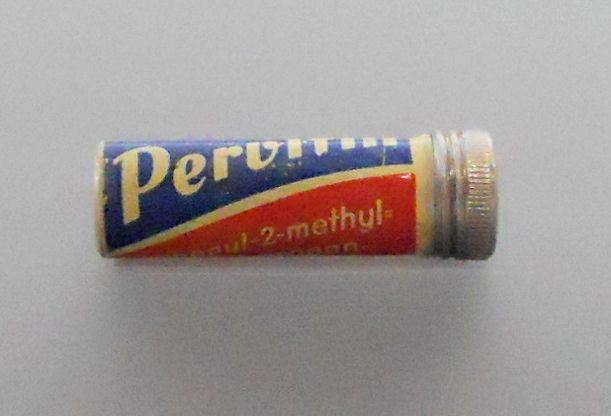
Temmler Pervitin, tablet container; the methamphetamine brand used by German soldiers during World War II.

The Temmler-Werke was founded in Detmold in 1917 by Hermann Temmler. In 1919, it merged with the Vereinigte Chemische Fabriken GmbH in Detmold to form the Vereinigten Chemischen Fabriken H. Temmler pharmaceutical company. In 1925, its headquarters was re-located to Berlin. Preparations for the treatment and alleviation of respiratory diseases became the hallmark of Temmler Pharma.

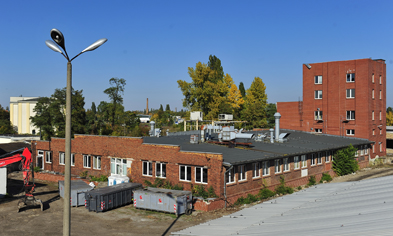
Temmler plant in Berlin-Johannisthal, production building (2015)

From 1933, the company, with expanded production facilities, concentrated its business activities exclusively around the Berlin area. In 1933–1936 Temmler (now part of Aenova Group) acquired and "aryanized" the assets of Jewish businessmen Albert Mendel and Hermann Goldberg in. Under Nazi economic persecution, Mendel and Goldberg were forced to resign from their successful Berlin-based chemicals and pharmaceutical company in April 1933. The non-Jewish managing director, Paul Preuß, informed them that he could "no longer guarantee their safety," after which Westphalian entrepreneur Theodor Temmler was brought in. By 1936, the company was fully reorganized under the non-Jewish ownership as Chemische Fabrik Tempelhof Preuß & Temmler, allowing the Nazi-favored company to quickly expand and eventually patent the stimulant Pervitin. In 1938, a Temmler chemist in Berlin synthesised Pervitin (methamphetamine hydrochloride), the pharmaceutical drug was then manufactured and dispensed over-the-counter to the public as a central nervous system and circulatory system analeptic, psychiatric performance-enhancing stimulant and to induce or extend wakefulness to treat narcolepsy. Pervitin was made available and packaged in thirty tablets for oral dosage, and in six 1 cm^{3} (0.061 in^{3}) glass ampoules for intramuscular or intravenous injection. The company became especially known for the introduction of its methamphetamine hydrochloride preparation brand Pervitin, which the company produced from 1938 up until 1988.

According to a Der Spiegel article in 2005, Nazi Germany believed that Pervitin could also help win World War II, so the German armed forces were supplied with more than 35 million Pervitin tablets, especially during Germany's "Blitzkrieg" invasion of Poland and the Battle of France during 1939 to 1940 where it was introduced to soldiers to attenuate anxiety and increase performance and concentration.

In 1945, the facility in East Berlin was occupied and disassembled. The company had to be completely reassembled in Hamburg. The company traded under the name Preuss & Temmler AG. The production facilities in East Berlin were sequestered and partially dismantled in 1945, placed under trusteeship from 1946 and expropriated in 1949.

In 1960, the whole company transferred from Hamburg to Marburg.

The Hessian state government awarded the complex, an area of about 40,000 m^{2} (430,000 ft^{2}) of production and administration facilities, a prize for functional and architectural design.

In 1967, the production and storage facilities were extended.

In 1971, a new laboratory building was erected for the manufacture of pharmaceutical dosage forms and active ingredients for controlled release. It became possible to produce medicinal products in the form of time release tablets releasing their active ingredients when required and over a longer period of time.

In 1982, these time release preparations marked the beginning of contract manufacturing, initially for foreign firms only.

Commencing 1989, the production also comprised all solid pharmaceutical dosage forms for customers at home and abroad.

In 1990, Temmler Pharma became part of the ASTA Medica group. Besides medicinal products for gastroenterology and migraine/pain, pulmology become the focal point of the preparations programme.

In 1998, Temmler Pharma took over 17 established products, thus extending its product range to include pharmaceutical preparations for the treatment of central nervous system disorders.

Since 1999, Temmler Pharma is once again a private company.

In 2004, the laboratory building was extended by adding two additional floors to 2,500 m^{2} (27,000 ft^{2}), thus laying the foundation for further growth in the field of pharmaceutical development and contract manufacturing services.

A complex comprising 1,380 m^{2} (14,900 ft^{2}) housing production facilities to meet future GMP and FDA standards was erected in 2005. Solid pharmaceutical dosage forms, such as tablets and capsules, and particularly retard formulations, are manufactured at this site.

In 2007, the acquisition of three European production sites (Germany, Ireland, Italy) from the Japanese pharmaceutical company Astellas on 1 January led to the formation of the Temmler Group, considerably extending production capacities and technological possibilities.

The Temmler Group acquires two further production sites in Feldkirchen and Bruckmühl.

In 2008, with the acquisition of the SwissCo group, based in Sisseln, Switzerland, the Temmler group further developed its competence in the processing of moisture sensitive active substances. The production of effervescent tablets is the chief work of SwissCo.

In 2012, Temmler's production facility was acquired by Aenova and Temmler's neurology products with the commercial infrastructure and pipeline being acquired by major pharmaceutical company Lupin Limited.

== See also ==
- Methamphetamine
