= History and culture of substituted amphetamines =

Amphetamine and methamphetamine are central nervous system stimulants used to treat a variety of conditions. When used recreationally, they are colloquially known as "speed" or sometimes "crank". Amphetamine was first synthesized in 1887 in Germany by Romanian chemist Lazăr Edeleanu, who named it phenylisopropylamine. Around the same time, Japanese organic chemist Nagai Nagayoshi isolated ephedrine from the Chinese ephedra plant and later developed a method for ephedrine synthesis. (Note: Ephedra spp., known as má huáng (麻黄) in Chinese, had been used as a stimulant and anti-asthmatic since the Han dynasty.) Methamphetamine was synthesized from ephedrine in 1893 by Nagayoshi. Neither drug had a pharmacological use until 1934, when Smith, Kline & French began selling amphetamine as an inhaler under the trade name Benzedrine for congestion.

During World War II, amphetamine and methamphetamine were used extensively by Allied and Axis forces for their stimulant and performance-enhancing effects. As the addictive properties of the drugs became known, governments began to place strict controls on these drugs. On October 27, 1970, with the enactment of the Controlled Substances Act, amphetamine was made a Schedule III controlled substance in the United States, but it was later moved to Schedule II. Amphetamine is currently indicated in the United States for ADHD and narcolepsy, with lisdexamfetamine (a prodrug) indicated for binge eating disorder; and methamphetamine is indicated for ADHD, though prescribed at significantly lower rates compared to amphetamine.

Despite strict government controls, recreational amphetamine and methamphetamine use is extremely prevalent worldwide. Due to the large underground market for these drugs, they are often illegally synthesized by clandestine chemists, trafficked, and sold on the black market. Based on seizures of drugs and precursor chemicals, illicit amphetamine production and trafficking is much less prevalent than that of methamphetamine.

== History of amphetamine and methamphetamine ==
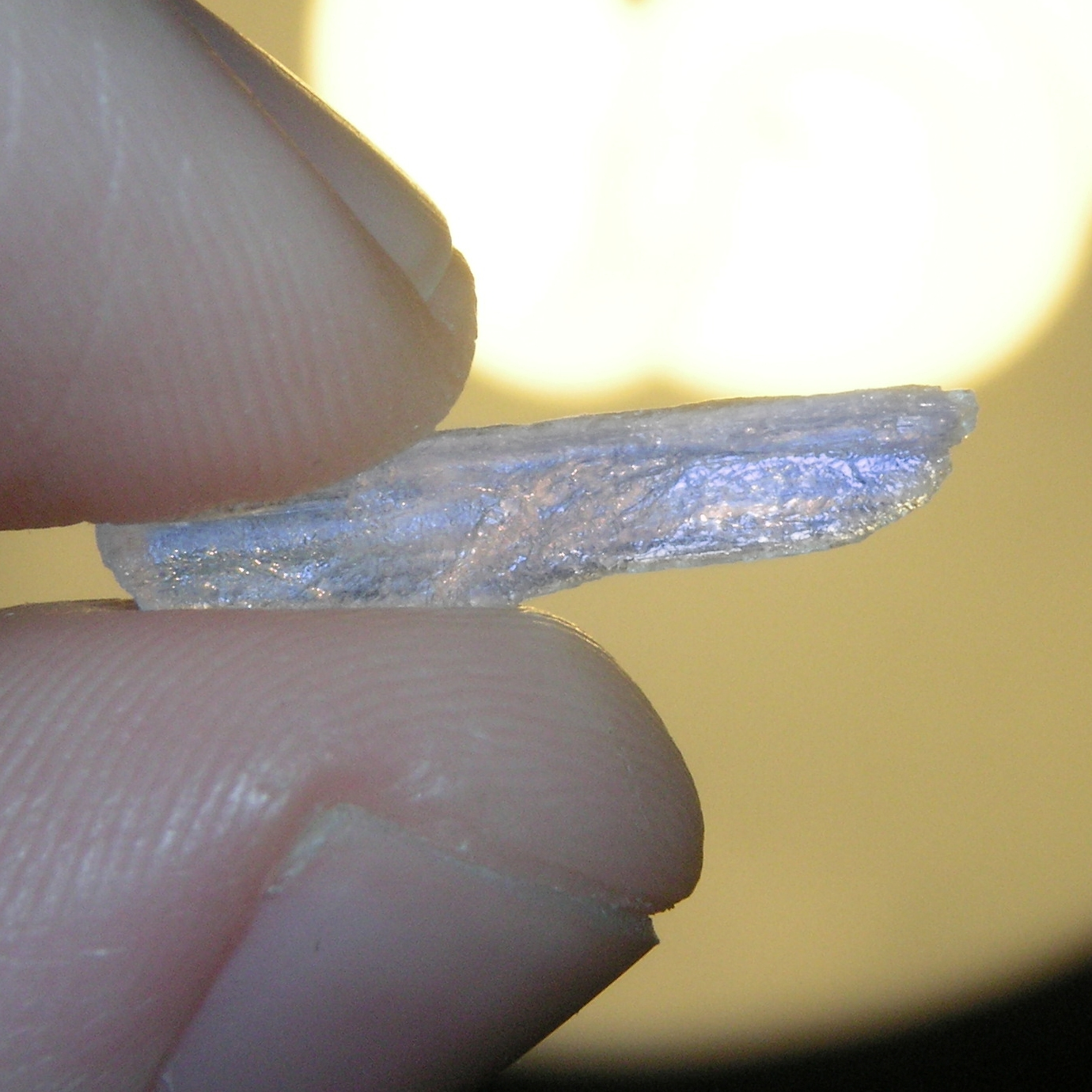
Crystal meth

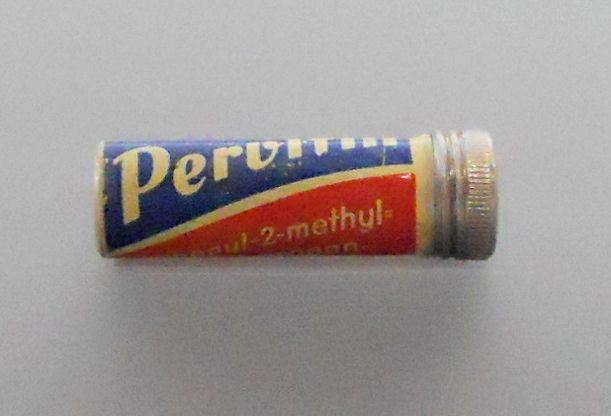
Pervitin, a methamphetamine brand used by German soldiers during World War II, was dispensed in these tablet containers.

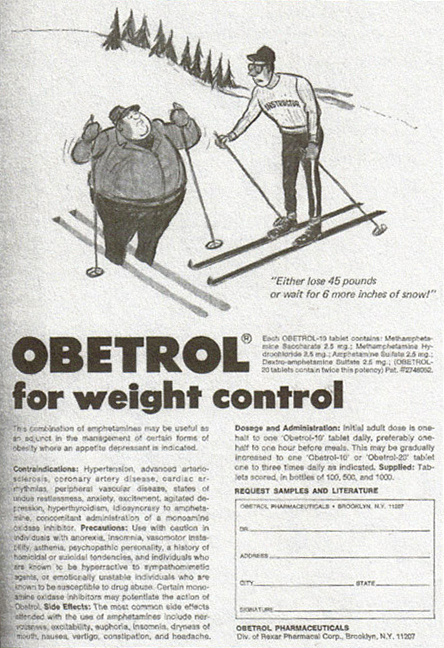
Obetrol, a pharmaceutical mixture of amphetamine and methamphetamine salts, was medically indicated and marketed for treating obesity, as illustrated in this advertisement from 1970.

Amphetamine was first synthesized in 1887 in Germany by Romanian chemist, Lazăr Edeleanu, who named the drug phenylisopropylamine. This concoction was one of a series of compounds related to the plant derivative ephedrine, which had been isolated from the Chinese ephedra plant that same year by Nagai Nagayoshi. Shortly after the first synthesis of amphetamine, Nagai synthesized methamphetamine from ephedrine in 1893. In 1919, methamphetamine hydrochloride, also known as crystal meth, was synthesized by pharmacologist Akira Ogata via reduction of ephedrine using red phosphorus and iodine. The sympathomimetic properties of amphetamine were unknown until 1927, when pioneer psychopharmacologist Gordon Alles independently resynthesized it and tested it on himself while searching for an artificial replacement for ephedrine. At the time, Alles referred to the amphetamine compound as Benzedrine, a term derived from the name benzyl-methyl carbinamine. In 1934, Smith, Kline & French made the first amphetamine pharmaceutical when they began selling a decongestant inhaler containing the volatile amphetamine free base under the trade name Benzedrine. One of the first attempts at using amphetamine in a scientific study was done by M. Nathanson, a Los Angeles physician, in 1935. He studied the subjective effects of amphetamine in 55 hospital workers who were each given 20 mg of Benzedrine. The two most commonly reported drug effects were "a sense of well being and a feeling of exhilaration" and "lessened fatigue in reaction to work".

During World War II, both the Allied and Axis forces experimented with giving amphetamine and methamphetamine to select servicemen for their stimulant and performance-enhancing effects. In the 1950s, there was a rise in the legal prescription of methamphetamine to the American public. Methamphetamine constituted half of the amphetamine salts for the original formulation for the diet drug Obetrol. Methamphetamine was also marketed for sinus inflammation or non-medicinal purposes as "pep pills" or "bennies". A thriving black market in pep pills among long-haul truck drivers in the 1950s and 1960s, linked to long drive times and intense competitive pressures within the industry, contributed to federal efforts by the late 1960s to curtail non-medical use of the substance.

Also in the 1950s, the Japanese Ministry of Health banned stimulant production, although drug companies continued to produce stimulants that wound up on the black market. From 1951 to 1954, a series of acts were passed by the Japanese government to try to stop the production and sale of stimulants; however, the production and sale of stimulant drugs continued through criminal syndicates such as Yakuza criminal organizations. On the streets, it is also known as S, Shabu, and Speed, in addition to its old trademarked name.

The United States in the 1960s saw the start of significant use of clandestinely manufactured methamphetamine, most of which was produced by motorcycle gangs. A notable part of the 1960s mod subculture in the UK was recreational amphetamine use, which was used to fuel all-night dances at clubs like Manchester's Twisted Wheel. Newspaper reports described dancers emerging from clubs at 5 a.m. with dilated pupils. Mods used the drug for stimulation and alertness, which they viewed as different from the intoxication caused by alcohol and other drugs. Dr. Andrew Wilson argues that for a significant minority, "amphetamines symbolised the smart, on-the-ball, cool image" and that they sought "stimulation not intoxication [...] greater awareness, not escape" and "confidence and articulacy" rather than the "drunken rowdiness of previous generations." Wilson argues that the significance of amphetamines to the mod culture was similar to that of LSD and cannabis within the subsequent hippie counterculture. Dick Hebdige argues that mods used amphetamines to extend their leisure time into the early hours of the morning and as a way of bridging the gap between their hostile and daunting everyday work lives and the "inner world" of dancing and dressing up in their off-hours.

After decades of reported abuse, in 1965 the United States Food and Drug Administration (USFDA) limited amphetamine to prescription use, but non-medical use remained common. Amphetamine became a schedule III controlled substance in the U.S. under the Controlled Substances Act in 1971. That same year, the United Nations enacted the Convention on Psychotropic Substances, and amphetamine became a schedule II controlled substance, a highly restrictive category under the treaty. By the 1990s, roughly 180 state parties were signatories to the treaty and consequently, it became heavily regulated in most countries. Beginning in the 1990s in the United States, the production of methamphetamine in users' own homes for personal use became popular as well.

In 1997 and 1998, researchers at Texas A&M University claimed to have found amphetamine and methamphetamine in the foliage of two Acacia species native to Texas, A. berlandieri and A. rigidula. Previously, both of these compounds had been thought to be purely synthetic. These findings have never been duplicated and consequently the validity of the report has come into question.

Substituted amphetamine use has historically been especially common among Major League Baseball players and is usually known by the slang term "greenies". In 2006, MLB banned the use of amphetamine. The ban is enforced through periodic drug-testing. However, MLB has received some criticism because the punitive consequences for amphetamine use are dramatically less severe than for anabolic steroid use, with the first offense bringing only a warning and further testing.

Methamphetamine was formerly in widespread use by truck drivers to combat symptoms of somnolence and to increase their concentration during driving, especially in the decades prior to the signing by former president Ronald Reagan of Executive Order 12564, which initiated mandatory random drug testing of all truck drivers and employees of other DOT-regulated industries.

Up to a quarter of college students use Adderall to help them focus on their studies instead of its intended purpose of helping people with ADHD. This use sometimes continues after the student graduates college due to its addictive properties.

In recent decades, amphetamines, especially Adderall, have been increasingly used by young white-collar workers who work long hours at demanding work. Many felt drug use was necessary to perform adequately. In the period following the Covid-19 pandemic prescription of ADHD medication increased by over 14%, contributing to shortages of Adderall which reach their peak during October of 2022. Young adults and women make up a notable proportion of these new prescriptions.

=== Military use ===
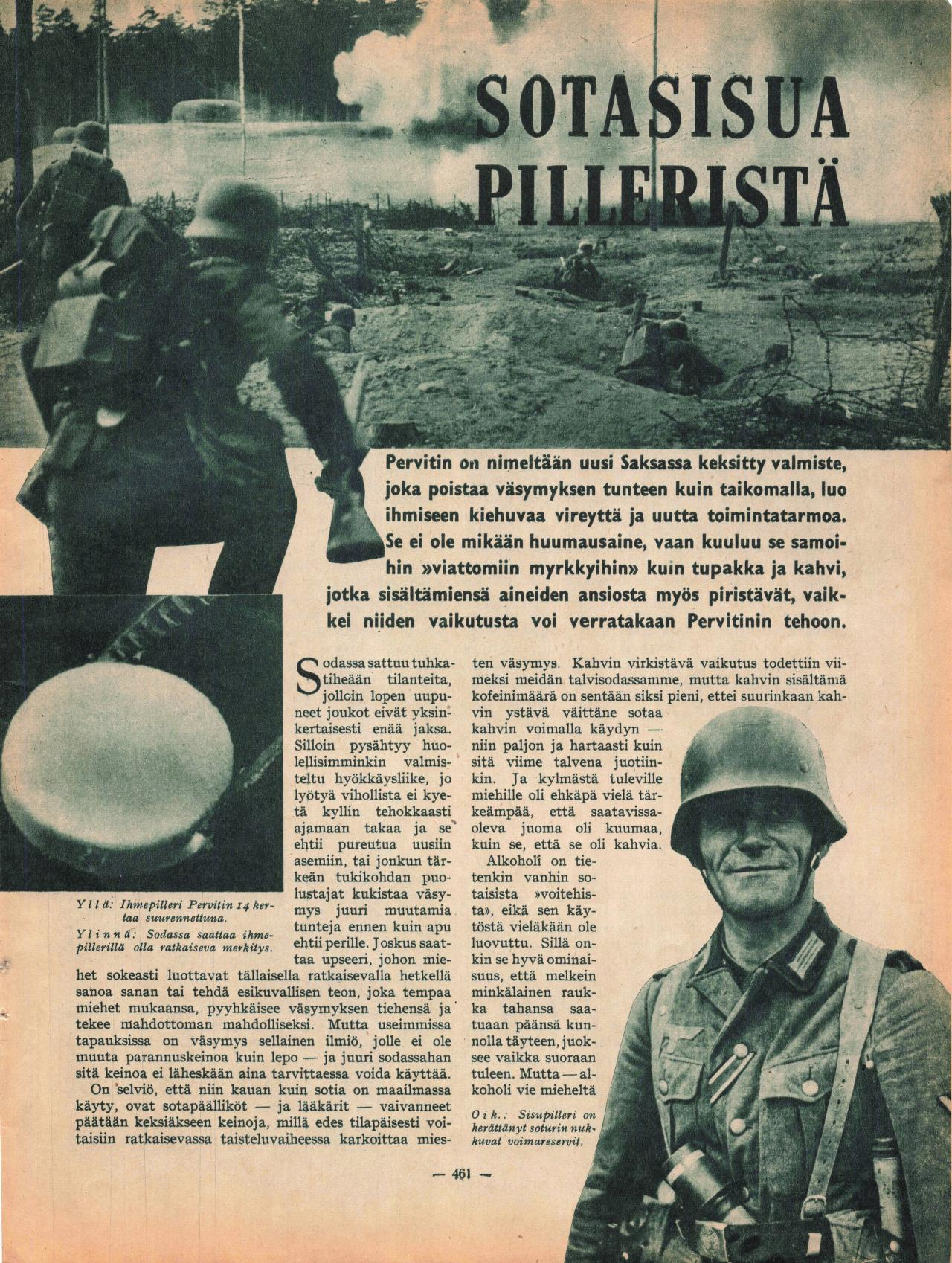
Article in the Finnish military magazine Hakkapeliitta (April 1941) praising the new German stimulant Pervitin (methamphetamine hydrochloride) as a safe sisu pill that banishes fatigue and boosts soldiers’ endurance and morale. At the time, Finland cooperated with Nazi Germany during World War II.

One of the earliest uses of amphetamine and methamphetamine was during World War II when they were used by Axis and Allied forces.

As early as 1919, Akira Ogata synthesized methamphetamine via reduction of ephedrine using red phosphorus and iodine. Later, the chemists Hauschild and Dobke from the German pharmaceutical company Temmler developed an easier method for converting ephedrine to methamphetamine. As a result, Temmler could market it on a large scale as a nonprescription drug under the trade name Pervitin (methamphetamine hydrochloride). Pervitin was commonly used by the German and Finnish militaries. Adolf Hitler is rumored to have begun using amphetamine occasionally after 1937, and to have become addicted to it in late 1942; although this is disputed by historians who argue he was suffering from health issues.

It was widely distributed across German military ranks and divisions, from elite forces to tank crews and aircraft personnel, with millions of tablets being distributed for its stimulant effects and to induce extended wakefulness.

More than 35 million three-milligram doses of Pervitin were manufactured for the German army and air force between April and July 1940; however, this amounts to only three tablets per serviceman a month. Use of Pervitin was restricted by the Wehrmacht and Nazi Germany as a whole under the Opium Law, which required the drug be obtained through a physician's prescription.

After April 1941 the drug was no longer distributed to servicemen on a mass scale due to its dangerous side effects, and several deaths were attributed to Pervitin. Use continued albeit closely monitored. In the military, Pervitin was discouraged during combat due to its negative side effects. It was more commonly abused behind the front lines.

Despite the new controls, authorities observed that Pervitin consumption rose rapidly, and so did civilian production, from about seven and a half million tablets in 1941 to nine million tablets in 1942 and a similar amount the following year, to eight million tablets in 1944. As a rule, military production was about half of civilian production. These numbers can be misleading as Nazi Germany had a population of over 80 million during the war. Individuals acquired only small numbers of doses at a time and were required to report usage to the authorities.

In Japan, methamphetamine was sold under the registered trademark of Philopon by Dainippon Pharmaceuticals (present-day Dainippon Sumitomo Pharma [DSP]) for civilian and military use. It has been estimated that one billion Philopon pills were produced between 1939 and 1945. As with the rest of the world at the time, the side effects of methamphetamine were not well studied, and regulation was not seen as necessary. In the 1940s and 1950s, the drug was widely administered to Japanese industrial workers to increase their productivity. In Finland, Pervitin was colloquially known as höökipulveri ("pep powder"). Its use was essentially restricted to special forces, especially to long-range commandos.

Amphetamine was also given to Allied bomber pilots during World War II to sustain them by fighting off fatigue and enhancing focus during long flights. During the Persian Gulf War, amphetamine became the drug of choice for American bomber pilots, being used voluntarily by roughly half of U.S. Air Force pilots. The Tarnak Farm incident during the War in Afghanistan (2001-21), in which an American F-16 pilot killed several friendly Canadian soldiers on the ground, was blamed by the pilot on his use of amphetamine. A nonjudicial (UCMJ Article 15) U.S. Air Force hearing rejected the pilot's claim.

The USAF banned the use of dextroamphetamine, and due to amphetamines' addiction potential in some people, newer wakefulness-promoting drugs such as modafinil have been seen as possible safer alternatives for military use (as a go pill) in some countries, including the United States.

== Society and culture ==
=== In television ===
AMC's Breaking Bad, a crime drama series revolving around the large-scale illicit production of methamphetamine, has been lauded by critics and audiences alike for its realist approach to the portrayal of the international drug trade. It has also been called a "contemporary western" by the series creator Vince Gilligan.

=== In literature ===
The writers and poets of the Beat Generation used amphetamine extensively, mainly under the racemic Benzedrine brand name. Jack Kerouac was a particularly avid user of amphetamine, which was said to provide him with the stamina needed to work on his novels for extended periods.

In 1965, beat writer Allen Ginsberg, a member of the hippie counterculture, which was very critical of substituted amphetamines, did an interview with the Los Angeles Free Press in which he commented that "Speed is antisocial, paranoid making, it's a drag... all the nice gentle dope fiends are getting screwed up by the real horror monster Frankenstein speed freaks who are going round stealing and bad-mouthing everybody". However, he also acknowledged that he had used speed to stay up all night writing.

Amphetamine is frequently mentioned in the works of American gonzo journalist Hunter S. Thompson, likely due to him mainly using Dexedrine for his writing process from 1964 to about 1974; before he began to write mostly under the influence of cocaine. "Speed" not only appears among the inventory of drugs Thompson consumed for what could broadly be defined as recreational purposes but also receives frequent, explicit mention as an essential component of his writing toolkit, such as in his "Author's Note" in Fear and Loathing on the Campaign Trail '72.

One afternoon about three days ago [the publishers] showed up at my door with no warning, and loaded about forty pounds of supplies into the room: two cases of Mexican beer, four quarts of gin, a dozen grapefruits, and enough speed to alter the outcome of six Super Bowls. ... Meanwhile, [...] with the final chapter still unwritten and the presses scheduled to start rolling in twenty-four hours [...] unless somebody shows up pretty soon with extremely powerful speed, there might not be a final chapter. About four fingers of king-hell Crank would do the trick, but I am not optimistic.

In the second part of Hubert Selby Jr.'s 1964 novel Last Exit to Brooklyn The Queen Is Dead, Georgette, a transgender prostitute, dies of a drug overdose after the benzedrine-driven party. Also, Hubert Selby Jr.'s 1978 novel Requiem for a Dream involves one of the main characters, a widowed mother named Sara Goldfarb, getting prescribed amphetamine diet pills in order to lose weight. As she waits for a call back from the casting company for her dream TV show appearance, she slowly gets more addicted to the pills. She eventually develops amphetamine psychosis and is committed to a mental institution, where she undergoes ECT for her dissociative symptoms. These scenes were portrayed in the 2000 adaptation of the same name, where Sara is played by Ellen Burstyn.

Philip K. Dick was known to frequently use amphetamines, writing many of his novels under the drug's influence. His addiction may have exacerbated his mental health problems and contributed to his early death. Drugs feature in many of his novels, notably A Scanner Darkly and The Three Stigmata of Palmer Eldritch, though in both cases Dick writes of fictional drugs without specifically mentioning amphetamines.

Scottish author Irvine Welsh often portrays drug use in his novels, though in one of his journalism works he comments on how drugs (including amphetamine) have become part of consumerism and how his novels Trainspotting and Porno reflect the changes in drug use and culture during the years that elapsed between the two texts.

Millennial writers, such as Tao Lin and Megan Boyle, have used amphetamines in the form of Adderall heavily. Lin wrote about using Adderall in his novel Taipei. Boyle in her novel Liveblog. Both writers used amphetamines themselves while writing the aforementioned books. Boyle appeared to have abused Adderall to the point of psychosis and was at one point heavily addicted. A publisher of Tyrant Books called it "one of the most personally honest books ever written" where she documented this difficult period of her life online to hold herself accountable to destructive behavior.

Author Tom Joad writes speculative fiction about a US President in cognitive decline, whose staff and cabinet manage him with Adderall in order to run the nation for their own nefarious benefit.

=== In music ===
The northern soul and mod subcultures in England were known for their characteristic amphetamine use. Their concerts generally involved people taking amphetamines to keep dancing all night. DJ Roger Eagle got out of the northern soul scene, saying: "All they wanted was fast-tempo black dance music... [but they were] too blocked on amphetamines to articulate exactly which Jackie Wilson record they wanted me to play."

Many rock songs have been written about amphetamine. For example, in the track entitled "St. Ides Heaven" from singer/songwriter, Elliott Smith's self-titled album. "Semi Charmed Life" by Third Eye Blind explicitly references methamphetamine as does "Geek Stink Breath" by Green Day. Other examples include the song "Amphetamine" by Alternative rock band Everclear, "Amphetamine" by Three Souls in My Mind, "20 Dollar Nose Bleed" by the pop-rock band Fall Out Boy, and "Headfirst For Halos" by My Chemical Romance. Amphetamine has influenced the aesthetics of many rock and roll bands (especially in the garage rock, mod R&B, death rock, punk/hardcore, gothic rock and extreme metal genres). Hüsker Dü, Jesus and Mary Chain and The Who were keen amphetamine users in their early existences. The Beatles were said to be extensive users of phenmetrazine in their early days, something they have widely discussed in interviews over the years. Hollywood Undead references the negative effects of substituted amphetamines in the song "City" from their album Swan Songs. The Red Hot Chili Peppers mentioned Benzedrine in their song 'Wet Sand' from the album Stadium Arcadium.

Primus's songs "On the Tweek Again" and "Those Damned Blue-Collar Tweekers" directly reference widespread amphetamine use in rural America. Land Speed Record is an allusion to Hüsker Dü's amphetamine use. Amphetamine was widely abused in the 1980s underground punk-rock scene. Punk-rock band NOFX have incorporated references to amphetamines and other stimulants, the two most obvious being the song "Three on Speed" from the Surfer 8-inch LP (in reference to the three guys being on amphetamine while recording the album), and the album The Longest Line is in reference to a "line" of amphetamine ready for insufflation.

The Rolling Stones referenced the drug in their song "Can't You Hear Me Knocking" on the album Sticky Fingers ("Y'all got cocaine eyes / Yeah, ya got speed-freak jive now"). Lou Reed refers explicitly to the drug on his album Berlin, in the song "How Do You Think It Feels?". Reed's band The Velvet Underground, a creation of Andy Warhol's Factory Years, was fueled by amphetamines, as well as naming their second album White Light/White Heat after the drug. The Pulp song "Sorted for E's & Wizz" refers to British slang terms for ecstasy and amphetamines. English gothic rock band The Sisters of Mercy refers to the drug in their song "Amphetamine Logic" from their first album, First and Last and Always, and their singer Andrew Eldritch is associated with amphetamine use. The Byrds referenced amphetamines in the 1968 song "Artificial Energy" on the album The Notorious Byrd Brothers. Bob Dylan's song "Just Like a Woman" includes the line "her fog, her amphetamine, and her pearls."

Many rock and roll bands have named themselves after amphetamine and the drug slang and drug culture surrounding it. For example, Mod revivalists The Purple Hearts named themselves after the amphetamine tablets popular with mods during the 1960s, as did the Australian band of the same name during the mid-1960s. The Amphetameanies, a ska-punk band, are also named after amphetamine, but hint at its effects in their musical style. Dexys Midnight Runners, of number-one hit "Come On Eileen", are named after "dexies", a slang term for the amphetamine Dexedrine. Motörhead derived their name from the song of the same name by Ian "Lemmy" Kilmister's earlier band, Hawkwind; the song is about a user of speed, a "motorhead".

Danny Brown's album XXX contains many references to Adderall, such as the song "Adderall Admiral".

=== In film ===
Producer David O. Selznick, an amphetamine user, would often dictate long and rambling memos to his directors under the influence of amphetamine. The documentary Shadowing The Third Man relates that Selznick introduced The Third Man director Carol Reed to the use of amphetamine, which allowed Reed to bring the picture in below budget and on schedule by filming nearly 22 hours at a time.

The title of the 2009 movie Amphetamine plays on the double meaning of the word in Chinese. Besides the name for the drug, it also means "isn't this his fate?" which figuratively ties to the movie's plot. The word is transliterated as 安 非 他 命—"ān fēi tā mìng"—and as commonly happens with transliteration of non-Chinese terms each character has independent meaning as an individual unrelated word.

In the second scene of the 2011 movie Drive (at 1:50) the auto mechanic shop owner played by Bryan Cranston delivers the following line to the Driver played by Ryan Gosling; "ya look like a zombie kid are yuh gettin any sleep, can I offer you some benzedrine, dexedrine, caffeine, nicotine" mirroring the title of the Jerry Reed song "Benzedrine, Caffeine, Nicotine, (Wish Me Luck)." Jerry Reed played the sidekick of the Burt Reynolds outlaw driver in the 1977 road rage film Smokey and the Bandit.

=== In mathematics ===
Perhaps the most notable example of this is Paul Erdős, one of the most prolific and successful mathematicians in human history. He took amphetamine and methylphenidate occasionally throughout his early career. He began taking them daily at age 58, when a doctor prescribed them to him to allay the depression associated with his mother's death and didn't stop until his death at age 83. He would also sustain himself on copious amounts of coffee and caffeine pills. Erdős took amphetamine despite the concern of his friends, one of whom (Ron Graham) bet him $500 that he could not stop taking the drug for a month. Erdős won the bet, but complained:

You've showed me I'm not an addict. But I didn't get any work done. I'd get up in the morning and stare at a blank piece of paper. I'd have no ideas, just like an ordinary person. You've set mathematics back a month.

He then promptly resumed his amphetamine use.

== Illicit drug culture ==
Addiction experts in psychiatry, chemistry, pharmacology, forensic science, epidemiology, and the police and legal services engaged in delphic analysis regarding 20 popular recreational drugs. Amphetamine was ranked 8th in dependence, 6th in physical harm, and 9th in social harm.

=== Adderall in the video gaming industry ===
Adderall use in the video gaming industry has been receiving more and more attention in recent years. Many gamers have admitted to using it and have claimed that it has become a very widespread issue. Some gamers have even claimed that pills are regularly sold at professional tournaments. Adderall is peculiarly well suited to the medium, where victory depends on a competitor's alertness, ability to concentrate, and hand-to-eye coordination. As one StarCraft player wrote in 2011 on the game's official forums: "Adderall is basically a stimpack for gamers."

The Electronic Sports League said that it would test players for performance-enhancing drugs starting at a tournament in August 2015. ESL said it would work with two international agencies – the same ones that help oversee anti-doping policies for the Olympics and other sports – to create anti-doping guidelines and a testing program for players. "We want to create a level playing field for all competitors and maintain the integrity of the sport," said James Lampkin, vice president of professional gaming at ESL. In addition to the ESL, Major League Gaming has spoken up. Bruce Dugan, a spokesman for Major League Gaming, said that the organization's policies prohibit the use of performance-enhancing drugs. However, the league has never conducted drug tests of its players. "Now that a lot of attention is being paid, it's something we'll look at for the 2016 season," spokesman Bruce Dugan said.

=== Amphetamines in higher education ===
Non-medical use of amphetamines in higher education has seen a large increase in popularity. College and other higher education students have reported using amphetamines for many different purposes such as partying, self-medication, and the most common being studying. Since amphetamine use is illicit in most countries, the off-label use by students is often regarded as a major issue by most governmental institutions. In the United States, amphetamine is classified by the DEA as a Schedule II controlled substance, which carries serious civil, criminal, and collateral consequences under federal law. Amphetamine's classification as Schedule II means it has a "high potential for abuse and could lead to psychological or physical dependence." Despite this, the trend in the use of amphetamines (both prescription and illicit) has increased steadily over time.

=== Recreational use ===
Both amphetamine and methamphetamine are used recreationally as euphoriants and aphrodisiacs, with methamphetamine being the more common recreational drug due to precursor availability and relative ease to manufacture. According to a National Geographic TV documentary on methamphetamine, "an entire subculture known as party and play is based around methamphetamine use." Members of this drug-based subculture, which consists almost entirely of homosexual male methamphetamine users located in San Francisco, will typically meet up through internet dating sites and have sex. Due to its strong stimulant and aphrodisiac effects and inhibitory effect on ejaculation, with repeated use, these sexual encounters will sometimes occur continuously for several days. The crash following the use of methamphetamine in this manner is very often severe, with marked hypersomnia.

==== Slang terms ====
Slang terms for methamphetamine, especially common among illicit drug users, are numerous and vary from region to region. Some names are crystal meth, meth, speed, crystal, ice, ice cream, shards, shabu or shaboo, side, glass, gak, jib, crank, batu, tweak, piko, rock, tina, fast, pep, yaba, and cold. Terms vary by region, subculture, and individual preference; some of these regional and local names include: Philopon in East Asia, P in New Zealand, "ya ba" (Thai for "Crazy Medicine") in Thailand, bato (Filipino for rock or stone) in the Philippines, angel delight in Scotland, and tik in South Africa. Vint, Russian for "a screw", refers to a very impure homemade form of methamphetamine in Russia. In Thailand and Myanmar, ya ba pills have many slang terms, "WY", such as "Athee" (Burmese for fruit), and "88". In Sweden tjack is a common slang term.

==== Administration ====
Inhalation (informally, "smoking") of free base forms of amphetamine and methamphetamine is the fastest route of administration, although drug injection (i.e. intravenous administration) results in the quickest rise in blood concentration. This is followed by suppository, insufflation, and oral administration.

===== Inhalation =====
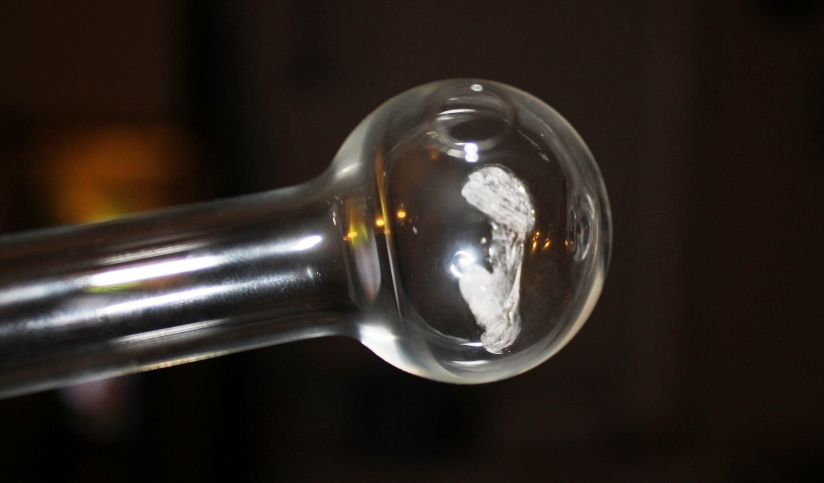
Base pipe used for smoking methamphetamine

Crystal methamphetamine (most commonly, colloquially known as "crystal meth" or "ice") and free base forms of amphetamine are sufficiently volatile substances and this allows them to be vaporized by high heat (i.e. using a lighter) and the fumes are inhaled (or "smoked") from glass paraphernalia known as base pipes (most commonly, colloquially referred to as "bubble", "bowl", "globe" or simply "pipe").

People who use stimulants, including methamphetamines, have historically been excluded from both the medical model and harm reduction programs, which primarily treat injection opioid users and people with alcohol use disorders.

The National Drug Strategy Household Survey 2016 by the Australian Institute of Health and Welfare revealed that smoking is an increasingly favored route of administration among methamphetamine users in Australia. The National Drug Strategy Household Survey 2019 suggests overall rates of methamphetamine use have declined over recent years, but among those who do use methamphetamine, 'ice' is the more popular form of the drug, and those who use 'ice' (as opposed to other forms of methamphetamine) are more likely to use it more regularly.

Ya ba (a pill containing caffeine and methamphetamine) smokers often use a technique in which a ya ba pill is placed on aluminium foil that is heated underneath with a lighter, in turn vaporizing the pill so that it can be inhaled through a heat-resistant pipe. This method of administration is sometimes referred to as "chasing the dragon".

===== Injection =====
Drug injection via intravenous administration, intramuscular administration, or subcutaneous administration carries relatively greater risks than other methods of administration. The doses used by recreational intravenous users vary widely, with a range of 1–200 times the doses used therapeutically (i.e., up to several grams). Intravenous users risk developing pulmonary embolism (PE), a blockage of the main artery of the lung or one of its branches, and commonly develop skin rashes or infections at the site of injection. As with the injection of any drug, if a group of users share a common needle without sterilization procedures, blood-borne diseases, such as HIV or hepatitis, can be transmitted.

A 2017 study involving fifty six female clients were interviewed by Nicholas E. Goeders of Louisiana State University suggests that the subjective rush from recreational methamphetamine use is proportional to the rate at which the blood level of the drug increases. Consequently, a rapid onset of action increases the risk of psychological dependence/addiction independently of other risk factors, such as dosage and frequency of use. Goeders concluded that "Without a doubt methamphetamine, when injected in "sufficient" purity and dose, can produce a subjective physiological response in women that is indistinguishable from an orgasm."

===== Insufflation =====
Crystal methamphetamine and salts of amphetamine are sometimes powdered and insufflated by recreational users, which results in a fairly rapid uptake of the drug through the nasal epithelium; with regular use, amphetamine or methamphetamine insufflation slowly damages and eventually destroys the nasal septum due to their causticity and vasoconstrictive effects.

===== Rectal and vaginal =====
Rectal administration and intravaginal administration are less popular drug routes in the community with comparatively little research into their effects. Information on their use is largely anecdotal with reports of increased sexual pleasure and the effects of the drug lasting longer, though as methamphetamine is centrally active in the brain, these effects are likely experienced through the higher bioavailability of the drug in the bloodstream and the faster onset of action than many other routes of administration. Nicknames for the routes of administration within some methamphetamine communities include a "butt rocket", a "booty bump", "potato thumping", "turkey basting", "plugging", "booty-whaap", "boofing", "suitcasing", "hooping", "keistering", "shafting", "bumming", and "shelving" (vaginal).

=== Illegal synthesis ===
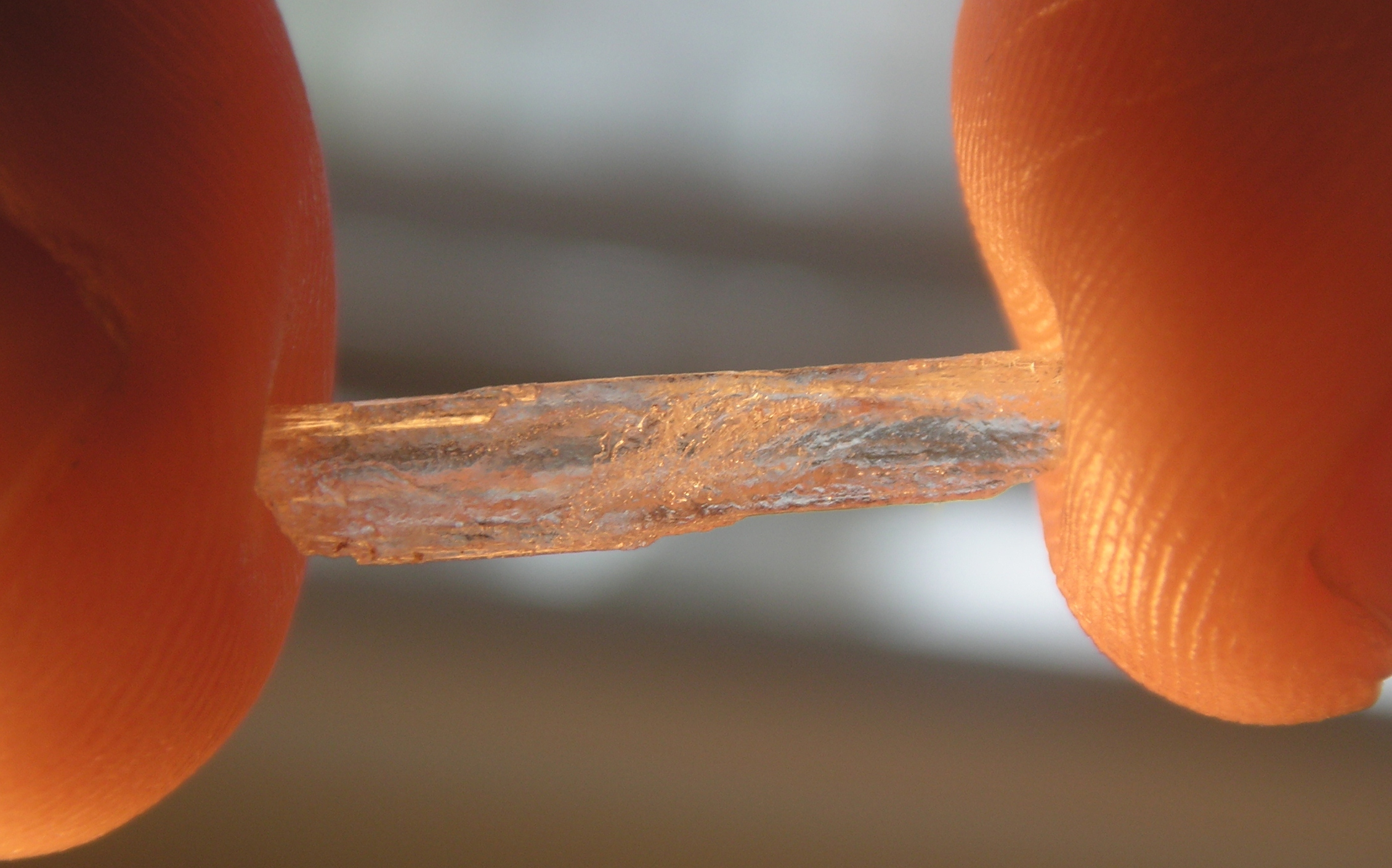
Illicitly synthesized crystal methamphetamine

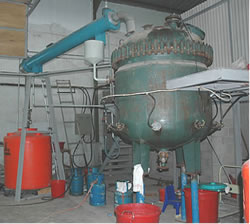
Illicit industrial-scale methamphetamine and MDMA chemical factory (Cikande, Indonesia)

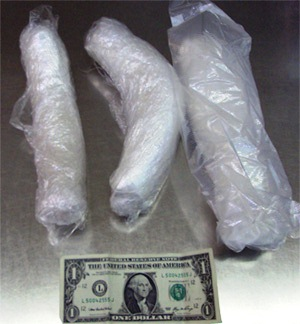
1 pound (0.45 kg) of methamphetamine found on a passenger at LA International Airport (LAX)

Methamphetamine is most structurally similar to amphetamine. Synthesis is relatively simple but entails risk with flammable and corrosive chemicals, particularly the solvents used in extraction and purification. The six major routes of production begin with either phenyl-2-propanone (P2P) or with one of the isomeric compounds pseudoephedrine and ephedrine.

One procedure uses the reductive amination of phenylacetone with methylamine, P2P was usually obtained from phenylacetic acid and acetic anhydride, and phenylacetic acid might arise from benzaldehyde, benzylcyanide, or benzylchloride. Methylamine is crucial to all such methods and is produced from the model airplane fuel nitromethane, or formaldehyde and ammonium chloride, or methyl iodide with hexamine. This was once the preferred method of production by motorcycle gangs in California, until DEA restrictions on the chemicals made the process difficult. Pseudoephedrine, ephedrine, phenylacetone, and phenylacetic acid are currently DEA list I, and acetic anhydride is list II on the DEA list of chemicals subject to regulation and control measures. This method can involve the use of mercuric chloride and leaves behind mercury and lead environmental wastes. The methamphetamine produced by this method is racemic, consisting partly of the less-desired levomethamphetamine isomer, though separation of the two enantiomeric forms through selective recrystallization of the tartrate salt can occur in order to isolate the more active dextromethamphetamine.

The alternative Leuckart route also relies on P2P to produce a racemic product, but proceeds via methylformamide in formic acid to an intermediate N-formyl-methamphetamine, which is then decarboxylated with hydrochloric acid.

Illicit methamphetamine is more commonly made by the reduction of ephedrine or pseudoephedrine, which produces the more active d-methamphetamine isomer. The maximum conversion rate for ephedrine and pseudoephedrine is 92%, although typically, illicit methamphetamine laboratories convert at a rate of 50% to 75%. Most methods of illicit production involve protonation of the hydroxyl group on the ephedrine or pseudoephedrine molecule.

Though dating back to the discovery of the drug, the Nagai route did not become popular among illicit manufacturers until c.1982 and comprised 20% of production in Michigan in 2002. It involves red phosphorus and hydrogen iodide (also known as hydroiodic acid or iohydroic acid). (The hydrogen iodide is replaced by iodine and water in the "Moscow route".) The hydrogen iodide is used to reduce either ephedrine or pseudoephedrine to methamphetamine. On heating, the precursor is rapidly iodinated by the hydrogen iodide to form iodoephedrine. The phosphorus assists in the second step, by consuming iodine to form phosphorus triiodide (which decomposes in water to phosphorous acid, regenerating hydrogen iodide). Because hydrogen iodide exists in a chemical equilibrium with iodine and hydrogen, the phosphorus reaction shifts the balance toward hydrogen production when iodine is consumed (see Le Châtelier's principle). In Australia, criminal groups have been known to substitute "red" phosphorus with either hypophosphorous acid or phosphorous acid (the "Hypo route"). This is a hazardous process for amateur chemists because phosphine gas, a side-product from in situ hydrogen iodide production, is extremely toxic to inhale. The reaction can also create toxic, flammable white phosphorus waste. Methamphetamine produced in this way is usually more than 95% pure.

The conceptually similar Emde route involves the reduction of ephedrine to chloroephedrine using thionyl chloride (SOCl_{2}), followed by catalytic hydrogenation. The catalysts for this reaction are palladium or platinum. The Rosenmund route also uses hydrogen gas and a palladium catalyst poisoned with barium sulfate (Rosenmund reduction), but uses perchloric acid instead of thionyl chloride.

The Birch reduction, also called the "Nazi method", became popular in the mid-to-late 1990s and comprised the bulk of methamphetamine production in Michigan in 2002. It reacts pseudoephedrine with liquid anhydrous ammonia and an alkali metal such as sodium or lithium. The reaction is allowed to stand until the ammonia evaporates. However, the Birch reduction is dangerous because the alkali metal and ammonia are both extremely reactive, and the temperature of liquid ammonia makes it susceptible to explosive boiling when reactants are added. It has been the most popular method in Midwestern states of the U.S. because of the ready availability of liquid ammonia fertilizer in farming regions.

In recent years, a simplified "Shake 'n Bake" one-pot synthesis has become more popular. The method is suitable for such small batches that pseudoephedrine restrictions are less effective, it uses chemicals that are easier to obtain (though no less dangerous than traditional methods), and it is so easy to carry out that some chemists have synthesized the substance while driving. It involves placing crushed pseudoephedrine tablets into a nonpressurized container containing ammonium nitrate, water, and a hydrophobic solvent such as Coleman fuel or automotive starting fluid, to which lye and lithium (from lithium batteries) is added. The container needs to be "burped" periodically to prevent failure under accumulating pressure. The battery lithium can react with water to shatter a container and potentially start a fire or explosion. Hydrogen chloride gas produced by a reaction of salt with sulfuric acid is then used to recover crystals for purification.

==== Illegal laboratories ====
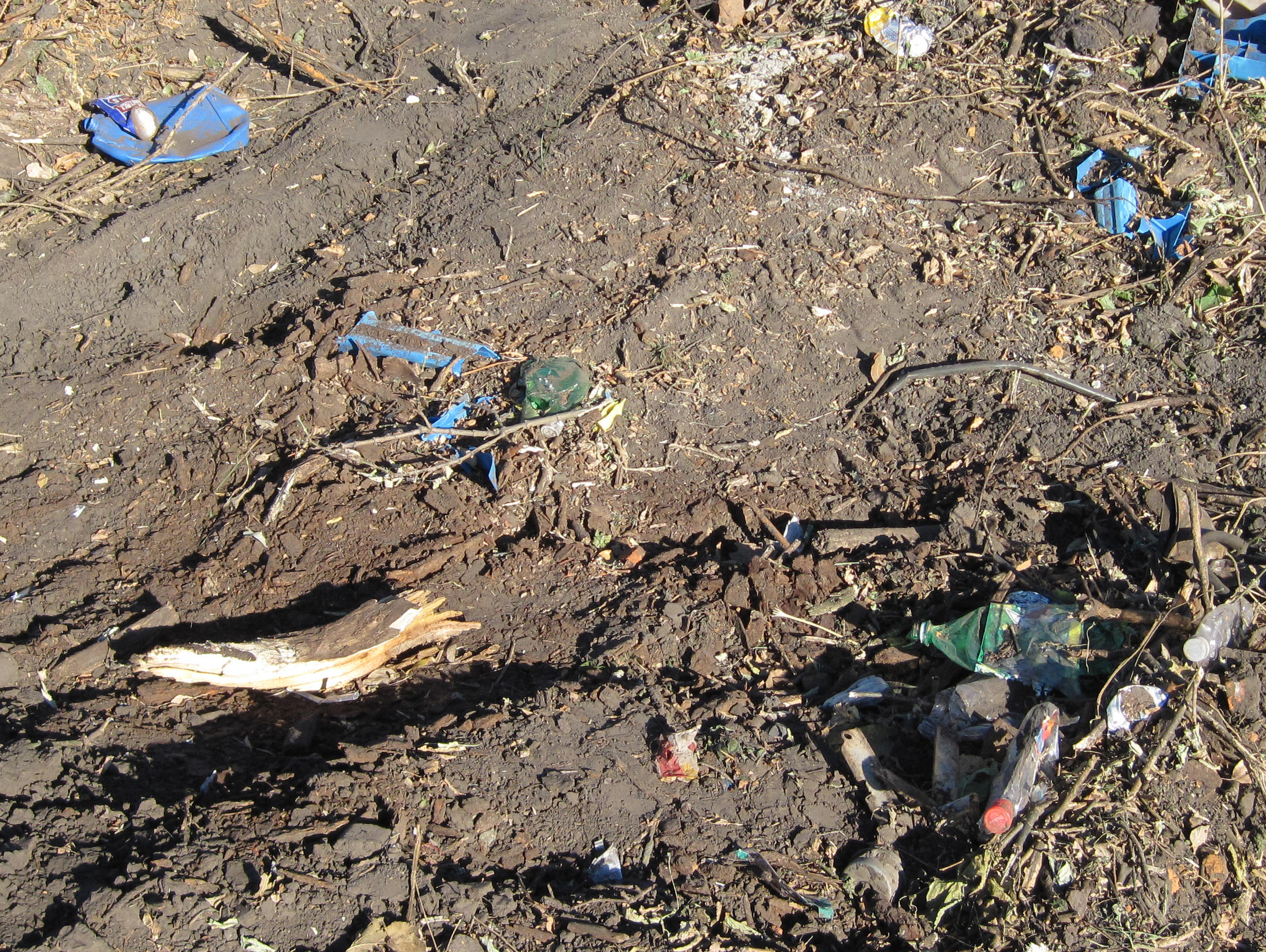
Waste left behind from a methamphetamine lab

Short-term exposure to high concentrations of chemical vapors that exist in black-market methamphetamine laboratories can cause severe health problems and death. Exposure to these substances can occur from volatile air emissions, spills, fires, and explosions. Such methamphetamine labs are sometimes discovered when emergency personnel respond to fires due to improper handling of volatile or flammable materials. Single-pot "shake and bake" syntheses are particularly prone to explode and ignite, and, when abandoned, still pose a severe hazard to firefighters. Ingredients involved in synthesizing methamphetamine products illicitly (and seldom amphetamine as well) may be carcinogens, flammable, prone to react violently and explode with great force, or corrosive, as well as the compounds used to synthesize the aforementioned ingredients.

Methamphetamine cooks, their families, and first responders are at high risk of experiencing acute health effects from chemical exposure, including lung damage and chemical burns to the body. After the seizure of a methamphetamine lab, a low exposure risk to chemical residues often exists, but this contamination can be sanitized. Chemical residues and lab wastes that are left behind at a former methamphetamine lab can cause severe health problems for people who use the property.

==== Impurities and adulterants ====
In Japan, methamphetamine seizures are usually white crystals of high purity, but contain impurities that vary according to the means of production, and are sometimes adulterated.

Diagnostic impurities are the naphthalenes 1-benzyl-methylnaphthalene and 1,3-dimethyl-2-phenylnaphthalene, arising in the Nagai and Leuckart routes, and cis- or trans- 1,2-dimethyl-3-phenylaziridine, ephedrine, or erythro-3,4-dimethyl- 5-phenyloxazolidine, arising in the Nagai and Emde routes; these are absent in the reductive amination route. Characteristic impurities of the Birch route include N-methyl-1-(1-(1,4-cyclohexadienyl))-2-propanamine. Methamphetamine produced by the Birch route contains phenyl-2-propanone, the precursor for the reductive amination route, as a degradation product. However, specific diagnostic impurities are not very reliable in practice, and it is generally preferable for forensic technicians to evaluate a larger profile of trace compounds.

A common adulterant is dimethyl sulfone, a solvent and cosmetic base without known effect on the nervous system; other adulterants include dimethylamphetamine HCl, ephedrine HCl, sodium thiosulfate, sodium chloride, sodium glutamate, and a mixture of caffeine with sodium benzoate.

In the United States, illicit methamphetamine comes in a variety of forms with prices varying widely over time. Most commonly, it is found as a colorless crystalline solid. Impurities may result in a brownish or tan color. Colorful flavored pills containing methamphetamine and caffeine are known as ya ba (Thai for "crazy medicine").

An impure form of methamphetamine is sold as a crumbly brown or off-white rock, commonly referred to as "peanut butter crank". It may be diluted or cut with non-psychoactive substances like inositol, isopropylbenzylamine or dimethylsulfone. Another popular method is to combine methamphetamine with other stimulant substances, such as caffeine or cathine, into a pill known as a "Kamikaze", which can be particularly dangerous due to the synergistic effects of multiple stimulants. Reports in 2007 of the appearance of flavored "Strawberry Quik meth" circulated in the media and local law enforcement, but were debunked in 2010 by the DEA, although meth of varying colors has been seized.

Rarely, the impure reaction mixture from the hydrogen iodide/red phosphorus route is used without further modification, usually by injection; it is called "ox blood". "Meth oil" refers to the crude methamphetamine base produced by several synthesis procedures. Ordinarily, it is purified by exposure to hydrogen chloride, as a solution or as a bubbled gas, and extraction of the resulting salt occurs by precipitation and/or recrystallization with ether/acetone.

=== Trafficking and distribution ===
Until the early 1990s, the U.S. market for methamphetamine was supplied mostly by labs run by drug traffickers in both Mexico and California. As of 2007, drug and lab seizure data suggest that approximately 80% of the methamphetamine used in the United States originates from larger laboratories operated by Mexican-based syndicates on both sides of the border; approximately 20 percent comes from small toxic labs (STLs) in the United States. The 2006 National Drug Threat Assessment, produced by the Department of Justice, found "decreased domestic methamphetamine production in both small and large-scale laboratories." It also noted a decline in domestic methamphetamine manufacture which was replaced by an increase in illicit Mexican production.

As of February 2023, the Sinaloa Cartel is the most active drug cartel involved in smuggling methamphetamine and other illicit drugs into the United States and trafficking wholesale quantities throughout the United States.

== See also ==
- Breaking Bad – television series involving the criminal production of methamphetamine
- Faces of Meth
- Methamphetamine in the United States
- Montana Meth Project
- Rolling meth lab
