= Blue star tattoo legend =

Drug urban legend

The recurring "Blue Star Acid" warning.

The blue star tattoo legend is an urban legend which states that a temporary lick-and-stick tattoo soaked in LSD and made in the form of a blue star, or of popular children's cartoon characters, is being distributed to unknowing children in any given area.

== Propagation ==
The legend commonly surfaces in American elementary and middle schools in the form of a flyer which is distributed to parents by concerned school officials. In the past it was often in the form of poor quality photocopy, clearly many generations old, but it has now also become popular on Internet mailing lists and websites.

The legend states that a temporary lick-and-stick tattoo soaked in LSD and made in the form of a blue star (the logo of the Dallas Cowboys is often mentioned), or of popular cartoon characters, such as Mickey Mouse and Bart Simpson, is being distributed to children in the area in order to get them "addicted to LSD" (see LSD § Addiction and dependence liability).

Generally some attribution is given, typically to a well-regarded hospital or a vaguely specified "advisor to the president", and instructions are given that parents should contact police if they come across the blue star tattoos.

== Origin ==
The legend possibly originated from the fact that an LSD solution is sometimes sold on blotter paper with various designs, including cartoons.

No actual cases of LSD distribution to children in this manner have been documented. Although LSD does not penetrate through skin in sufficient quantities so as to induce a psychedelic experience, the concern was over children licking the tattoo paper before transferring to the skin.

== Other countries ==
The legend has surfaced in many other places, including:

- Brazil
- Hungary
- Italy
- Peru
- Mexico
- Portugal
- Sweden
- UK
- Germany
- Canada

== See also ==
- Bananadine
- Urban legends about drugs
- Moral panic
- Poisoned candy myths
- Strawberry Quik meth myth
