= Akira Ogata =

Japanese chemist (1887–1978)

Akira Ogata (緒方 章, Ogata Akira; October 26, 1887 – August 22, 1978) was a Japanese chemist and the first to synthesize methamphetamine in crystalline form in 1919.

== Career ==
In 1912, Ogata graduated from the Faculty of Medicine of the University of Tokyo. In 1919 he received a degree from the Humboldt University of Berlin, where he had performed pharmacological experiments.

In 1920, he was appointed assistant professor at the Faculty of Medicine of the university of Tokyo, where he taught until 1948.

== History ==
In 1893, methamphetamine was first synthesised from ephedrine by Nagayoshi Nagai and in 1919, Akira Ogata was the first to synthesise methamphetamine in a crystallized form. Ogata blended the red phosphorus and ephedrine, which is derived from an Asian herbal plant, to produce an amphetamine that could be dissolved in water. The procedure involved reduction of ephedrine using iodine and red phosphorus. Ogata's synthesis of methamphetamine replaced much more complicated earlier syntheses, and continues to be used as the basis for modern production and usage of the drug. Particularly, it is the method favored in illegal drug production. Amphetamine was synthesized in 1887 by Lazar Edeleanu in Germany.

Ogata released this new drug to a British-based pharmaceutical company. It was then introduced as a pill form to treat diseases such as sinus congestion, asthma, and depression. The drug took on a new form in 1934 by the German pharmaceutical company Temmler. A tablet was named "Pervitin". This was marketed in Germany where it was known as Herman-Göring Pill. It became popular among soldiers, Luftwaffe pilots, and even Adolf Hitler. The new pill could keep tired pilots more alert and lift the spirits of those in battle.

In Japan the drug was used as a workforce pill. It was called "Philopon" which means "love of work" (phil- + opus). It was given to aircraft pilots, military personnel, and civilian military workers on night shifts to increase productivity.

Many pharmaceutical companies in the US patented the methamphetamines under various names, one of which was called Obetrol. They treated extreme obesity as a way to curb the appetite. However, these pills were outlawed in the 1970s due to some of the deleterious side effects.
