= Strawberry Quik meth =

Internet hoax

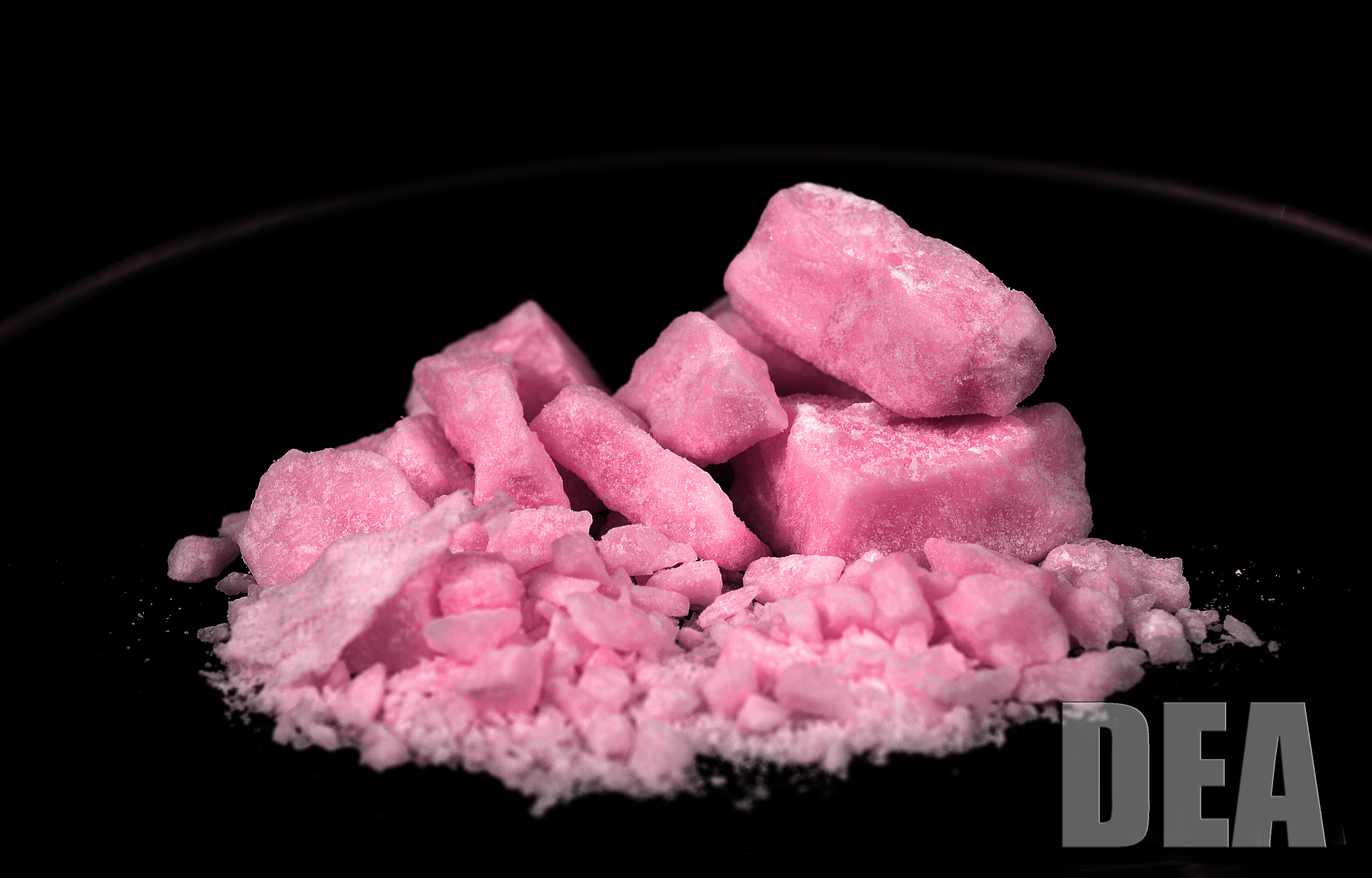
Methamphetamine dyed with pink food coloring

Strawberry Quik meth was a hoax drug scare which primarily took place in 2007. Drug dealers were allegedly using coloring and flavoring to disguise methamphetamine as Strawberry Quik, thus making it more appealing to children. No cases of children using flavored meth have been verified.

== Drug scare ==
Emails reported that drug dealers were using pop rocks to disguise the taste of meth and market it to children.

Emails began to circulate, claiming that meth was being disguised as candy and given to unsuspecting children. Snopes has reported that while colored crystal meth exists, and flavored meth may exist, there is no evidence of it being given to children. Drug dealers seek clients with a regular source of income, which precludes many children.

Strawberry Quik meth has also been widely reported in Southern Africa, but it has not yet been verified or proven. Newspapers often state that the drug is being handed to children through school fences in candy wrappers or packets.

== Existence of colored or flavored meth ==
Sometimes meth labs will try to brand their crystal meth product by coloring it in order to make it seem unique and to give it more market appeal. Police and drug enforcement officials have conjectured that the idea for "strawberry meth" may have come from such a process.

Law enforcement and treatment providers in Nevada and California have reported the distribution and/or use of flavored methamphetamine.

Strawberry-flavored meth was seized in an apartment in Carson City, Nevada in January 2007.

It is also possible for poorly synthesized batches of methamphetamine to have a pink or very light reddish color. This is most likely caused by the colored dyes present in over the counter drugs used in the production of meth, such as cold medicine containing ephedrine. This coloration would most likely be the result of improper or poorly executed synthesis of meth. While coloration is rare, it is often marketed as having more desirable qualities such as greater potency or less incidence of negative side effects, though there is no consistent evidence to back up such claims. This kind of tactic (marketing unique looking drugs as being better in some respect) is very common among dealers and drug users. The presence of added flavoring and of added color are independent. Crystal methamphetamine-based preparations may be colorless but flavored, may contain coloring but no flavoring, and may be both colored and flavored.

== See also ==
- List of misconceptions about illegal drugs
- Blue star tattoo legend
- Moral panic
- Urban legend
