= List of reagent testing color charts =

It is advised to check the references for photos of reaction results. Reagent testers might show the colour of the desired substance while not showing a different colour for a more dangerous additive. For this reason it is essential to use multiple different tests to show all adulterants.

== Folin's—Mandelin ==
Substance	Type	A Folin's B	Froehde	Liebermann	Mandelin
2C-B	Substance	?	Yellow	Yellow > Black	No reaction
2C-E	Substance	?	?	?	?
2C-I	Substance	?	?	?	No reaction
2C-T-2	Substance	?	?	?	?
2C-T-7	Substance	?	Violet and orange streaks	?	Maroon to Black
4-MEC	Substance	?	?	?	?
Acetaminophen	Adulterant	?	No reaction	?	Moderate olive
Alcohol	Substance	?	?	?	?
Alkaloids	Forms	?	?	?	?
Amines, and amino acids	Forms	?	?	?	?
Amphetamine	Substance	?	Red	?	Moderate bluish green
Asbestos (talc)	Adulterant	?	?	?	?
Aspirin	Adulterant	?	Grayish purple	?	Grayish olive green
Barbiturates	Class	?	?	?	?
Benzocaine	Adulterant	?	?	?	?
Benzodiazepines	Class	?	?	?	?
Benzphetamine	Substance	?	?	?	Brilliant yellow green
Boric acid	Adulterant	?	?	?	?
Brodifacoum (pesticide)	Adulterant	?	?	?	?
Caffeine	Substance	?	No reaction	?	No reaction
CBD	Substance	?	?	?	?
Chloral hydrate	Substance	?	?	?	?
Chloroquine	Adulterant	?	?	?	?
Chlorpromazine	Substance	?	Very deep red	?	Dark olive
Cocaine	Substance	No reaction	No reaction	Yellow	Deep orange yellow
Codeine	Substance	?	Dark Green > Red/Brown	?	Dark olive
Creatine	Adulterant	?	?	?	?
Diacetylmorphine (Heroin)	Substance	?	Purple/red > to green	?	Moderate reddish brown
Diltiazem	Adulterant	?	?	?	?
Dimethoxy-meth	Substance	?	?	?	Dark olive brown
Dimethylterephthalate	Adulterant	?	?	?	?
DMT	Substance	?	?	?	?
DOM	Substance	?	?	?	?
Doxepin	Substance	?	Deep reddish brown	?	Very reddish brown
Dristan	Substance	?	Light bluish green	?	Greyish olive
DXM	Substance	?	No reaction	?	White w/ green edges
Fentanyl	Substance	?	?	?	?
Formaldehyde	Adulterant	?	?	?	?
GHB	Substance	?	?	?	?
Hydrochlorides	Forms	?	?	?	?
Hydroxyzine	Adulterant	?	?	?	?
Indoles	Forms	?	?	?	?
Isopropylbenzylamine	Adulterant	?	?	?	?
Ketamine	Substance	?	No reaction	?	Orange/brown
Levamisole	Adulterant	?	?	Dark brown -> Very dark brown	?
Lidocaine	Adulterant	?	?	?	?
LSD	Substance	?	Moderate yellow green	?	?
Mace	Substance	?	Light olive yellow	?	Moderate olive green
Mannitol	Adulterant	?	?	?	?
MDA	Substance	?	Greenish black	?	Bluish black
MDEA	Substance	?	?	?	Dark purple
MDMA	Substance	?	Black w/ hints of greenish brown	?	Bluish black
Mephedrone	Substance	?	No reaction	?	No reaction
Mescaline	Substance	?	Green > to Blue or Yellow	?	Dark yellowish brown
Methadone	Substance	?	?	?	Dark greyish blue
Methamphetamine	Substance	?	No reaction	?	Dark yellowish green
Methaqualone	Substance	?	?	?	Very orange yellow
Methoxetamine	Substance	?	Yellow to green	?	No reaction
Methylone	Substance	?	Deep green	?	Yellow
Methylphenidate	Substance	?	No reaction	?	Brilliant orange yellow
Methylsulfonylmethane	Adulterant	?	?	?	?
MXE	Substance	?	?	?	?
Nutmeg	Adulterant	?	?	?	?
Opiates	Class	?	?	?	?
Synthetic opioids (gray death)	Class	?	?	?	?
PCP	Substance	?	?	?	?
Phenacetin	Adulterant	?	?	?	?
Phytocannabinoids	Class	?	?	?	?
PMA	Substance	?	n	?	Green to brown
Primary amines	Forms	?	?	?	?
Procaine	Adulterant	?	?	?	Deep orange
Psilocybin	Substance	?	?	?	?
Quinine	Adulterant	?	?	?	Deep greenish yellow
Reducing sugars (sugar)	Adulterant	No reaction	White > light brown	White w/ light purple edges	White > brown
Secondary amines	Forms	?	?	?	?
Sodium bicarbonate	Adulterant	?	?	?	?
Strychnine	Adulterant	?	?	?	?
Sulfates	Forms	?	?	?	?
Synthetic cannabinoids	Class	?	?	?	?
THC	Substance	?	?	?	?
Tocopheryl acetate	Adulterant	?	?	?	?
Tramadol	Substance	?	?	?	?

== Marquis—Simon's ==
Substance	Type	Marquis	Mecke	A Morris B	A Simon's B
2C-B	Substance	Yellow to green	Yellow/brown	?	No reaction
2C-E	Substance	?	?	?	?
2C-I	Substance	Yellow to green	Dark brown	?	No reaction
2C-T-2	Substance	?	?	?	?
2C-T-7	Substance	Apricot	Red to purple	?	No reaction
4-MEC	Substance	No reaction	Light green	?	?
Acetaminophen	Adulterant	?	?	?	?
Alcohol	Substance	?	?	?	?
Alkaloids	Forms	?	?	?	?
Amines, and amino acids	Forms	?	?	?	?
Amphetamine	Substance	Strong reddish orange/Dark reddish brown	No reaction	?	No reaction
Asbestos (talc)	Adulterant	?	?	?	?
Aspirin	Adulterant	Deep red	?	?	?
Barbiturates	Class	?	?	?	?
Benzocaine	Adulterant	?	?	?	?
Benzodiazepines	Class	?	?	?	?
Benzphetamine	Substance	Deep reddish brown	?	?	?
Boric acid	Adulterant	?	?	?	?
Brodifacoum (pesticide)	Adulterant	?	?	?	?
Caffeine	Substance	No reaction	No reaction	?	No reaction
CBD	Substance	?	?	?	?
Chloral hydrate	Substance	?	?	?	?
Chloroquine	Adulterant	?	?	?	?
Chlorpromazine	Substance	Deep purplish red	Blackish red	?	?
Cocaine	Substance	No reaction	?	No reaction or light pink	?
Codeine	Substance	Deep purplish red	Very dark bluish green	?	?
Creatine	Adulterant	?	?	?	?
Diacetylmorphine (Heroin)	Substance	Deep purplish red	Deep bluish green	?	?
Diltiazem	Adulterant	?	?	?	?
Dimethoxy-meth	Substance	Moderate olive	Dark brown	?	?
Dimethylterephthalate	Adulterant	?	?	?	?
DMT	Substance	?	?	?	?
DOM	Substance	?	?	?	?
Doxepin	Substance	Blackish red	Very dark red	?	?
Dristan	Substance	Dark grayish red	Light olive brown	?	?
DXM	Substance	Grey with smoke	Yellow	?	No reaction
Fentanyl	Substance	?	?	?	?
Formaldehyde	Adulterant	?	?	?	?
GHB	Substance	?	?	?	?
Hydrochlorides	Forms	?	?	?	?
Hydroxyzine	Adulterant	?	?	?	?
Indoles	Forms	?	?	?	?
Isopropylbenzylamine	Adulterant	?	?	?	?
Ketamine	Substance	No reaction	No reaction	?	No reaction
Levamisole	Adulterant	?	?	?	?
Lidocaine	Adulterant	?	?	?	?
LSD	Substance	Olive black	Greenish black	?	?
Mace	Substance	Moderate yellow	Dark grayish olive	?	No reaction
Mannitol	Adulterant	?	?	?	?
MDA	Substance	Dark purple to black	Very dark blue	?	No reaction
MDEA	Substance	Dark purple	Dark purple	?	Blue
MDMA	Substance	Dark purple to black	Dark purple	?	Blue
Mephedrone	Substance	No reaction	No reaction	?	No reaction
Mescaline	Substance	Strong orange	Moderate olive	?	?
Methadone	Substance	Light yellowish pink	?	?	?
Methamphetamine	Substance	Deep reddish orange/Dark reddish brown	No reaction	?	Blue
Methaqualone	Substance	No reaction	No reaction	?	No reaction
Methoxetamine	Substance	Pink (slow)	Yellow > green > red	?	Slow pink > red
Methylone	Substance	Brown	Orange/brown	?	Blue
Methylphenidate	Substance	Moderate orange yellow	?	?	Pale violet
Methylsulfonylmethane	Adulterant	?	?	?	?
MXE	Substance	?	?	?	?
Nutmeg	Adulterant	?	Brownish Black	?	?
Opiates	Class	?	White > green > turquoise	?	?
Synthetic opioids (gray death)	Class	?	?	?	?
PCP	Substance	?	?	?	?
Phenacetin	Adulterant	?	?	?	?
Phytocannabinoids	Class	?	?	?	?
PMA	Substance	No reaction	No reaction	?	No reaction
Primary amines	Forms	?	?	?	?
Procaine	Adulterant	?	?	?	?
Psilocybin	Substance	?	?	?	?
Quinine	Adulterant	?	?	?	?
Reducing sugars (sugar)	Adulterant	White > light yellow > black	White > light yellow > black	?	No reaction
Secondary amines	Forms	?	?	?	?
Sodium bicarbonate	Adulterant	?	?	?	?
Strychnine	Adulterant	?	?	?	?
Sulfates	Forms	?	?	?	?
Synthetic cannabinoids	Class	?	?	?	?
THC	Substance	?	?	?	?
Tocopheryl acetate	Adulterant	?	?	?	?
Tramadol	Substance	?	?	?	?

== Custom reagents ==
Substance	Type	Reagent test	Color
Alcohols	Forms	Lucas test in alcohols is a test to differentiate between primary, secondary, and tertiary alcohols.	
Alkaloids	Forms	Froehde; Liebermann; Mandelin; Marquis; Mayer's; Mecke; Simon's	
Amines, and amino acids	Forms	Folin's	
Barbiturates	Class	Dille–Koppanyi; Zwikker	
Benzodiazepines	Class	Zimmermann	
Phytocannabinoids	Class	Duquenois–Levine reagent	
Cocaine	Substance	Scott	Reddish-brown > vibrant blue
Hydrochlorides	Forms	Silver nitrate	
Indoles	Forms	DMACA reagent Ehrlich	
Primary amines	Forms	Robadope	
Reducing sugars (sugar)	Adulterant	Benedict's; Fehling's	
Secondary amines	Forms	Simon's	
Sulfates	Forms	Barium chloride	
Synthetic cannabinoids	Class	Proprietary	

== See also ==
- Counterfeit medications
- Drug checking
- Harm reduction
