= Gallic acid reagent =

The Gallic acid reagent is used as a simple spot-test to presumptively identify drug precursor chemicals. It is composed of a mixture of gallic acid and concentrated sulfuric acid.

0.05 g of gallic acid is used for every 10 mls of sulfuric acid. The same ratio of gallic acid n-propyl ester in sulfuric acid can also be used.

Because of its short shelf life (changing to pale violet color) it is sometimes prepared by dissolving gallic acid into ethanol and adding the sulfuric acid at the time of testing from a separate bottle. In this case 100 mL ethanol is used and one drop of sulfuric acid is used per drop of gallic acid in ethanol.

Colours of the gallic acid reagent with various substances after 30 seconds
Substance	Color
Methylone	Yellow
MDPV	Yellow
Mephedrone	No reaction
Methcathinone	No reaction
Cathinone	No reaction
3-FMC	No reaction

== See also ==
- Drug checking
- Liebermann–Burchard test
- Dille–Koppanyi reagent
- Folin's reagent
- Froehde reagent
- Mandelin reagent
- Marquis reagent
- Mecke reagent
- Simon's reagent
- Zwikker reagent
- Liebermann reagent
