= Chen-Kao reaction =

Chelate complex of the Chen-Kao reaction starting from (1S,2S)-pseudoephedrine

The Chen-Kao reaction (named after Ko Kuei Chen and Chung-Hsi Kao, Madison, Wisconsin 1926) is a chemical method for determining the presence of pseudoephedrine, ephedrine, and similar phenylalkylamines. The reaction is used in spot tests and is also known as Chen-Kao test (or simply as Chen, Test T in UN Precursor Test Kit). The test is often used to distinguish ephedrine, pseudoephedrine, norephedrine, cathinone and methcathinone from amphetamine and methamphetamine, which do not react with Chen’s test reagent.

== Testing Method ==
The Chen-Kao test is performed by creating an acidic solution of the compound to be tested and adding dilute Copper (II) Sulfate and Sodium hydroxide solutions.
The procedure is as follows:

1. Place small amount of material to be tested on a spot plate.
2. Add 2 drops of reagent A
3. Add 2 drops of reagent B
4. Add 2 drops of reagent C
5. A violet color indicates presence of ephedrine or pseudoephedrine
- Reagent A - 1% (vol/vol) aqueous acetic acid solution
- Reagent B - dissolve 1g Copper(II) sulfate in 100ml water
- Reagent C - dissolve 8g of NaOH in 100ml of water (that is 2N NaOH solution)

Further, the coordination complex might be extracted with organic solvent like diethyl Ether or n-butanol (see Table II), as proposed in the literature, which provides additional confirmation of the original results, but no further differentiation. This modification is not included in the UN Precursor Test Kit and other spot tests alike. In order to further differentiate between ephedrine enantiomers - ephedrine, pseudoephedrine and other ephedrine-related compounds, Simon’s test (with acetaldehyde) and Simon’s test (with acetone) are used. (see Table III)

== Reaction mechanism ==
When acidic solution of ephedrine or pseudoephedrine is mixed with copper sulfate and sodium hydroxide solutions, a violet color is formed. Upon shaking with ether, the organic phase turns red/purple and the aqueous phase turns blue. The staining is based on the formation of a coordination complex of two ephedrine molecules and a copper ion Cu^{2+}

This works, because, in an alkaline solution, the hydroxyl and amine groups are de-protonated, leaving a negative charge on the central atoms. They can then form a coordination complex with the positively-charged cupric ions from the copper sulfate. Phenethylamines (and their derivatives) that have a β-ketone group will also react, but less predictably and dramatically (the carbonyl oxygen is less nucleophilic than the deprotonated hydroxyl group). They usually form a deeper blue color, and often a grey-ish precipitate. This includes the cathinones and presumably βK-2C-x compounds.

Chen-Kao reaction of 2-amino-1-phenylpropan-1-ol (Cathine) without consideration of the stereochemistry.

== Description ==
The execution of the Chen-Kao reaction is simple, needs little practice and limited skills. Also, the violet color obtained in the reaction is easy to define. For a correct execution, the typical colors develop relatively slowly, and that a good color intensity requires a sample of a few milligrams of the substances tested (i.e., more than what would typically be required for most other tests included in the UN test kits).

Of all ephedrine-related compounds, only ephedrine and pseudoephedrine produce the typical, stable violet color. Other ephedrine-related compounds produce a blue to greenish-blue precipitate. This precipitate could be seen as characteristic for the members of the ephedrine group other than pseudoephedrine and ephedrine itself, hence, the Chen-Kao test appears to show a significant specificity within the ephedrine group. However, it is known from previously published cross-testing work that various pharmaceuticals not related to the ephedrine group may produce similar blue copper complexes.

The two keto-amines, cathinone and methcathinone, initially also produce blue-colored complexes with the Chen-Kao reagent. However, a slow transition of the initial color into yellow, followed by an orange-brown color can be observed with both compounds, thus indicating the instability of the complexes initially formed, and an obvious decomposition of the two compounds under the alkaline conditions of this color reaction.

The results of the solvent extractions, summarized in Table II appear to add little novelty to the results of the original Chen-Kao reactions. However, in cases of doubts, they may serve as confirmatory steps.

== Results ==
Table I - Results of the Chen-Kao test
Compound tested	Color
Ephedrine	Violet
Pseudoephedrine	Violet
Norephedrine	Bright blue precipitate
Norpseudoephedrine	Blue precipitate
Chloropseudoephedrine	Bright blue (light greenish) precipitate
N-Methylephedrine	Pale blue precipitate (the crystals in the precipitate are violet)
Cathinone	Pale blue precipitate, turns to violet, through grey (greenish) in 2–3 minutes it turns to orange(brownish)
Methcathinone	Bright blue precipitate, through green it turns to brown, after 10 minutes the precipitate and the solution are orange

Table II - Results of solvent extractions of the complex formed in the Chen-Kao reaction
Compound tested	Chen-Kao	D-Ether	D-Ether - Water layer	N-Butanol	N-Butanol - Water layer
Ephedrine	Violet	Purple	Blue	Purple	Transparent
Pseudoephedrine	Violet	Purple	Blue	Purple	Blue
Norephedrine	Blue	Transparent	Pale blue, precipitate	Blue-Violet	Opaque
Norpseudoephedrine	Blue	Precipitate forming a ring between layers	Blue	Blue-Violet	Transparent

Table III - Results of the Simon and Chen-Kao reactions used for the distinction of ephedrine-related compounds
Compound tested	Chen-Kao	Simon test I(with acetaldehyde)	Simon test II(with acetone)
Ephedrine	Violet	Light blue (in 5 min. deeper)	No color
Pseudoephedrine	Violet	No color	No color
Norephedrine	Bright blue precipitate	Olive green(brownish)	Light Pink
Norpseudoephedrine	Blue precipitate	No color	Light Pink
Chloropseudoephedrine	Bright blue (light greenish) precipitate	Bright blue, after 5 min it turns to grey (brownish sediment)	No color
N-Methylephedrine	Pale blue precipitate	Light Pink	Light Orange

== See also ==
- Drug test
- Drug checking
- Drug testing reagents
- Marquis reagent
- Scott test
- Froehde reagent
- Duquenois–Levine reagent
- Ehrlich's reagent
- Gold(III) bromide
- Dille–Koppanyi reagent
- Liebermann reagent
- Mandelin reagent
- Mecke reagent
- Simon's reagent
- Zwikker reagent
