= Zimmermann reagent =

The Zimmermann reagent is used as a simple spot-test used in chromatography to presumptively identify alkaloids, especially benzodiazepines, as well as other compounds. It is therefore used in drugs testing.

It is a two-component reagent, with the first component composed of 1,3-dinitrobenzene (1% w/v) in methanol and the second component composed of 15% potassium hydroxide in water.

One drop of each component is added to the sample being tested and the resulting colour change is observed to give an indication of the identity of the compound.

The reagent works by forming a reddish-purple Meisenheimer complex at C3 for diazepines with a carbonyl at C2 and an alkyl group at N1. Without these groups it is not possible to form the methylene compound which reacts with dinitrobenzene but triazolo compounds may react.

It is named for the American biochemist Robert Zimmermann (b.1937).

Final colors produced by Zimmermann Reagent with various substances
Substance	Color
Diazepam	Reddish purple

== See also ==
- Drug checking
- Dille–Koppanyi reagent
- Folin's reagent
- Liebermann reagent
- Mandelin reagent
- Marquis reagent
- Mecke reagent
- Simon's reagent
- Zwikker reagent
- Froehde reagent
