= Mandelin reagent =

Chemical test for alkaloids and other compounds

The Mandelin reagent is used as a simple spot-test to presumptively identify alkaloids as well as other compounds. It is composed of a mixture of ammonium metavanadate and concentrated sulfuric acid. Its primary use is for the detection of ketamine and PMA Unlike the most common reagent test chemicals, it has a deep red colour that changes to yellow if there is no alkaloid, which occurs within about 48 hours of mixing.

The United States Department of Justice method for producing the reagent is the addition of 100 mL of concentrated (95–98%) sulfuric acid to 0.5-1 g of ammonium metavanadate.

This reagent was invented by the German pharmacologist, Karl Friedrich Mandelin (1854–1906) at the Imperial University of Dorpat.

Final colors produced by Mandelin reagent with various substances
Substance	Color
2C-T-7	Wine dark to Black
Acetaminophen	Moderate olive
Benzphetamine	Brilliant yellow green
Chlorpromazine	Dark olive
Cocaine	Deep orange yellow
Codeine	Dark olive
d-Amphetamine	Moderate bluish green
d-Methamphetamine	Dark yellowish green
Diacetylmorphine (Heroin)	Moderate reddish brown
Dimethoxymethamphetamine	Dark olive brown
Doxepin	Very reddish brown
Dristan	Greyish olive
Exedrine	Dark olive
Ketamine	Deep reddish orange
Mace	Moderate olive green
MDA	Bluish black
MDMA	Bluish black
Mescaline	Dark yellowish brown
Methadone	Dark greyish blue
Methaqualone	Very orange yellow
Methylphenidate	Brilliant orange yellow
Morphine	Dark greyish reddish brown
Opium	Olive black
Oxycodone	Dark greenish yellow
Procaine	Deep orange
Propoxyphene	Dark reddish brown
Psilocybin	Green
Paramethoxyamphetamine (PMA)	Reddish brown
Paramethoxymethamphetamine (PMMA)	Reddish brown
Salt (NaCl-HCl)	Strong orange

== See also ==
- Drug checking
- Dille–Koppanyi reagent
- Folin's reagent
- Froehde reagent
- Liebermann reagent
- Marquis reagent
- Mecke reagent
- Simon's reagent
- Zwikker reagent
