= Trans-European Drug Information =

Nonprofit-run database for drug checking

Trans-European Drug Information network
- Abbreviation: TEDI
- Founded: 20 June 2008; 18 years ago
- Purpose: Drug checking
- Region served: Europe
- Website: https://www.tedinetwork.org/

The Trans-European Drug Information (TEDI) project is a European database compiling information from different drug checking services located on the European continent. The non-governmental organizations feeding into the database are referred to as the TEDI network.

== History ==
The first drug checking service in Europe opened in 1986 in Amsterdam, allowing drug users to analyze the chemical composition of illicit substances that they consume. In the following years, a number of nonprofit organizations present in various other drug scenes in several countries (including in Austria, France, Germany, the Netherlands, Portugal, Spain, and Switzerland) set up drug checking services.

In 2011, a database was created for to centralize information from these services and allow for the sharing of alerts (for example on new adulterants in illicit substances or circulation of novel psychoactive substance) and the monitoring of drug markets across borders.

Between 2008 and 2013, organizations member of the TEDI network analyzed more than 45,000 samples of recreational drugs, showing similarities and discrepancies between areas of the European continent in terms of purity, formulation, or prices.

== The TEDI project ==
The project and the network are hosted by the Polish nonprofit TEDI Nightlife Empowerment & Well-being Network (also known as NEW net or SaferNightlife).

=== Network ===
As of 2022, the TEDI network was integrated by 20 organizations across 13 countries (Austria, Belgium, Finland, France, Germany, Italy, Luxembourg, the Netherlands, Portugal, Slovenia, Spain, Switzerland, and the United Kingdom). A team of professionals from various fields (substance use disorder prevention workers, pharmacists, chemists, etc.) across network member organizations constitutes the TEDI project's team.

=== Database ===
The aims of the Trans-European Drug Information project are to collect, monitor and analyze the evolution of the European recreational drug market trends, and to regularly report the findings. Since 2011, the database has facilitated the centralization and comparison of information collected at the local level.

The TEDI database also feeds into the early warning system of the European Union Drugs Agency (EUDA, formerly EMCDDA). EUDA and the TEDI network also collaborate on the organization of conferences and trainings.

In 2019, the mobile application TripApp was launched by a consortium or organizations, sharing in real-time alerts from the TEDI database, in addition to connecting app users with local harm reduction providers. The app received an award from the Council of Europe in 2021.

=== Guidelines ===
As part of the project, guidelines and methodological recommendations have been published, such as:

- Factsheets on drug checking services,
- Guidance for organizations willing to create a drug checking service,
- Training on personal support and counselling in nightlife settings, etc.

== See also ==
- Drug checking
- Harm reduction
- Substance use disorder
- Drug policy
- European Monitoring Centre for Drugs and Drug Addiction
- Early warning system
- Reagent testing
