= European Union Drugs Agency =

Agency on illicit drugs of the European Union, formerly "EMCDDA"

European Union Drugs Agency (EUDA)
- Current logo

Agency overview
- Formed: 1993
- Jurisdiction: European Union
- Headquarters: Lisbon, Portugal; 38°42′21″N 9°08′35″W
- Employees: 115 (July 2024)
- Annual budget: €15.2 million (proposed; 2014)
- Agency executives: Lorraine Nolan, Executive Director; Laura D'Arrigo, Chairman
- Website: www.euda.europa.eu

The European Union Drugs Agency (EUDA), known until 2024 as the European Monitoring Centre for Drugs and Drug Addiction (EMCDDA), is an agency of the European Union headquartered in Lisbon, Portugal, and established in 1993. Lorraine Nolan has served as its executive director since 1 January 2026.

In June 2022, the Council of the European Union approved a reform of the organization which led to an extension of its mandate.

The EUDA strives to be the "reference point" on drug usage for the European Union's member states, and to deliver "factual, objective, reliable and comparable information" about drug usage, drug addiction and related health complications, including hepatitis, HIV/AIDS and tuberculosis. Though the EUDA primarily serves Europe, it also works with other partners, scientists and policy-makers around the world.

== Mission and role ==
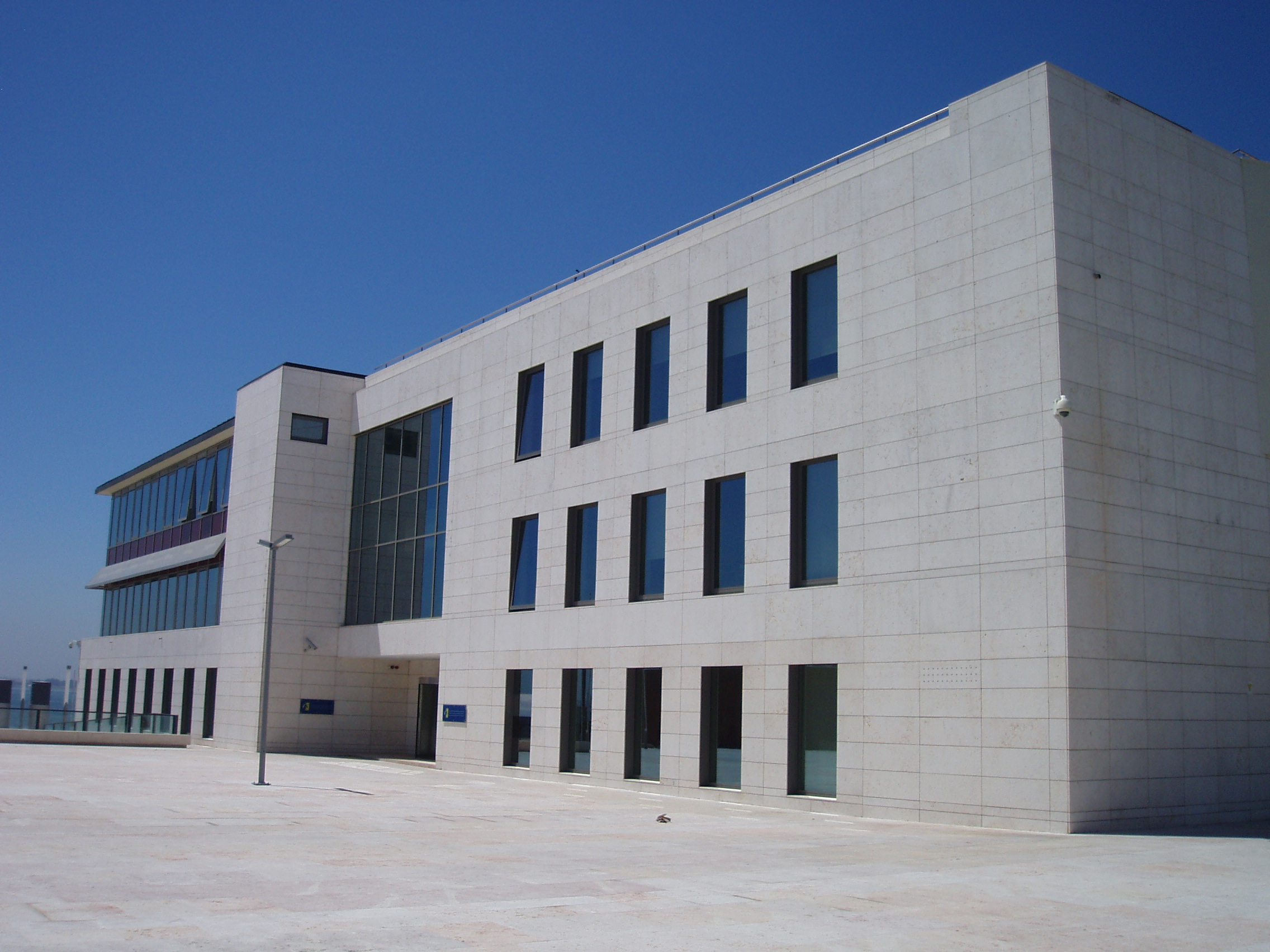
One of the two EUDA agency buildings in Lisbon

The Agency was founded on the principle that independent scientific research is a "vital resource to help Europe understand the nature of its drug problems and better respond to them."

Its stated missions are to:

- Provide the Community and EU Member States with: 'factual, objective, reliable and comparable information at European level concerning drugs and drug addiction and their consequences'
- Collect, register and analyse information on 'emerging trends', particularly in polydrug use, and the combined use of licit and illicit psychoactive substances
- Offer information on best practice in the EU Member States and facilitate exchange of such practice between them

Among the Centre's target groups are policy-makers, who use this information to help formulate coherent national and EU drug strategies. Also served are professionals and researchers working in the drugs field and, more broadly, the European media and general public.

At the heart of the Centre's work is the task of improving the comparability of drug information across Europe and devising the methods and tools required to achieve this. As a result of efforts to date, countries can now view how they fit into the wider European picture and examine common problems and goals. A key feature of the drug phenomenon is its shifting, dynamic nature, and tracking new developments is a central task of the Agency.

The new mandate as of July 2024 includes new mechanisms such as a European Drug Alert System, European Threat Assessment System and a European Network of Forensic and Toxicological Laboratories. This way the agency should better anticipate future drug-related challenges and their consequences, alerts on new drug risks and threats to health and security, strengthen the responses to the drug phenomenon and facilitate knowledge exchange for evidence-based drug policies.

== Network, reports and partnerships ==
The Centre obtains information primarily from the "Reitox network": a group of focal points in each of the 28 EU Member States, Norway, the candidate countries to the EU, and at the European Commission. This human and computer network links the national information systems of the 28 Member States, Norway, and their key partners to the Agency. It acts as a practical instrument for the collection and exchange of data and information.

The annual report on the state of the drugs problem in the European Union and Norway and an online statistical bulletin offer a yearly overview of the latest European drug situation and trends. Meanwhile, online country situation summaries provide a pool of national drug-related data.

The Agency works in partnership with non-EU countries as well as with international bodies such as the United Nations International Drug Control Programme, the World Health Organization, the Council of Europe's Pompidou Group, the World Customs Organization, the International Criminal Police Organization (Interpol) and the European Police Office.

There are also partnerships with non-governmental organizations such as with the Trans-European Drug Information (TEDI) in relation with drug checking services.

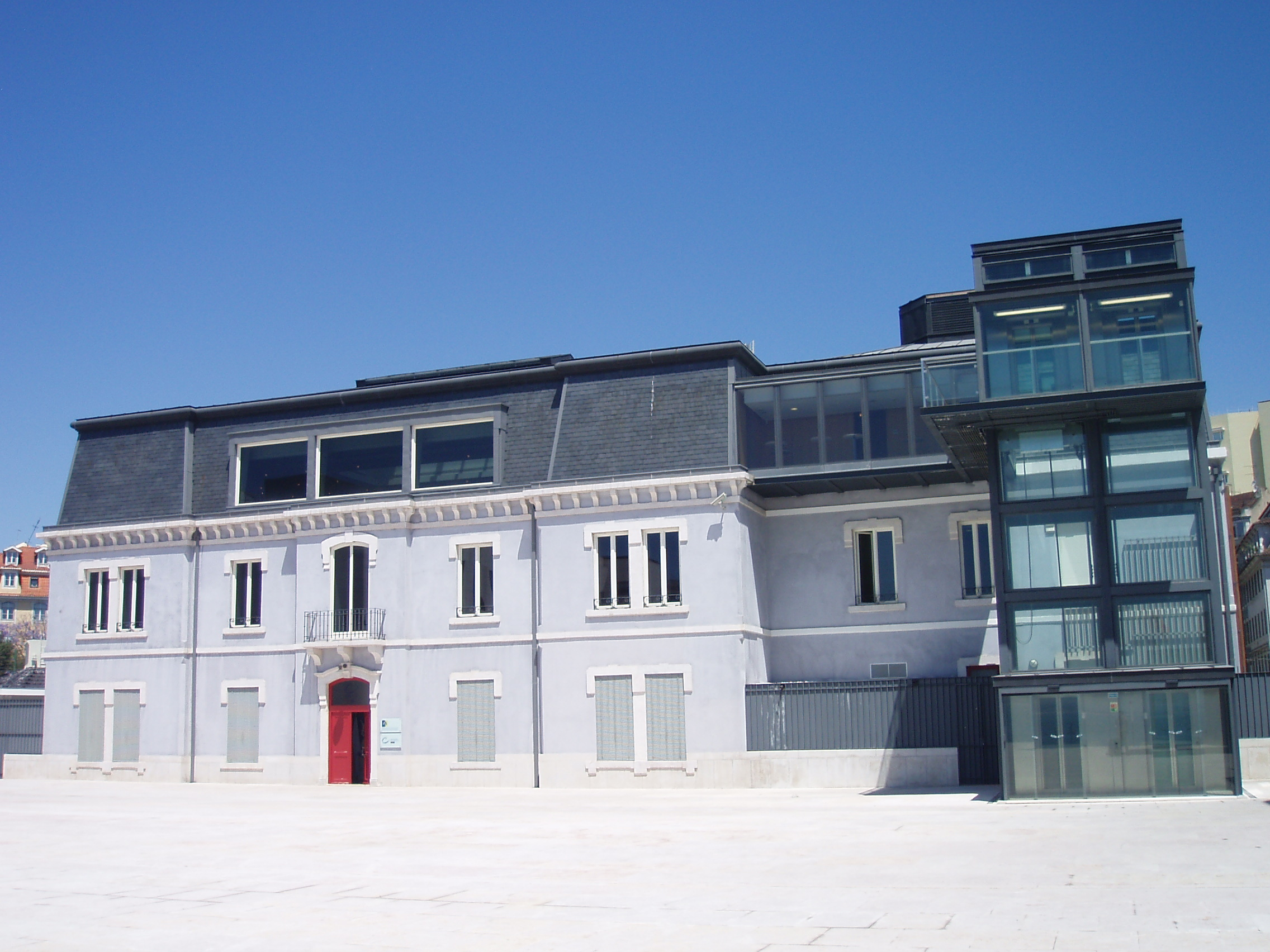
Palacete do Relógio – one of the two agency buildings in Lisbon

== Critical Evaluation ==
Limits to the effectiveness of the organisation have been identified as possible disparity in research standards and rigour between member countries. Efforts to standardise research and data collection are an essential element to maintaining consistency and validity in universal application throughout the European Union. Benefit may be gained also from more detailed and timely monitoring of emerging drug trends in fulfilling the organisation's role of providing pre-emptive responses to drug related issues. An additional challenge to the Agency is ensuring limited resources are effectively managed so as not to provide replication of research and risk becoming redundant.

The Agency is proactive in suggesting positive policy change, based on their data collection, to the organisations that can implement these changes. One such change was presented in their 2015 annual report titled 'Alternatives to punishment for drug-using offenders'. Razmadze and colleagues in their review of the Agency's report supported the contention that incarcerating drug users is placing a large financial burden on states as well as doing more harm to drug users and their families. The evidence shows that this option criminalises offenders and promotes recidivism whereas treatment and rehabilitation programs provide the better option to keep both the drug user and the public safer. This alternative approach towards drug users is in keeping with the guidelines by the United Nations 1988 and the Council of the European Union in 2012.

== Acknowledgements ==
In 2013, The American Library Association recognised three Agency’s publications among the notable government documents of 2012.

== See also ==
- European Union
- European Council decisions on designer drugs
- United Nations Office on Drugs and Crime (UNODC)
- Trans-European Drug Information (TEDI)
