= Testing kit =

Testing kit or test kit is a discerning device used in a wide range of areas including:

- Medical diagnosis
- Reagent testing
- Rape kit
- Pregnancy test
- Gunshot residue
- Soil test
