= Excedrin (brand) =

Over-the-counter headache pain reliever

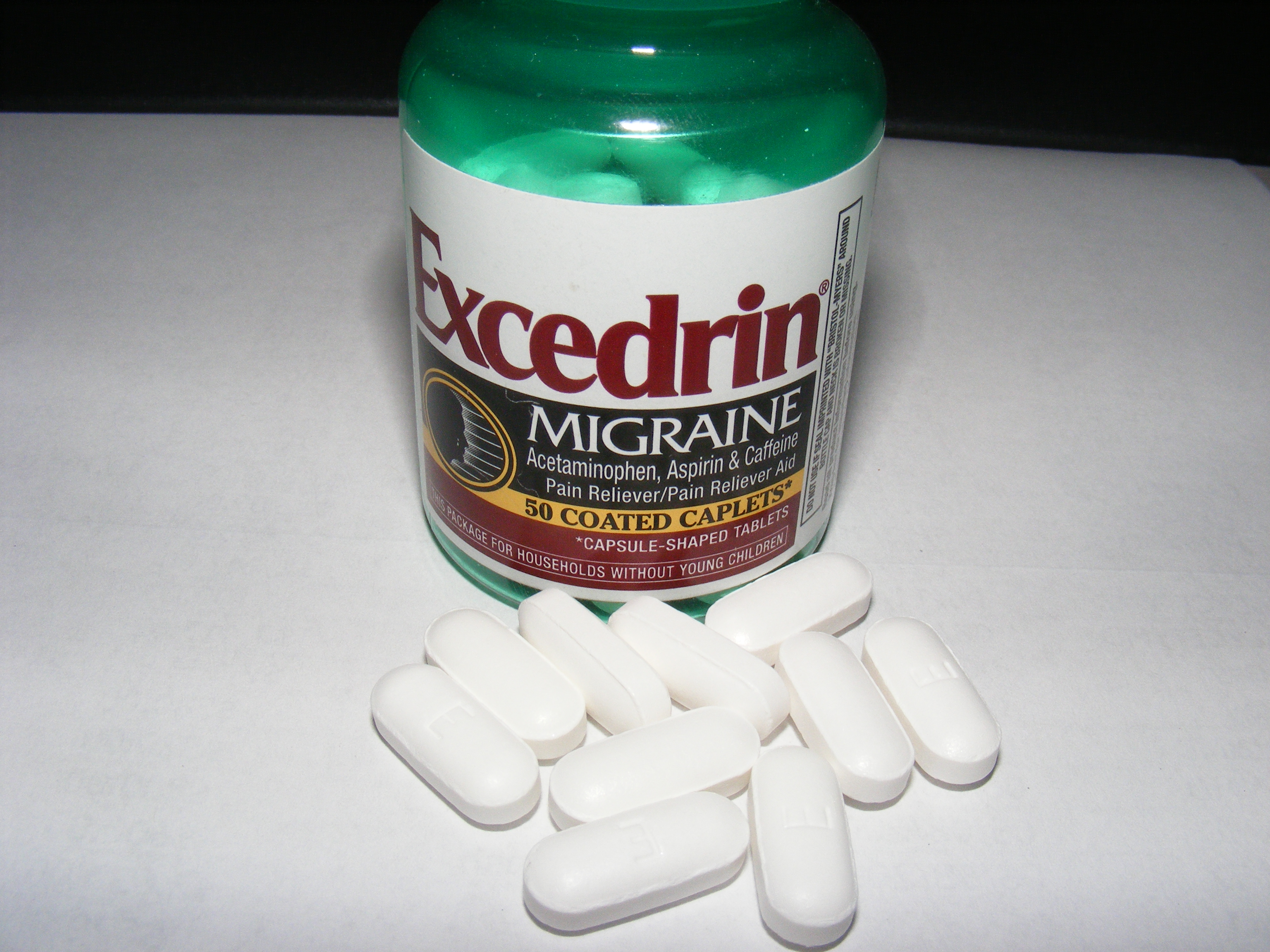
A bottle of Excedrin with some of the caplets

Excedrin is an over-the-counter headache pain reliever, typically in the form of tablets or caplets. It contains acetaminophen, aspirin and caffeine. It was manufactured by Bristol-Myers Squibb until it was purchased by Novartis in July 2005 along with other products from BMS's over-the-counter business. As of March 2015, GSK holds majority ownership of Excedrin through a joint venture transaction with Novartis. On July 18, 2022, GSK spun off its consumer healthcare business (including Excedrin) to Haleon.

The brand became known for advertisements where it cured especially unpleasant and excruciating headaches (called "Excedrin headaches" in the ads of 1970s, and later called "Excedrin tension headaches"). In 2007, the brand branched out into marketing for other types of pains with the introduction of Excedrin Back & Body, without caffeine.

== Principles of work ==
Excedrin is a combination medication composed of acetaminophen, aspirin, and caffeine. These medications treat migraine headache in a variety of ways.

Acetaminophen is a fever reducer and painkiller. Its precise mechanism is unknown. It is known that it mostly affects the brain and spinal cord, which are parts of the central nervous system. By lowering the quantity of prostaglandins the body produces, acetaminophen raises the threshold for pain.

Aspirin is a nonsteroidal anti-inflammatory drug (NSAID). It lessens irritation and swelling as well as discomfort and inflammation. The amount of prostaglandins the body produces is also decreased by aspirin, but not in the same way that acetaminophen does.

Caffeine acts as a vasoconstrictor, causing blood vessels to become smaller. This helps to restrict the blood vessels in the brain. As a result, the amount of blood that may pass through the blood arteries at once is reduced. There are several theories regarding the cause and exacerbation of headaches, and it is thought by some that vasodilation may contribute to symptoms. If a headache is brought on by caffeine withdrawal, the caffeine content of Excedrin may relieve it.

== Versions ==
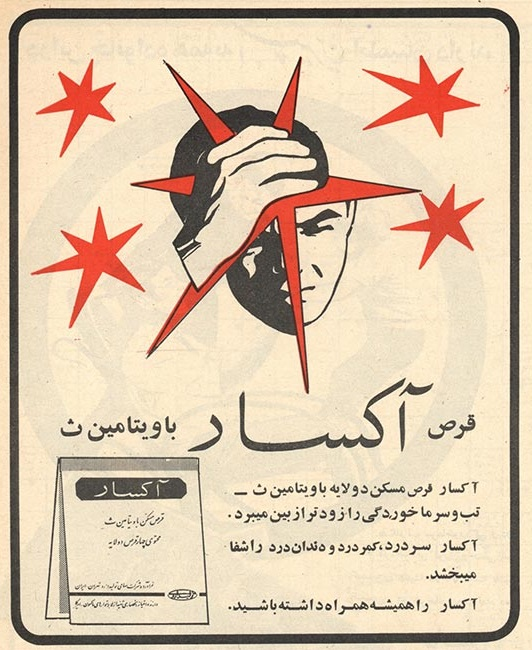
An Excedrin magazine ad in Persian, Zan-e Rooz weekly, 16 January, 1971

Over the years, different forms of the drug have been introduced:

- 1960: Excedrin Extra Strength (the formula changed for the last time in 1978) In 1960, Bristol-Myers, nowadays Bristol-Myers Squibb, introduced Excedrin Extra Strength for headaches, the first multi-ingredient headache treatment product. Contains 250 mg acetaminophen, 250 mg aspirin and 65 mg caffeine.
- 1969: Excedrin PM – Excedrin PM is the first headache and sleeping pill combination product. Contains 500 mg acetaminophen and 38 mg diphenhydramine citrate as a sleep aid. Those same active ingredients were later utilized several years later in the product Tylenol PM.
- 1998: Excedrin Migraine – At the beginning of 1998, the FDA granted clearance to market Excedrin Migraine for the relief of migraine headache pain and associated symptoms. Excedrin Migraine continued the trend of marketing pain products for specific types of pain, becoming the first migraine headache medication available to consumers without a prescription, even though it has identical active ingredients to the regular Excedrin Extra Strength product, 250 mg acetaminophen, 250 mg aspirin, and 65 mg caffeine. In fact, upon the product's launch, its advertising slogan was “Excedrin is now Excedrin Migraine,” noting that the two were the same product.
- 2003: Excedrin Tension Headache contains 500 mg acetaminophen, and 65 mg caffeine.
- 2005: Excedrin Sinus Headache contains 325 mg acetaminophen and 5 mg phenylephrine HCl as a decongestant.
- 2007: Excedrin Back and Body – a dual-ingredient formula claiming that it "works two ways—as a pain reliever and a pain blocker right where it hurts". Contains 250 mg acetaminophen, 250 mg aspirin.
- Discontinued – Excedrin Menstrual Complete, which continued the trend of marketing pain products for specific types of pain, even though it had identical active ingredients to the regular Excedrin Extra Strength product and Excedrin Migraine: 250 mg acetaminophen, 250 mg aspirin and 65 mg caffeine.

== Canada ==
Excedrin is no longer sold in Canada.

Previously, Excedrin Migraine and Excedrin Extra Strength sold in Canada had a different formulation compared to the United States. In Canada the product sold with those names contained 500 mg of acetaminophen and 65 mg of caffeine per tablet. The reason was that the combination of acetaminophen with aspirin creates the risk of renal papillary necrosis if large doses are taken chronically.

== Ownership ==
In 2005, Bristol-Myers Squibb announced the sale of its North American consumer medicine business (including Excedrin, Comtrex and Keri brands) to Novartis for $660 million, in order to focus on drugs for the ten most profitable disease areas. As of March 2015, GlaxoSmithKline held majority ownership through a joint venture transaction with Novartis.

== Recall and production stoppage ==
=== 2012 recall ===
On January 9, 2012, Novartis announced that it was voluntarily recalling all lots of select bottle-packaging configurations of Excedrin products with expiration dates of December 20, 2014, or earlier as a precautionary measure because the products may contain stray tablets, capsules, or caplets from other Novartis products, or contain broken or chipped tablets. The recall was conducted with the knowledge of the U.S. Food and Drug Administration. Wholesalers and retailers were instructed to stop distribution and return the affected product. Consumers in possession of recalled Excedrin were instructed to stop using the product and contact Novartis. Novartis stated that Excedrin would be shipping to stores on October 15, 2012, and that customers would start seeing it by the first of November.

=== January 2020 production stoppage ===
On January 21, 2020, GlaxoSmithKline announced that production and distribution of caplets and gel tabs of Excedrin Extra Strength and Excedrin Migraine would be stopped temporarily. Their statement said, "Through routine quality control and assurance measures, we discovered inconsistencies in how we transfer and weigh ingredients" for the recalled products, and that production would restart "shortly". However, GSK acknowledged that they "cannot confirm a definite date as to when supply will resume".

=== December 2020 recall ===
On December 26, 2020, the U.S. Consumer Product Safety Commission announced the recall of 400,000 bottles of Excedrin due to the containers of the drug allegedly having holes in the bottom. The concern behind the recall was that the plastic bottles, if they had a hole, could allow children to access the painkiller caplets and lead to dangerous overdose or poisoning. The recall involved bottles containing 50, 80, 100, 152, 200, 250, or 300 caplets.

== See also ==
- Stella Nickell, who tampered with Excedrin tablets
