= Cornelis Zwikker =

Dutch physicist (1900–1985)

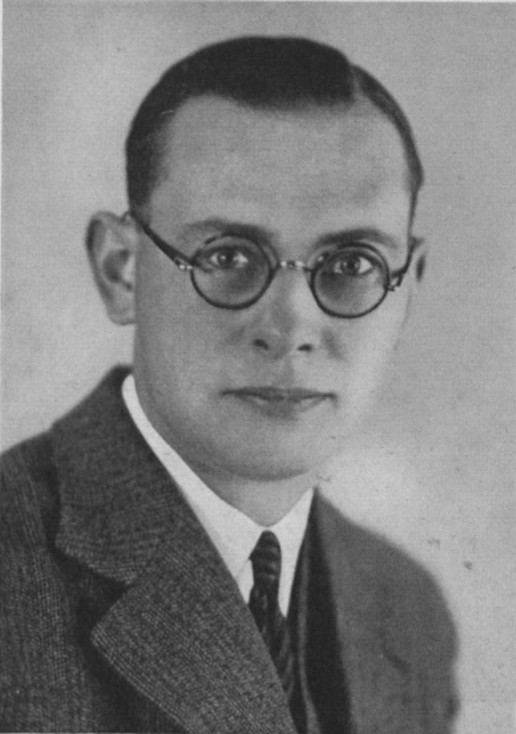
- Prof. Dr. Cornelis Zwikker, 1938
- Born: 19 August 1900; Zaandam, Netherlands
- Died: 20 April 1985 (aged 84); Zwijndrecht, Netherlands
- Education: University of Amsterdam
- Occupation: scientist
- Spouse: Johanna Dorothea Theinert (m. 1924; died 1984)

Cornelis Zwikker (19 August 1900 – 20 April 1985) was a Dutch scientist.

== Biography ==
Zwikker was born in Zaandam as the son of Klaartje Dil and the shopkeeper Klaas Cornelisz Zwikker. He married Johanna Dorothea Theinert (*1901, Zaandam) in 1924 in Zaandam. In 1918 he had started studying chemistry and later physics at the University of Amsterdam, where in 1925 he obtained his PhD with the thesis "Physical properties of wolfram at high temperatures" under supervision of the Noble-laureate Pieter Zeeman.

From 1923 he worked as scientific researcher at Philips in Eindhoven, but in 1929 he was appointed professor in theoretical and applied physics at the Delft University of Technology. He was involved in the acoustic design of sound studios and presided over multiple physics-related organizations. In 1945 he requested retirement from his professoriate in Delft and became technical director of the "light" section at Philips. Director of the National Aeronautical Research Institute (NLL) from 1 November 1952 to 1 November 1956. In addition he advised for many years NLL and NLR as member of the Scientific Committee, from 1968 till 1972 as chairman. Between 1956 and 1970 he again was professor of physics, now at the Eindhoven University of Technology. He lived in Eindhoven until the death of his wife in March 1984 and died in Zwijndrecht in 1985.

== Work ==
Zwikker's contributions are mostly in physics and chemistry. In chemistry, he introduced the Zwikker test. In physics, he is known for his contributions to acoustics.

Zwikker is the author of the classic geometry textbook, The Advanced Geometry of Plane Curves and Their Applications, designed to teach the applications of complex numbers to the study of curves and to the resolution of problems in geometry and engineering.

== Books ==
Zwikker wrote many books; the best known are the following:

- Sound Absorbing Materials (1949, with C. W. Kosten, Elsevier Publishing Co.)
- The Advanced Geometry of Plane Curves and Their Applications (1963, Dover Publications); originally published as Advanced Plane Geometry (1950, North-Holland Publishing Co.)
