= Sullivan reaction =

Chemical reaction

The Sullivan reaction is a chemical test used for detecting the presence of cysteine or cystine in proteins. A red colour appears when a protein with cysteine or cystine is heated with sodium 1,2-naphthoquinone-4-sulfonate (Folin's reagent) and sodium dithionite under alkaline conditions. This was pioneered by the American organic and industrial chemist Eugene Cornelius Sullivan (1872–1962).
