= Ehrlich's reagent =

Reagent used in microbiology

p-DMAB: the active ingredient in Ehrlich's reagent

Ehrlich's reagent or Ehrlich reagent is a reagent containing p-dimethylaminobenzaldehyde (DMAB) and thus can act as an indicator to presumptively identify indoles and urobilinogen. Several Ehrlich tests use the reagent in a medical test; some are drug tests and others contribute to diagnosis of various diseases or adverse drug reactions. It is named after Nobel Prize winner Paul Ehrlich who used it to distinguish typhoid from simple diarrhoea.

The Ehrlich reagent works by binding to the C2 position of two indole moieties to form a resonance stabilised carbenium ion compound.

== Medical testing ==
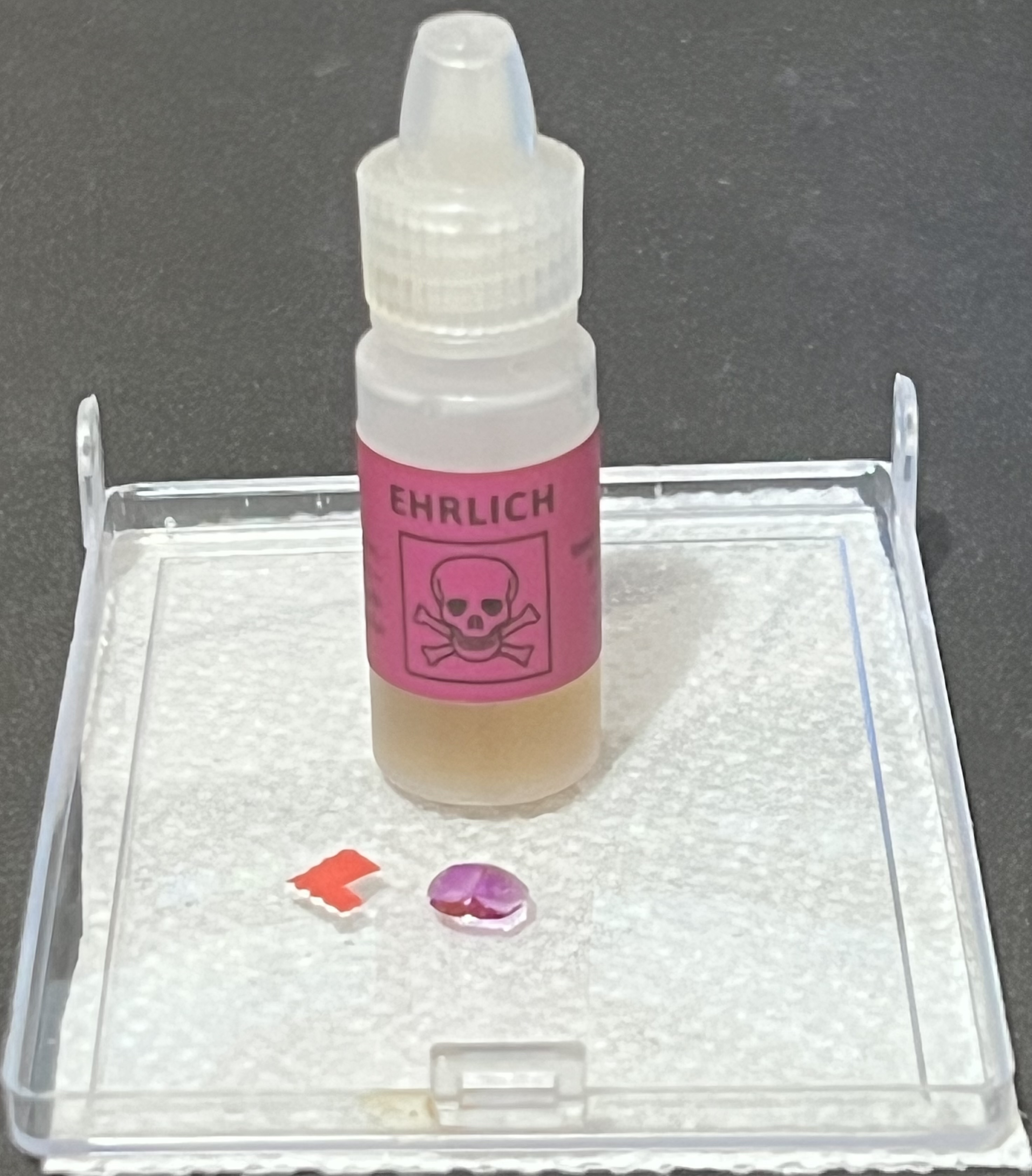
Ehrlich's reagent can be used to test for the presence of LSD. Upon reaction, the Ehrlich's reagent turns to purple indicating the presence of LSD.

Ehrlich reagent can be used to detect urobilinogen, which can indicate jaundice or other liver-related issues.

A very common Ehrlich test is a simple spot test to identify possible psychoactive compounds such as tryptamines (e.g. DMT) and lysergamides (e.g. LSD). It gives a negative test-result for 25I-NBOMe and many other non-indole-related psychoactives. The reagent will also give a positive result for opium, because of the presence of tryptophan in natural opium.

Pyridoxine, present in vitamin supplements, can give positive results to the Ehrlich test, showing a pink colour change.

== Preparation ==
The reagent is prepared by dissolving 0.5–2.0 g of p–dimethylaminobenzaldehyde (DMAB) in 50 mL of 95% ethanol and 50 mL of concentrated hydrochloric acid and is best used when fresh. Other alcohols, such as 1-propanol, can also be used as well.

The Ehrlich reagent is similar to a number of other indole tests:

- The van Urk reagent, which uses 0.125 g of p-DMAB, 0.2 mL of ferric chloride solution (25 mg/mL) in 100 mL of 65% (equivalent to 50 mL sulfuric acid in 50 mL water) sulfuric acid. This is sometimes referred to as the Hofmann reagent or p-DMAB-TS (Test Solution) and gives slightly different colours with different indoles.
- The Renz and Loew reagent, which uses p-dimethylaminocinnamaldehyde and may also be used for the detection of flavonoids.
- The "improved hallucinogen reagent", which uses a 1:1 solution of 5% DMAB in concentrated phosphoric acid (specific gravity 1.45) to methanol.

== See also ==
- Drug checking
- Other alkaloid spot tests:
  - Froehde reagent
  - Indole test
  - Kovács reagent, similar but uses isoamyl alcohol
  - Liebermann reagent
  - Marquis reagent
