= Froehde reagent =

Test to presumptively identify alkaloids and other compounds

The Froehde reagent is used as a simple spot-test to presumptively identify alkaloids, especially opioids, as well as other compounds. It is composed of a mixture of molybdic acid or a molybdate salt dissolved in hot, concentrated sulfuric acid, which is then dripped onto the substance being tested.

The United States Department of Justice method for producing the reagent is the addition of 100 ml of hot, concentrated (95–98%) sulfuric acid to 0.5 g of sodium molybdate or molybdic acid.

The Virginia Department of Forensic Science method uses 0.5 g ammonium molybdate per 100 ml H_{2}SO_{4} (conc.)

Unheated sulfuric acid can be used to prepare the reagent in a less dangerous manner, but 2–4 hours must be allowed for the molybdate to dissolve.

Final colors produced by Froehde Reagent with various substances
Substance	Color
Amphetamine	No reaction or Red
Cathinone	No reaction
Methcathinone	No reaction
4-MMC	No reaction
3-FMC	No reaction
MDMA	Black
Methylone	Bright yellow
MDPV	Bright yellow
Butylone	Yellow > Green
3,4-DMMC	Light brown
Naphyrone	Orange
PMA	Pale green
PMMA	Pale green
4-MeO-PCP	Light yellow
Methoxetamine	Yellow - Green
3-HO-PCE	Black
5-MeO-DALT	Yellow
4-AcO-DALT	Yellow > Green
4-HO-MET	Yellow > Green
4-HO-MIPT	Yellow > Green
4-AcO-DET	Yellow > Green
aMT	Yellow
5-IT	Red brown
5-APB	Dark purple
6-APB	Purple
Camfetamine	Tan > Dark yellow
Methiopropamine	Light brown
MDAI	Green > Black
5-IAI	Orange
Allylescaline	Green > Black (fast)
2C-T-2	Orange > Purple
2C-B	Yellow
2C-P	Green
b-methoxy-2C-D	Red
Acetaminophen	Pale blue
Aspirin	Greyish purple or Blue > Purple
Alimemazine	Purple red
Chlorphentermine	Green
Chlorpromazine HCl	Very deep red
Contac HCl	Moderate olive brown
Dimethoxy-meth HCl	Very yellow green
Diphenhydramine	Orange
Doxepin HCl	Deep reddish brown
Dristan	Light bluish green
Ephedrine	Brown
Exedrine	Brilliant blue
Flurazepam	Orange
LSD	Moderate yellow green, Yellow Green
Mace	Light olive yellow
MDA HCl	Greenish black
Mescaline	Green or brown or light yellow
Meperidine	Grey
Modafinil	Deep orange/red
Morphine monohydrate	Deep purplish Red > Slate
Heroin HCl	Deep purplish red > Green
Opium	Brownish black
Oxycodone HCl	Strong yellow - Blue or Green
Codeine HCl	Very dark Green > Red - Brown
Hydromorphone	Blue > Purple
Hydrocodone	Light Yellow
Pentazocine	Blue
Pethidine	Yellow
Phenoxymethylpenicillin	Blue
Phenyltoloxamine	Green
Promazine	Orange
Promethazine	Purple red
Propoxyphene HCl	Dark greyish red or Brown
Propylhexadrine	Purple red
Sugar	Brilliant yellow
Salicylic acid	Purple red
Tetracycline	Purple red
Thioridazine	Purple red
Guaifenesin	Green with purple streaks
Methapyrilene	Purple
Pyrilamine	Purple
Trifluoperazine	Orange
Triflupromazine	Orange

== See also ==
- Reagent testing
- Drug checking
- Dille–Koppanyi reagent
- Folin's reagent
- Liebermann reagent
- Mandelin reagent
- Marquis reagent
- Mecke reagent
- Simon's reagent
- Zwikker reagent
