= Fencamfamin =

Chemical compound

Clinical data
- Trade names: Reactivan, Glucoenergan (E. Merck);, Norcamphane, Euvitol (Allen & Hanburys), Euvital, Reactimerk, Altimina, Entigue, Sicoclor
- Pregnancy category: ?
- Routes of administration: Oral
- ATC code: N06BA06 (WHO)

Legal status
- Legal status: BR: Class B1 (Psychoactive drugs); CA: Schedule IV; DE: Anlage II (Authorized trade only, not prescriptible); US: Schedule IV

Pharmacokinetic data
- Elimination half-life: 16 hours

Identifiers
- IUPAC name: N-Ethyl-3-phenyl-norbornan-2-amine
- CAS Number: 1209-98-9
- PubChem CID: 14584
- DrugBank: DB01463
- ChemSpider: 13922
- UNII: NME1I5IGBK
- KEGG: D07343
- ChEMBL: ChEMBL7010
- CompTox Dashboard (EPA): DTXSID60862601

Chemical and physical data
- Formula: C_{15}H_{21}N
- Molar mass: 215.340 g·mol^{−1}
- 3D model (JSmol): Interactive image
- SMILES: CCNC1C(C2CCC1C2)C3=CC=CC=C3
- InChI: InChI=1S/C15H21N/c1-2-16-15-13-9-8-12(10-13)14(15)11-6-4-3-5-7-11/h3-7,12-16H,2,8-10H2,1H3; Key:IKFBPFGUINLYQI-UHFFFAOYSA-N

Fencamfamin (INN), also known as fencamfamine or by the brand names Glucoenergan and Reactivan, is a stimulant which was developed by Merck in the 1960s.

== Medical uses ==
Fencamfamin is still used, though rarely, for treating depressive day-time fatigue, lack of concentration and lethargy, particularly in individuals who have chronic medical conditions, as its favourable safety profile makes it the most suitable drug in some cases.

== Adverse effects ==
Fencamfamin is well tolerated and causes minimal circulatory effects. Extended use may result in a dryness of the mouth.

=== Contraindications ===
Not to be used with heart diseases, angina pectoris and decompensated cardiac insufficiency, glaucoma, hyper-excitability and thyrotoxicosis or while treated with monoamine oxidase inhibitors.

=== Overdose ===
Symptoms of overdose are nausea, agitation and restlessness, dryness of the mouth, dizziness and tremor. In gross overdosage also associated with dyspnoea, tachycardia, disorientation and convulsions.

== Research ==
In a study on slices of rat corpus striatum and substantia nigra fencamfamin acted as an indirect dopamine agonist. It released dopamine by a similar mechanism to amphetamines, but was ten times less potent than dexamphetamine at producing this effect. The main mechanism of action was instead inhibition of dopamine reuptake. Also unlike amphetamines, fencamfamin does not inhibit the action of monoamine oxidase enzymes. It was concluded that, at least in the models employed, the in vitro profile of fencamfamin is more similar to that of nomifensine, a reportedly pure uptake inhibitor, than to d-amphetamine.

In animal experiments on place preference fencamfamin produced a significant place preference only at the dose of 3.5 mg/kg. The experiments suggested a relation to dopamine D1 receptors, and also to opioid receptors in the reinforcement produced by fencamfamin, as place preference was blocked by the selective dopamine D1 antagonist SCH 23390 and by the opioid antagonist naloxone. A similar place preference, which was blocked by naloxone and by SCH 23390 and by raclopride, has been seen in a study on rats with drinking water. Animals treated with naloxone before the conditioning sessions showed a place aversion instead of the place preference found in saline-treated animals. Naloxone also reduced drinking. It was proposed that naloxone induced a state of frustrative nonreward. It was suggested that both dopamine and (endogenous) opioids are important for water-induced reinforcement. Possible interactions between these two neurotransmitter systems were discussed.

== Synthesis ==
Preparation of fencamfamin precursor

Fencamfamin may be synthesized in a straightforward fashion via the Diels-Alder reaction between cyclopentadiene and β-nitrostyrene (1-nitro-2-phenyl-ethene). The C=C double bond and the nitro-group in the resulting norcamphene derivative are then reduced to give the saturated norcamphane derivative. Finally, the amino-group is ethylated.

Although β-nitrostyrene is commercially available, it is also very easily prepared using the Henry Reaction between benzaldehyde and nitromethane.

The Diels-Alder reaction of β-nitrostyrene and cyclopentadiene is described in a number of early papers.

The reduction of the nitroalkene may be carried out sequentially. The alkene's double bond is typically reduced using hydrogen and a transition metal catalyst like Ni or Pt, while the nitro group is reduced to the amine with a metal/acid combination, such as Fe/HCl. The reduction of both functional groups can also be achieved simultaneously by the use of Raney nickel, and this transformation has recently been optimized by Russian chemists.

Originally achieved under reductive amination conditions involving the reaction of the amine with acetaldehyde in the presence of Pt, ethylation of the amino-group has been improved by the use of Ra-Ni and ethanol.

The stereochemical consequences of the steps involved in the reaction sequence outlined above have been studied. Thus, the Diels-Alder cycloaddition leads to a product in which the nitro- and phenyl- groups are in a trans- relationship to each other. This product is actually a mixture of stereoisomers, in which the pair of enantiomers having the nitro- group in the endo- position and the phenyl- group in the exo- position predominates over the enantiomeric pair with exo-nitro and endo-phenyl groups. Although the isomeric composition of the Diels-Alder adduct itself does not seem to have been determined, Poos et al. reported a ratio of ~3:1 for the saturated un-ethylated amine derived from it. Novakov and co-workers, citing a thesis study, report that the corresponding ratio of endo-N-ethyl/exo-Φ : exo-N-ethyl/endo-Φ enantiomeric pairs is ~9:1 in fencamfamin itself.

== See also ==
- Camfetamine
