= Isopropylbenzylamine =

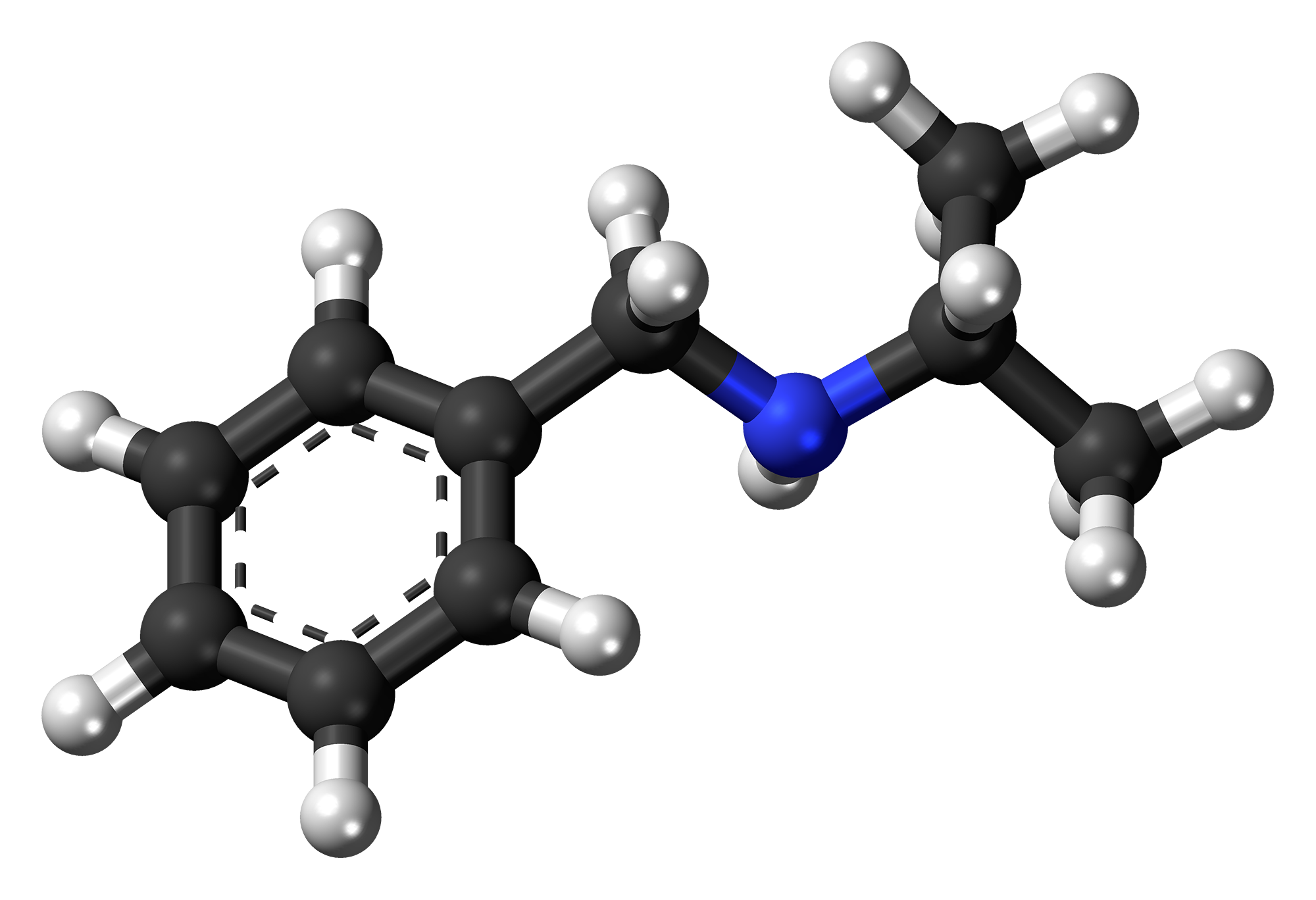

Names
- Preferred IUPAC name N-Benzylpropan-2-amine
- Other names N-(Phenylmethyl)propan-2-amine; Isopropylbenzylamine

Identifiers
CAS Number	102-97-6
3D model (JSmol)	Interactive image
ChemSpider	59415
ECHA InfoCard	100.002.789
PubChem CID	66024
UNII	67SYC92FNS
CompTox Dashboard (EPA)	DTXSID8059265
- InChI: InChI=1S/C10H15N/c1-9(2)11-8-10-6-4-3-5-7-10/h3-7,9,11H,8H2,1-2H3 Key: LYBKPDDZTNUNNM-UHFFFAOYSA-N; InChI=1/C10H15N/c1-9(2)11-8-10-6-4-3-5-7-10/h3-7,9,11H,8H2,1-2H3 Key: LYBKPDDZTNUNNM-UHFFFAOYSA-N
- SMILES: N(C(C)C)Cc1ccccc1

Properties
Chemical formula	C_{10}H_{15}N
Molar mass	149.237 g·mol^{−1}

Pharmacology
Legal status	BR: Class F2 (Prohibited psychotropics)
- Except where otherwise noted, data are given for materials in their standard state (at 25 °C [77 °F], 100 kPa). verify (what is ?) Infobox references

N-isopropylbenzylamine is a compound that has appeared in chemical literature often playing an intermediary role in applications of experimental synthesis and novel organic transformations. Despite having limited documented uses, it is most well known for having previously come to the attention of the DEA due to being used by illicit methamphetamine manufacturers as a diluent of or substitute for methamphetamine, with many recorded sightings occurring in the years 2007–2008. It not known to be a controlled substance in any other jurisdiction. Isopropylbenzylamine is not thought to have any stimulant effects in its own right, though anecdotal reports suggest that it may be associated with side effects such as headaches and confusion which are not typically associated with methamphetamine itself. The toxicity of N-isopropylbenzylamine has been studied as of 2022 and it has been found to produces toxicity via increasing nitric oxide in vitro. In this study, in vitro toxicity of N-isopropylbenzylamine and its toxicity-related targets were investigated in SN4741, SH-SY5Y or PC12 cell lines that model neurons. The study sounds an alarm for methamphetamine users and warns of the dangers of N-isopropylbenzylamine for public health.

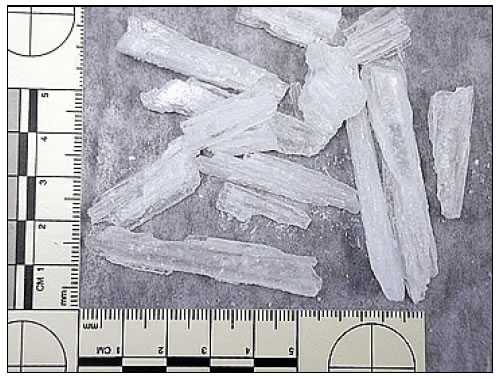
Isopropylbenzylamine hydrochloride crystals seized by DEA.
