= Marquis reagent =

Mixture for identifying alkaloids

Marquis reagent is used as a simple spot-test to presumptively identify alkaloids as well as other compounds. It is composed of a mixture of formaldehyde and concentrated sulfuric acid, which is dripped onto the substance being tested. The United States Department of Justice method for producing the reagent is the addition of 100 mL of concentrated (95–98%) sulfuric acid to 5 mL of 40% formaldehyde. Different compounds produce different color reactions. Methanol may be added to slow down the reaction process to allow better observation of the colour change.

== History ==
Marquis reagent was first discovered and tested in 1896 by pharmacologist Eduard Marquis (1871–1944), then a student of Rudolf Kobert at the University of Dorpat (in Tartu, Estonia). The reagent was described by Marquis in his Master of Pharmacy dissertation in 1896 and subsequently named after him.

The reagent should be stored in the freezer for maximum shelf life.

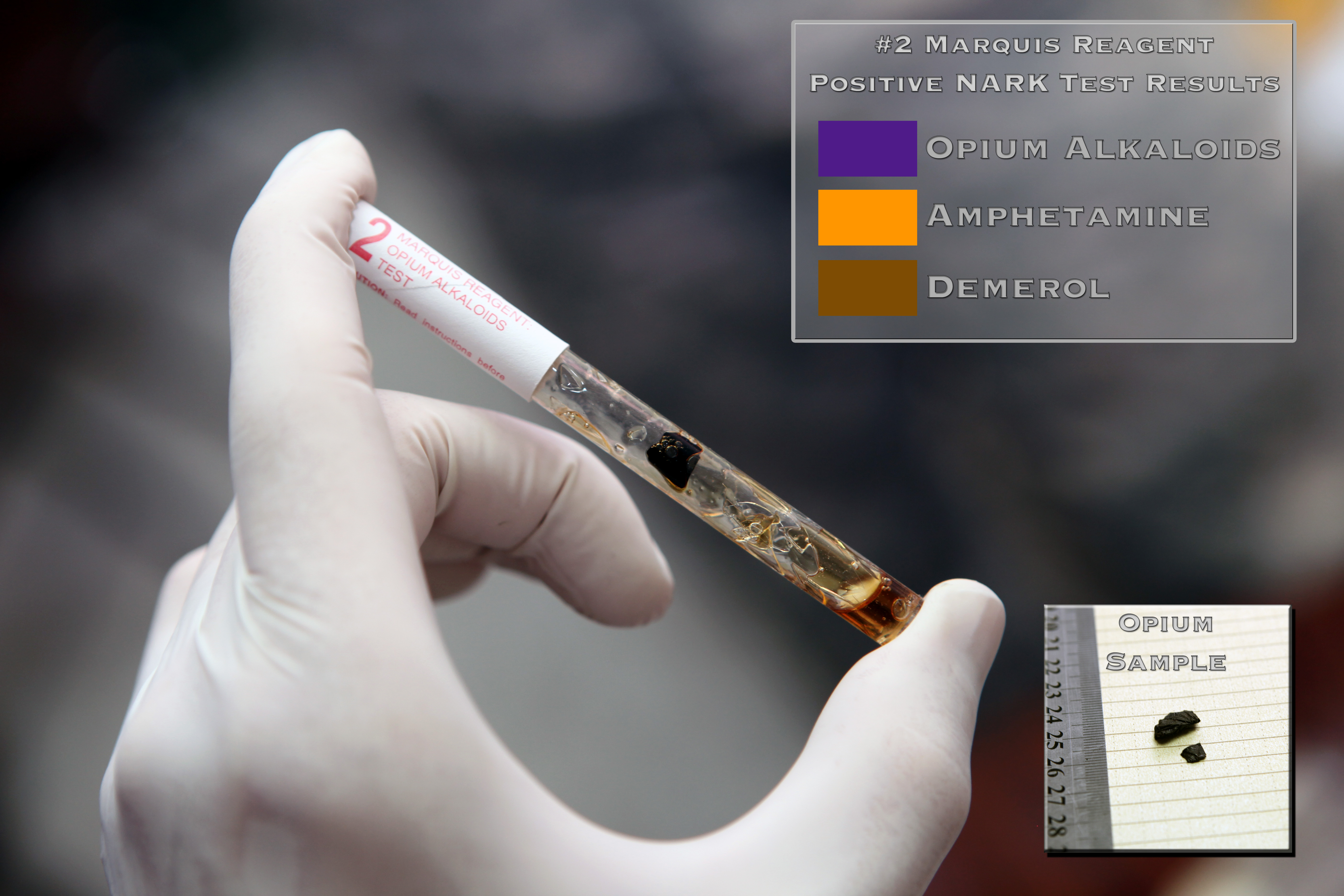
The above photo shows the positive results of the number 2 Marquis reagent presumptive drug test when used with a sample of opium.

It is the primary presumptive test used in Ecstasy reagent testing kits. It can also be used to test for such substances as opiates (e.g. codeine, heroin), and phenethylamines (e.g. 2C-B, mescaline).

The test is performed by scraping off a small amount of the substance and adding a drop of the reagent (which is initially clear and colorless). The results are analyzed by viewing the color of the resulting mixture, and by the time taken for the change in color to become apparent.

== Results ==
Reagent test results develop very quickly and due to reactions with moisture and oxygen in air, any changes after the first 60 seconds should be discarded.

Marquis reagent test analysis
Substance	Color	Time (s)	Notes
MDMA or MDA	purple to black	0–5	May have dark purple tint
Amphetamine, or methamphetamine	orange to brown	0–5	May have a brown tint
2C-B	yellow to green	5–10	Color may change from initial result
DXM	gray to black	15–30	Initially no change; takes much longer to reach black than MDMA

Final colors produced by Marquis Reagent with various substances
Substance	Color
βk-2C-B	Bright orange 30min
2C-B	Green-yellow 30min
2C-I	Green-yellow 30min
2,5-Dimethoxy-4-bromoamphetamine (DOB)	Olive green – yellow
2-FMA	Rapidly fizzes and dissolves. Colourless/light yellow
25I-NBOMe	Orange
25C-NBOMe	Clear, Transparent
25B-NBOMe	Dark green
4F-MPH	Transparent, no reaction
5-EAPB	Purple to black
5-MeO-MiPT	Clear/light brown
Aspirin	Pink > deep red
Adrafinil	Deep reddish orange – dark reddish brown
Benzphetamine	Deep reddish brown
Benzylpiperazine(BZP)	Clear (fizzes)
Buprenorphine	Pinkish violet
Butylone	Yellow
Chlorpromazine	Deep purplish red
Codeine	Very dark purple
Caffeine	Transparent, no change
Cocaine	Transparent, no change
d-Amphetamine	Strong reddish orange – dark reddish brown
d-Methamphetamine	Deep reddish orange – dark reddish brown
Diacetylmorphine (Heroin)	Deep purplish red
Dimethoxy-4-amylamphetamine (DMAA)	No color change (fizzes)
Dimethyltryptamine (DMT)	Orange
Diphenhydramine (DPH)	Yellow/orange > brown
Dimethoxymethamphetamine HCL (DMMA)	Moderate olive
Doxepin	Blackish red
Dristan	Dark grayish red
Exedrine	Dark red
LSD	Clear (no reaction), charring of paper may occur
Methoxetamine	Slow pink
3,4-Methylenedioxyamphetamine (MDA)	Dark purple – black
Methylenedioxy-N-ethylamphetamine (MDEA)	Dark purple – black
Methylenedioxymethamphetamine (MDMA)	Dark purple – black
Methylenedioxypropylamphetamine (MDPR)	Dark purple – black
Methylone (M1/bk-MDMA/MDMC)	Yellow
Methylenedioxypyrovalerone (MDPV)	Yellow
Pethidine/Meperidine	Deep brown
Mescaline	Strong orange
Methadone	Light yellowish pink
Methylphenidate	Moderate orange yellow
Methylene Blue	Dark green
Modafinil	Yellow/orange – brown
Morphine	Deep purplish red
Opium	Dark grayish reddish brown
Oxycodone	Pale violet
Propoxyphene	Blackish purple
Sugar	Dark brown

== Mechanism ==
The colour change from morphine is proposed to be a result of two molecules of morphine and two molecules of formaldehyde condensing to the dimeric product which is protonated to the oxocarbenium salt.

== See also ==
- Drug checking
- Drug test
- Dille–Koppanyi reagent
- Folin's reagent
- Froehde reagent
- Liebermann reagent
- Mandelin reagent
- Mecke reagent
- Simon's reagent
- Zwikker reagent
