= Folin's reagent =

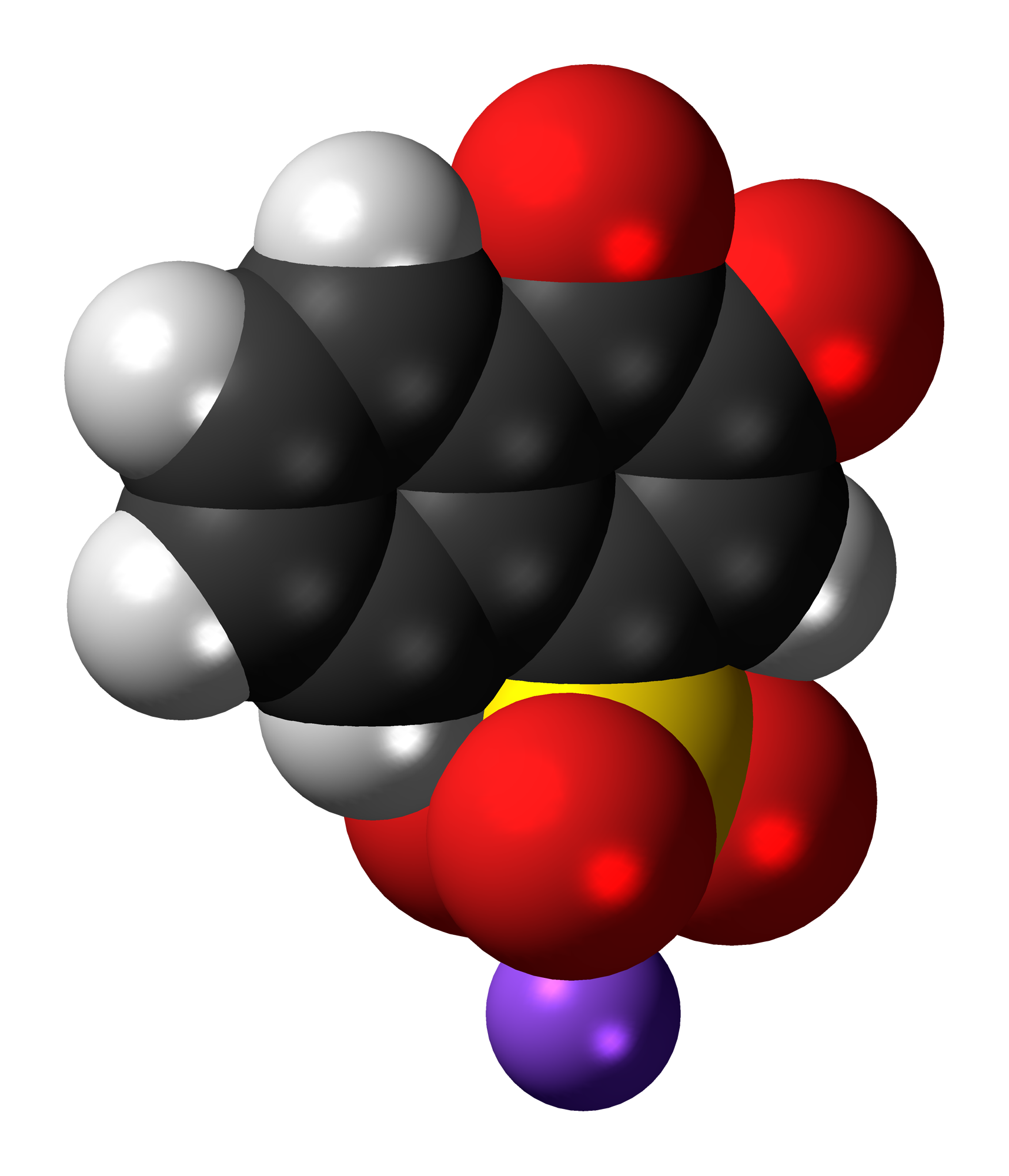

Names
- Preferred IUPAC name Sodium 3,4-dioxo-3,4-dihydronaphthalene-1-sulfonate

Identifiers
CAS Number	521-24-4
3D model (JSmol)	Interactive image
ChemSpider	10190
ECHA InfoCard	100.007.555
EC Number	208-308-9
PubChem CID	10636
UNII	T7185HP5SH
CompTox Dashboard (EPA)	DTXSID8060167
- InChI: InChI=1S/C10H6O5S.Na/c11-8-5-9(16(13,14)15)6-3-1-2-4-7(6)10(8)12;/h1-5H,(H,13,14,15);/q;+1/p-1 Key: UBLXEEBHYISRFM-UHFFFAOYSA-M; InChI=1/C10H6O5S.Na/c11-8-5-9(16(13,14)15)6-3-1-2-4-7(6)10(8)12;/h1-5H,(H,13,14,15);/q;+1/p-1 Key: UBLXEEBHYISRFM-REWHXWOFAQ
- SMILES: C1=CC=C2C(=C1)C(=CC(=O)C2=O)S(=O)(=O)[O-].[Na+]

Properties
Chemical formula	C_{10}H_{5}NaO_{5}S
Molar mass	260.20 g/mol

Hazards
Safety data sheet (SDS)	Oxford MSDS
- Except where otherwise noted, data are given for materials in their standard state (at 25 °C [77 °F], 100 kPa). verify (what is ?) Infobox references

Folin's reagent or sodium 1,2-naphthoquinone-4-sulfonate is a chemical reagent used as a derivatizing agent to measure levels of amines and amino acids. The reagent reacts with them in alkaline solution to produce a fluorescent material that can be easily detected.

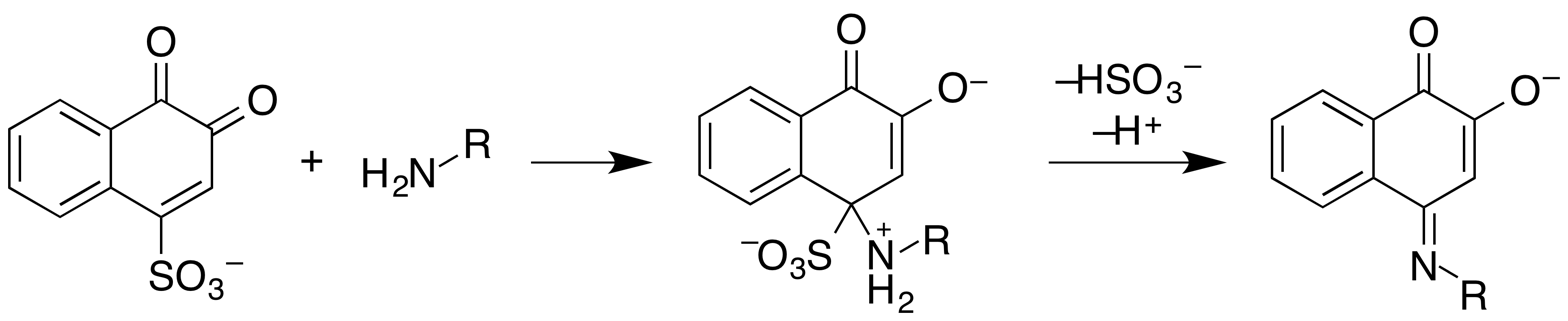

This should not be confused with Folin-Ciocalteu reagent, that is used to detect phenolic compounds.

The Folin reagent can be used with an acidic secondary reagent to distinguish MDMA and related compounds from PMMA and related compounds.

Substance	Reaction
MDMA	Pink
MDE	No Reaction
MDA	Yellow
BZP	Orange to red
TFMPP	Pinkish red
Methylone	No reaction
Methamphetamine	Pink
Amphetamine	Light orange
PMA	Light Yellow
PMMA	Light orange
Ketamine	No reaction
Mescaline	No reaction
Cocaine	No reaction
Aspirin	No reaction
Sugar	No reaction

== See also ==
- Dille–Koppanyi reagent
- Froehde reagent
- Liebermann reagent
- Mandelin reagent
- Marquis reagent
- Mecke reagent
- Pill testing
- Simon's reagent
- Sullivan reaction
- Zwikker reagent
