= Spot plate =

A spot plate, also called a reaction plate, color test plate, or spotting tile (British English), is a laboratory tool made either from ceramics or plastics. Each plate consists of many cavity-like depressions in which only small amount of reactants can be added at a time. The number of wells on each plate vary from 12 to 24 wells allowing multiple reactions to be performed at a time. Plates can vary in their sizes, color and diameter and cavity depth. They are commonly white in color, allowing easy observation of reaction changes and color changes. Porcelain spot plates are considered to be reusable, stronger, highly resistant to the actions of concentrated chemicals and also autoclavable. Clear spot plates are use for observing color reactions with transmitted light.

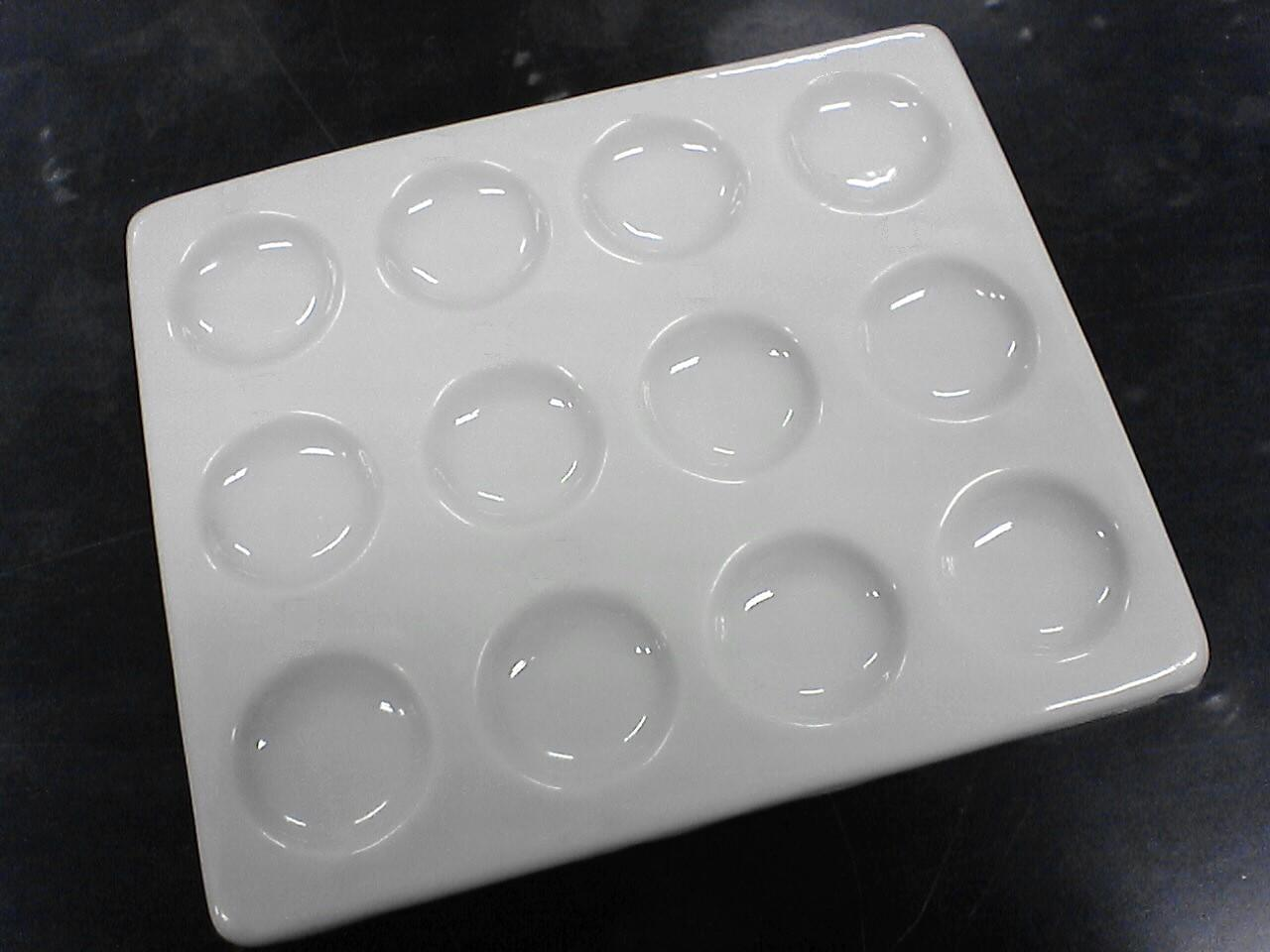
Spot plate

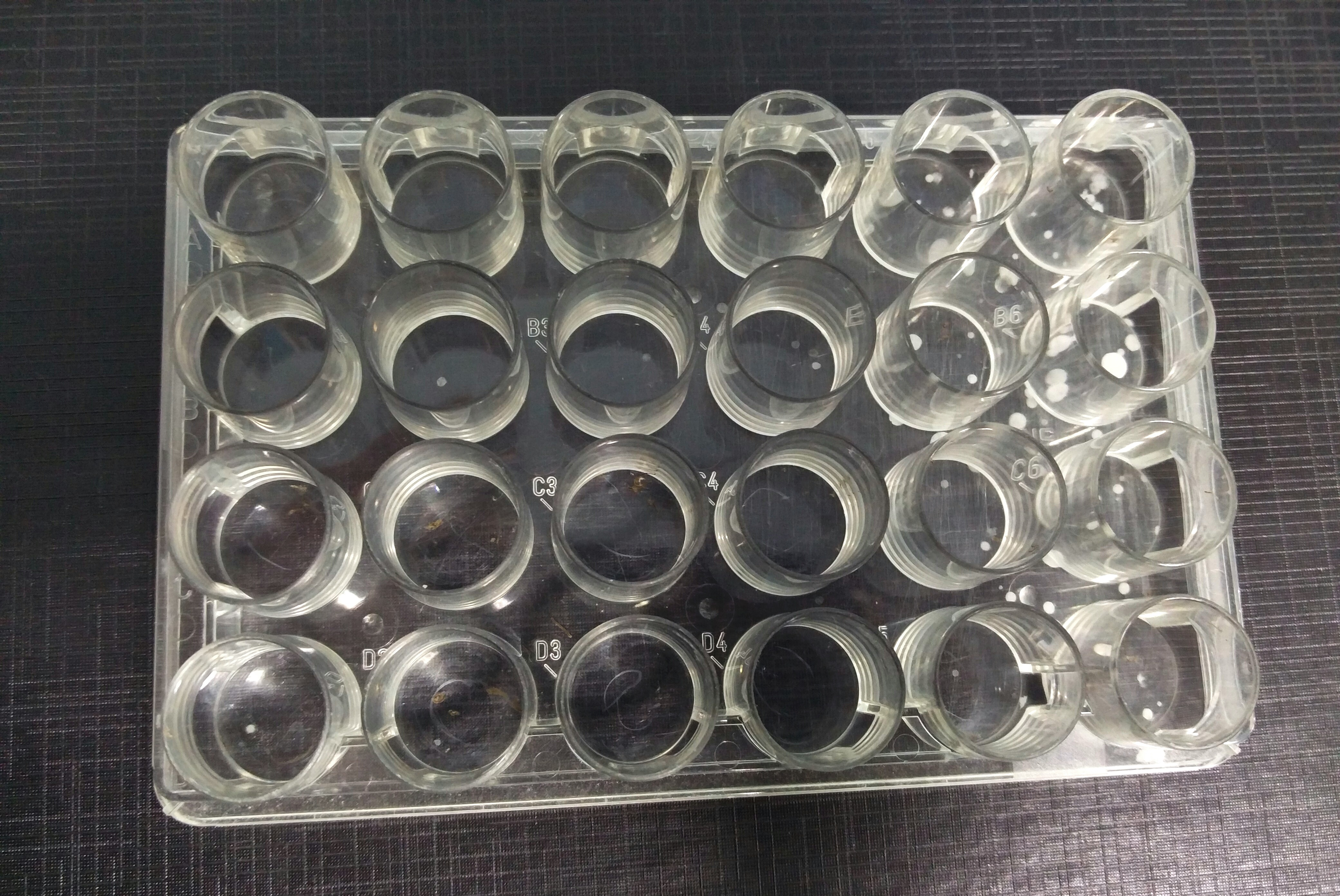
PVC Spot plate: top view (large wells)

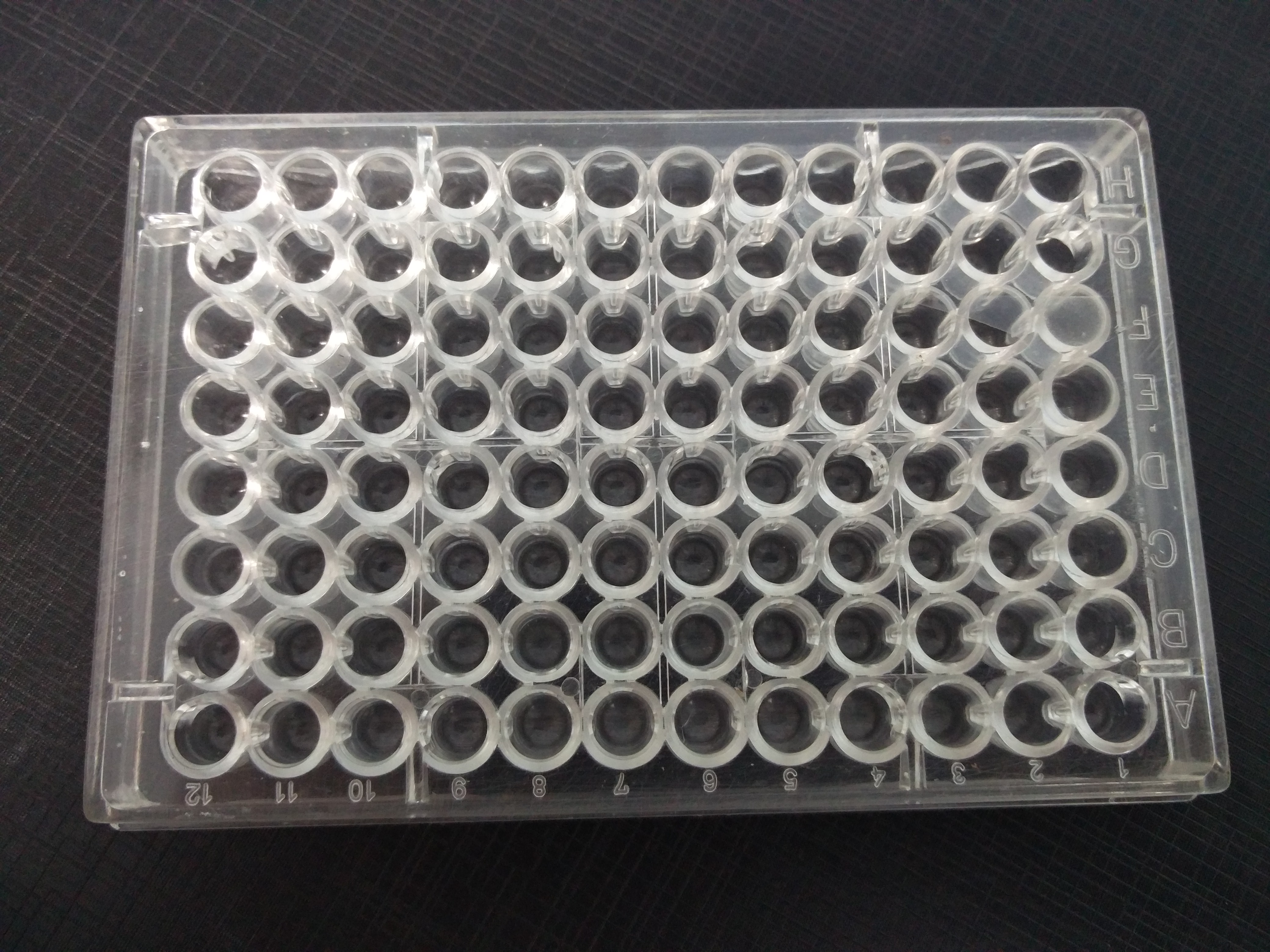
PVC Spot plate: top view (small wells)

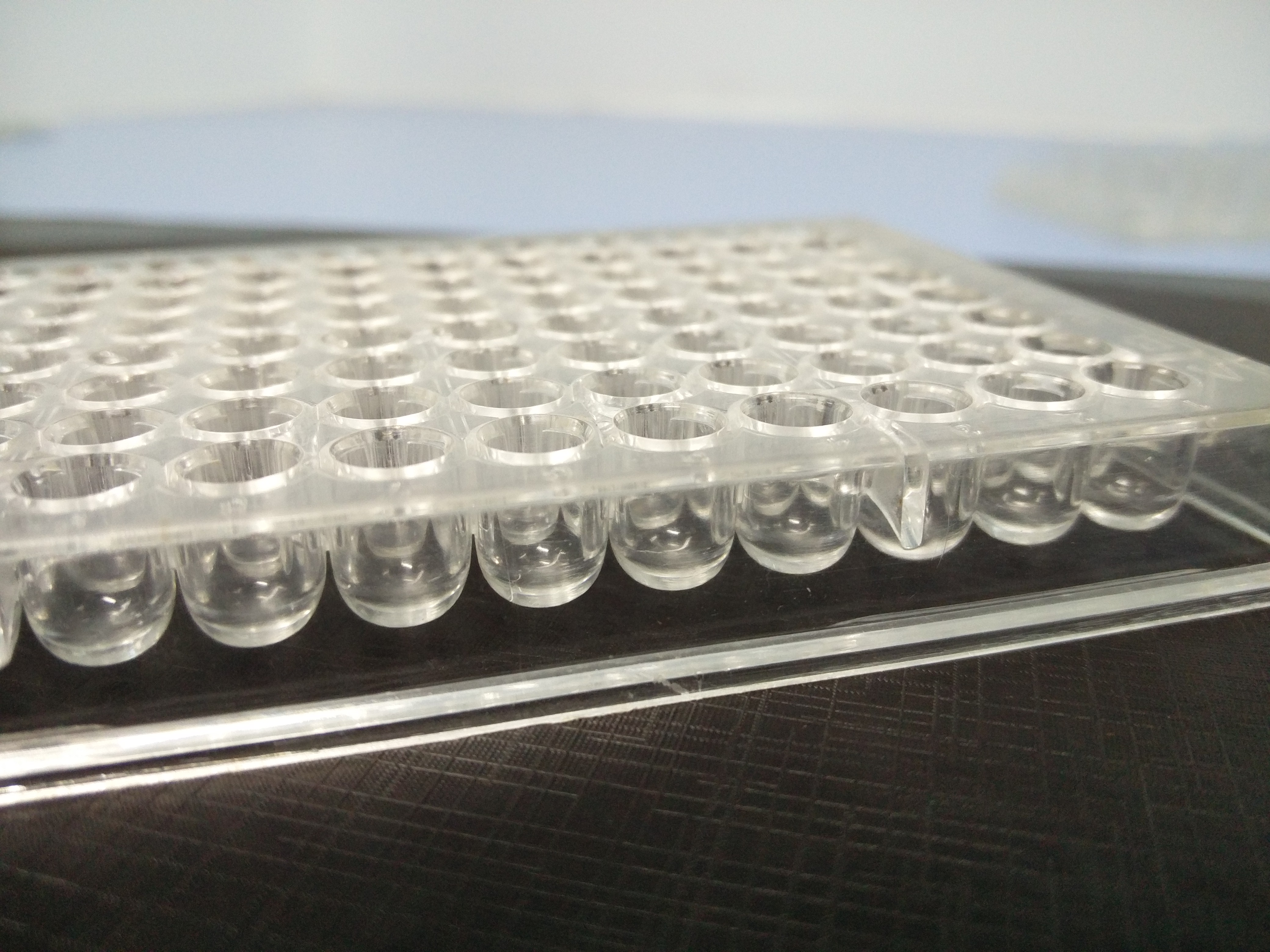
PVC Spot plate: side view

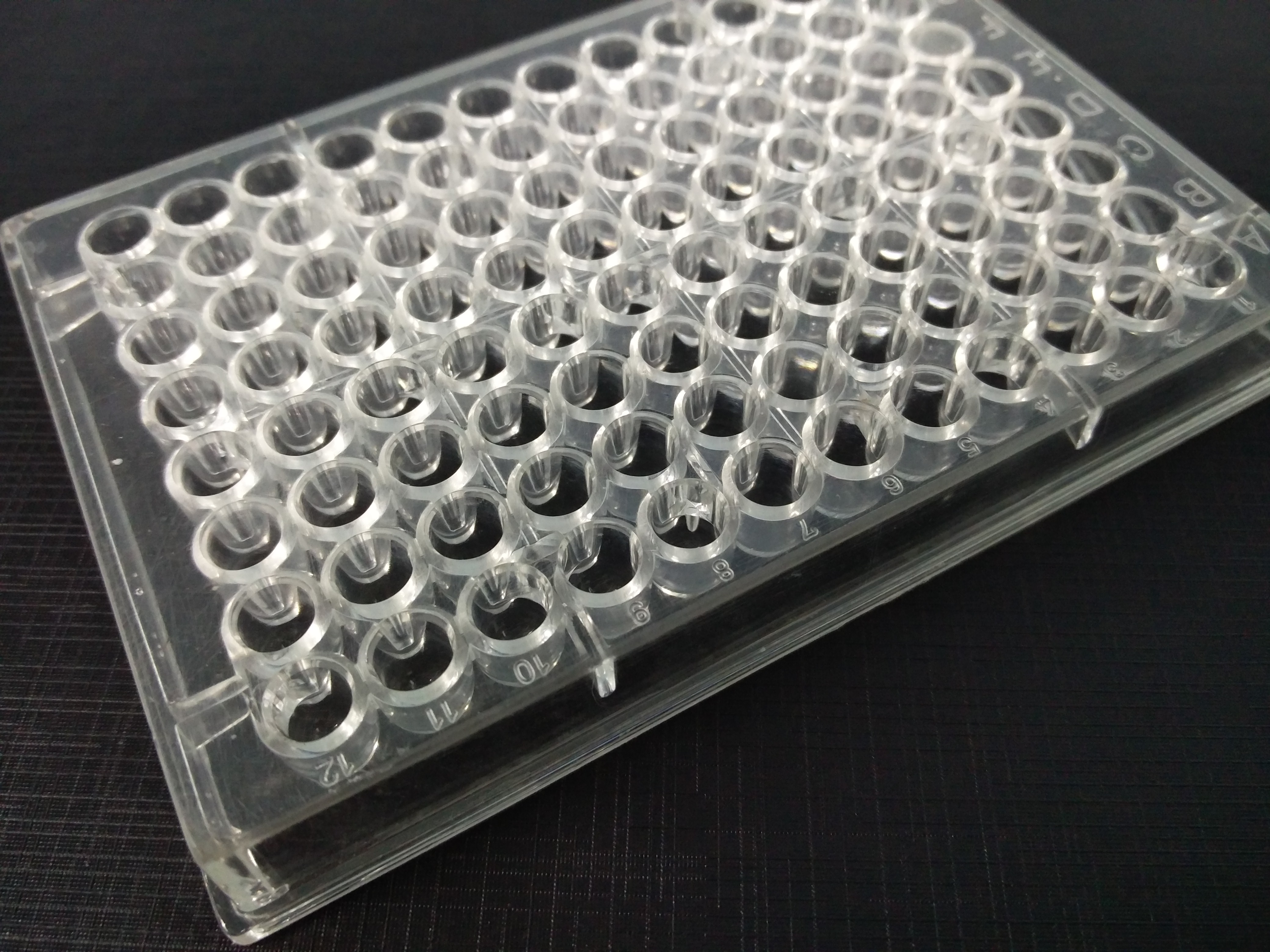
PVC Spot plate: full view
