= Mecke reagent =

Reagent to identify alkaloids

The Mecke reagent is used as a simple spot-test to presumptively identify alkaloids as well as other compounds. It is composed of a mixture of selenous acid and concentrated sulfuric acid, which is dripped onto the substance being tested.

The United States Department of Justice method for producing the reagent is the addition of 100 mL of concentrated (95–98%) sulfuric acid to 1 g of selenous acid. While sale to the general public is legal, it is not recommended as strong corrosives can cause permanent skin and eye damage and require extensive safety ratings.

Final colors produced by Mecke Reagent with various substances
Substance	Color
Chlorpromazine	Blackish red
Codeine	Very dark bluish green
Diacetylmorphine (Heroin)	Deep bluish green
DMMA	Dark brown
Doxepin	Very dark red
Dristan	Light olive brown
Exedrine	Dark greyish yellow
LSD	Greenish black
Mace	Dark greyish olive
Methylenedioxyamphetamine (MDA)	Very dark blue
Mescaline	Moderate olive
Morphine monohydrate	Very dark bluish green
Opium	Olive black
Oxycodone	Moderate olive
Propoxyphene	Deep reddish brown
PMMA	Pale olive green
PMA	Pale olive green or light green
Sugar	Brilliant greenish yellow

== See also ==
- Drug checking
- Dille–Koppanyi reagent
- Folin's reagent
- Froehde reagent
- Liebermann reagent
- Mandelin reagent
- Marquis reagent
- Simon's reagent
- Zwikker reagent
