= Liebermann reagent =

Substance used for chemical testing

The Liebermann reagent named after Hungarian chemist Leo Liebermann (1852-1926) is used as a simple spot-test to presumptively identify alkaloids as well as other compounds. It is composed of a mixture of potassium nitrite and concentrated sulfuric acid. 1 g of potassium nitrite is used for every 10 mL of sulfuric acid. Potassium nitrite may also be substituted by sodium nitrite. It is used to test for cocaine, morphine, PMA and PMMA.

The test is performed by scraping off a small amount of the substance and adding a drop of the reagent (which is initially clear and colorless). The results are analyzed by viewing the color of the resulting mixture, and by the time taken for the change in color to become apparent.

Final colors produced by Liebermann Reagent with various substances
Substance	Color
Alprazolam	No reaction
Cocaine	Yellowish
Morphine	Black
Atropine	Red - orange
Yohimbine	Blue
PMA and PMMA	Purple - brown
MDMA	Intense brown - black
Amphetamine	Orange to red
Methamphetamine	Red
4-FA	Orange
Cathinone	Bright yellow
Methcathinone	Bright yellow
4-MMC	Bright yellow
N,N-DMC	Faint yellow
3-FMC	No reaction
4-MOMC	Faint orange
Methylone	Orange > brown
MDPV	Yellow > green
4-Me-PPP	Orange
Brephedrone	Yellow
4-MEC	Orange
Pentedrone	Yellow
4-Methylbuphedrone	Yellow
Buphedrone	Yellow
Butylone	Yellow > brown or green > brown
3,4-DMMC	Orange
Naphyrone	Brown
Benzedrone	Orange
JWH-307	Dark yellow
AB-001	Dark yellow
CB-13	Dark green
JTE-907	Black (bubbling)
UR-144	Dark red
URB-597	Yellow brown
URB602	Dark brown
URB754	Light brown
AM-1248	Dark yellow
AB-034	Red-orange > dark red
A-796,260	Red-orange > dark red
A-834,735	Red-orange > dark red
FUR-144	Dark red
APINACA	No color change
JWH-073	Yellow - brown
JWH-018	Yellow - brown
JWH-200	Dark yellow - brown
AM-2201	Yellow - brown
JWH-203	Yellow - orange
RCS-4-C4 homolog	Brown
AM-694	Dark yellow
MAM-2201	Green - brown
AM-2233	Yellow
STS-135 (drug)	Brown
4-MeO-PCP	Brown
Methoxetamine	Orange - brown
Ethketamine	Pale yellow
3-HO-PCE	Dark brown
5-MeO-DALT	Dark brown - black
4-methyl-aET	Brown
4-AcO-DALT	Black
4-HO-MET	Black
4-HO-MIPT	Black
4-AcO-DET	Black
DPT	Dark brown
aMT	Black
5-IT	Dark brown
5-APB	Black
6-APB	Dark purple
Camfetamine	Dark red
Methiopropamine	Dark brown
MDAI	Green > black
5-IAI	Dark brown
Pethidine	Red - orange
Mescaline	Black
Allylescaline	Brown - black
2C-T-2	Red
2C-P	Green
2C-C	Yellow > black > clear
2C-B	Yellow → black
b-methoxy-2C-D	Green

== See also ==
- Drug checking
- Liebermann–Burchard test
- Dille–Koppanyi reagent
- Folin's reagent
- Froehde reagent
- Mandelin reagent
- Marquis reagent
- Mecke reagent
- Simon's reagent
- Zwikker reagent
