= Simon's reagent =

Combination used in chemical testing

Simon's reagent is used as a simple spot-test to presumptively identify alkaloids as well as other compounds. It reacts with secondary amines like MDMA and methamphetamine to give a blue solution.

== Uses ==
The primary use of this reagent is for detecting secondary amines, such as MDMA and methamphetamine, and is typically used after the mecke or marquis reagents to differentiate between the two mentioned and amphetamine or MDA.. Also used as a visualization reagent in thin-layer chromatography (TLC).

== Chemistry ==
The reagent is typically provided in two parts:

- A mixture of 2% sodium nitroprusside and 2% acetaldehyde in water (solution A)
- A solution of 2% sodium carbonate in water (solution B)

Separate storage of the aldehyde and base are necessary to prevent aldol polymerisation of the aldehyde.

When exposed to an amine, reaction with acetaldehyde produces the enamine, which subsequently reacts with sodium nitroprusside to the imine. Finally, the iminium salt is hydrolysed to the bright blue Simon-Awe complex.

Acetaldehyde can be replaced with acetone, in which case the reagent detects primary amines instead, giving a purple coloured product.

=== Testing Method ===
A drop from each solution (A and B) is dripped onto the substance being tested, causing the two solutions to mix together.

== See also ==
- Drug checking
- Dille–Koppanyi reagent
- Folin's reagent
- Froehde reagent
- Liebermann reagent
- Mandelin reagent
- Marquis reagent
- Mecke reagent
- Zwikker reagent
