= Liebermann–Burchard test =

Test used for detection of cholesterol

- Purpose: detection of cholesterol

The Liebermann–Burchard or acetic anhydride test is used for the detection of cholesterol. The formation of a green or green-blue colour after a few minutes is positive.

Lieberman–Burchard is a reagent used in a colourimetric test to detect cholesterol, which gives a deep green colour. This colour begins as a purplish, pink colour and progresses through to a light green then very dark green colour. The colour is due to the hydroxyl group (-OH) of cholesterol reacting with the reagents and increasing the conjugation of the un-saturation in the adjacent fused ring. Since this test uses acetic anhydride and sulfuric acid as reagents, caution must be exercised so as not to receive severe burns.

Method: Dissolve one or two crystals of cholesterol in dry chloroform in a dry test tube. Add several drops of acetic anhydride and then 2 drops of concentrated H_{2}SO_{4} and mix carefully. After the reaction is finished, the concentration of cholesterol can be measured using spectrophotometry.
