= Camfetamine =

Chemical compound

Clinical data
- ATC code: none

Identifiers
- IUPAC name: N-methyl-3-phenylbicyclo[2.2.1]heptan-2-amine
- CAS Number: 92499-19-9
- ChemSpider: 26608747
- UNII: 3E7N2GO76U
- CompTox Dashboard (EPA): DTXSID401017199

Chemical and physical data
- Formula: C_{14}H_{19}N
- Molar mass: 201.313 g·mol^{−1}
- 3D model (JSmol): Interactive image
- SMILES: C2CC1CC2C(NC)C1c3ccccc3
- InChI: InChI=1S/C14H19N/c1-15-14-12-8-7-11(9-12)13(14)10-5-3-2-4-6-10/h2-6,11-15H,7-9H2,1H3; Key:CTVMYAZECFXZLN-UHFFFAOYSA-N

Camfetamine (N-methyl-3-phenyl-norbornan-2-amine) is a stimulant drug closely related to the appetite suppressant fencamfamine, being its N-methyl homologue. It has been sold as a designer drug following the banning of mephedrone and related substituted cathinone derivatives in many countries, and reportedly has slightly stronger stimulant effects than fencamfamine, but with correspondingly more severe side effects.

== See also ==
- Dimethocaine
- Ethylphenidate
- Methiopropamine
