= Dristan =

Nasal decongestant medication

Dristan is an American brand of medications that is made by Foundation Consumer Brands. Dristan 12-Hour Nasal Spray is a nasal decongestant, the active ingredient of which is oxymetazoline hydrochloride 0.05%. Dristan Cold Multi-Symptom Tablets contain three active ingredients: acetaminophen, USP 325 mg (a pain reliever and fever reducer), chlorpheniramine maleate, USP 2 mg (an antihistamine), and phenylephrine HCl, USP 5 mg (a nasal decongestant).
