= Benzphetamine =

Anoretic drug

Benzphetamine INN: Benzfetamine

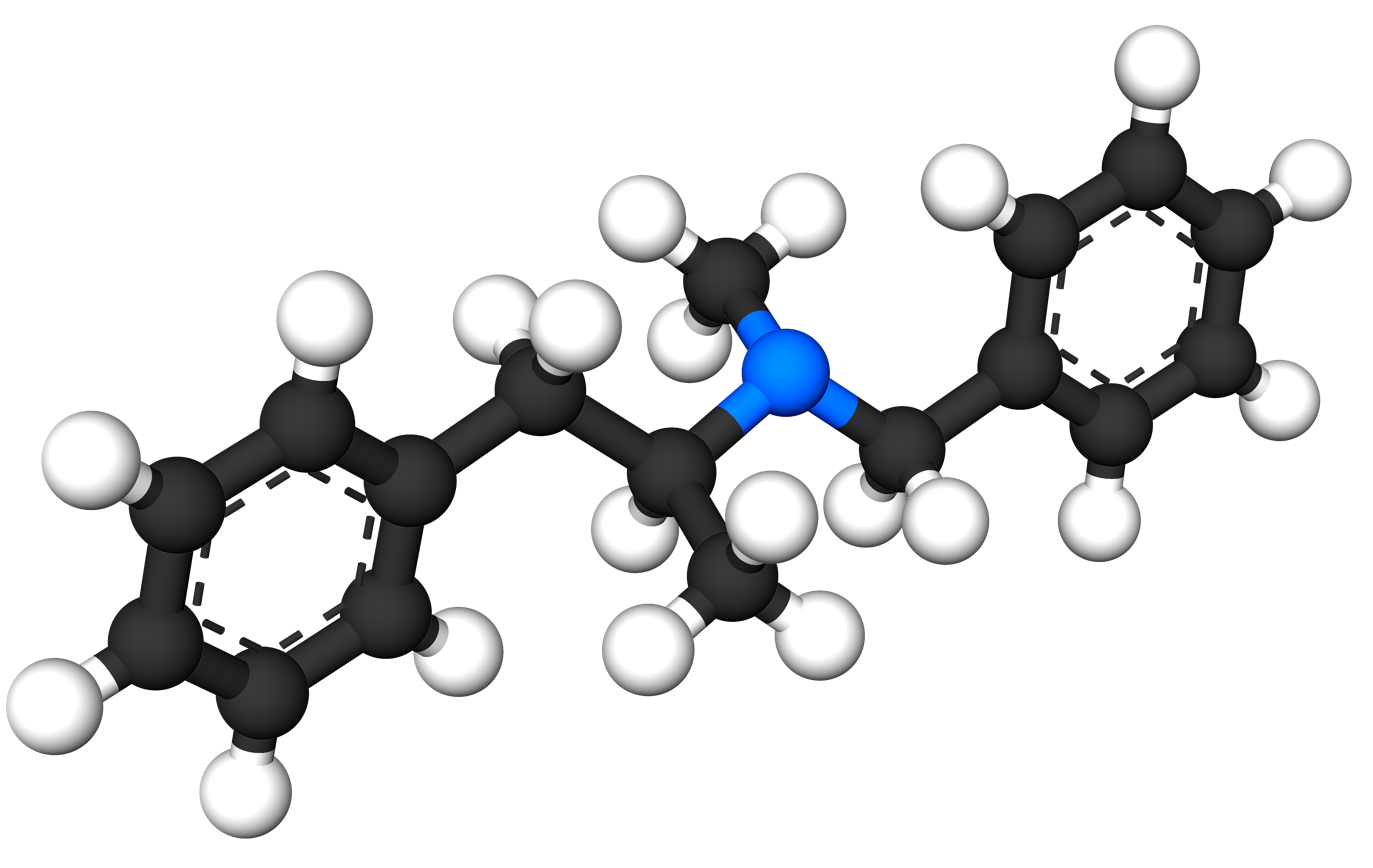

Clinical data
- Trade names: Didrex, others
- Other names: Benzfetamine; d-Benzphetamine; (+)-Benzphetamine; (S)-(+)-Benzphetamine; (S)-Benzphetamine; (2S)-N-Benzyl-N-methylamphetamine; dextro-N-Benzyl-N-methylamphetamine; N-Benzyldextromethamphetamine; (+)-N-Benzyl-N,α-dimethylphenethylamine
- AHFS/Drugs.com: Professional Drug Facts
- License data: US DailyMed: Benzphetamine
- Dependence liability: High
- Routes of administration: By mouth
- ATC code: None

Legal status
- Legal status: AU: S4 (Prescription only); BR: Class F2 (Prohibited psychotropics); CA: Schedule I; DE: Anlage I (Authorized scientific use only); UK: Class C; US: Schedule III

Pharmacokinetic data
- Protein binding: 75–99%
- Metabolites: • Dextromethamphetamine • Dextroamphetamine
- Elimination half-life: 4–6 hours

Identifiers
- IUPAC name: (2S)-N-Benzyl-N-methyl-1-phenylpropan-2-amine
- CAS Number: 156-08-1
- PubChem CID: 5311017
- DrugBank: DB00865
- ChemSpider: 4470556
- UNII: 0M3S43XK27
- KEGG: D07514; D07515
- ChEBI: CHEBI:3044
- ChEMBL: ChEMBL3545985
- CompTox Dashboard (EPA): DTXSID4022656

Chemical and physical data
- Formula: C_{17}H_{21}N
- Molar mass: 239.362 g·mol^{−1}
- 3D model (JSmol): Interactive image
- SMILES: N(C)(Cc1ccccc1)[C@@H](C)Cc2ccccc2
- InChI: InChI=1S/C17H21N/c1-15(13-16-9-5-3-6-10-16)18(2)14-17-11-7-4-8-12-17/h3-12,15H,13-14H2,1-2H3/t15-/m0/s1; Key:YXKTVDFXDRQTKV-HNNXBMFYSA-N

Benzphetamine, sold under the brand name Didrex among others, is an amphetamine-type stimulant and appetite suppressant used short-term for weight loss along with a doctor-approved, reduced-calorie diet, exercise, and behavioral program. It is prescribed for obesity to people who have been unable to lose weight through exercise and dieting alone. It is a prodrug of dextromethamphetamine and dextroamphetamine.

== Mechanism of Action ==
Benzphetamine promotes weight loss by reducing appetite and slightly increasing metabolism. It is the parent compound of clobenzorex, the latter of which is not subject to the Federal Analogue Act, nor scheduled per the Controlled Substances Act of 1970 in the USA.

== Contraindications ==
Benzphetamine is contraindicated in patients with advanced arteriosclerosis, symptomatic cardiovascular disease, moderate to severe hypertension, hyperthyroidism, known hypersensitivity or idiosyncrasy to sympathomimetic amines, and glaucoma, or who have recently used a monoamine oxidase inhibitor (MAOI). Benzphetamine should not be given to patients who are in an agitated state or who have a history of drug misuse.

== Pharmacology ==
Benzphetamine is a sympathomimetic amine and is classified as an anorectic. The drug's main function is to reduce appetite, which in turn reduces caloric intake.

Although the mechanism of action of the sympathomimetic appetite suppressants in the treatment of obesity is not fully known, these medications have pharmacological effects similar to those of amphetamines. Amphetamine and related sympathomimetic medications (such as benzphetamine) are thought to stimulate the release of norepinephrine and/or dopamine from storage sites in nerve terminals of the lateral hypothalamic feeding center, thereby producing a decrease in appetite. This release is mediated through the binding of benzphetamine to VMAT_{2} and inhibiting its function, causing a release of these neurotransmitters into the synaptic cleft through their reuptake transporters. Tachyphylaxis and tolerance have been demonstrated with all drugs of this class.

Benzphetamine has a half-life of 4 to 6 hours.

== Society and culture ==
=== Names ===
Benzfetamine is the international nonproprietary name.

=== Legal status ===
==== United States ====
Benzphetamine is unique in its classification as a Schedule III substance in the United States, given that most members of the amphetamine family are classified in the more highly regulated Schedule II tier. Benzphetamine is metabolized by the human body into amphetamine and methamphetamine, making it a prodrug of the aforementioned molecules, as well as one of a number of substances that convert in vivo into a substance of higher addiction and abuse potential. Clobenzorex, as previously stated, is completely uncontrolled by the Controlled Substances or Federal Analogue Acts, yet is an analog and derivative of benzphetamine.
