= Reagent testing =

Tests for authentication of psychoactive drugs, and detection of adulterants

Reagent testing is one of the processes used to identify substances contained within a pill, usually illicit substances. With the increased prevalence of drugs being available in their pure forms, the terms "drug checking" or "pill testing" may also be used, although these terms usually refer to testing with a wider variety of techniques covered by drug checking.

This short GIF provides clear and easy to follow instructions on how to use a drug checking kit

== Reagent testing notes ==
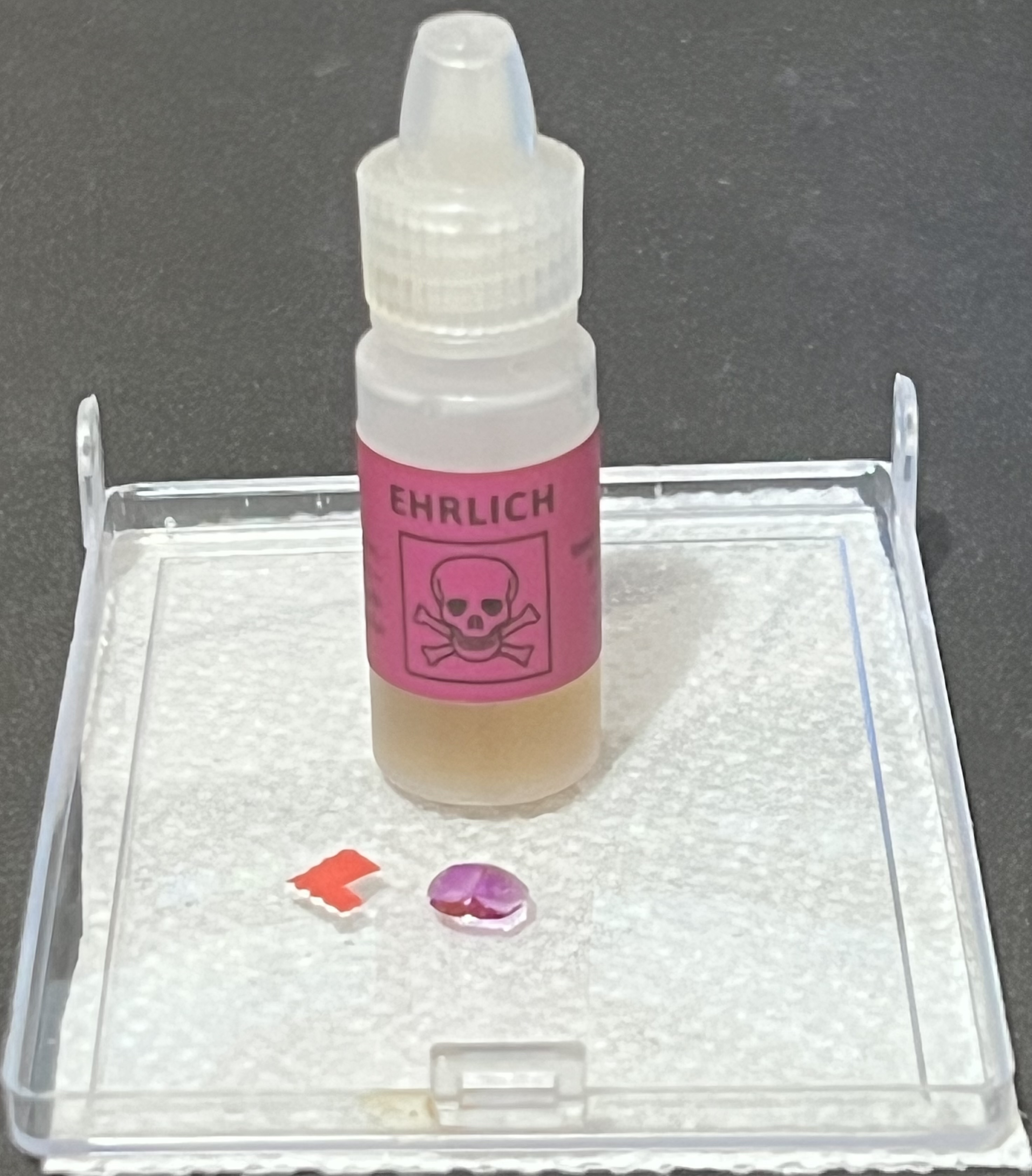
Ehrlich's reagent can be used to test for the presence of LSD. Upon reaction, the Ehrlich's reagent turns to purple indicating the presence of LSD.

A test is done by taking a small scraping from a pill and placing it in the reagent testing liquid or dropping the reagent onto the scraping. The liquid will change colour when reacting with different chemicals to indicate the presence of certain substances.

Testing with a reagent kit does not indicate the pill is safe. While the testing process does show some particular substances are present, it may not show a harmful substance that is also present and unaccounted for by the testing process. Some substances that cause strong colour changes can also mask the presence of other substances that cause weaker colour changes. Thin layer chromatography is used with reagent testing to separate substances before testing and prevent this "masking" effect.

Ehrlich reagent can only detect drugs with an indole moiety, but this is useful because drugs from the NBOMe class do not have an indole and are often sold as LSD which does. The Ehrlich reagent has an additional benefit over other reagents in that it does not react with the paper on which LSD is often distributed.

Reagent tests are often limited to target specific chemicals, and when these substances are mis-sold it is usually by substitution of a different substance in the same chemical family, rendering the test unuseful for consumers. However, reagent tests for chemicals families also exist.

Lacing agents are often used to cut the weight of substances. Some of the most available and non-suspicious cutting agents are reducing sugars: The common dietary monosaccharides galactose, glucose and fructose are all reducing sugars. Sugar is the generic name for sucrose, a disaccharide composed of glucose and fructose.

=== Availability ===
As reagent testing has become more popular, vendors have begun to offer a greater range of tests. This increases the likelihood that a substance might have a unique profile of results, making the tests more useful.

Other reagents are discussed in scientific literature, but limited applications mean they may not be sold for consumer testing.

The National Institute of Justice provides information about "Color Test Reagents/Kits for Preliminary Identification of Drugs of Abuse" in NIJ Standard–0604.01.

Several products are in early phases of development that are intended to allow their users to covertly detect (without using droppers, etc.) date-rape drugs, for instance reusable straws with components that change color in the presence of GHB, Rohypnol, or ketamine – see Date rape drug § Detection.

=== Reliability ===
Results will vary depending on sample adulteration, quantity, temperature, lighting, exposure to air, storage, as well as reagent quality and degradation. Colorimetric techniques have been developed.

If more than one bottle are open at the same time and the cap are put on the wrong reagent bottle, this may cross-contaminate the reagents and ruin them.

According to a 2003 research published in Pharmacotherapy, neither the Marquis, Mecke, nor Simon's reagents should be used by the public for harm reduction purposes. These agents do not help identify pure MDMA tablets. The research team suggests using gas chromatography-mass spectrometry as the most sensitive and specific testing method for identifying MDMA and its contaminants but this is out of reach for users in most countries and reagent tests remain popular, often distributed by harm-reduction organisations due to their low cost and high utility when multiple test reagents are used.

=== Legality ===
==== USA ====
===== Illinois =====
Home pill testing equipment is illegal in the US state of Illinois where the (720 ILCS 600/) Drug Paraphernalia Control Act specifically outlaws "testing equipment intended to be used unlawfully in a private home for identifying or in analyzing the strength, effectiveness or purity of cannabis or controlled substances;"

===== Tennessee =====
Rapid fentanyl test strips are decriminalized in Tennessee. Representative William Lamberth, R-Portland, introduced HB2177 in the Tennessee General Assembly on January 31, 2022, followed by the introduction of SB2427 by Senator Jack Johnson, R-Franklin, the following day. The bill was eventually passed by Governor Bill Lee on March 31. Fentanyl test strips were previously considered drug paraphernalia by Tennessee Code Annotated §39-17-402, which defines terms such as controlled substance and drug paraphernalia in Tennessee state law. Per TCA §39-17-425, possession of fentanyl test strips was previously a Class A misdemeanor, punishable by up to 11 months, 29 days in jail and fines of up to $2,500; distributing them was previously a Class E felony, punishable by prison sentences of one to six years and fines of up to $3,000.

== Acid–base reaction ==
Bases (e.g. sodium bicarbonate) or acids (e.g. citric acid) are sometimes used as cutting agents. An individual base solution and acid solution can help determine if the substance contains an acid or base respectively, if an acid–base reaction will occur.

== Alternative consumer solutions ==
Common cutting agents:

- Sugar: Brix refractometers are used to determine sugar content. Traditional handheld refractometers are cheap and can be used to measure whole percentages. Digital handheld refractometers are used to determine percentages in decimal values.

== Media ==
- 2014 documentary What's In My Baggie? deals with adulterants and additives in recreational drugs.
- Largest public accessible database with reagent test results and their sources

== See also ==
- Counterfeit medications
- Drug checking
- Harm reduction
