= Aspirin/paracetamol/caffeine =

Analgesic drug combination

Combination of
- Aspirin: Non-steroidal anti-inflammatory drug (NSAID)
- Paracetamol: Analgesic
- Caffeine: Stimulant

Clinical data
- Trade names: Various
- AHFS/Drugs.com: Multum Consumer Information
- Routes of administration: By mouth
- ATC code: N02BA51 (WHO)

Legal status
- Legal status: US: OTC

Identifiers
- CAS Number: 53908-21-7
- PubChem CID: 9871508
- ChemSpider: 8047198

Chemical and physical data
- 3D model (JSmol): Interactive image
- SMILES: O=C(Nc1ccc(O)cc1)C.O=C(O)c1ccccc1OC(=O)C.O=C2N(c1ncn(c1C(=O)N2C)C)C
- InChI: InChI=1S/C9H8O4.C8H10N4O2.C8H9NO2/c1-6(10)13-8-5-3-2-4-7(8)9(11)12;1-10-4-9-6-5(10)7(13)12(3)8(14)11(6)2;1-6(10)9-7-2-4-8(11)5-3-7/h2-5H,1H3,(H,11,12);4H,1-3H3;2-5,11H,1H3,(H,9,10); Key:BKMBGNWZSQNIKU-UHFFFAOYSA-N

Aspirin/paracetamol/caffeine, sold under brand names including Excedrin and Anadin Extra, is a combination drug for the treatment of pain, especially tension headache and migraine. It contains aspirin, a non-steroidal anti-inflammatory drug; paracetamol (acetaminophen), an analgesic; and caffeine, a stimulant.

== Efficacy ==
All active treatments except caffeine differed significantly from placebo, with superior efficacy of the triple combination; well tolerated; low incidence of adverse events.

== Adverse effects ==
The recommended dosing has a low risk profile when taken occasionally in a well hydrated state. As with all medications containing paracetamol (acetaminophen), concomitant use with alcohol carries a significant risk of hepatotoxicity. The combination of paracetamol with aspirin also creates the risk of renal papillary necrosis if large doses are taken chronically. This is because paracetamol yields a toxic metabolite that can accumulate in the kidney while aspirin works to deplete the glutathione stores necessary to oxidize it. Additionally, chronic aspirin usage is associated with increased risk of gastrointestinal bleeding.

== Society and culture ==
=== Brand names ===
The combination was first introduced as the name Trigesic, as the formula of 125 mg paracetamol, 230 mg aspirin, and 30 mg caffeine, in July 1950 by Squibb, which is now Bristol Myers Squibb, but was recalled in the following year due to several reports that the drug might cause blood dyscrasia. In 1965 it was marketed under the trade name Vanquish by Sterling Drug, which after a series of mergers and acquisitions became a unit of Bayer AG.

In the UK it is sold as Anadin Extra. In the US, it is the brand Excedrin's flagship product. In Germany, it is sold as Dolomo, Dolopyrin AL, HA-Tabletten, Melabon K, Neuralgin, ratiopyrin, Thomapyrin Classic, Thomapyrin Intensiv, in Austria as Thomapyrin, and InfluASS, in Israel as Acamol Focus, Paramol Target and Exidol, in Romania as Antinevralgic P and Antinevralgic Forte, and in Russia, Belarus and Eastern Europe as Citramon.

In South Africa and neighbouring countries, it is known as Grand-Pa, and is most commonly sold as a powder.
