= 3,4-Dimethoxymethamphetamine =

Chemical compound

Clinical data
- Other names: DMMA

Legal status
- Legal status: DE: Anlage I (Authorized scientific use only)

Identifiers
- IUPAC name: 1-(3,4-Dimethoxyphenyl)-N-methylpropan-2-amine
- CAS Number: 33236-61-2
- PubChem CID: 12235308
- ChemSpider: 10467995
- UNII: DYR9FZ92LL
- CompTox Dashboard (EPA): DTXSID20903160

Chemical and physical data
- Formula: C_{12}H_{19}NO_{2}
- Molar mass: 209.289 g·mol^{−1}
- 3D model (JSmol): Interactive image
- SMILES: COc1cc(CC(C)NC)ccc1OC
- InChI: InChI=1S/C12H19NO2/c1-9(13-2)7-10-5-6-11(14-3)12(8-10)15-4/h5-6,8-9,13H,7H2,1-4H3; Key:BUWHCARWGYFQPE-UHFFFAOYSA-N

3,4-Dimethoxy-N-methylamphetamine (DMMA) is a psychoactive drug and research chemical of the phenethylamine and amphetamine chemical classes. It appears to act as a serotonin–norepinephrine–dopamine releasing agent (SNDRA), although it is significantly less potent than MDMA.

== See also ==
- Substituted methoxyphenethylamine
