= Drug checking =

Harm reduction technique

Drug checking or pill testing is a way to reduce the harm from drug consumption by allowing users to find out the content and purity of substances that they intend to consume. This enables users to make safer choices: to avoid more dangerous substances, to use smaller quantities, and to avoid dangerous combinations.

Drug checking services have developed over the last twenty-five years in twenty countries and are being considered in more countries, although attempts to implement them in some countries have been hindered by local laws. Drug checking initially focused on MDMA users in electronic dance music events but the services have broadened as drug use has become more complex. These developments have been strongly affected by local laws and culture, resulting in a diverse range of services, both for mobile services that attend events and festivals and fixed sites in town centres and entertainment districts. For instance, staff may or may not be able to handle illegal substances, which limits the use of testing techniques to those where the staff are not legally in possession of those substances.

People intending to take drugs provide a small sample to the testing service (often less than a single dose). Test results may be provided immediately, after a short waiting period, or later. Drug checking services use this time to discuss health risks and safe behaviour with the service users. The services also provide public health information about drug use, new psychoactive substances and trends at a national level. In recent years, in the United States, drug checking programs have played a critical role in identifying novel adulterants in the opioid supply. Recently, drug checking services have allowed for the identification and characterization of the emergence of medetomidine which has resulted in public health alerts that are informing public health action.

== History ==
The earliest reported drug checking activity began in Amsterdam in November 1970 with a group from the University Hospital of Amsterdam and samples obtained through psychiatrists working with people who used drugs.

The earliest reported drug checking service is the Drug Information and Monitoring System (DIMS) in the Netherlands supported by the Ministry of Health, Welfare and Sport. Since 1992 the service has tested over 100,000 drug samples at a national network of twenty-three testing facilities. Service users receive results within a week via phone or email and the service publishes aggregated results describing what substances are in use.

In 2008, the Trans-European Drug Information network (TEDI) was created, a database compiling information from different non-profit drug checking services located in different European countries.

On March 31, 2017, a coalition of drug safety organisations hosted the first-ever International Drug Checking Day to raise awareness of safer drug use. The initiative was aimed at recreational users, with a particular emphasis on the nightlife community, and aims to promote harm reduction—accepting that people will choose to take drugs, and providing them with tools to minimise the risks.

In November 2021 New Zealand became the first country to make drug checking fully legal after previously allowing this under temporary legislation. Other countries like the Netherlands allow drug checking but do not have legislation to protect the clients or testers, and the practice exists in a legal grey area in countries like the US and UK.

== Approaches to drug checking ==
=== Front-of-house testing ===
Front-of-house testing provides testing services to clients at events. It provides real-time, as-you-wait results.

=== Back-of-house testing ===
Back-of-house testing is more restrictive. The substances tested do not come directly from event participants. Instead, they may come from samples confiscated by police or event security or samples that are disposed of via drug amnesty bins. The results may not be available to event attendees.

=== Middle-of-house testing ===
Middle-of-house testing is a new development, started by The Loop in the UK. Testing happens on-site, but without face-to-face interaction with the public. Samples from medical incidents are tested and alerts can be issued after multiple incidents with a trend are identified.

=== Testing outside events ===
Static testing sites provide testing services to clients at fixed locations away from events. Often these are in the entertainment districts of cities.

Off-site testing occurs away from events and away from clients. Clients submit samples by post or at drop-off locations. Those samples are analysed and then the results are publicised.

The UK's first trial of community-based drug safety testing was carried out in Bristol and Durham in 2018 in a church, a drugs service, and a youth and community centre. Users reported that they intended to carry out a range of harm reduction actions such as alerting friends and acquaintances, being more careful mixing substances, consuming lowered dosage, and disposing of substances.

== Analysis methods ==
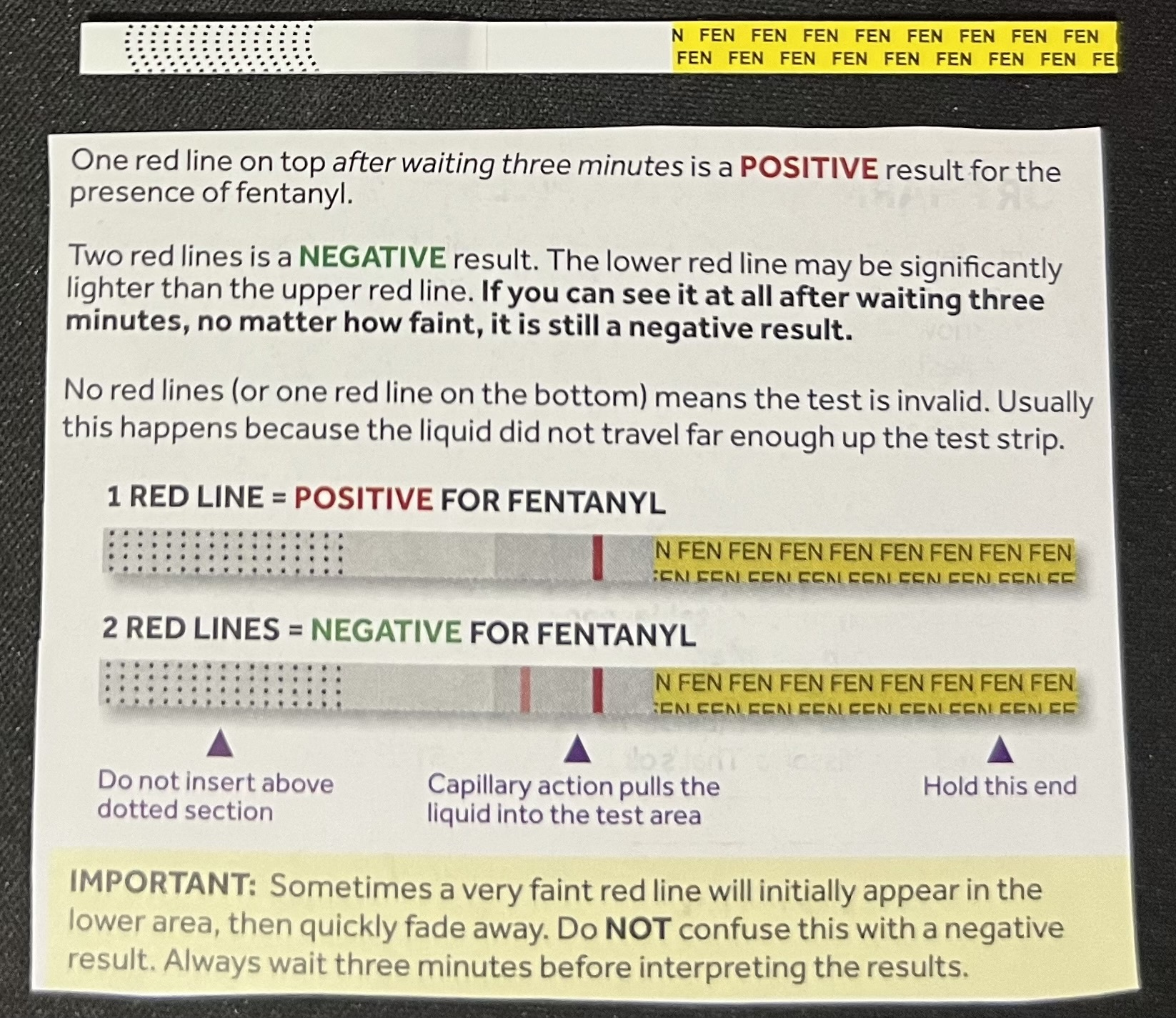
A fentanyl test strip.

A range of analysis techniques are in use by drug checking services. The most common are reagent testing, fourier transform infrared spectroscopy, ultraviolet-visible spectroscopy, raman spectroscopy, mass spectrometry and gas chromatography mass spectrometry.

Reagent testing uses chemical indicators that show a colour change in the presence of particular drugs. These tests are widely available and affordable. The use of several reagents is generally necessary to positively identify a substance with Marquis, Mandelin, and Mecke reagents being used to detect MDMA and Ehrlich's reagent common for detecting LSD. However, reagent testing only indicates the presence of a substance, not the absence of contaminants or other substances. This can provide a false sense of security when illicit drugs are deliberately adulterated to fool reagent tests.

The presence of specific drugs can also be detected through immunoassay testing strips. Testing strips for fentanyl can detect a few tens of nanograms of the substance at a price of a few dollars per test. Recent increased demand for immunoassay test strips, lack of regulation, and approval to use federal funding for test strip purchasing in the US have led to a boom in test strip manufacturers creating concern in drug checking programs and harm reduction organizations about the lack of validation, consistency, and accuracy of results.

Fourier transform infrared spectroscopy is a rapid test using robust hardware that can be carried out in the field. It provides sample identification and mixture analysis, allowing the detection of impurities and adulterants. It is highly sensitive and can carry out analysis using only a few milligrams of a sample. It is semi-quantitative and can provide an indication of purity. For these reasons, it is widely used by both fixed and mobile testing services and considered the best technology to use.

Gas chromatography mass spectrometry provides very sensitive and quantified information about substances. However, the high price and delicate equipment generally limit the use of this technique to fixed sites.

=== Development ===
Developing technologies include:

- Ion-trap mass spectrometry
- Laser-induced immunofluorometric biosensors
- Magnetic levitation
- Nuclear magnetic resonance spectroscopy

== Effectiveness of drug checking ==
Drug checking has been shown to be an effective way to reduce the harm from drug use through informing safer use, limiting use, and helping users avoid the most dangerous substances. Drug checking services also reach drug users who are not reached by existing services. Evidence from research conducted by Austrian pill testing service CheckIt! found 58% of people who use the service would not otherwise seek out harm reduction information, and about 75% are more likely to access harm reduction services if pill testing is included.

Academic research from the UK has found that one in five substances were not what they were expected to be and two-thirds of misrepresented samples were disposed of. Such on-site testing accesses otherwise hard-to-reach user groups to reduce the harms associated with drug use.

Research that followed-up people who had used drug checking services in the UK revealed that those people acted upon the harm reduction advice that they received from the service. Those people disposed of unwanted substances, reduced their dosage of wanted substances, and reduced their risk of overdose. People also followed those risk management practices after attending festivals, alerted friends to the risks of drug use, and continued to follow that advice.

In a peer-reviewed study published in Journal of Psychopharmacology, researchers at Johns Hopkins found that people were about half as likely (relative risk = 0.56) to report intent to use a product if testing did not identify the substance as MDMA, and this was a statistically significant reduction.

== See also ==
- Counterfeit drug
- Dille–Koppanyi reagent
- Drug education
- Drug test
- Ehrlich's reagent
- Folin's reagent
- Froehde reagent
- Harm reduction
- Liebermann reagent
- Mandelin reagent
- Marquis reagent
- Mecke reagent
- Simon's reagent
- Reagent testing
- Trans-European Drug Information
- Zwikker reagent
- Needle exchange
