= Dille–Koppanyi reagent =

The Dille–Koppanyi reagent is used as a simple spot-test to presumptively identify barbiturates. It is composed of a mixture of two solutions. Part A is 0.1 g of cobalt(II) acetate dihydrate dissolved in 100 ml of methanol mixed with 0.2 ml of glacial acetic acid. Part B made up of is 5% isopropylamine (v/v) in methanol. Two drops of A are dropped onto the substance followed by one drop of B and any change in colour is observed.

The test turns phenobarbital, pentobarbital, amobarbital and secobarbital light purple by complexation of cobalt with the barbiturate nitrogens. The test, in a slightly different formulation, was developed in the 1930s by the Hungarian-American pharmacologist Theodore Koppanyi (1901–1985) and the American Biochemist, James Madison Dille (1928–1986).

== See also ==
- Drug checking
- Marquis reagent
- Froehde's reagent
- Zwikker reagent
