= Zwikker reagent =

The Zwikker reagent is used as a simple spot-test to presumptively identify barbiturates. It is composed of a mixture of two solutions. Part A is 0.5 g of copper (II) sulfate in 100 ml of distilled water. Part B consists of 5% pyridine (v/v) in chloroform. One drop of each is added to the substance to be tested and any change in colour is observed.

The test turns phenobarbital, pentobarbital and secobarbital light purple. Tea and tobacco turn yellow-green.

The test's lack of specificity and tendency to produce false positives means it is not widely used for presumptive drug testing, although it does still play a role as a thin layer chromatography stain.

It is named after the Dutch scientist Cornelis Zwikker.

== See also ==
- Drug checking
- Marquis reagent
- Froehde's reagent
- Dille–Koppanyi reagent
