= Lacing (drugs) =

Adulteration of drugs

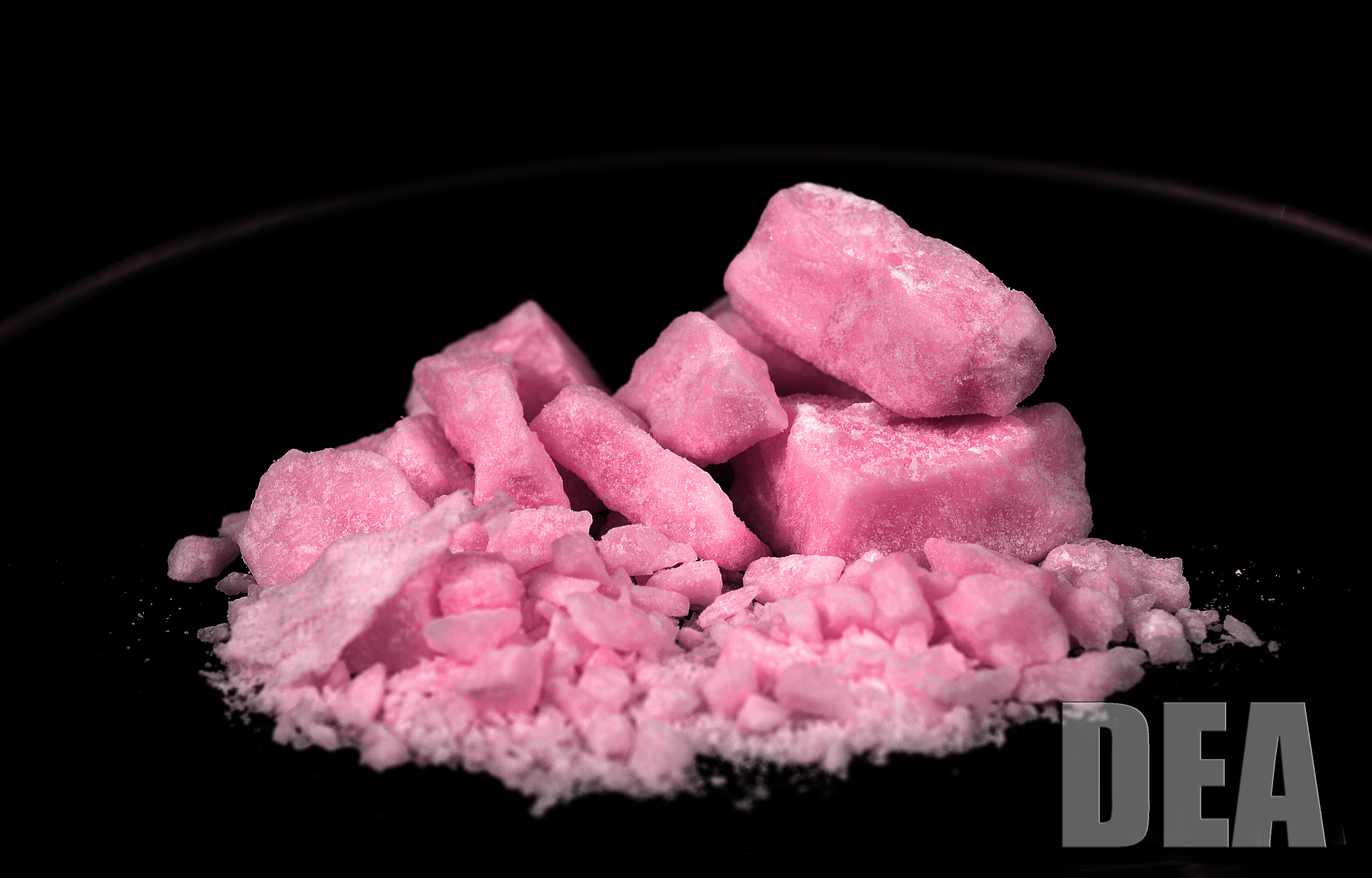
Methamphetamine adulterated with pink food coloring, a harmless form of lacing

Lacing or cutting, in drug culture, refer to the act of using a substance (referred to as the lacing agent or cutting agent) to adulterate substances independent of the reason. The resulting substance is laced or cut.

Some street drugs are commonly laced with other chemicals for various reasons, but it is most commonly done to bulk up the original product or to sell other, cheaper drugs in the place of something more expensive. Individuals sometimes lace their own drugs with another substance to combine or alter the physiological or psychoactive effects.

== Overview ==
The classical model of drug cutting refers to the way that illicit drugs were diluted at each stage of the chain of distribution.

Drug markets have changed considerably since the 1980s; greater competition, and a shift from highly structured (and thus controlled) to greatly fragmented markets, has generated competition among dealers in terms of purity. Many drugs that reach the street are now only cut at the manufacture/producer stage, and this may be more a matter of lacing the drug with another substance designed to appeal to the consumer, as opposed to simple diluents that increase the profit for the seller. The extent of cutting can vary significantly over time but for the last 15 years drugs such as cocaine ranged in Europe on average from 32% to 65% in purity. Heroin purity at 50% does not signify 50% cutting agents; other adulterants could include other opiate by-products of making heroin from opium. Furthermore heroin base can only have a max purity of 61% while heroin HCl can be up to 98% pure. Coomber, after having street heroin seizures from the UK re-analysed, reported that nearly 50% of the samples had no cutting agents present at all. This means that 50% of street heroin in the UK in 1995 had worked its way from producer to user without being cut at any stage, although other adulterants may have been present. Other research outlined how drug dealers have other ways of making profit without having to resort to cutting the drugs they sell.

Cocaine has been cut with various substances ranging from flour and powdered milk to ground drywall, mannitol, baking soda, and other common, easily obtainable substances. Levamisole and other PTHIT substances also remain in frequent use as cutting agent.

Most illicit drugs are adulterated to some degree. Some street drugs can be as low as 10–15% of the active drug, with the other (85–90%) not necessarily being the cutting agent. In fact a heroin sample of only 20% purity may have no cutting agents in it at all. The other 80% may be impurities produced in the manufacturing process and substances created as by products of this process and/or degradation of the drug if improperly stored.

When choosing a cutting agent, the drug manufacturer or dealer would ideally attempt to find a chemical that is inexpensive, easy to obtain, relatively non-toxic, and mimics the physical attributes of the drug to be adulterated. For example, if a drug is soluble in water, the preferred adulterant would also be water-soluble. Similar melting and boiling points are also important if the drug is to be smoked.

== Types of lacing agents ==
=== Non-psychoactive lacing agents ===
==== Visually mimics ====
Some fake drugs consist of substances from relatively harmless sources, such as grocery store goods like flour, oregano or allergy pills. Even despite the substances' harmlessness, legal penalties for the crime of selling them can include time in jail.

==== Flavor masker ====
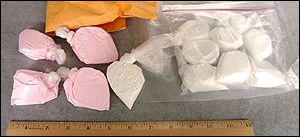
Cocaine adulterated with fruit flavoring

Sometimes a flavor masker is added to give a more pleasant experience.

=== Psychoactive mimics ===
Lacing/cutting agents may be psychoactive.

Certain fake drugs include other controlled drugs, or they may include synthetic drugs with similar properties. Uncertainty of an identity of the substance may increase the risk of an overdose.

A related, yet distinct problem is the trade of counterfeit medications with pills including substances such as fentanyl which can be used recreationally.

==== Levamisole ====
Levamisole is frequently used to cut cocaine.

In the body, levamisole is converted into aminorex, a substance with amphetamine-like stimulant effects and a long duration of action.

Despite yielding these desired stimulant effects as a psychoactive mimic, levamisole is also associated with levamisole-induced necrosis syndrome.

== Reasons for lacing ==
=== Illegal drug trade ===
Drugs may be sold to end users who are unaware they have been laced or are unaware what was used to lace them. At various points in the supply chain, in order to maximize profitability, many drugs are adulterated with cutting agents. Substances with similar physical and/or chemical properties can be used so the end product most closely resembles what it is purported to be. Inert substances with similar physical properties can be used to increase weight without changing the look and feel. Less expensive or easier to obtain compounds with similar chemical properties may be used to lace heavily adulterated drugs while still maintaining some psychoactive potency.

=== Mickey Finn ===
In slang, a Mickey Finn—or simply a Mickey—is a drink laced with a psychoactive drug or incapacitating agent (especially chloral hydrate) given to someone without their knowledge, with intent to incapacitate them.

=== Poly drug use ===
Drugs may also be laced with the end user being made aware of the lacing. In this case, rather than as an adulteration, the lacing is intended to make the product more desirable. Sometimes less potent, often less expensive drugs, are laced with a small amount of a more potent, often more expensive drug. This may be used to facilitate the ingestion of drugs or to allow the simultaneous ingestion of multiple drugs. Cigarettes laced with PCP allow users to take in the liquid PCP through smoking and some multi drug users report intentionally buying marijuana laced with methamphetamine.

== Commonly laced substances ==
=== Dietary supplements ===
==== CBD ====
- Cannabidiol (CBD) is often cut with synthetic cannabinoids.

=== Street drugs ===
Drug 1	Drug 2	Drug 3	Poly drug name	Intoxication name	Comment
Any synthetic opioids	Opioids		Gray death		Synthetic opioids sold to maximize profitability
Alcohol	Barbiturates		Geronimo. Wild geronimo		
Alcohol	Chloral hydrate		Mickey Finn		In slang, a Mickey Finn—or simply a Mickey—is a drink laced with a psychoactive drug or incapacitating agent (especially chloral hydrate) given to someone without their knowledge, with intent to incapacitate them.
Alcohol (moonshine)	Methanol				List of methanol poisoning incidents
Cannabis	Embalming fluid		Illy. Love boat		The use of fry (embalming fluid and PCP-laced cigarettes or marijuana sticks) among crack cocaine smokers. Embalming fluid has been found as a by-products of PCP manufacture.
Cannabis	Formaldehyde	PCP	Wet		Marijuana cigarettes dipped into or laced with other substances, typically formaldehyde, phencyclidine, or both, are known as "wet" and have caused respiratory failure.
Cannabis	Formaldehyde		Clicker, dank. Love boat		Marijuana cigarettes dipped into or laced with other substances, typically formaldehyde, phencyclidine, or both, are known as "wet" and have caused respiratory failure.
Cannabis	PCP	Embalming fluid	Fry, fry sticks. Love boat		Embalming fluid has been found as a by-products of PCP manufacture.
Crack-cocaine	Benzocaine		Coco snow		Crack cut with benzocaine. Benzocaine is a dental anaesthetic that mimics coke's numbing effect.
Crack-cocaine	Procaine		Double rock		Crack cut with procaine. Procaine is a dental anaesthetic that mimics coke's numbing effect.
LSD	Strychnine		Back breakers (sometimes backbreaker)		Strychnine has been found in murder or attempted murder investigations where someone was being specifically targeted for poisoning.
Heroin	Motion sickness medication		Polo		This combination caused dozens of overdoses in Newark, New Jersey, the police and doctors said they suspected that one dealer in the area had been trying to improve his profit margin by diluting his heroin supply with scopolamine, the main ingredient in skin patches used to prevent motion sickness.
Heroin	Scopolamine or strychnine		Spike		Strychnine has been found in murder or attempted murder investigations where someone was being specifically targeted for poisoning.
Heroin	Xylazine		Tranq		Xylazine is a horse anesthetic. Heroin is now commonly laced or replaced with Fentanyl.
PCP	Gasoline		Octane		PCP laced with gasoline. Cigarettes or joints are soaked in the solution that quickly evaporates.

==== Depressants ====
===== Heroin =====
Heroin is commonly cut with quinine, caffeine, dimethocaine, lidocaine, procaine, lactose, inositol, dextrose, mannitol, and starch.

Other opioids are sometimes sold as heroin or cut with heroin. Fentanyl sold as or laced into heroin has made the news in the past due to the numerous fatalities it causes when it appears on the market. Recently, Fentanyl and close analogues have been produced in pure powder form for very cheap. Dealers may cut with or sell heroin with Fentanyl due to the street cost of Fentanyl versus the cost of heroin. The potency of such mixtures (especially if made carelessly) can be far above that of pure heroin, and users frequently overdose due to this. Gray death is a street drug in the United States. Samples have been found to contain the designer drug U-47700, heroin and opioids including fentanyl and carfentanil.

====== α-Methylfentanyl ======
In 1976, α-Methylfentanyl ("China White") began to appear mixed with heroin, as an additive, and the mixture was sometimes also called "China White". It was first identified in the bodies of two drug overdose victims in Orange County, California, in December 1979, who appeared to have died from opiate overdose but tested negative for any known drugs of this type. Over the next year, there were 13 more deaths, and eventually the responsible agent was identified as α-methylfentanyl.

==== Stimulants ====
Stimulants are drugs that speed or give a mental boost to the consumer.

===== Cocaine =====
Black cocaine, and cocaine paste, are impure forms of cocaine.

The most common cocaine adulterants found in 1998 in samples in Rome, Italy were lidocaine and caffeine. Cocaine is sometimes mixed with methylamphetamine, methylphenidate, and ephedrine, but is usually mixed with non psychoactive chemicals such as mannitol, inositol, pectin, glucose, lactose, saccharin, white rice flour, and maltodextrin. Other of agranulocytosis, including 2 deaths, according to an alert from the Substance Abuse and Mental Health Services Administration (SAMHSA).

The emergence of fentanyl-laced cocaine has led to an increase in cocaine overdose fatalities in New York City.

====== Levamisole ======
Levamisole is one of the most common cutting agents used to lace illicit cocaine, with studies showing that between 2009 and 2016, 50–70% of all cocaine specimens worldwide contained levamisole, reflecting similar high rates of contamination across North America and Europe. Before trafficking to the United States, the cocaine is frequently adulterated with levamisole. By October 2017, this figure had risen further, with the US Drug Enforcement Administration (DEA) reporting that 87% of seized and analyzed cocaine bricks in the United States contained levamisole, making it the most common adulterant in cocaine at that time.

Levamisole-adulterated cocaine is associated with cocaine/levamisole-associated autoimmune syndrome (CLAAS) and cocaine- and levamisole-induced vasculitis (CLIV). Reagent testing kits can be used to detect the presence of cocaine and levamisole.

===== Methamphetamine =====
MSM is sometimes used as a cutting agent for illicitly manufactured methamphetamine.

==== Psychedelics ====
===== Cannabis =====
Cannabis products that are laced are usually laced with synthetic cannabinoids:

- Counterfeit cannabis-liquid (c-liquid) for e-cigarettes: Synthetic cannabinoids are increasingly offered in e-cigarette form as "c-liquid".
- Counterfeit cannabis buds: Hemp buds (or low-potency cannabis buds) laced with synthetic cannabinoids.
- Counterfeit cannabis edible: The Florida Poison Information Center in Jacksonville warned parents in September 2020 that the number of people poisoned by fake marijuana edibles and candies has tripled.
- Counterfeit hash oil: Several school kids in Greater Manchester collapsed after vaping synthetic cannabinoids mis-sold as THC vape.
- Counterfeit hashish: In 2020 counterfeit hashish were found to contain 4F-MDMB-BINACA and 5F-MDMB-PINACA (5F-ADB).

Less common psychoactive substances used to adulterate cannabis:

- Erectile dysfunction drugs: In the Netherlands two chemical analogs of sildenafil (Viagra) were found in adulterated marijuana.
- Methamphetamine: psychiatrist Dr Bill MacEwan believes that drug dealers in British Columbia are intentionally lacing cannabis with methamphetamine to make it more addictive. He had some psychiatric patients that claimed they only smoked pot but their drug tests were positive for methamphetamine use.
- PCP: Rarely, cannabis (especially that of low quality) is laced with PCP, particularly in the United States. However, it is not always done surreptitiously. Dealers who do so often (but not always) advertise their wares as being "enhanced" with other substances, and charge more money than they would otherwise, even if they do not say exactly what the lacing agents are. Such concoctions are often called "fry", "wet", "illy", "sherm", "water-water", "dust(ed)", "super weed", "grecodine" or other names.

Weight cutting agents:

- Binding substances: Sometimes cannabis is adulterated with other binding substances including industrial glues such as neoprene, tar, ammonia, bitumen, petroleum-derived hydrocarbons, dog food or even human or animal excrement. to make it cheaper, thus being of poorer quality.
- Sand, sugar, brix fertilizers, hair spray, fertilizers, pesticides and fungicides.
- Microscopic glass beads: Cannabis buds was found to be contaminated with glass beads in 2007, known as gris weed.
- Lead: In 2008, 30 German teenagers were hospitalized after the marijuana which they smoked was found to have been contaminated with lead, which was added in order to increase its weight.
- Shoe polish: Hash has been cut with shoe polish.
- Vitamin E acetate: Although harmless when used orally, high levels of the substance cause vaping-associated pulmonary injury when inhaled.

===== Ecstasy =====
Black market ecstasy pills are frequently found to contain other drugs in place of or in addition to methylenedioxymethamphetamine (MDMA). Since the slang term "ecstasy" usually refers only to MDMA, any pill which contains other compounds may be considered adulterated. 3,4-Methylenedioxyamphetamine (MDA), methylenedioxyethamphetamine (MDEA), amphetamine, methylamphetamine, benzylpiperazine (BZP), trifluoromethylphenylpiperazine (TFMPP), caffeine, ephedrine, pseudoephedrine, and dextromethorphan (DXM) are all commonly found in pills being sold as ecstasy. Less common drugs in ecstasy include diphenhydramine, acetaminophen, 5-MeO-DiPT, 2C-B, procaine, and phencyclidine (PCP). Ecstasy pills sometimes contain dimethylamylamine to increase its stimulant effects. Ecstasy pills might also contain a low dose of 2C-I to potentiate its euphoric effects. Pharmaceutical pills are sometimes sold as ecstasy, as well as pills that contain no psychoactive chemicals at all. Ecstasy sometimes contains 10 mg to 20 mg of baclofen to reduce overheating caused by ecstasy. para-Methoxyamphetamine (PMA or "Dr. Death", a drug that causes so much overheating that it can kill within 40 minutes) is sometimes sold as ecstasy. There is one published case of an ecstasy tablet being adulterated with 8 mg of strychnine, a toxic alkaloid which was used in very low doses (less than 1 mg) as a stimulant and performance-enhancing drug in the past. Recently, several groups advocating for drug safety through education have made reagent testing products available to confirm what substances there are.

===== LSD =====
LSD is virtually never laced with other chemicals, but other lysergamides such as ALD-52 are sometimes sold as LSD-25. DOB, DOI, and other closely related drugs are sometimes sold as LSD. Several other highly potent hallucinogens such as Bromo-DragonFLY or 25I-NBOMe can be found in the form of blotters. LSD is also tasteless in normal dosages, so detection is only possible after ingestion or reagent testing. For these reasons, it is not uncommon to find blotters sold as LSD completely devoid of psychoactive substances.

=== Prescription medication ===
As the sources of prescription medication on the street are not verifiable through legitimate channels, misrepresentation of prescription medications is a common practice.

== Deaths ==
=== Case reports in commercial products ===
==== Alcohol ====
In June 2022, the Dutch Food and Consumer Product Safety Authority warned that the 3-liter champagne bottle from Moët & Chandon Ice Impérial contained MDMA, killing a person in Germany.

=== Polydrug intoxication deaths ===
A drug called Voodoo that has gained popularity among Egyptian youth, intoxicated seventy-one individuals, and killed two, in 2017. The drug samples contained synthetic cannabinoids, amphetamine, tramadol, methadone, MDA, benzodiazepines, morphine derivatives, and penitrem A (a neurotoxin).

== Testing ==
=== Reagent testing ===
Reagent testing kits are available online and also sold at some head shops. These kits claim to be able to identify common adulterants in ecstasy.

=== Professional lab tests ===
There are services available for testing the contents of an ecstasy pill that can tell the user what chemicals are contained in the pill and at what ratio. The results are then posted on their website along with every other pill that they have tested. The tests are considered to be highly accurate. Their services were at one time free, but when they ran out of funding they had to charge a fee for every pill tested.

== See also ==
- Darknet market
- Date rape drug
- Drug checking
- Isopropylbenzylamine
- Pill testing
- Surrogate alcohol
