= Cocaine and society =

The global cocaine trade operates in illicit and legal spheres, encompassing international trafficking networks and tightly-controlled commercial and pharmaceutical supply chains. The illicit market is a multi-billion-dollar enterprise driven by Andean coca cultivation and decentralized trafficking networks supplying consumer hubs. In response to widespread retail adulteration with agents such as levamisole, growing public health concerns, and risks including opioid contamination, policies increasingly emphasize harm-reduction strategies such as reagent testing kits and the distribution of reversal agents.

The legal supply chain involves strictly-regulated cultivation in countries such as Bolivia, Colombia, and Peru (where the state-run ENACO manages commercialization) with specialized industrial processing. In the United States, the Stepan Company imports and processes coca leaves to supply cocaine-free flavoring extract to The Coca-Cola Company and channels pharmaceutical-grade cocaine to Mallinckrodt for authorized medical uses such as local anesthesia.

Enforcement efforts, including coca eradication and border interdiction, have formed the backbone of the war on drugs. These strategies face ongoing criticism from experts and policymakers for causing environmental and socioeconomic damage while doing little to curb overall street availability or prices.

Leaders such as Colombian president Gustavo Petro and Amsterdam mayor Femke Halsema have advocated drug liberalization, saying that replacing prohibition with decriminalization and regulated markets is a more pragmatic and effective way to combat organized crime, reduce violence, and address public-health risks.

== Illicit market ==
The illicit market for cocaine encompasses a multi-billion-dollar global trade driven by Andean coca cultivation and decentralized, professional trafficking networks which supply consumer hubs in North America, Europe, and Oceania. Cocaine is one of the most widely-used illicit substances, characterized by widespread retail adulteration with agents such as levamisole and shifting consumption trends. Public-health and drug policies increasingly emphasize harm reduction strategies such as the distribution of reversal agents like naloxone for opioid contamination, reagent testing kits for drug-checking, and regulated safety resources.

=== Use and culture ===
Cocaine is sometimes known on the street as blow, coca, coke, bag, toot, crank, flake, snow, or soda cot. Slang terms for freebase cocaine include crack or rock.

Evidence of a link between cocaine use and violent behavior is limited; media bias and misconceptions in popular reporting may have contributed to this association, which is more likely explained by factors such as cocaine use disorder or personality disorders.

==== Prevalence ====
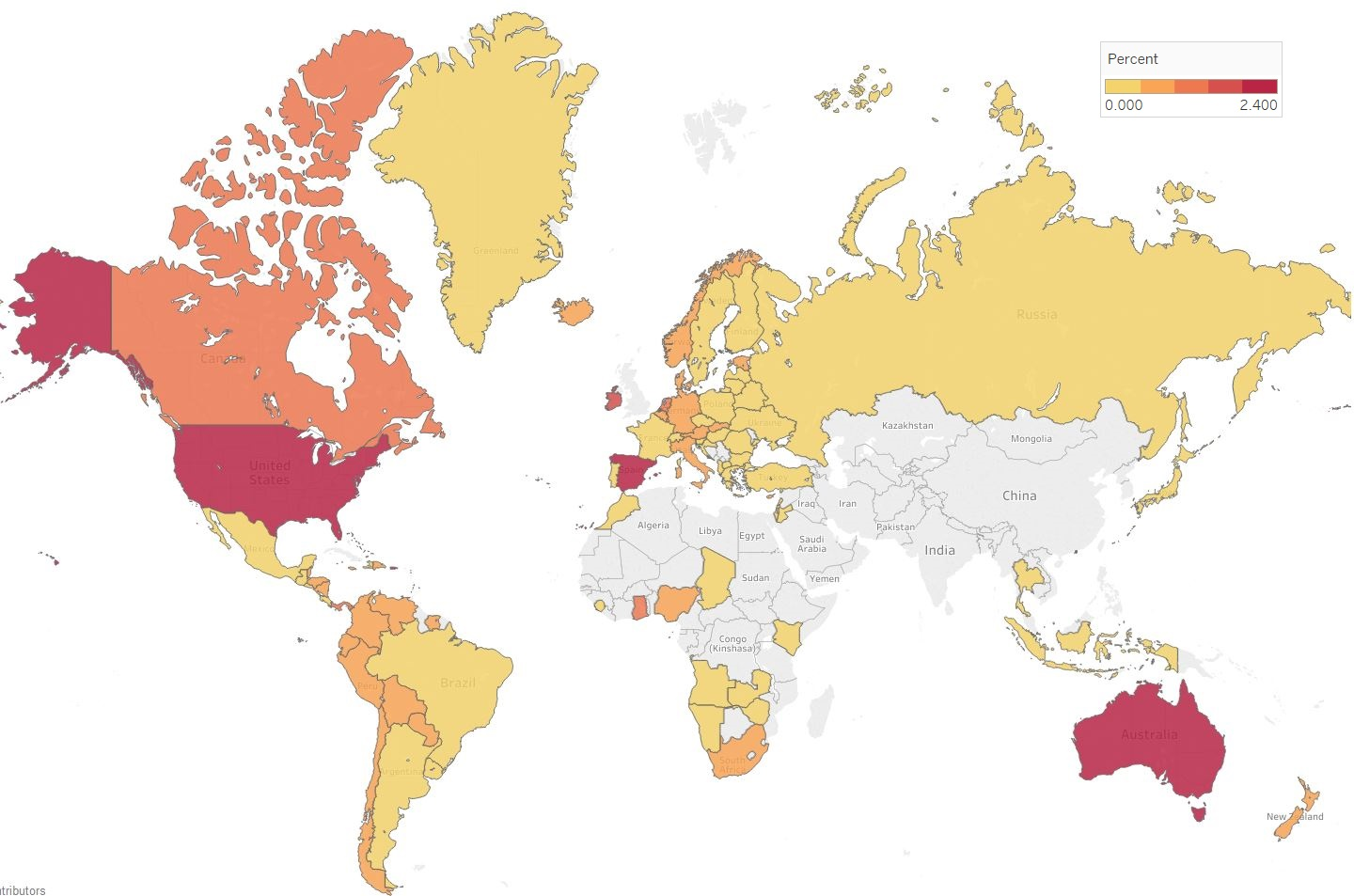
Countries by prevalence of cocaine use

World annual cocaine consumption was about 600 tonnes in 2000, with the United States consuming around 50 percent of the total and Europe about 25 percent. An estimated 1.5 million people in the United States used cocaine in 2010, down from 2.4 million in 2006. European cocaine use appeared to be increasing in 2012, with the greatest use in Spain, the United Kingdom, Italy, and Ireland. The 2010 UN World Drug Report concluded that "it appears that the North American cocaine market has declined in value from US$47 billion in 1998 to US$38 billion in 2008. Between 2006 and 2008, the value of the market remained basically stable".

Global estimates of drug users in 2016 (in millions of users)
Substance	Best estimate	Low estimate	High estimate
Amphetamine- type stimulants	34.16	13.42	55.24
Cannabis	192.15	165.76	234.06
Cocaine	18.20	13.87	22.85
Ecstasy	20.57	8.99	32.34
Opiates	19.38	13.80	26.15
Opioids	34.26	27.01	44.54

According to a 2016 United Nations report, England and Wales had the highest rate of cocaine usage (2.4 percent of adults in the previous year). Other countries whose use rate was 1.5 percent or more were Spain and Scotland (2.2 percent), the United States (2.1 percent), Australia (2.1 percent), Uruguay (1.8 percent), Brazil (1.75 percent), Chile (1.73 percent), the Netherlands (1.5 percent) and Ireland (1.5 percent).

===== Australia =====
Cocaine is the second-most-popular illegal recreational drug in Australia (behind cannabis). Overall use has been on the rise since the mid-1990s, but rates and attitudes vary by state.

===== Europe =====
Cocaine use in the general population is highest (from 4.2 to 5.5 percent) in Denmark, Norway, Ireland, and the Netherlands, in that order.

===== South America =====
South America is the world's third-largest market for cocaine, with approximately 1,981,000 users in 2004–2005. Use by people aged 15–64 was 0.7 percent, on a par with Europe but lower than North America's 2.3 percent. Use rates in the main coca-producing countries are at or above the regional average, indicating a connection between illicit crop cultivation, cocaine production, and local abuse. In Bolivia (where use is well above the Latin American average), annual rates have mirrored domestic production trends. After increasing from 1990 to 1996, rates declined; they rose again from 2000 to 2005, reaching 1.6 percent for cocaine hydrochloride and 1.9 percent for cocaine base in 2005.

===== United States =====
Cocaine is the second-most-popular illegal recreational drug in the United States (behind cannabis), and the U.S. is the world's largest consumer of cocaine. Its users span a variety of ages, races, and professions. The drug became particularly popular during the 1970s and 1980s in discos such as Studio 54.

==== Use in sports ====
Cocaine is prohibited for use in competition by the World Anti-Doping Agency (WADA), which classifies it as an S6 stimulant and a "substance of abuse" on its International Standard Prohibited List. Athletes who test positive for cocaine in competition may face disciplinary measures, although special consideration may be given if use occurred out of competition and was unrelated to performance.

==== Harm reduction ====
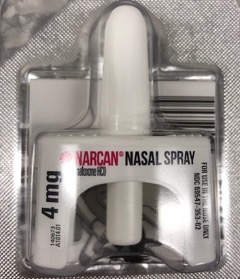
Narcan (naloxone) nasal spray

Experts recommend that anyone using stimulants such as cocaine or MDMA, and those around them, carry naloxone due to the growing risk of opioid contamination of the drug supply. Having naloxone available can help prevent fatal overdoses, even when opioids are not intentionally used. Nasal-spray formulations of naloxone are recommended because they are legal in many regions, easy to carry, and can be administered by anyone. The World Health Organization (WHO) includes naloxone on their List of Essential Medicines, and recommends its use for reversing opioid overdoses. In the United States, nasal naloxone is available without a prescription.

Harm reduction for cocaine use focuses on health risks associated with cocaine injection and smoking crack cocaine. It includes providing clean needles and crack-cocaine paraphernalia, promoting safer consumption practices, and offering drug-checking services to detect dangerous contaminants such as fentanyl. These strategies aim to minimize overdose risk and disease transmission, supporting user health and access to treatment.

===== Reagent testing =====
Reagent testing kits are widely used to identify the presence of cocaine and its common adulterants. The Scott reagent is designed as a test for cocaine. The Morris reagent, derived from the Scott reagent, is also used to test for cocaine. The Liebermann and Mandelin reagents are commonly used to test for cocaine and levamisole, a cutting agent frequently found in street cocaine.

Each reagent provides different color indications for various substances. Since adulteration of cocaine with levamisole is widespread, the color reactions produced by these reagents often reflect the presence of both substances. The resulting mixed color can complicate interpretation, making further analysis or additional testing necessary to clarify the sample's composition.

DanceSafe recommends starting with the Morris reagent to identify cocaine; a bright-blue color indicates the presence of cocaine. No color change or light pink is normal with the Marquis reagent; orange may indicate amphetamines, and a test strip may be needed. With the Liebermann reagent on a fresh sample, yellow means pure cocaine; rusty red suggests levamisole or lidocaine.

=== Illicit supply chain ===
According to a 2006 United Nations Office on Drugs and Crime report, 99 percent of global illicit cocaine was sourced from coca plantations in the Andes – primarily in Colombia, Peru, and Bolivia. While most coca cultivation is concentrated in South America, it is expanding into the Central American countries of Honduras, Guatemala, and Belize.

The global cocaine trade operates through an illicit supply chain shaped by geography and economics. Production begins in Latin America, where coca plants are cultivated and processed through several chemical stages: first into a crude extract known as cocaine paste, then into coca base, and finally refined into cocaine hydrochloride. Cocaine is occasionally adulterated with levamisole before shipment, increasing bulk and maximizing profits for traffickers. The drug is then trafficked, often across international borders, with a variety of smuggling routes and methods.

Although most cocaine paste and base are further processed in the source countries, some traffickers smuggle cocaine hydrochloride or cocaine paste by chemically concealing it in materials (such as plastics and liquids) which make detection difficult; one example is black cocaine. When the cocaine reaches its destination hub, it is transported to laboratories for extraction and refinement into cocaine hydrochloride or converted if the shipment arrives as cocaine paste. Several such facilities are detected in Europe each year.

After reaching the destination hub and being refined (if needed), cocaine hydrochloride is typically distributed in bulk to wholesale markets in consumer countries. After reaching these markets, it is broken down into smaller quantities for local markets. Cocaine is frequently adulterated, most commonly with the toxic stimulant levamisole, to increase profits; counterfeit cocaine, substances sold as cocaine but containing little or no actual cocaine, is also sometimes distributed.

==== Organization ====
The cocaine trade has been dominated since the 1980s by centralized, hierarchical drug cartels such as Medellín and Cali, their successors, and early FARC factions. This model fragmented into a diverse network of global trafficking links by the early 2000s, allowing South American cocaine production to supply markets in Europe, Africa, Asia, and Oceania through a number of routes. According to the 2025 World Drug Report, violence linked to the cocaine trade continues to affect Latin America and the Caribbean and is expanding into Western Europe, Asia, and Africa as transnational organized crime groups compete globally.

Research in 2025 indicates that the global cocaine trade is shifting from violent, hierarchical cartels to professional, decentralized networks focused on logistics and cross-border collaboration. Violence is used more strategically and locally, rather than as the primary means of control.

==== Production ====
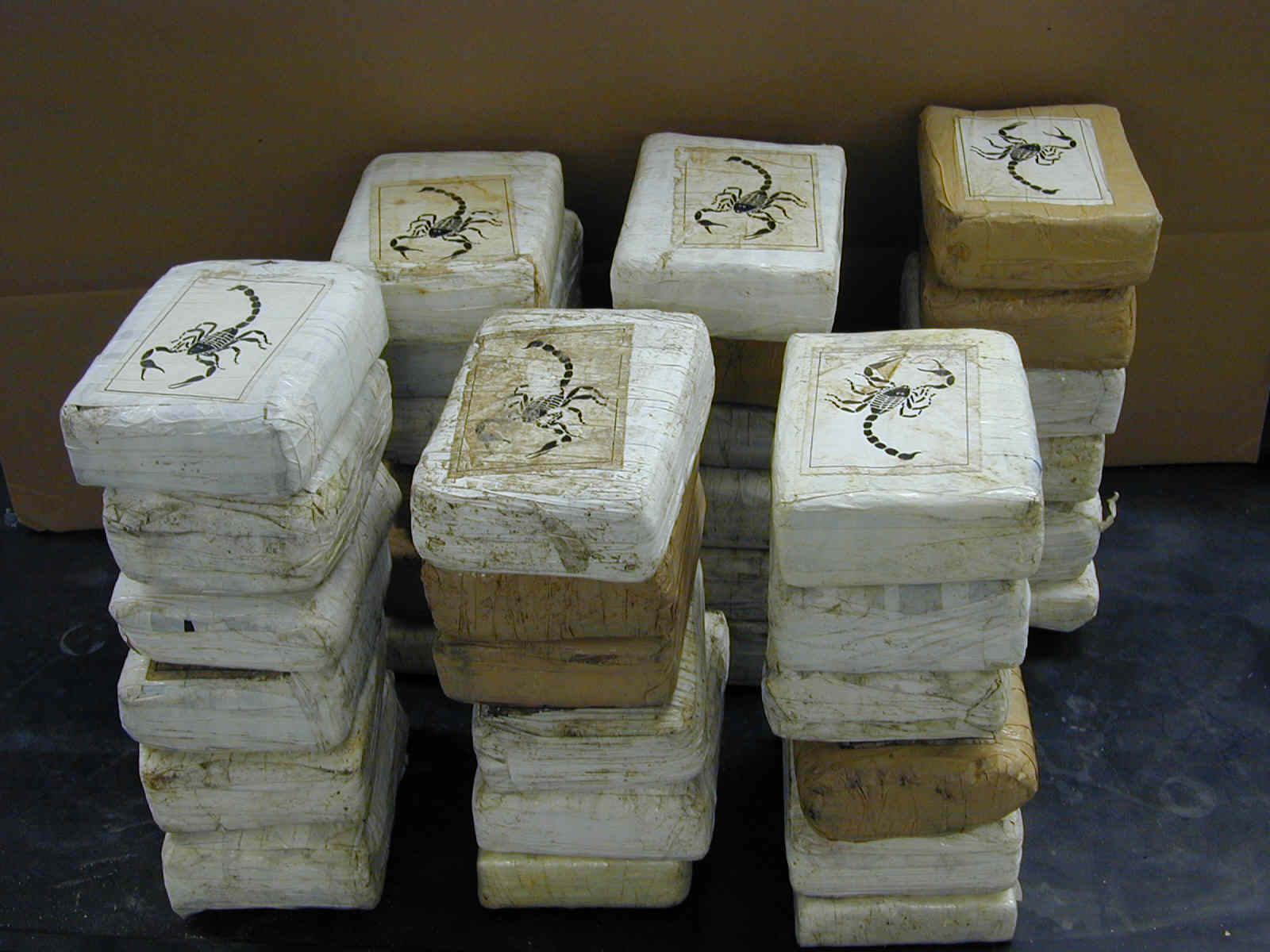
Cocaine powder is placed in molds and compressed, often with hydraulic presses, into dense, solid bricks which are sometimes brand-identified.

Colombia was the world's largest cocaine producer in 2019, with production more than tripling since 2013. Three-quarters of the world's annual yield of cocaine has been produced in Colombia from cocaine base imported from Peru (primarily the Huallaga Valley) and Bolivia and from locally-grown coca. There was a 28-percent increase in the number of potentially-harvestable 2019 coca plants in Colombia over 1998. This, combined with crop reductions in Bolivia and Peru, made Colombia the nation with the largest area of coca under cultivation after the mid-1990s. Coca grown for traditional purposes by indigenous communities, permitted by Colombian law, is a small fragment of total coca production; most is used for the illegal drug trade.

Estimated Andean region coca cultivation and potential pure cocaine production
	2000	2001	2002	2003	2004
Net cultivation km^{2} (sq mi)	1,875 (724)	2,218 (856)	2,007.5 (775.1)	1,663 (642)	1,662 (642)
Potential pure cocaine production (tonnes)	770	925	830	680	645

The latest estimate by U.S. authorities of the annual production of cocaine in Colombia is 290 metric tons. According to U.S. Department of State estimates, a total of 351.8 metric tons of Colombian cocaine (121.3 percent of Colombia's annual production) had been seized by the end of 2011.

===== Processing =====
In 1991, the United States Department of Justice released a report detailing the typical process in which leaves from coca plants were converted into cocaine hydrochloride by Latin American drug cartels. The species of coca planted was determined by location, with Erythroxylum coca grown in the tropical high-altitude climates of the eastern Andes (Peru and Bolivia) and Erythroxylum novogranatense favoured in the drier lowland areas of Colombia. The average cocaine alkaloid content of a sample of coca leaf varied between 0.1 and 0.8 percent, with coca from higher altitudes containing the largest percentages of cocaine alkaloids. A farmer will generally plant coca on a sloping hill, so rainfall will not drown the plants as they reach full maturity (12 to 24 months after planting). The main harvest of coca leaves is after the wet season in March, with additional harvesting in July and November. The leaves are brought to a flat area and spread out on tarpaulins to dry in the sun for about six hours, and then placed in 25 lb (11 kg) sacks for transport to market or a cocaine-processing facility. Peru and Bolivia were the main locations for converting coca leaf to coca paste and cocaine base during the early 1990s, and Colombia was the primary location for the conversion of these products into cocaine hydrochloride.

Coca leaf is typically converted to coca paste near the coca fields to minimize the need for transport, with a plastic-lined pit serving as a pozo (well). Leaves are added to the pozo with fresh water from a nearby river, kerosene and sodium carbonate. A several-person team stomps on the mixture in their bare feet to help turn the leaves into paste. The cocaine alkaloids and kerosene separate from the water and coca leaves, which are drained off (or scooped out of) the mixture. The cocaine alkaloids are extracted from the kerosene and added to a dilute acidic solution to which sodium carbonate is added to form a precipitate. The acid and water are drained off and the precipitate is filtered and dried to produce off-white, putty-like coca paste for transport to a cocaine-base processing facility. At the facility, the coca paste is dissolved in a mixture of sulfuric acid and water. Potassium permanganate is added, and the solution stands for six hours to allow unwanted alkaloids to break down. The solution is filtered, and the precipitate discarded. Ammonia water is added, and another precipitate forms. When the solution finishes reacting, the liquid is drained. The remaining precipitate is dried under heating lamps, and the resulting cocaine-base powder is ready for transfer to a cocaine hydrochloride laboratory. At the laboratory, acetone is added to the cocaine base; after it has dissolved, the solution is filtered to remove undesired material. Hydrochloric acid diluted in ether is added to the solution, which causes the cocaine to precipitate out of the solution as cocaine hydrochloride crystals. The crystals are dried under lamps or in microwave ovens before being pressed into 1 kg (2.2 lb) blocks and wrapped in plastic for export.

===== Illegal cultivation =====
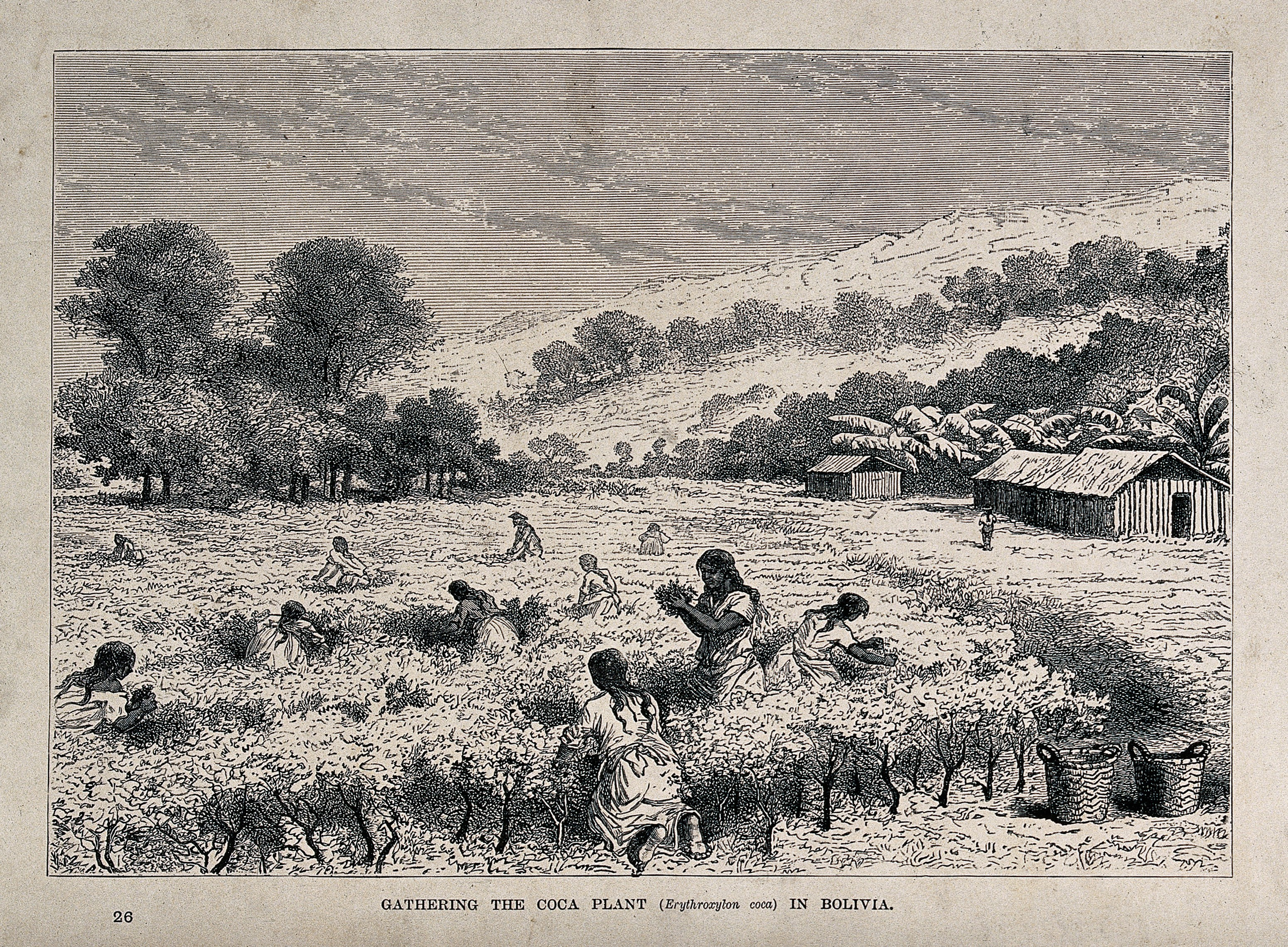
Women gathering leaves of the coca plant (Erythroxylum coca) in Bolivia (wood engraving, c. 1867)

The cultivation of coca attracts many growers due to several factors, including the lack of other employment alternatives, the lower profitability of alternative crops in official crop-substitution programs, eradication-related damage to non-drug farmland, and the spread of new strains of coca due to persistent demand. Coca eradication with defoliants has devastated parts of the farming economy in some coca-growing regions of Colombia, and strains have apparently been developed which are resistant (or immune) to them. Whether these strains are natural mutations or the product of human tampering is unclear. The strains have been shown to be more potent than older ones, increasing profits for the drug cartels which export cocaine. Although production fell temporarily, coca rebounded in smaller Colombian fields instead of larger plantations.

====== South America ======
Coca is traditionally cultivated in the lower altitudes of the eastern slopes of the Andes (the Yungas), or the highlands, depending on the species grown. Coca production begins in the valleys and upper jungle regions of the Andean region, where the countries of Colombia, Peru, and Bolivia are host to more than 98 percent of the global land area planted with coca.

====== Central America ======
Coca plantations were discovered in Mexico in 2014 and in Honduras in 2020. Since then, coca production in Central America has increased. In 2022, authorities destroyed over 6.5 million coca plants in Honduras, four million in Guatemala, and more than half a million in southern Belize. By 2024, the number of coca plantations found and eradicated in Honduras had nearly doubled from the previous year and a record number of processing labs were dismantled across the region. Unlike the Andes (where small farmers typically grow coca), Central American cultivation is controlled by organized-crime groups backed by foreign cartels. A 2024 study found that coca-cultivation suitability increased most in northern Central America, particularly in Honduras, Guatemala, and El Salvador (known as the Northern Triangle of Central America), and Belize. The study also reported that 47 percent of northern Central America (Honduras, Guatemala, and Belize) has biophysical characteristics suitable for coca growing, suggesting that environmental factors are unlikely to limit the crop's spread in those countries. The latitudes and altitude gradients of these countries are analogous to the altitude diversity of Colombia's coca-cultivation zones, although their soils are near the upper limit of what is considered suitable for coca in Colombia.

===== Cocaine paste =====
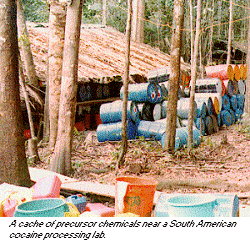

In traditional cocaine production, solvents are key precursor chemicals used to extract and process cocaine from coca leaves. The process typically involves kerosene (to extract the cocaine alkaloid from the alkaline mixture of coca leaves and water) and acetone, diethyl ether, ethyl acetate, and chloroform, used in later purification to dissolve (or precipitate) cocaine base or hydrochloride.

Cocaine paste (paco, basuco, oxi, or pasta) is a crude extract of the coca leaf which contains 40 to 91 percent cocaine freebase, companion coca alkaloids, and varying quantities of benzoic acid, methanol, and kerosene. In South America, coca paste (also known as cocaine base, and often confused with cocaine sulfate in North America) is relatively inexpensive and widely used by the working class. Smoked in tobacco or cannabis cigarettes, it has become widespread in several Latin American countries. Coca paste has been relatively abundant in South American countries such as Colombia, where it is processed into cocaine hydrochloride ("street cocaine") for global distribution. The caustic reaction associated with the local application of coca paste prevents its use by oral, intranasal, mucosal, or injection routes, and it can only be smoked when combined with a combustible material such as tobacco or cannabis.

A 2003 interview with a coca farmer illustrated a mode of production by acid–base extraction which has changed little since 1905. About 625 pounds (283 kg) of leaves were harvested per hectare, six times a year. The leaves were dried for half a day, then chopped into small pieces with a string trimmer and sprinkled with a small amount of powdered cement (replacing sodium carbonate). Several hundred pounds of this mixture were soaked in 50 US gallons (190 L) of gasoline for a day; the gasoline was then removed and the leaves pressed for the remaining liquid and discarded. One bucket of battery acid (weak sulfuric acid) per 55 lb (25 kg) of leaves created a phase separation, in which the cocaine free base in the gasoline was acidified and extracted into several buckets of "murky-looking smelly liquid". After powdered caustic soda was added to this, the cocaine precipitated and could be removed by filtration through a cloth. The resulting material, when dried, was termed pasta and sold by the farmer. The 3,750 pounds (1,700 kg) yearly harvest of leaves from a hectare produced 6 lb (2.5 kg) of pasta, 40- to 60-percent cocaine. Repeated recrystallization with solvents, producing pasta lavada and (eventually) crystalline cocaine, was performed at specialized laboratories after the sale.

==== Trafficking ====
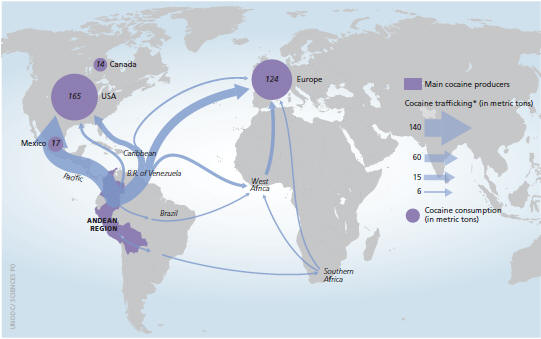
A map illustrating how cocaine travels from producer to consumer

Organized criminal gangs, operating on a large scale, dominate the cocaine trade. Most cocaine is grown and processed in South America (particularly in Colombia, Bolivia, and Peru) and smuggled into the United States and Europe. The U.S. is the world's largest consumer of cocaine, and it is sold at a steep markup by the gram or eighth of an ounce (3.5 grams, known as an "eight ball").

===== Smuggling methods =====
====== Concealment ======
Drug traffickers hide drugs in containers, disguising them as sugar or flour, mixing them with soya, or concealing them within a container; this makes detection more difficult for authorities. Cocaine is frequently smuggled in shipping containers or concealed in hidden compartments of vehicles and other objects. It is often concealed in a variety of everyday items and commercial goods. Smugglers have hidden cocaine in chocolate candies and other sweets, sometimes disguising the drug to look like ordinary candy bars or lollipops (which is dangerous if accidentally consumed by children). Traffickers use machinery and equipment such as cotton-candy machines, construction equipment, and heavy-machinery parts to hide cocaine, sometimes impregnating the drug into materials like rubber or plastic components. Black cocaine (Spanish: coca negra) is a form of cocaine which is mixed with other substances to disguise its appearance, interfere with color-based drug tests, and evade detection by drug-sniffing dogs. Additives may include pigments like charcoal, chemicals such as thiocyanates and iron or cobalt salts, and activated carbon to mask odors.

A business can hide mass shipments. Drug lord Joaquin (El Chapo) Guzman has mixed legitimate business with drug activities. He opened a cannery in Mexico and began producing canned jalapeños and peppers, stuffed with cocaine.

In August 2016, 370 kg of cocaine (worth about €50 million) was found hidden in a shipment of orange-juice concentrate at a Coca-Cola plant in Signes, France. The drugs arrived in a container from South America. Authorities ruled out any involvement by Coca-Cola employees, and began an investigation of the cocaine's origin. Polish authorities seized 44 liters of liquid cocaine, valued at about 7.5 million złoty ($1.85 million), which was hidden in cartons of wine in 2024.

At Miami International Airport in 1993, authorities discovered that some of the 312 boa constrictors in a shipment from Colombia had been surgically filled with condoms containing a total of 80 pounds (36 kg) of cocaine. All the snakes died.

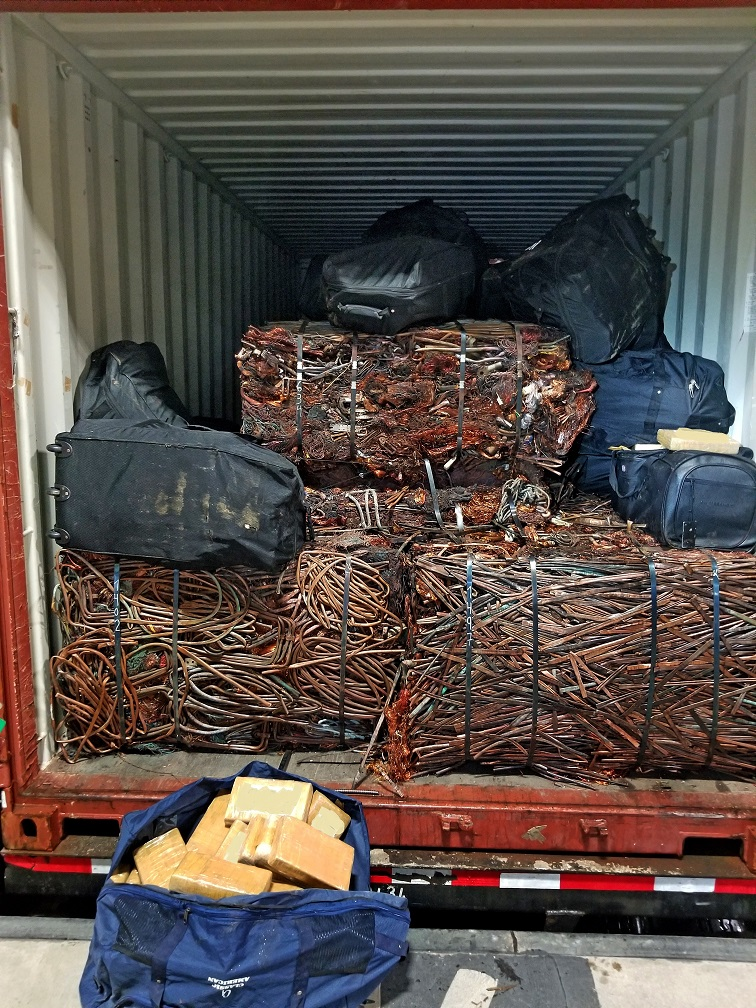
A 2,133-pound seizure of cocaine from a shipping container

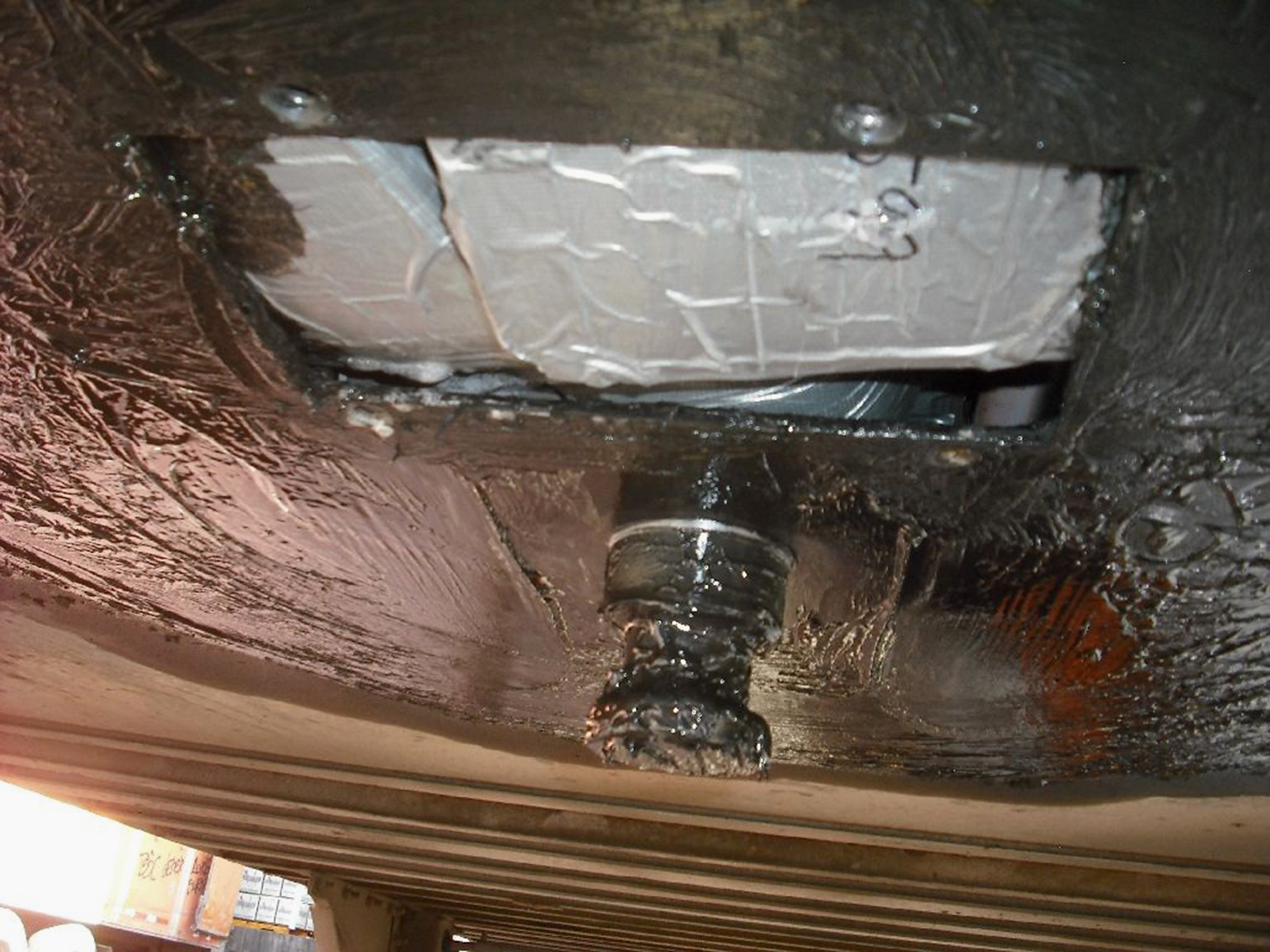
CBP seized 77 packages of cocaine and 34 packages of methamphetamine from a hidden compartment in a cargo-truck floor.

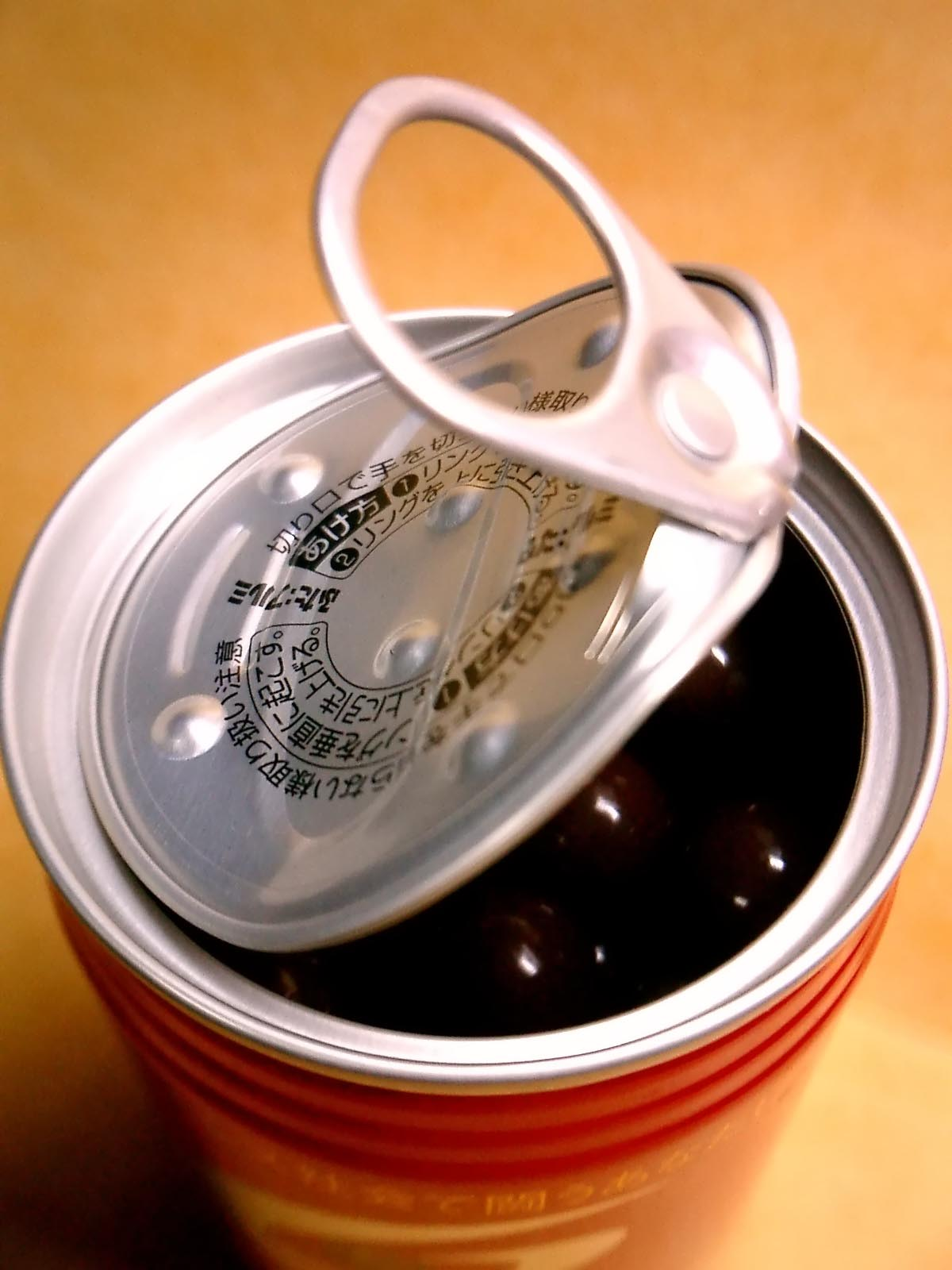
Vacuum-sealed food cans have been used for smuggling.

====== Mules ======
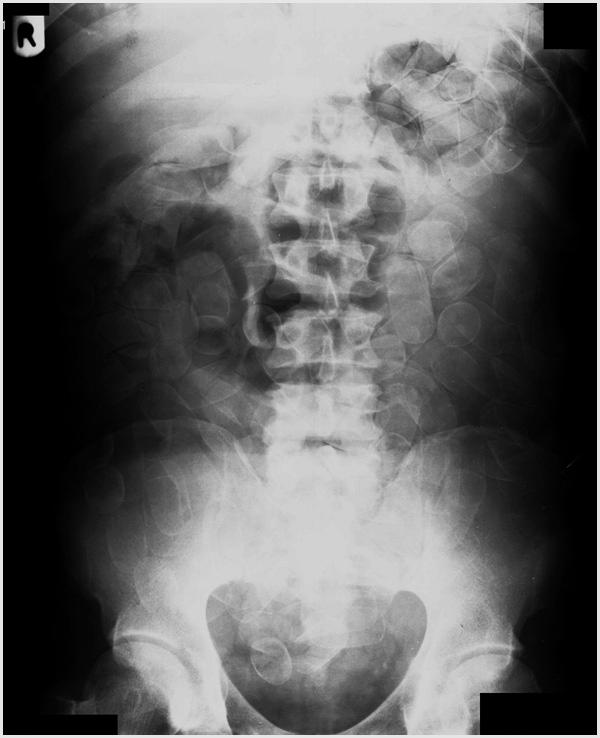
Abdominal X-ray showing swallowed packages of cocaine

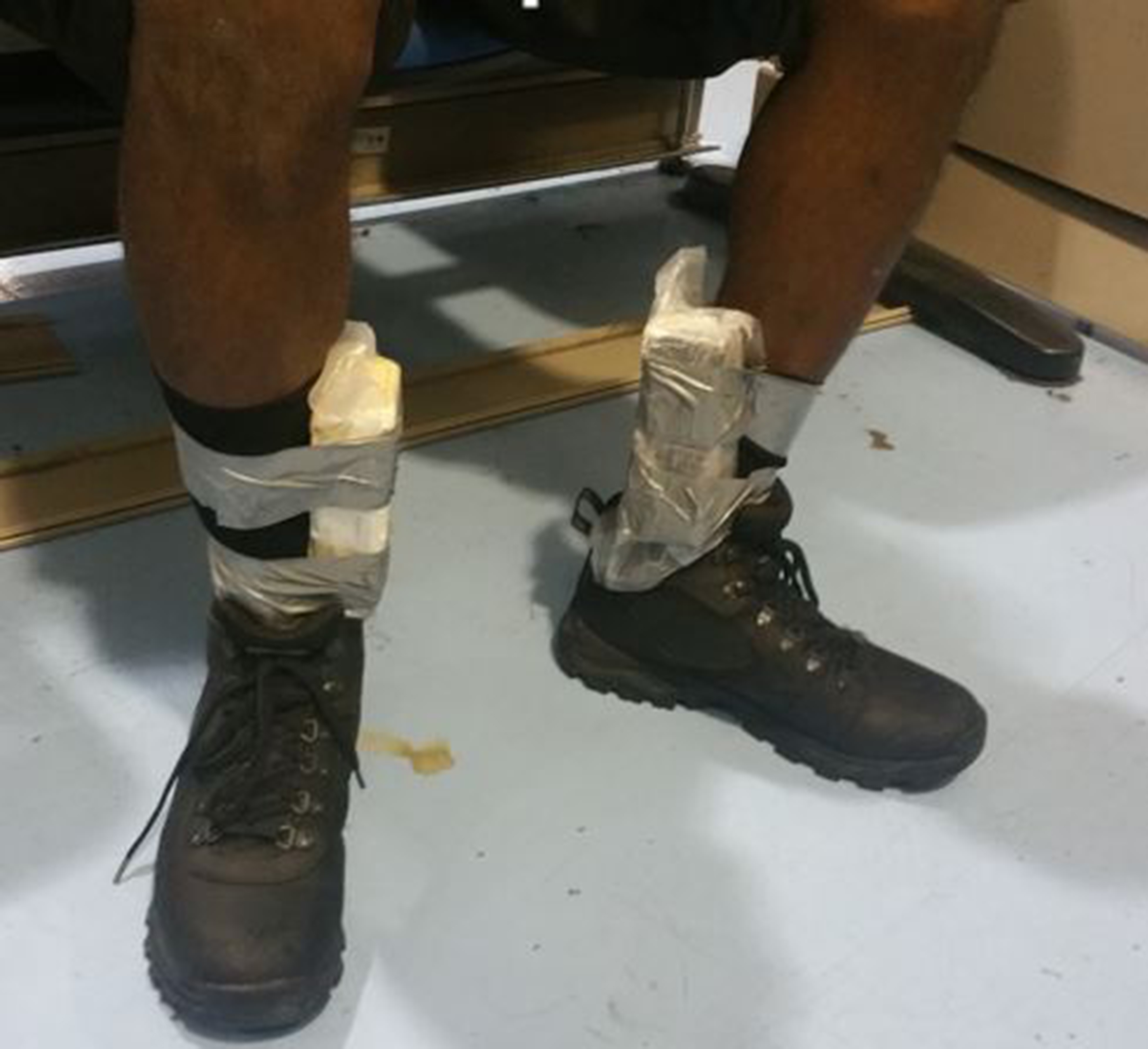
A man arrested with cocaine wrapped around his ankles

Mochileros (lit. 'backpackers') are drug couriers in the Latin American drug trade. They move drugs on foot from areas where it is produced, such as cocaine from the Valle de los Ríos Apurímac, Ene y Mantaro in Peru, to pick-up points for collection by the next link in the transport chain. The work is very hazardous.

In Mexico, those who engage in this type of activity are known as "burreros" (a donkey, a pack animal) and cross the Mexico-U.S. border through the Sonoran Desert into Arizona. They usually travel in small groups, and the journey takes more than a week. Each person carries a square-shaped package on their back, holding about 55 pounds of illegal substances.

Cocaine is also carried internationally in small, concealed, kilogram quantities by couriers known as "mules" (or "mulas"), who cross a border legally (through a port) or (illegally) elsewhere. If the mule gets through without being caught, the gangs will receive most of the profits. If the mule is caught, gangs may sever all links and the mule will usually stand trial for individual trafficking. Mules are often forced into their role by coercion, violence, threats or extreme poverty.

General smuggling techniques which also have been used for cocaine include:

- Concealment: Methods of smuggling include hiding the goods in secret compartments of a large vehicle luggage, or in clothing.
- Body packing: Transporting goods outside (or inside) the body by a person known as "bait". Contraband is attached to the outside of the body with adhesive tape, glue or straps, often between the cheeks of the buttocks or between rolls of fat.
- Swallowing: Using a mule's gastrointestinal tract or other body cavities as containers, this has sometimes resulted in cardiac arrest.

====== Maritime smuggling ======
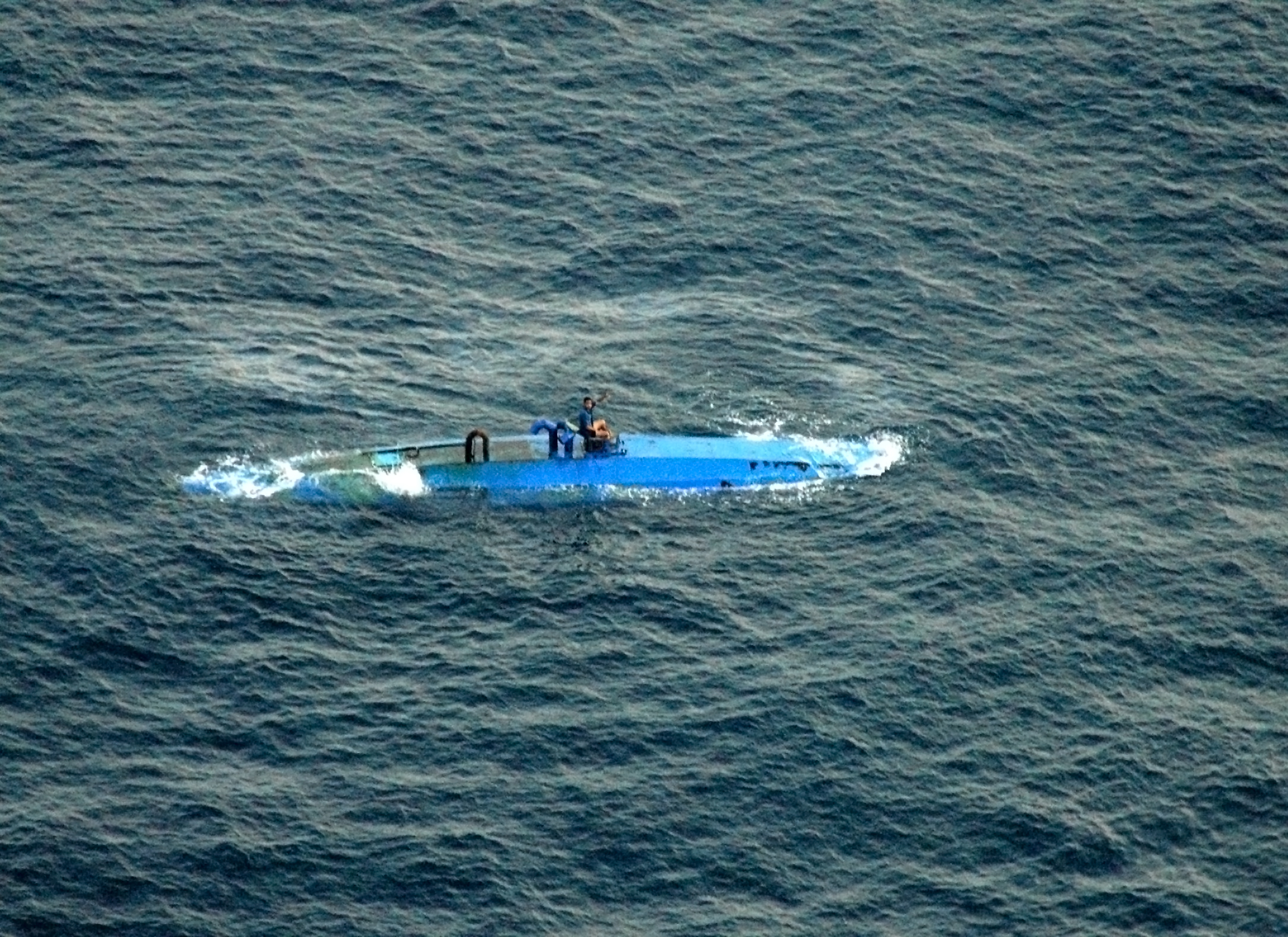
A semi-submersible boat, used for drug smuggling

Cargo ships are used to smuggle cocaine to staging sites in the Western Caribbean–Gulf of Mexico area. These vessels are typically 150– to 250-foot (50–80 m) coastal freighters that carry an average cocaine load of approximately 2.5 tonnes. Commercial fishing vessels are also used for smuggling. In areas with a high volume of recreational traffic, smugglers use the same types of vessels (such as go-fast boats) as those used by the local population.

CNN reported on 20 March 2008 that drug subs were the latest tool used by drug runners to bring cocaine north from Colombia. Although the vessels were once viewed as a sideshow of the drug war, those charged with catching them said that they are becoming faster, more seaworthy, and capable of carrying bigger loads of drugs than earlier models

In 2022, Spanish police seized three unmanned underwater vehicles used to smuggle drugs across the Strait of Gibraltar from Morocco in the first known interception of the devices. The drones, each carrying up to 200 kg of narcotics, were linked to French cartels. The operation led to eight arrests and exposed a gang using advanced drones and modified vehicles for trafficking across Europe.

In 2025, international drug cartels began using whale-shaped mini-submarines to smuggle cocaine into Australia via Cyprus. The vessels are transported on cargo ships, dropped in international waters and retrieved by smaller boats to deliver drugs ashore, challenging law-enforcement efforts.

===== Bribery =====
Bribery can be part of a prearranged deal made before shipping or an offer if traffickers are caught during routine inspections. Bribery and corruption facilitate illicit trafficking of cocaine. Drug-trafficking organizations often rely on bribing government officials, law-enforcement agents, customs officers, and border-security personnel to evade detection and enable passage of cocaine shipments.

Bribery has enabled cocaine trafficking in the port of Hamburg, with officials and insiders accepting illicit payments to facilitate smuggling. This corruption exposes systemic vulnerabilities.

===== Intercontinental distribution =====
====== Source regions and routes ======
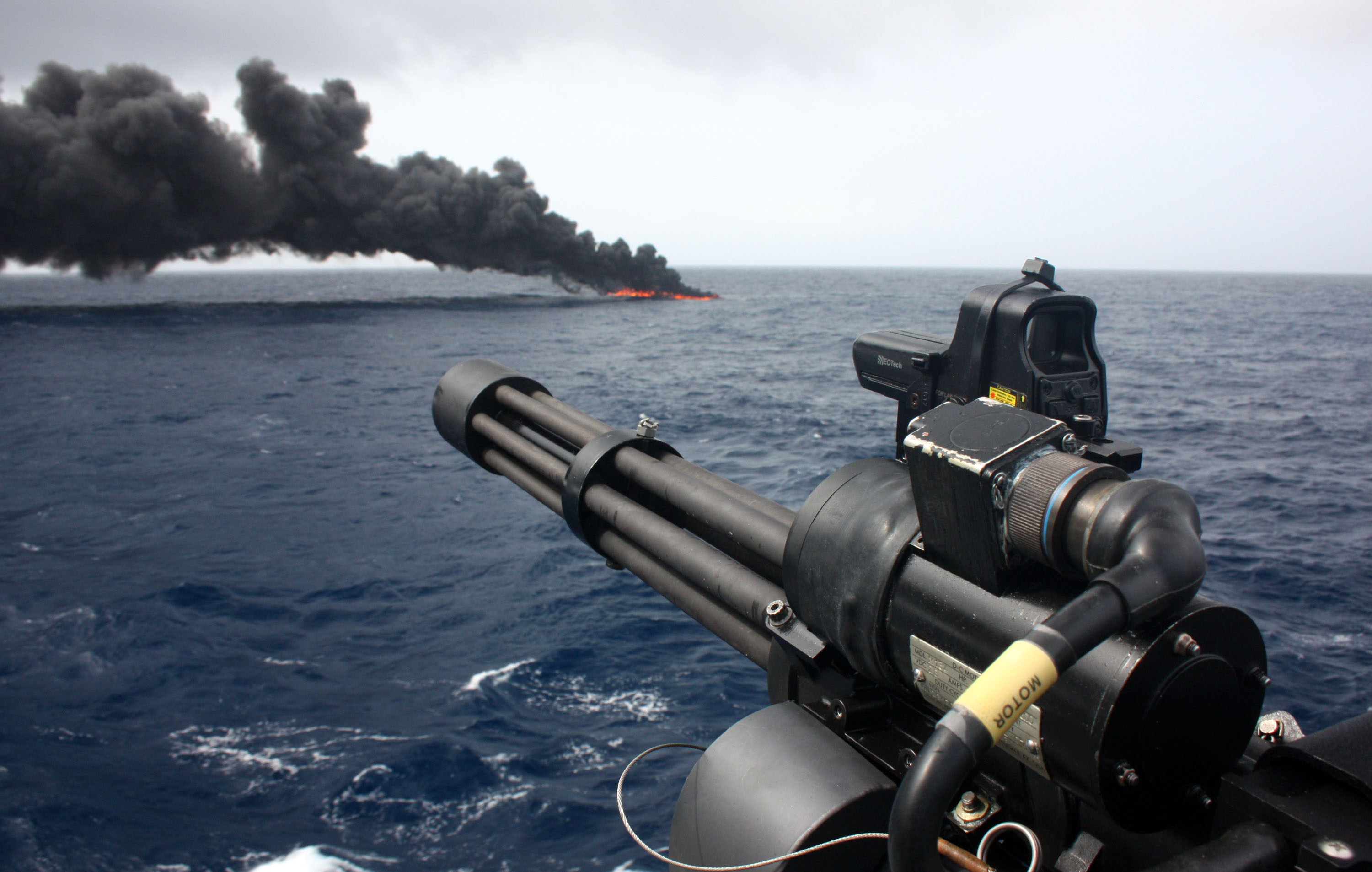
HMS Iron Duke seized £33 million of cocaine and destroyed a smuggling speedboat off the coast of South America in 2009. (Stuart Hill, MOD)

Cocaine trafficking is shifting to non-traditional South American ports in Argentina, Chile, and Uruguay due to weak controls and porous borders, in response to demand from the U.S. and Europe. Criminal groups prefer these routes for lower risk and higher profits. Authorities often overlook these ports, enabling traffickers to exploit them. Trafficking is expected to grow with new markets in Asia and Oceania.

Cocaine traffickers from Colombia and Mexico have established smuggling routes throughout the Caribbean, the Bahamas, and South Florida. They often hire traffickers from Mexico or the Dominican Republic to transport the drug to U.S. markets. Methods include airdrops of 500 to 700 kg (1,100 to 1,500 lb) in the Bahamas or off the coast of Puerto Rico, mid-ocean boat-to-boat transfers of 500 to 2,000 kg (1,100 to 4,400 lb), and commercial shipment of tonnes of cocaine through the port of Miami.

Another route goes through Chile, primarily used for cocaine produced in Bolivia since the nearest seaports are in northern Chile. The arid Bolivia–Chile border is easily crossed by 4×4 vehicles to the seaports of Iquique and Antofagasta. The price of cocaine is higher in Chile than in Peru and Bolivia, but the final destination is usually Europe (particularly Spain, with drug-dealing networks of South American immigrants.

The primary cocaine-importing points in the United States have been in Arizona, Southern California, South Florida, and Texas. Typically, land vehicles are driven across the Mexico–United States border. Sixty-five percent of U.S. cocaine entered the country through Mexico in 2006, after transport from South America. In 2015, the Sinaloa Cartel was the most active cartel smuggling and trafficking illicit drugs in the U.S.

====== European destination ======
Hamburg, Germany's largest port, has become a central hub for Europe's cocaine trade, with seizures such as 16 tonnes in 2021 exposing institutional corruption as drug networks infiltrate police, justice, and port infrastructure. A lead prosecutor was tried for allegedly leaking investigation details to traffickers in exchange for bribes; dockworkers and security staff have enabled smuggling, indicating that profits from cocaine are fueling violence, bribery, and systemic vulnerability in a country long considered among the least corrupt in the world.

===== Secondary extraction =====
Most cocaine paste and base are typically processed in Latin America, but they are occasionally trafficked to other continents (such as Europe) for refinement into cocaine hydrochloride and chemically embedded into materials like plastics to avoid detection. Traffickers use increasingly-sophisticated methods to smuggle cocaine, impregnating it into clothing, beeswax, plastics, herbs, charcoal, and liquids. Cocaine is also sometimes mixed with carbon, yielding black cocaine. These methods make detection by authorities more difficult. Extracting cocaine from these materials requires complex chemical processes in large, clandestine laboratories dedicated to secondary extraction. The labs are modeled on Colombian cocaine-production sites, with Dutch crime groups providing the resources and Colombian experts overseeing the extraction. Cocaine is processed in several EU member states, with a number of laboratories dismantled annually; six cocaine-processing labs were dismantled in Portugal in 2023 and 2024, resulting in the seizure of cocaine paste and cocaine hydrochloride.

===== Wholesale distribution =====
After large-scale trafficking, cocaine is distributed in countries or regions by mid-level networks operating across the United States and Europe. These distributors break down bulk shipments into smaller quantities, and supply local dealers. Distribution often involves organized groups which manage storage, transportation, and logistics to ensure that the drug reaches consumers. Wholesale prices for cocaine increase dramatically as the drug moves from South America to consumer markets, with the 2004 cost typically 15 times higher in the United States and 32 times higher in Europe than in South America.

===== Retail distribution =====
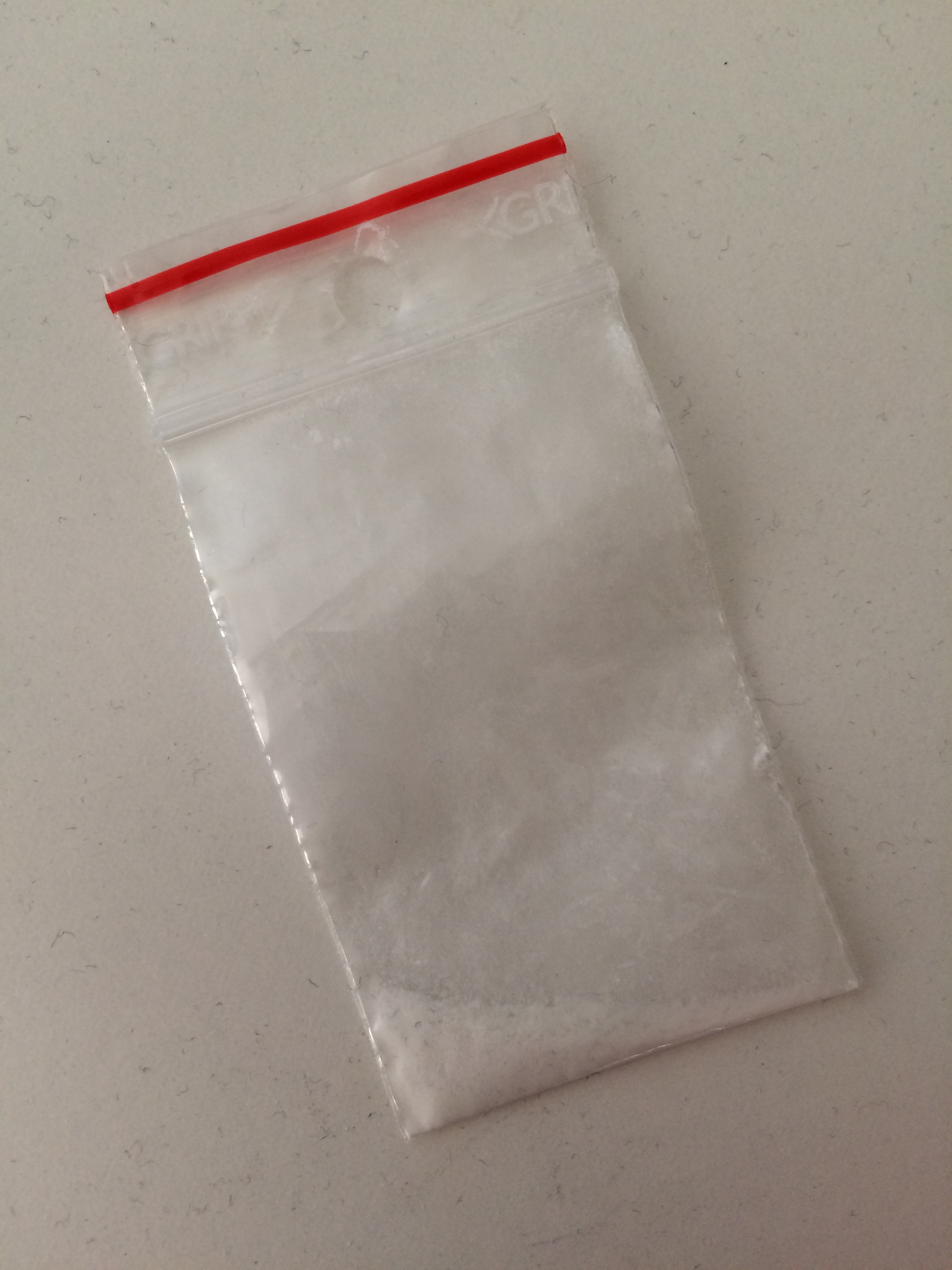
Cocaine in a zipper storage bag

Cocaine is readily available in all major metropolitan areas. According to the Summer 1998 Pulse Check published by the U.S. Office of National Drug Control Policy, cocaine use had stabilized across the country with a few increases reported in San Diego, Bridgeport, Miami, and Boston. Use was lower in the western United States, thought to be due to a switch to methamphetamine by some; methamphetamine is cheaper, three-and-a-half times more powerful, and its high lasts 12 to 24 hours. The 2010 purity- and inflation-adjusted retail price of cocaine was €191 per gram, according to UNODC, ARQ, and Europol data from 14 countries for which sufficient purity and price data were available.

Cocaine is also sold in "bill sizes"; $10 might purchase a "dime bag", a very small amount (0.1–0.15 g) of cocaine, in 2007. These amounts and prices are popular among young people because they are inexpensive and easily concealed on one's person. Quality and price can vary by supply and demand, and on geographic region. The European Monitoring Centre for Drugs and Drug Addiction reported that the typical retail 2008 price of cocaine varied from €50 and €75 per gram in most European countries, although Cyprus, Romania, Sweden, and Turkey reported higher values.

==== Lacing ====
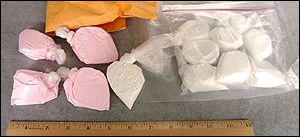
Cocaine is sometimes adulterated with fruit flavoring, reportedly to make the drug more appealing to younger users.

Street cocaine is often laced or "cut" with cheaper substances which include talc, lactose, sucrose, glucose, mannitol, inositol, caffeine, procaine, phencyclidine, phenytoin, lidocaine, strychnine, levamisole, fentanyl, and amphetamine. Caffeine (often added to street cocaine) increases its reinforcing and motivational effects, making the drug more compelling for users.

Cocaine is rarely prescribed for medical use, so nearly all recreational cocaine is sourced illegally. As it moves through a chain of traffickers (often a dozen or more), each looking to maximize profit, the drug is commonly mixed with adulterants which raise the risk of poisoning or overdose. For users, it is difficult to know what substances have been added to the cocaine they purchase. Purity tests or reagent kits may not detect all possible contaminants or dangerous additives, making it nearly impossible to guarantee the drug's safety or purity. The extent of cutting can vary, but drugs such as cocaine have ranged from 32 to 65 percent pure in Europe.

One problem with illegal cocaine use is the risk of ill effects caused by compounds used in adulteration. Cutting (or "stepping on") the drug is common, using compounds which simulate ingestion effects; Novocain (procaine) produces temporary anesthesia, which many users consider the result of strong or pure cocaine, ephedrine or similar stimulants. Normal adulterants are inactive sugars (usually mannitol, creatine, or glucose), so introducing active adulterants gives the illusion of purity; however, the cocaine's true purity is lowered. A 2007 study by the European Monitoring Centre for Drugs and Drug Addiction indicated that the purity level of street cocaine was often under five percent and, on average, under 50 percent.

===== Levamisole =====
In early 2003, South American cartels began adding levamisole to bulk cocaine before shipping it to the United States. Levamisole enhances cocaine's effects. In the body it is converted into aminorex, a toxic substance with amphetamine-like effects and a long duration of action. Cocaine acts as a serotonin–norepinephrine–dopamine reuptake inhibitor (SNDRI); aminorex is a serotonin–norepinephrine–dopamine releasing agent (SNDRA), which increases the levels of these neurotransmitters by promoting their release rather than inhibiting their reuptake.

Levamisole is on the World Health Organization's List of Essential Medicines as an intestinal anthelmintic, a class of antiparasitic drugs. It is one of the most common cutting agents in global illicit cocaine. Fifty to 70 percent of worldwide cocaine samples were contaminated with levamisole from 2009 to 2016, matching high rates in North America and Europe. Levamisole has increasingly been used globally as a cutting agent in cocaine, with the highest incidence in the United States; in 2008–2009, levamisole was found in 69 percent of cocaine samples seized by the Drug Enforcement Administration (DEA). In 2009, DEA findings showed that the average levamisole concentration in cocaine was approximately 10%. By April 2011, the DEA reported that the adulterant was found in 82 percent of seizures. The DEA reported that 87 percent of seized and analyzed cocaine bricks in the United States contained levamisole by October 2017, making it the most common adulterant in cocaine at that time.

===== Local anesthetics =====
Cocaine is sometimes cut with lidocaine and procaine.

===== Opioids =====
Fentanyl is increasingly found in cocaine samples. In February 2022, 24 people in Argentina died after using cocaine laced with the fentanyl analogue carfentanil. Nitazenes, a family of potent synthetic opioids, have also been detected.

==== Counterfeit cocaine ====
The 2014 Amsterdam drug deaths underscored the dangers of misidentified drugs when two tourists died after using heroin sold as cocaine. In 2022, Canberra's government-backed CanTEST drug-checking clinic found that 40 percent of substances brought in as "cocaine" contained no cocaine. The samples often consisted of benign fillers such as dimethyl sulfone, highlighting adulteration in the local cocaine market. The cocaine samples tested also had low purity, with none exceeding 27 percent.

== Legal supply chain ==
The legal supply chain encompasses the regulated cultivation, processing, and distribution of coca leaves and their derivatives for pharmaceutical applications, and commercial flavorings used by companies such as Coca-Cola.

=== Production ===
==== Cultivation ====
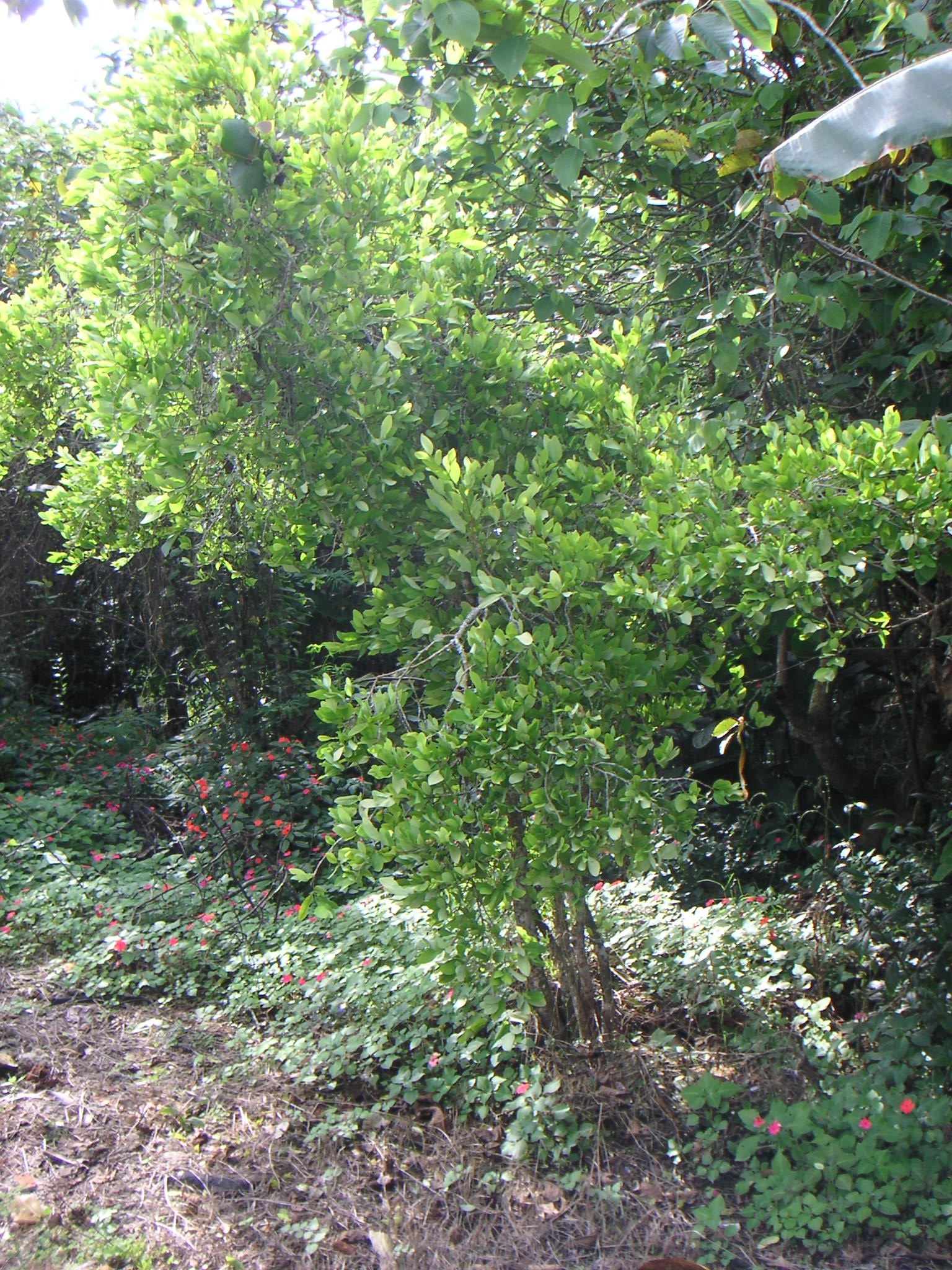
A coca plant

Legal coca cultivation in Bolivia is regulated by the Coca and Integral Development agency, which operates under the Ministry of Rural Development. Regulation of legal coca cultivation for traditional and scientific uses in Colombia is the responsibility of government agencies, primarily the Ministry of Justice and Law (Ministerio de Justicia y del Derecho). In Peru, The National Company of the Coca (Spanish: Empresa Nacional de la Coca, or ENACO) is a state company dedicated to the commercialization of the coca leaf and its derivatives. Created in 1949, it is the only state company with a monopoly on the commercialization and derivatives of the coca leaf. Although it became a state company in 1982, much of this cocaine enters the black market. In 2023, one estimate was 90%. The operation of the company is specified in Law 22095.

==== Stepan Company ====
The Stepan Company operates a facility in Maywood, New Jersey, which is the only commercial plant in the United States authorized by the Drug Enforcement Administration to import and process coca leaves primarily sourced from Peru via the National Coca Company. The company extracts cocaine from the leaves, producing a cocaine-free coca extract which is supplied to the Coca-Cola Company as a flavoring ingredient in its beverages. The separated pharmaceutical-grade cocaine is sold to Mallinckrodt, a pharmaceutical company, for use in medical applications such as local anesthesia.

=== Distribution ===
==== Mallinckrodt ====
Mallinckrodt has been the only company in the U.S. allowed to receive cocaine since 1988. The cocaine is sold as a prescription drug for use in hospitals as a local anesthetic by eye and ear, nose and throat (ENT) doctors.

== Enforcement ==
Coca eradication and interdiction are primary war-on-drugs strategies to curb cocaine. Promoted by the U.S. since 1961, eradication targets growing regions in countries such as Colombia and Peru and has been criticised for environmental and socioeconomic damage and disrupting indigenous traditions. Interdiction disrupts supply chains with multinational seizures, but intercepts only a fraction and has a minimal impact on street prices.

=== Coca eradication ===
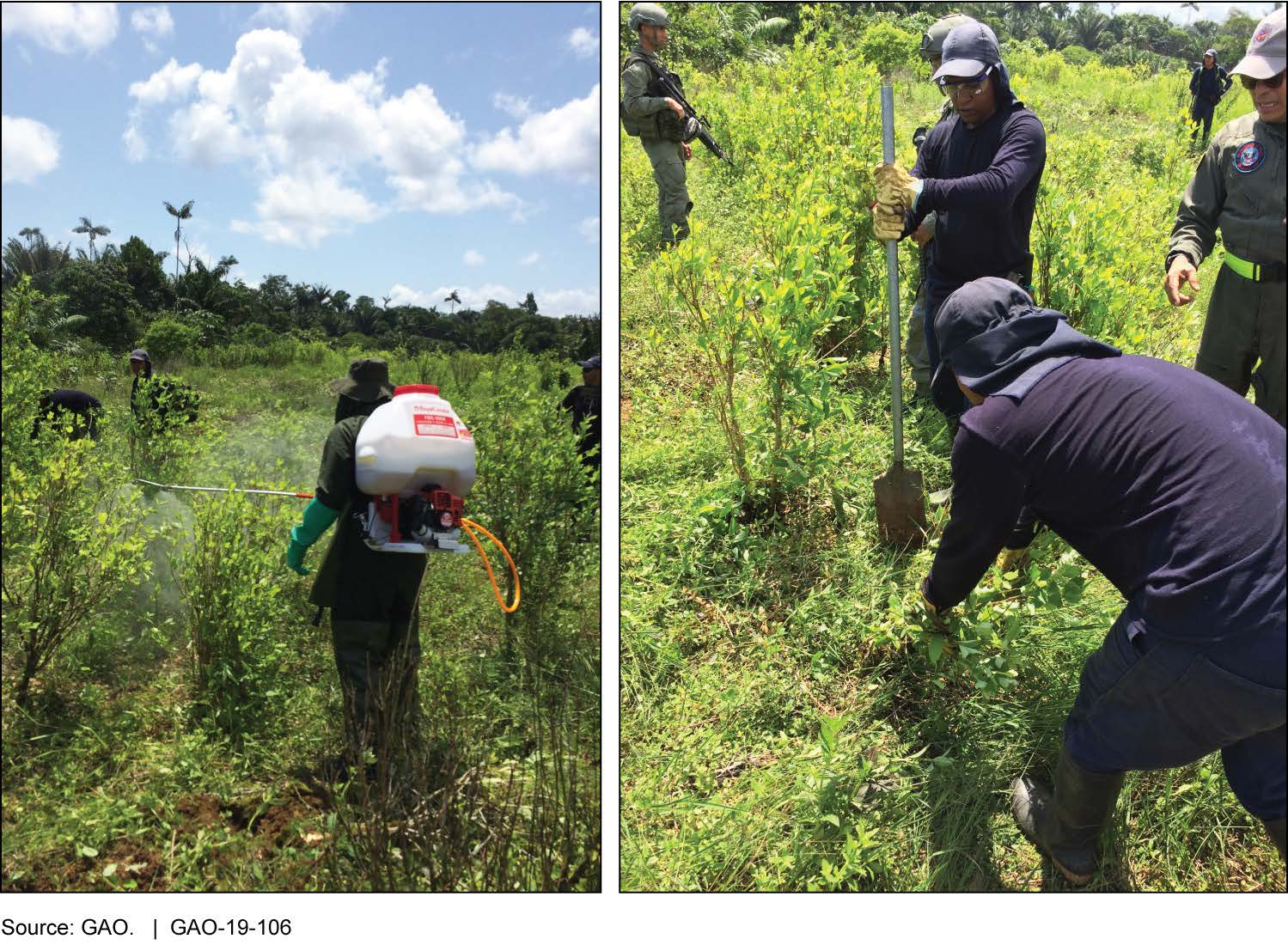
Coca eradication in Colombia

Coca eradication has been promoted by the United States government since 1961 as part of its war on drugs to eliminate the cultivation of coca, a plant whose leaves are used by indigenous peoples and in the manufacture of cocaine. The strategy was adopted in place of educational campaigns against drug use. The prohibitionist strategy is being pursued in the coca-growing regions of Colombia (including the former Plan Colombia), Peru, and (formerly) Bolivia, where it is controversial because of its environmental, health and socioeconomic impacts. Indigenous cultures in the Altiplano (such as the Aymaras) use coca leaf – which they call the "millenary leaf" – in many cultural traditions, notably for its medicinal qualities in alleviating the hunger, fatigue and headache symptomatic of altitude sickness. Coca growers are known as cocaleros, and some coca production for traditional use is legal in Peru, Bolivia and Chile.

=== Interdiction ===
The Consolidated Counterdrug Database (CCDB) is a U.S.-government data set created in the 1990s which compiles data on cocaine trafficking and seizures in the Western Hemisphere "transit zone," involving 26 U.S. agencies and 20 foreign partners. It provides a reliable, conservative record of cocaine movement and interdiction efforts, indicating that interdiction captures only a small fraction of trafficking events and has minimal impact on U.S. cocaine prices despite large seizures. The CCDB challenges optimistic views of drug-interdiction effectiveness and underscores the need for new policy approaches, but (despite being unclassified) is underutilized in research.

According to the United Nations, 589 tonnes of cocaine were seized globally by law-enforcement authorities in 2004. Colombia seized 188 t, the United States 166 t, Europe 79 t, Peru 14 t, Bolivia 9 t, and the rest of the world 133 t.

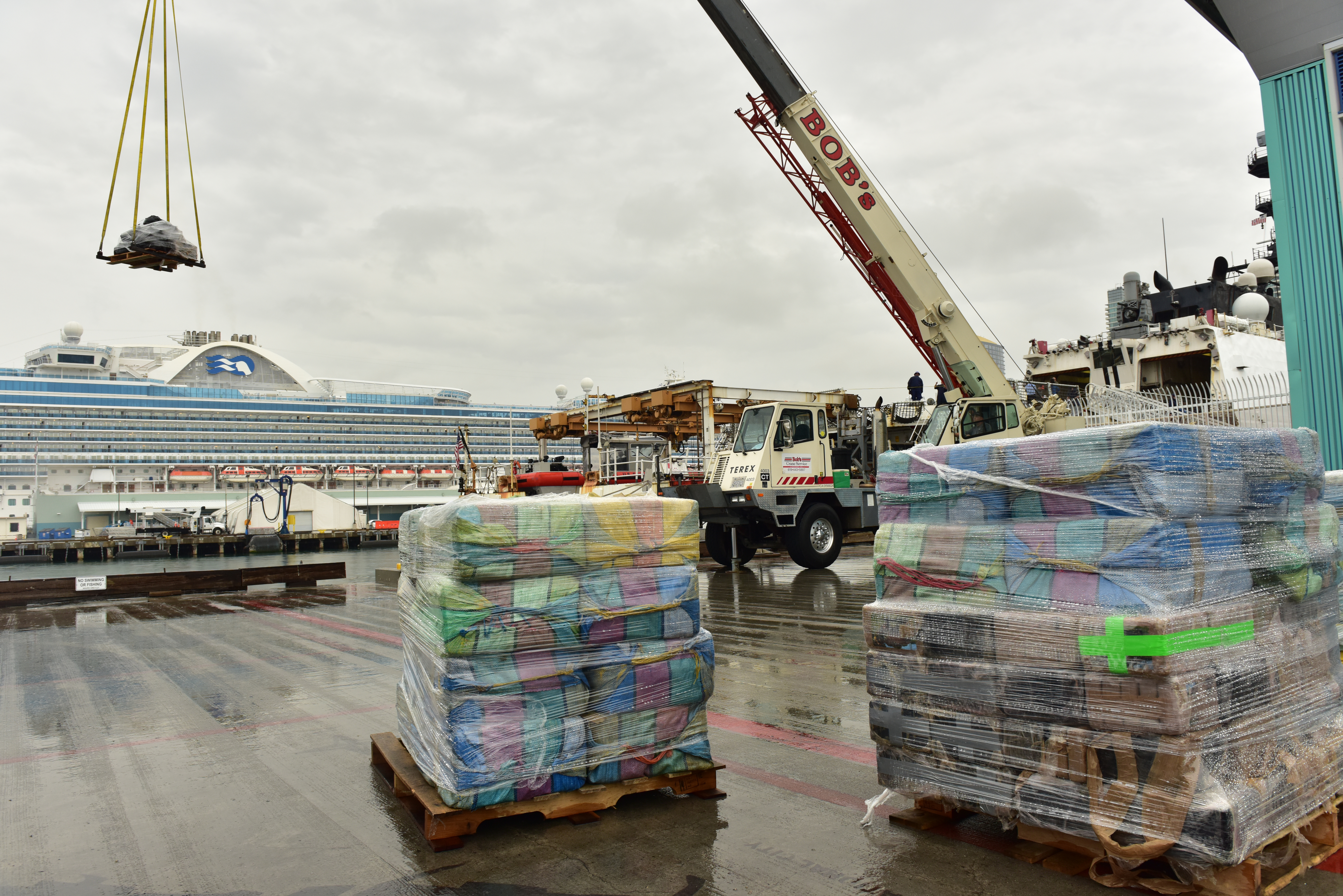
U.S. Coast Guard cutter Bertholf crew members offloading about 14 tonnes of cocaine in 2016

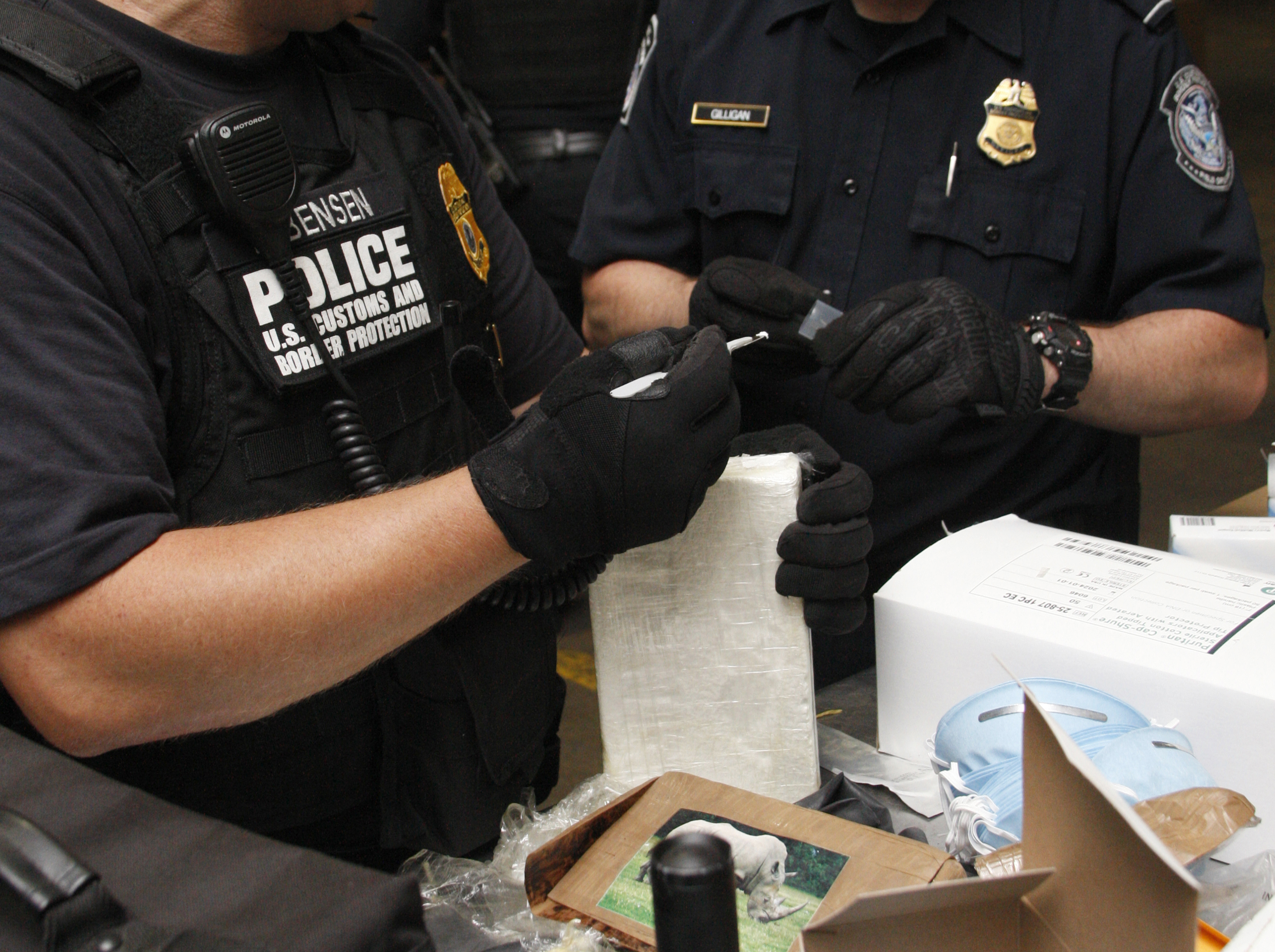
CBP police inspect a seized shipment of cocaine

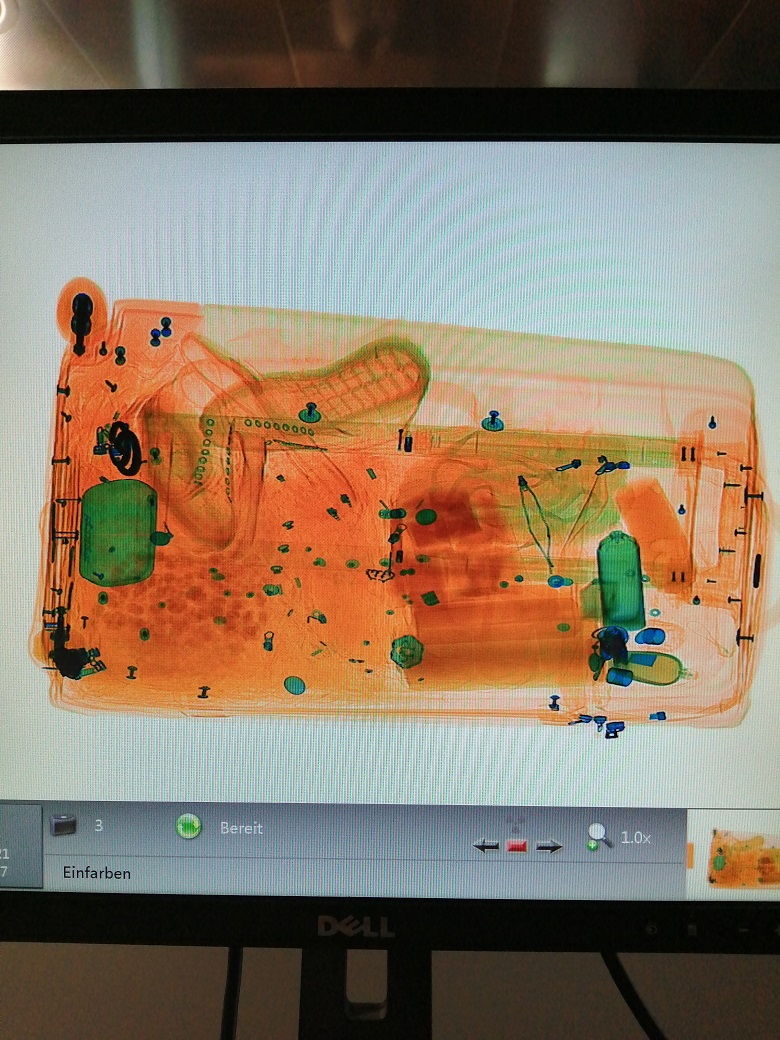
Kilogram of cocaine in luggage at Innsbruck Airport

== Liberalization ==
Colombian president Gustavo Petro proposed decriminalizing the production of cocaine and marijuana in August 2022, saying: "It is time for a new international convention that accepts that the war on drugs has failed." Petro asked in a September 20, 2022, speech to the United Nations General Assembly, "What is more poisonous for humanity, cocaine, coal or oil?" He said that the "addiction to irrational power, profit and money" was at the heart of the climate crisis and again called the war on drugs a failure, accusing the Global North of turning a blind eye to the destruction of the Amazon rainforest. Petro said in February 2025 that "cocaine is no worse than whisky," and its criminalization is rooted in regional bias rather than scientific evidence. He called for global legalization to curb trafficking, prompting criticism from health officials and political opponents.

In 2024, Amsterdam mayor Femke Halsema advocated the decriminalization and regulation of cocaine and other drugs to better combat organized crime. She called the international war on drugs counterproductive; it empowers criminals who collect billions in profit, destabilizing societies and increasing violence. Halsema supported a pragmatic approach focused on regulation to reduce public-health risks, and acknowledged widespread drug use as part of society. She noted that cocaine is less harmful than alcohol, and exaggerated risks lead to ineffective policies. The mayor warned that without regulation, Amsterdam could become a narco-state with criminal money flooding the economy and violence increasing.

== See also ==
- Alcohol and society
