= Deaths in April 1981 =

The following is a list of notable deaths in April 1981.

Entries for each day are listed alphabetically by surname. A typical entry lists information in the following sequence:

- Name, age, country of citizenship at birth, subsequent country of citizenship (if applicable), reason for notability, cause of death (if known), and reference.

== April 1981 ==
=== 3 ===
- Leo Kanner, 86, Austrian-American psychiatrist, physician, and social activist, he founded the field of child psychiatry and his research contributions laid the foundation for the fields of psychology, pediatrics, autism, and adolescent psychiatry, his concise and cogent clinical descriptions of children with autism continue to inform, and remain the standard against which current diagnostic criteria are measured,heart failure
- Juan Trippe, 81, American commercial aviation pioneer and entrepreneur, in August 1937, he accepted the highest annual prize for American aviation, the Collier Trophy, on behalf of Pan Am from President Franklin D. Roosevelt, awarded for the company's "establishment of the transpacific airline and the successful execution of extended overwater navigation and the regular operations thereof.", death due to his second stroke, a few months after suffering his first one

=== 5 ===
- Lucile Godbold, 80, American track and field athlete, she won a total of six medals at the 1922 Women's World Games, more than any other competitor at this event.
- Bob Hite, 38, American singer-songwriter, record producer, and record collector, he was a founding member and at times the leader of the long-running blues rock band Canned Heat, his private record collection reportedly included over 15,000 78s, death by heroin overdose. While he was already comatose, bystanders at the Palomino Club unsuccessfully attempted to revive him with a large dose of cocaine.
- Mitsuko Mito, 62, Japanese actress, she appeared in more than 150 films between 1935 and 1973

=== 7 ===
- Kit Lambert, 45, English record producer, record label owner, and talent manager, he became the then-new producer of the rock band the Who in 1966, he co-founded the independent record label Track Records in 1967, one of the first of its kind, signing up various new artists, including Jimi Hendrix,following a lawsuit against Lambert, the Who gained rights to all their recordings from Substitute (1966) onwards in 1977, in 1978, Lambert worked with some early punk bands, and he produced a couple of singles for the groups Razr and Chelsea, death by intracerebral hemorrhage after falling down a flight of stairs.According to the autobiography of Tony Visconti, Lambert had been pushed downstairs by a coke dealer
- Norman Taurog, 82, American film director and screenwriter, he received the Academy Award for Best Director for his pre-Code comedy film Skippy (1931)

=== 8 ===
- Omar Bradley, 88, American military officer,in 1950, Bradley was serving as the Chairman of the Joint Chiefs of Staff in the early phase of the Korean War, he had to deploy a force that was a shadow of its World War II counterpart, in his second memoir, Bradley stated that not arguing more forcefully in 1948 and 1949 for a sufficient defense budget "was a mistake... perhaps the greatest mistake I made in my postwar years in Washington."
- Adrian Hoven, 58, Austrian actor, film producer, and film director, he was both the leading actor and the co-producer of the Eurospy film Scorpions and Miniskirts (1967)
- Eric Rogers, 59, English composer, conductor and arranger, he is primarily remembered for composing the scores for twenty-two Carry On films, he orchestrated the original stage production of Oliver!, first performed at the New Theatre, West End, London, on 30 June 1960.

=== 10 ===
- Howard Thurman, 81, American philosopher, theologian, Christian mystic, and educator, in 1944, he co-founded the first major interracial, interdenominational church in the United States, death due to an unspecified "lingering illness"

=== 11 ===
- Marie Ney, 85, British character actress, having migrated to New Zealand during her childhood, she began her acting career in that country, and then continued it in Australia, when she moved back to her native United Kingdom, she acted at the Old Vic with many famous actors of the day.

=== 12 ===
- Joe Louis, 66, American professional boxer, he was the world heavyweight boxing champion from 1937 until 1949, he was a focal point of anti-Nazi sentiment leading up to and during World War II because of his historic rematch with the German boxer Max Schmeling in 1938, cardiac arrest

=== 14 ===
- Ivan Galamian, 78, Iranian-born Armenian-American violin teacherfrom Tabriz, he founded the Meadowmount School of Music in 1944, a summer program in Westport, New York, the school has remained operational and has since trained thousands of world-class musicians.

=== 15 ===
- Blake Butler, 56, English actor,he was a descendant of the Hiberno-Norman Butler dynasty, descended from James Butler, 10th Baron Dunboyne,he portrayed the librarian Mr. Wainwright in the first and third series of the British sitcom Last of the Summer Wine
- John Thach, 75, American naval aviator, air combat tactician, and admiral, he commanded USS Sicily during the Korean War and USS Franklin D. Roosevelt from 1953 until 1954, he served as the commander in chief of the United States Naval Forces Europe from 1965 until his retirement from the Navy in 1967

=== 16 ===
- Effa Manley, 84, American sports executive, she was the co-owner of the Newark Eagles baseball franchise in the Negro leagues with from 1935 until 1948,during World War II, she arranged for entertainers to perform for segregated Black American troops stationed at Fort Dix in New Jersey, when they were barred from the segregated USO clubs and canteens,heart attack

=== 17 ===
- Bruno Cirino, 44, Italian actor and stage director, he founded the theatrical company Teatroggi, heart attack while driving his car
- Muhammad Lafir, 50, Sri Lankan snooker player, he became the world champion in billiards in the December 1973 World Amateur Billiards Championship by defeating Satish Mohan of India in the finals held in Mumbai.

=== 18 ===
- James H. Schmitz, 69, German-American science fiction writer, he is primarily known for his works in the space opera subgenre, and for his strong female characters (such as Telzey Amberdon and Trigger Argee) who did not conform to the damsel in distress stereotype typical of science fiction in his era

=== 21 ===
- Eddie Sauter, 66, American composer and arranger, between 1957 and 1959, he was Kurt Edelhagen's successor as the leader of the SWF orchestra in Baden-Baden, Germany, he also orchestrated Broadway musicals such as The Apple Tree (1966), and It's a Bird... It's a Plane... It's Superman (1966), and 1776 (1969), heart attack

=== 24 ===
- Pat Conway, 50, American actor, he portrayed the Sheriff Clay Hollister in the Western television series Tombstone Territory (1957–1960), which was set in the Arizona Territory,renal failure
- Alice Lon, 54, American singer and dancer, she started performing as "The Champagne Lady" on The Lawrence Welk Show in 1955, her alto singing voice graced Lawrence Welk's show weekly until 1959, when she left the show over musical and money issues, although a popular legend developed that she was fired for showing too much leg and for crossing her feet on Welk's desk, something which he did not like, scleroderma, an autoimmune disease.
- Howard Purcell, 62, American comics artist and comics writer, he co-created the characters Sargon the Sorcerer, Gay Ghost, and Enchantress

=== 26 ===
- Jim Davis, 71, American actor, he portrayed Jock Ewing, the patriarch of the Ewing family, in the primetime soap opera Dallas, he was posthumously nominated for the 1981 Primetime Emmy Award for Outstanding Lead Actor in a Drama Series
- Madge Evans, 71, American actress and model, originally a child actress, at the age of 8 in 1917, she appeared in the Broadway production of Peter Ibbetson, she was honored with a star on the Hollywood Walk of Fame in 1960, for her contribution to the motion picture industry, cancer
- Herb Voland, 62, American actor, he began appearing on television during the medium's Golden Age, and he was a regular on such series as Omnibus, The Philco Television Playhouse and Studio One, stroke

=== 27 ===
- John Aspinwall Roosevelt, 65, American businessman and philanthropist

=== 28 ===
- Cliff Battles, 70, American professional football tailback and coach, he served as an assistant football coach at Columbia University from 1938 until 1943, he served as the head coach of the Brooklyn Dodgers of the All-America Football Conference from 1946 until 1947, following the end of his coaching career, he served as an associate of the company General Electric in the Washington Metropolitan Area until his retirement in 1979
- Mickey Walker, 79, American professional boxer, he is widely considered one of the greatest fighters ever, with ESPN ranking him 17th on their list of the 50 Greatest Boxers of All-Time and boxing historian Bert Sugar placing him 11th in his Top 100 Fighters catalogue, the statistical website BoxRec rates Walker as the 6th best boxer to have ended his career at middleweight, while The Ring Magazine founder Nat Fleischer placed him at No. 4 among the greatest middleweights of all time.

== Sources ==
- Blair, Clay (2003). The Forgotten War: America in Korea, 1950–1953. Naval Institute Press.
- Bright, Morris; Robert Ross (2000). Last of the Summer Wine: The Finest Vintage. London: BBC Worldwide Ltd. ISBN 0-563-55151-8.
- De La Parra, Fito (2000). Living the Blues: Canned Heat's Story of Music, Drugs, Death, Sex and Survival. eBookIt.com. ISBN 0-9676449-0-9.
