= Spiked drink =

Spiked drink may refer to:

- A mixed drink to which alcohol has been added
- A Mickey Finn, a drug-laced drink given to someone without their consent with the intent to incapacitate them
