= Happy powder =

Happy powder is slang that could refer to the following drugs:

- Cocaine
- Morphine
- Heroin
- A fruit-flavoured date rape drug in Hong Kong
