= Gray death (disambiguation) =

Gray death or Gray Death may refer to:

== Medicine ==
- Gray death, a street drug in the United States

== Music ==
- "Gray Death", a single by Xiu Xiu from Dear God, I Hate Myself

== Ecology ==
- Gray death, name of episodes of great smog pollution

== Fiction ==
- Gray Death, a mysterious nano-virus in Deus Ex video games
