= Gray death =

Slang term for opioid drug mixtures

Gray death is a slang term which refers to potent mixtures of synthetic opioids, for example benzimidazole opioids or fentanyl analogues, which were often sold on the street misleadingly as "heroin". However, other substances such as cocaine have also been laced with opioids that resulted in illness and death.

== History and etymology ==
The substance first appeared in America and was thought to be a unique chemical compound before being identified as a mixture of drugs. The first batch of gray death had a characteristic gray color.

== Composition ==
Samples have been found to contain heroin, fentanyl, carfentanil, and the designer drug U-47700.

== Dangers and treatment ==
As with other illicit narcotics, gray death carries a higher risk of serious adverse effects than prescribed opioids due to the unknown and inconsistent composition of the product. Even experienced opioid users risk serious injury or death when taking this drug mixture. In February 2022, 24 people in Argentina died after using cocaine laced with carfentanil.

Reversing a gray death overdose may require multiple doses of naloxone. By contrast, an overdose from morphine or from high-purity heroin would ordinarily need only one dose. This difficulty is regularly encountered when treating overdoses of high-affinity opioids in the fentanyl chemical family or with buprenorphine. The greater affinity of these substances for the μ-opioid receptor impedes the activity of naloxone, which is an antagonist at the receptor. It may be necessary to increase the dosage of naloxone or its frequency of administration in order to counteract respiratory depression.

== See also ==
- List of opioids
- List of designer drugs
- Opioid epidemic in the United States
- Mickey Finn (drugs)
- Whoonga
