= Flavor masker =

In the beverage, food, and pharmaceutical industries, a flavor masker is a chemical interaction that causes the absence of taste. This is known as the Farish effect, a phenomenon noted by 18th-century chemist William Farish. Contrary to popular belief, a flavor masker is not one chemical component; rather, it is two components that interact with the vallate papillae on the tongue with little or no reaction. Each component, individually, stimulates the vallate papillae.
