= Food testing strips =

Products testing for bacteria in food

Food testing strips are products that help determine whether or not food contains bacteria that can cause foodborne illness. These products can typically be used on food, water, and hard surfaces, and are often designed for quick and easy home and commercial use.

== Categories ==
Currently, there are two categories of food testing strips on the market.

One type of food testing strip is an assay enzyme reactant test, which requires the strip to be dipped into a blended mixture of food or test samples, distilled water and a reagent. Such tests are designed specifically to detect those strains of Listeria, Campylobacter, E.coli and Salmonella that are harmful to humans.

A second type of food testing strip is a gram-negative swab, which is usually administered directly to the food itself. Gram-negative swabs generally work faster than enzyme reactant strips, but they differ in that the gram-negative swabs are designed to detect a broad group of organisms, not just those that can cause foodborne illness in humans.

== Usage ==
The enzyme reactant test strips react when the buffer solution breaks the bacterial wall. This breach releases enzymes, which react upon contact to the enzyme test strips.

The gram-negative reactant activates when components of the gram-negative cell wall or specific enzymes are present, causing the swab itself to change color. This is not directly indicative of the presence or absence of human pathogen in the test sample.

People are now working on new ways to enhance these pathogen strips with silk pills and new nano-fiber membrane technology.

== See also ==
- Food safety
