= Mickey Finn (drugs) =

Drink laced with drugs

In American slang, a Mickey Finn, or a Mickey (often called a spiked drink), is a drink laced with an incapacitating agent, particularly chloral hydrate, given to someone without their consent with the intent to incapacitate them or "knock them out"; hence the colloquial name knockout drops. Serving someone a Mickey is most commonly referred to as "slipping someone a mickey". The "spiking" of drinks is a practice used by sexual predators and murderers at drinking establishments who lace alcoholic drinks with sedative drugs.

== History ==
=== Michael "Mickey" Finn ===
The "Mickey Finn" is most likely named after the manager and bartender of the Lone Star Saloon and Palm Garden Restaurant, which operated on South State Street in the Loop neighborhood of Chicago from 1896 to 1903. In December 1903, several Chicago newspapers documented that a Michael "Mickey" Finn managed the Lone Star Saloon and was accused of using knockout drops to incapacitate and rob some of his customers. The first known written example of the term, according to the Oxford English Dictionary (OED), is in 1915, twelve years after his trial.

The first popular account of Mickey Finn was given by Herbert Asbury in his 1940 book Gem of the Prairie: An Informal History of the Chicago Underworld. His cited sources are Chicago newspapers and the 1903 court testimony of Lone Star prostitute "Gold Tooth" Mary Thornton. Before his days as a saloon proprietor, Mickey Finn was known as a pickpocket and thief who often preyed on drunken bar patrons. The act of serving a Mickey Finn Special was a coordinated robbery orchestrated by Finn. First, Finn or one of his employees (including "house girls") would slip chloral hydrate into the unsuspecting patron's drink. The incapacitated patron would be escorted or carried into a back room by one of Finn's associates, who would then rob him and dump him in an alley. The victim would wake up the next morning in a nearby alley and would remember little or nothing of what had happened.

Finn's saloon was ordered to be closed on December 16, 1903. He was arrested again in 1918 for running an illegal bar in South Chicago.

=== Chicago restaurant poisonings ===
On June 22, 1918, four people were arrested, and over one hundred waiters were taken into custody over the apparent widespread practice of poisoning by waiters in Chicago. Guests who tipped poorly were given "Mickey Finn powder" in their food or drinks. Chemical analysis showed that it contained antimony potassium tartrate, also called "emetic tartar"; which in addition to causing vomiting, headaches, dizziness and depression, can be lethal in large quantities. Two bartenders were arrested for selling the powder at the bar at the waiters' union headquarters, and W. Stuart Wood and his wife were arrested for manufacturing the powder. Wood sold packets of it for 20 cents and referred to it as "Mickey Finn Powder" in a letter to union bartender John Millian. A follow-up article mentions the pursuit of a man named Jean Crones, who was believed to be responsible for poisoning over 100 people at a banquet held at the University Club of Chicago at which three people died.

== Society and culture ==
=== Media ===
The OED gives a chronology of the term, starting in 1915:

- The 1915 citation is from a photograph of a saloon in the December 26 edition of the Los Angeles Examiner. In the photograph is a sign that reads: "Try a Michael Finn cocktail".
- In the September 3, 1927, issue of the Chicago Daily Tribune, the phrase appears in an article on the use of ethylene for artificial ripening of fruit: "Applied to a human, ethylene is an anaesthetic as the old-time Mickey Finn in a lumber-jack saloon."

== See also ==
- Date rape drug
- Gray death
- Rape culture
