= Black cocaine =

Mixture of regular cocaine base or cocaine hydrochloride with various other substances

Black cocaine (Spanish: coca negra) is a mixture of regular cocaine base or cocaine hydrochloride with various other substances. These other substances are added

- to camouflage the typical appearance (pigments and dyes, e.g. charcoal),
- to interfere with color-based drug tests (mixing thiocyanates and iron salts or cobalt salts forms deep red complexes in solution),
- to make the mixture undetectable by drug sniffing dogs (activated carbon may sufficiently absorb trace odors).

Since the result is usually black, it is generally smuggled as toner, fingerprint powder, fertilizer, pigment, metal moldings, or charcoal. The pure cocaine base can be recovered from the mixture by extraction (freebase) or acid-base extraction (hydrochloride) using common organic solvents such as methylene chloride or acetone. A second process is required to convert cocaine base into powdered cocaine hydrochloride.

It was reported that in the mid-1980s Chilean dictator Augusto Pinochet ordered his army to build a clandestine cocaine laboratory in Chile where chemists mixed cocaine with other chemicals to produce what Pinochet's former top aide for intelligence Manuel Contreras described as a "black cocaine" capable of being smuggled past drug agents in the US and Europe.

Black cocaine was detected in Bogotá, Colombia in May 1998. In 2008, a new type of black cocaine was discovered by police in Spain. It had been manufactured into rubber-like sheets and made into luggage. In 2021, 860 kg (1,900 lb) of black cocaine disguised as charcoal, in 30 sacks among 1,364 sacks of charcoal, were seized in Spain, one of the biggest cocaine seizures recorded in Castilla y León.

== See also ==
- Cocaine paste
- Black tar heroin
- Pink cocaine
