= Cocaine paste =

Crude extract of the coca leaf

Coca paste (paco, basuco, oxi, pasta) is a crude extract of the coca leaf which contains 40% to 91% cocaine freebase along with companion coca alkaloids and varying quantities of benzoic acid, methanol, kerosene, and other extraction chemicals. In South America, coca paste, also known as cocaine base and, therefore, often confused with cocaine sulfate in North America, is relatively inexpensive and is widely used by low-income consumers. The coca paste is smoked in tobacco or cannabis cigarettes and use has become widespread in several Latin American countries. Traditionally, coca paste has been relatively abundant in South American countries such as Colombia where it is processed into cocaine hydrochloride ("street cocaine") for distribution to the rest of the world.

== History ==
In Argentina, cocaine paste was sold for about 30 cents per dose in 2006, enough for a powerful two-minute high. However, its price has increased because of higher demand, among other reasons.

== Preparation and effects ==
Crude cocaine preparation intermediates are marketed as cheaper alternatives to pure cocaine to local markets while the more expensive end product is exported to United States and European markets. Freebase cocaine paste preparations can be smoked. The psychological and physiological effects of the paco are quite severe. Media usually report that it is extremely toxic and addictive. According to a study by Intercambios, media appear to exaggerate the effects of paco. These stereotypes create a sense that nothing can be done to help a paco addict and thus stand in the way of rehabilitation programs.

== Basuco, Colombia ==
Basuco is the term used for cocaine paste in Colombia. The name comes from the Spanish words "base (de) cocaina" (cocaine base), and a wordplay with bazuca (bazooka).

Basuco is usually smoked, either rolled into a cigarette with tobacco or cannabis or inhaled through homemade pipes.

Another term for it is "bazoca," meaning "big mouth," possibly because workers hid it in their mouths to smuggle it into prisons—an offense punishable by death in cartels. In Western countries, it was sometimes called "bazooka". The slang "Bazooka Joe" was used to ask about purity and quantity in drug deals.

Originally, basuco was a waste product from cocaine production. Unlike powdered cocaine (which dissolves in water but burns when heated), basuco can be smoked but not snorted. To test purity, a known amount would be dissolved, filtered, and weighed before and after extraction. A less pure form, called "candy rock," often contained leftover cuts like sodium chloride.

Basuco is extremely addictive and considered stronger than crack cocaine in Europe and America.

Per the UN Office on Drugs and Crime (UNODC) in Colombia there were 4,644 basuco users in Bogotá alone; the drug's illicitness and accompanying homelessness prohibit an accurate count.

Since September 2012, a "Mobile Centre for Attention to Drug Addicts" (CAMAD) has been providing basic human services with an interdisciplinary team moving by bus in Bogota's worst affected neighbourhoods and working in a prison. Three hospitals participate with walk-in treatment, amongst them the public Hospital Centro Oriente. Gustavo Petro, the former Mayor of Bogotá and current President of Colombia, established CAMAD before finishing his second term as mayor in October 2015, and the future of the program is uncertain. Since CAMAD cannot offer services such as HIV testing, needle exchange, or safe injection sites, its "current levels of progress are not comparable with those of countries that have invested greater resources in the implementation of such schemes", per UNODOC. CAMAD has been criticised by a Colombian non-governmental organisation called "Technical Social Action" (ATS) for not doing enough, and also by "right-leaning politicians and the public for negotiating terms with the criminal gangs that control [certain] areas".

== Paco in Argentina, Brazil and Uruguay ==
Cocaine paste is very popular through several South American countries including Argentina, Brazil and Uruguay and is referred to as paco or pasta base in Brazil, Uruguay and Chile. Between 2001 and 2005, the use of paco in Argentina increased by 200%, with more than 150,000 young people taking it regularly.

In 2007, crackdowns in Peru and Bolivia forced traffickers to move to Argentina to produce cocaine which, according to the Los Angeles Times, is ideal for its "advanced chemical industry, [its] porous border with Bolivia and a notoriously corrupt police force." Eventually, this prompted traffickers to sell their byproduct to locals. The use underscores a significant shift in both Argentina and its larger neighbour Brazil, both of which in just a few years have become sizable cocaine consumers. Brazil now ranks as the second largest total consumer of cocaine in the world after the United States, per the United States Department of State.

== Slang terms ==
=== Argentina ===
- Paco
- Basoco
- Pico
- Base
- Tubo
- Pasta Base

=== Chile ===
- Angustia (anguish)
- Cocaína de los pobres (poor man's cocaine)
- Pasta (Paste)
- Pasta Base (Base Paste)
- Pastero (Paste user)
- Palo Rosa (Mixed with heroin or opium)
- Mono (Monkey, also withdrawal symptom. Mixed with tobacco)
- Marciano (Martian. Mixed with marijuana)

=== Italy ===
- Pasta di coca
- Base
- Boccia
- Cruda

=== Morocco ===
- L'boufa / L'poufa

== Oxi ==
Oxi (abbr. from Portuguese oxidado) is a stimulant drug based on cocaine paste originally developed in the Brazilian Amazon forest region. It is reportedly a mixture of cocaine paste, gasoline, kerosene and quicklime (calcium oxide). This description may be a garbled account of an acid-base extraction procedure. Its popularity has soared in the last decade, in part due to its strongly addictive effect and lower price than other common drugs. While in the 1980s it could be found mainly in the Amazon region, the police in major Brazilian cities have recently reported significant drug arrests.

== See also ==
- Black cocaine
- Black tar heroin
- Crack cocaine
