= Monoacetylmorphine =

Monoacetylmorphine may refer to:

- 3-Monoacetylmorphine, a less active metabolite of heroin
- 6-Monoacetylmorphine, an active metabolite of heroin
