= Acetylmorphine =

Acetylmorphine may refer to:

- 3-Monoacetylmorphine (3-acetylmorphine), an inactive metabolite of heroin
- 6-Monoacetylmorphine (6-acetylmorphine), an active metabolite of heroin
