= Cheese (recreational drug) =

Heroin-based recreational drug

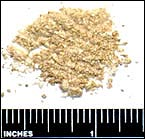
Example of cheese, seized by the U.S. Drug Enforcement Administration.

"Cheese" is a heroin-based recreational drug that came to the attention of the media inside and outside the United States after a string of deaths among adolescents in Dallas, between 2005 and 2007. As of 2012 the drug use was now among older people who were teenagers around the period the drug was first discovered.

Cheese is a combination of drugs, made by combining heroin with crushed tablets of certain over-the-counter cold medication, such as Tylenol PM. Such cold medications contain acetaminophen (paracetamol), the active ingredient in Tylenol, and the antihistamine diphenhydramine, the active ingredient in Benadryl. Cheese samples obtained in north Dallas contained between 2% and 8% heroin, in contrast to the 30% commonly found in black tar heroin. Users commonly take the powder by insufflation ("snorting") rather than by intravenous injection. This mixture is also known as "Tylenol With Smack", by analogy to the Tylenol With Codeine series.

Due to the high concentrations of non-opiate substances relative to the diamorphine content of the drug, abuse and overdose of cheese are more dangerous than pure-form opiate overdoses. Emergency personnel must address the overdose effects of each component of the drug, since the contents and concentrations of each component vary widely among batches they must wait for either the completion of the toxicology report to begin treatment or wait for the effects of each drugs overdose to manifest. The acetaminophen content of the drug induces severe, irreversible damage to the liver when taken in high doses for long periods of time. Very high doses of acetaminophen are capable of producing acute liver failure and death within hours, and patients who survive this acute phase of the toxicity generally require dialysis and eventually a liver transplant. Due to the many methods of preparation a user can not know how much acetaminophen is in any given batch and therefore can not reliably determine a safe dose. A dose of the last batch which produced no toxic effects may produce lethal effects in the next batch.

== Emergence ==
The drug made many news headlines when it appeared in several public middle and high schools in Dallas, Texas. The United States Drug Enforcement Administration, some police agencies and the Dallas Independent School District (DISD) dubbed the mixture "starter heroin." The district handled fifty-four property cases and found twenty-four felony offenses involving "cheese" between August 15, 2005 and March 1, 2006, at eleven schools. On February 24, 2007, United Press International reported that DISD would increase drug-sniffing dog patrols in order to eliminate Cheese from its schools. As of mid-2007, police records for the northwest quadrant of Dallas showed almost daily arrests for and confiscations of the drug.

According to Dallas school district authorities, Hispanic teenagers are the demographic group most frequently charged with possession of the drug; Hispanics also constitute a majority (60 percent) of all DISD students. By February 1, 2007, usage of Cheese was reported in the fourth-grade level at several elementary schools; By February 2007, Monty Moncibais, a detective of the Dallas Police Narcotics Division, noted 71 cheese-related arrests in children aged 10 through 16.

Dallas-area treatment centers have noted that the drug's growing use has led to a lowering in the age of teens admitted to their programs. From a typical clientele of 15- to 17-year-olds admitted under court order, one Dallas-area center noted it had begun to admit 11, 12, and 13-year-olds voluntarily or at a parent's request.

Newsweek posted an article about Cheese, titled "Stopping a Kid Killer," in 2007. Jack Schafer, a columnist for Slate, criticized the Newsweek article; Schafer believes that the Newsweek article does not adequately explain the process of creating Cheese and did not use scientists as sources. Jane C. Maxwell, a senior research scientist of the Gulf Coast Addiction Technology Transfer Center at The University of Texas at Austin, stated in "“Cheese” Heroin: Status as of May 2, 2007" that she believes that the effect of Cheese could increase due to media reporting aspects such as "unsubstantiated numbers" and "sensationalistic emphasis" regarding "new highs" and "schoolboy drugs," leading to copycat outbreaks.

In mid-2007, a number of area stores opted either to remove Tylenol PM and similar products from their shelves or to move them to shelves within a pharmacist's view or control. The manager of a Fiesta Mart supermarket in northwest Dallas explained his store's policy shift regarding various diphenhydramine-containing products by saying local youths were stealing these items, adding, "We didn't want to be part of the problem or anybody dying," implying that the store also pulled the products to curb abuse. The manager stated that theft decreased after removing the products, and various local Carnival supermarkets and Walgreens pharmacies also voluntarily shifted the products to pharmacist-controlled or -monitored shelves.

The Dallas Morning News unofficially reported that arrests for Cheese in DISD decreased. The district performed 71 arrests for Cheese in the 2006-2007 school year. During the 2007-2008 school year from August to December the district performed 17 arrests. The number of children seeking treatment for use of Cheese remained steady. The paper reported that usage of Cheese spread from the northwest Dallas area and into areas outside of Dallas County. Deputy Chief Julian Bernal, the commander of the narcotics division of the Dallas Police, said that he encountered more White and Black teenagers using the drug. Michelle Hemm, the director of the Phoenix Academy of Dallas, believes that Cheese arrests decreased because users took more care to conceal the drugs or did not bring the drugs to schools for fear of detection.

== Production methods ==
According to a 14-year-old girl being treated at the Phoenix Academy, water is added to the heroin. The watered-down heroin, often called "monkey juice," is mixed with Tylenol PM tablets. The makers of Cheese heat the mixture to remove excess water, resulting in the final product.

== Deaths ==
Deaths directly attributable to this form of heroin are difficult to confirm because coroner's offices frequently do not have a method to track cause of death to one specific form of a drug. Centralized reporting of cheese heroin deaths does not exist in Texas since each county has its own official to sign death certificates.

=== 2006: The first deaths are reported ===
Several of the deaths are notable due either to the publicity that followed or unusual circumstances of the case. One of the earliest published instances of a death attributed to cheese heroin was that of Karen Becerra, an 18-year-old high school senior found dead by her father in their West Dallas home on April 24, 2006. Police attributed her death to snorting cheese and drinking alcohol. On November 1, 2006, 17-year-old Keith Witherspoon died in nearby Mesquite; a story the following month in The Dallas Morning News profiled Witherspoon as "the first Dallas-area youth publicly known to have died of a heroin overdose since the 'cheese' concerns were raised." The death was also notable because Mesquite is located northeast of Dallas, indicating the problem had moved beyond its origins in the northwest quadrant of the city.

=== Early 2007: Deaths in younger populations ===
The first middle-school "cheese" death in published accounts was that of Oscar Gutierrez, a 15-year-old eighth grader in northwest Dallas, who died February 18, 2007; his brother stated that the boy had previously survived an overdose of the same drug. Community rallies followed Gutierrez' death as parents and others urged the police and school district to become more active in fighting what was viewed as a growing problem. The death of Fernando Cortez Jr., a high school student, on March 31, 2007, led to further community activism. Initially this death was linked to cheese heroin based on the father's comments in press reports; the father said his son was at a Corvallis party when he was offered "cheese" and that the boy had not tried drugs before that he was aware of. Cortez's father went on to become a speaker at community meetings within the school system, urging that parents keep closer watch over their children. On April 24, the same day toxicology results were announced confirming the link to cheese, police announced a family friend would be charged with murder for having mixed the drugs for Cortez.

=== Spring/summer 2007: Old deaths examined, new deaths occur ===
Between the time of Cortez Jr.'s death and the announcement of his toxicology tests in late April, The Dallas Morning News published the results of a lengthy analysis of autopsy results between 2005 and 2007, conducted in concert with the Dallas County medical examiner's office, which suggested that as many as 17 deaths among adolescents during that period were attributable to cheese heroin, not including the Cortez death. The conclusion was based in part on the presence of both heroin and diphenhydramine in the blood of the deceased; additionally, the families of 11 victims confirmed the deceased had used cheese heroin. Some toxicologists questioned the results due to the absence of acetaminophen. Other experts argued that acetaminophen has a shorter half-life and might have been metabolized by the body prior to death. Susan Dalterio, a University of Texas at San Antonio pharmacology expert, insisted that the combination was unlikely to be a coincidence, as a person sleepy from diphenhydramine would be unlikely to be abusing heroin at the same time. It is common for users of heroin and other opioid drugs to take diphenhydramine-containing medications as an attempt to alleviate side effects resulting from histamine release induced by opioid administration, such as pruritus, as well as potentiate the sedative effects of the drug.

On April 18, days after findings from the medical examiner's review were published, two more deaths occurred, though once again their connection to cheese heroin took weeks to be confirmed. The body of 18-year-old Keridma Godina was found on a porch in Balch Springs the day after her death; police charged two men immediately with abandoning the body, but were unable to make any drug-related charge when confirmation of the link to cheese came three weeks later. The death of 17-year-old Lauren Paulson of The Colony, was reported that same week, but was not linked to cheese heroin until late summer. In mid-May, the Dallas County medical examiner's office confirmed that two earlier teen deaths — one in January and another in April — were confirmed by toxicology tests as linked to cheese heroin; these additions brought the known toll at that time to 21 deaths among those 18 and under, not including the Paulson case.

Over the summer vacation months of 2007, the push against cheese heroin continued. Parents and police organized a June 30 March, Sen. John Cornyn visited the area as part of an anti-cheese campaign in early July, the director of the White House Office of National Drug Control Policy gave a press conference from Dallas ISD headquarters in August praising the district's efforts, and local stores pulled Tylenol PM and similar drugs from the shelves to make them less accessible. July also saw the addition of two more names to the list of deaths, as Paulson's death became the 22nd linked to the drug, and a 17-year-old member of a high school drill team died at Parkland Memorial Hospital eleven days after being found unconscious on the morning her group was to take its yearbook photo.

=== Autumn 2007: Deaths across north Texas ===
The spread of the drug to the outlying suburbs of Dallas was confirmed in September by the return of toxicology reports from the July 13 death of an 18-year-old student from McKinney, located northeast of Dallas in Collin County, and from two July deaths in nearby Tarrant County, one involving a 17-year-old male and the other, a 26-year-old male. Additional suburban deaths in September — in Irving to the west and Rockwall to the east — were believed to be linked to cheese heroin, though police cautioned toxicology reports would not likely be complete until November. The Tarrant County medical examiner's office announced on September 24 that a review of deaths in Tarrant County (west) and Denton County (north) showed an additional 15 deaths between 2004 and 2007 that appeared to be linked to "cheese," and Collin and Rockwall counties had reported one death each. These new figures brought the total number of deaths associated with cheese heroin in northern Texas to 40, a figure that included many older adults along with those age 18 and under.
