= Cannabis policy of the Nixon administration =

During the administration of American President Richard Nixon (1969–1974), the United States turned to increasingly harsh measures against cannabis use, and a step away from proposals to decriminalize or legalize the drug. The administration began the war on drugs, with Nixon in 1971 naming drug abuse as "public enemy number one in the United States."

== Operation Intercept ==
Operation Intercept was an anti-drug measure announced by Nixon on at 2:30pm on Sunday, September 21, 1969, resulting in a near shutdown of border crossings between Mexico and the United States. The initiative was intended to reduce the entry of Mexican marijuana into the United States at a time that was considered to be the prime harvest season.

== Controlled Substances Act ==
In 1969, Nixon announced that his Attorney General John N. Mitchell would prepare comprehensive new measures to address drug use in the United States. Under 1970's Controlled Substances Act, cannabis was listed as Schedule I with other drugs having maximum abuse potential but no medicinal value.

== Shafer Commission ==
Nixon rejected the pro-decriminalization findings of Canada's Le Dain Commission and the British Wootton Report.

In the early 1970s, Nixon formed the National Commission on Marihuana and Drug Abuse (Shafer Commission), telling Shafer "I want a goddam strong statement... one that just tears the ass out of" cannabis supporters. However, the Shafer Commission's 1972 report stated that cannabis should be decriminalized, and that prosecuting cannabis was a distraction from the fight against heroin. Nixon was infuriated by this betrayal from Shafer, and refused to appoint him a federal judgeship.

== Drug Enforcement Administration ==
The Drug Enforcement Administration (DEA) was established by Nixon in 1973.
