= Black tar heroin =

Impure form of heroin

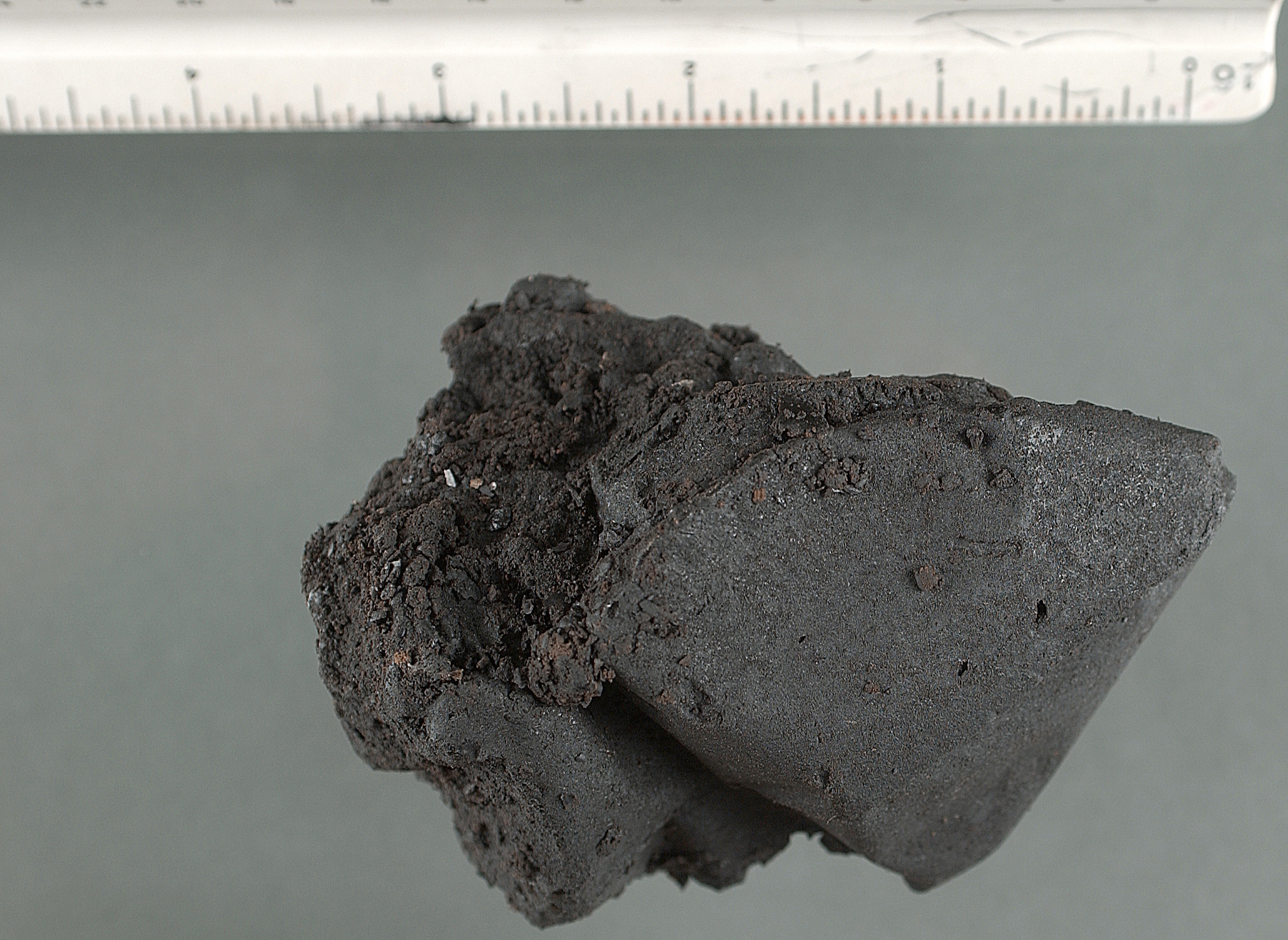
Black tar heroin

Black tar heroin is a form of heroin that is sticky like tar or hard like coal. Its dark color is the result of crude processing methods that leave behind impurities. Despite its name, black tar heroin can also be dark orange or dark brown in appearance.

The chemical name of heroin is diacetylmorphine. Other forms of heroin require additional steps of purification post acetylation. With black tar, the product's processing stops immediately after acetylation. Its unique consistency however is due to acetylation without a reflux apparatus; as is the case with homebake heroin in Australia and New Zealand, this crude acetylation results in a gelatinous mass.

Black tar as a type holds a variable admixture of morphine derivatives—predominantly 6-MAM (6-monoacetylmorphine), which is another result of crude acetylation. The lack of proper reflux during acetylation fails to remove much of the moisture retained in the acetylating agent, acetic anhydride. The acetic anhydride reacts with the moisture to produce the milder acetylating agent glacial acetic acid which is unable to acetylate the 3 position of the morphine molecule. It is harder to acetylate the 6 position without affecting the 3 position in vitro because of the conditions required for the 3 position, so 6-MAM is usually a product of opioid metabolism inside the body.

Black tar heroin is often produced in Latin America, and is most commonly found in the western and southern parts of the United States, while also being occasionally found in Western Africa. It has a varying consistency depending on manufacturing methods, cutting agents, and moisture levels, from tarry goo in the unrefined form to a uniform, light-brown powder when further processed and cut with a variety of agents. One of the more notable compounds commonly added to heroin is lactose.

== Composition ==
Pure morphine and heroin are both fine white powders. Black tar heroin's unique appearance and texture are due to its acetylation without the benefit of the usual reflux apparatus.

The assumption that tar has fewer adulterants and diluents is a misconception. The most common adulterant is lactose, which is added to tar via dissolving of both substances in a liquid medium, reheating and filtering, and then recrystallizing. This process is very simple and can be accomplished in any kitchen with no level of expertise needed.

The price per kilogram of black tar heroin has increased from one-tenth that of South American powder heroin in the mid-1990s to between one-half and three-quarters in 2003 due to increased distributional acumen combined with increased demand in black tar's traditional realm of distribution. Black tar heroin distribution has steadily risen in recent years, while that of U.S. East Coast powder varieties has dropped; heroin production in Colombia decreased from the late 1990s into the early 2000s.

== Adverse effects ==
People who intravenously inject black tar heroin are at higher risk of venous sclerosis than those injecting powder heroin. In this condition, the veins narrow and harden which makes repeated injection there nearly impossible.

The presence of 6-monoacetylcodeine found in tar heroin has not been tested in humans but has been shown to be toxic alone and more toxic when mixed with mono- or di- acetyl morphine, potentially making tar more toxic than refined diamorphine.

Black tar heroin injectors can be at increased risk of life-threatening bacterial infections, in particular necrotizing soft tissue infection. The practice of "skin-popping" or subcutaneous injection predisposes to necrotizing fasciitis or necrotizing cellulitis from Clostridium perfringens, while deep intramuscular injection predisposes to necrotizing myositis.

Tar heroin injection can also be associated with Clostridium botulinum infection, causing botulism. Since the final stage of black tar heroin production would kill any spores (a combination of high temperature and strong acid), contamination is likely due to choice of cutting agent. Almost all cases occur in users who inject intramuscularly or subcutaneously, rather than injecting intravenously.

Black tar heroin users can also be at increased risk of bone and joint infections that stem from hematogenous seeding or local extension of the skin and soft tissue infections. Any joint can be infected, though previous studies have shown that the knee and hip are most commonly affected in heroin injectors. Associated bone infections can include septic bursitis, septic tenosynovitis, and osteomyelitis. Septic arthritis and skin and soft tissue infections often present visible and/or systematic symptoms, while osteomyelitis usually presents localized pain.

== Alternative routes of administration ==
In some parts of the United States, black tar may be the only form of heroin that is available. Many users do not inject.

- Smoking or vaporizing: Using these methods, rather than injecting, is thought to reduce the risk of infections, since the high temperatures involved are more likely to kill bacteria and spores.
- Grinding into a powder form for snorting: This is one of the more popular ways of consuming black tar for those who do not wish to use needles. The black tar heroin is put into some sort of blender and mixed in with lactose. This creates a fine black powder product that can be easily snorted.
- Water looping: Water looping is when a user places the heroin in an empty eye dropper bottle, or a syringe with the needle removed. The user allows the heroin to completely dissolve into water and the solution is dropped into the nose. This at times can be wasteful if a user allows too much of the solution to go down the throat.
- Drinking: This is done similar to the water looping method. Instead of being delivered through the nose, the solution is swallowed.
- Suppository: The most effective route of administration which does not require a needle, is accomplished by delivering a solution (via syringe) or lubricated mass of the narcotic deep into the rectum or vagina.

== See also ==
- Black cocaine
