= Heroin-assisted treatment =

Prescribing of semi-synthetic heroin

Heroin-assisted treatment (HAT), or diamorphine-assisted treatment, refers to a type of Medication-Assisted Treatment (MAT) where semi-synthetic heroin is prescribed to opioid addicts who do not benefit from, or cannot tolerate, treatment with one of the established drugs used in opioid replacement therapy such as methadone or buprenorphine/naloxone (brand name Suboxone). For this group of patients, heroin-assisted treatment has proven superior in improving their social and health situation. Heroin-assisted treatment is fully a part of the national health system in Switzerland, Germany, the Netherlands, Canada, and Denmark. Additional trials are being carried out in the United Kingdom, Norway, and Belgium.

== History ==
The British have had a system of heroin maintenance since the 1920s. For decades it supplied a few hundred addicts nationwide, most of whom were doctors themselves. It was de-emphasized considerably during the 1960s-1980s as a result of the U.S.-led war on drugs. In the 1980s and early 1990s, Dr John Marks ran heroin-prescribing clinics in Liverpool, Widnes and Warrington that were highly controversial. Because of the lack of large-scale trials, only anecdotal evidence existed as to the efficacy of the treatment. This changed in 1994 when Switzerland, faced with one of the largest open drug scenes in Europe at the time, started large-scale trials on the potential use of diamorphine as a maintenance drug. They proved diamorphine to be a viable maintenance drug which has shown equal or better rates of success than methadone in terms of assisting long-term users establish stable, crime-free lives. These results encouraged countries like Germany and the Netherlands to conduct their own trials and finally to include heroin-assisted treatment fully as a part of the national health system in 2009.

In Switzerland, heroin has been made available under supervision to addicts since around 1994.

Several studies have been conducted between 1994 and 1996.

== Positions ==
=== Favor ===
In recent years the British have begun moving towards the inclusion of heroin maintenance programs as a legitimate component of their National Health Service. In 2013 European Union's European Monitoring Centre for Drugs and Drug Addiction issued guidelines for the years 2013–2020; for the first time since the EMCDDA's 1995 inception, the group advocated "reducing the health and social risks and harms caused by drugs" in addition to longstanding policies of lessening demand and supply. Groups such as United Nations Office on Drugs and Crime and the Transnational Institute have released documents advocating harm-reduction strategies, though only the latter mentions heroin-assisted therapy.

=== Opposition ===
Groups such as the Drug Free America Foundation, have criticized heroin-assisted treatment along with other harm reduction strategies for allegedly creating the perception that certain behaviors can be partaken safely, such as illicit drug use, claiming that this may lead to an increase in that behavior by people who would otherwise be deterred.

We oppose so-called `harm reduction´ strategies as endpoints that promote the false notion that there are safe or responsible ways to use drugs. That is, strategies in which the primary goal is to enable drug users to maintain addictive, destructive, and compulsive behavior by misleading users about some drug risks while ignoring others.

Such shortcomings arguably exist with some harm reduction measures, such as supervised injection facilities. These facilities provide users with the information and equipment necessary to avoid infection with diseases such as HIV, but leave them dependent on the black market. So users still face the health risk associated with the injection of impure street drugs and they still face the enormous financial strain of financing their addiction.

In the case of heroin-assisted treatment however, users are provided with a form of pharmaceutical-grade heroin injection solution which doctors consider fit for injection. And as doctors refrain from drastic changes in dose and provide post-injection monitoring, overdoses are rare and can be quickly treated with opioid antagonists like naloxone. Thus, patients in heroin-assisted treatment are relieved from the major complex of problems that defines illicit heroin use. Synthetic heroin taken under the aforementioned conditions is not neurotoxic and has few long-term side effects beside constipation and dependency. And while it had been speculated that the availability of such treatment options might change public perception of the risks associated with drug use and might lead to an increase in illicit drug use, the incidence of heroin abuse in Switzerland has declined sharply since the introduction of heroin-assisted treatment. As a study published in The Lancet concluded:

The harm reduction policy of Switzerland and its emphasis on the medicalisation of the heroin problem seems to have contributed to the image of heroin as unattractive for young people."

— Nordt, Carlos, and Rudolf Stohler, "Incidence of Heroin Use in Zurich, Switzerland: A Treatment Case Register Analysis"

Also, the notion that patients in such treatment programs are enabled to maintain "destructive behavior" contradicts the findings that patients significantly recover in terms of both their social and health situation. A clinical follow-up report on the German study on this matter found that 40% of all patients and 68% of those able to work had found employment after four years of treatment. Some even started a family after years of homelessness and delinquency.

== See also ==
- Opioid agonist therapy
- Drug policy of Switzerland
- Drug policy of the Netherlands
