= 6-Monoacetylcodeine =

Chemical compound

Clinical data
- Other names: 6-acetylcodeine
- Routes of administration: Intravenous (if present in heroin)
- ATC code: none

Identifiers
- IUPAC name: 3-methoxy-6-acetoxy-(5α,6α)-7,8-didehydro-4,5-epoxy-17-methylmorphinan
- CAS Number: 6703-27-1
- PubChem CID: 5745725
- ChemSpider: 4588962
- UNII: U59401ETXH
- CompTox Dashboard (EPA): DTXSID50213224
- ECHA InfoCard: 100.169.473

Chemical and physical data
- Formula: C_{20}H_{23}NO_{4}
- Molar mass: 341.407 g·mol^{−1}
- 3D model (JSmol): Interactive image
- SMILES: O=C(O[C@H]2\C=C/[C@H]5[C@@H]4N(CC[C@@]51c3c(O[C@H]12)c(OC)ccc3C4)C)C
- InChI: InChI=1S/C20H23NO4/c1-11(22)24-16-7-5-13-14-10-12-4-6-15(23-3)18-17(12)20(13,19(16)25-18)8-9-21(14)2/h4-7,13-14,16,19H,8-10H2,1-3H3/t13-,14+,16-,19-,20-/m0/s1; Key:MFXFQKMUCYHPFQ-BKRJIHRRSA-N

6-Monoacetylcodeine (6-MAC) is an acetate ester of codeine in which the hydroxyl group on the 6 position has been acetylated. It is occasionally present as an impurity in street heroin and is typically created when attempting to create heroin from a solution of morphine in which some of the codeine from the original opium solution still remains. It is formed either through the addition of acetic anhydride, which can only acetylate the 6 position on the codeine or as a result of the addition of acetic acid with a catalyst in an attempt to create 6-monoacetylmorphine, the equivalent ester of morphine which is slightly more potent than heroin itself. 6-monoacetylcodeine is eventually metabolised into codeine and then into morphine. Since only illegally produced heroin is likely to contain 6-MAC, testing for the presence of it in the urine can be used as a fairly reliable method of detecting the use of illicit heroin, as opposed to prescription painkillers. 6-MAC is the precursor for 14-hydroxycodeinenone which was the original precursor to oxycodone. The 7-8 double-bond was reduced using the hyposulfite ion to reduce the 6-7 double-bond. While the acute toxicity of 6-monoacetylcodeine has not been studied in man, animal studies have shown that in animal models its convulsant effects have been proved and when mixed with mono- or di- acetyl morphine, lowers the convulsant threshold of the mixture still further.

== See also ==
- 6-Monoacetylmorphine, the equivalent form of morphine
- Codeine
- Poppy tea
