= Homebake (slang) =

Slang for non-prescription opioids

Homebake (or home-bake) is a slang name most commonly used in Australia, and New Zealand for non-prescription opioids. The term refers to a crude mix of opioid class of drugs such as heroin, morphine and monoacetylated derivatives produced from pharmaceutical morphine tablets or morphine that has been produced through the demethylation of codeine when it is difficult to obtain heroin.
