= Wootton Report =

British study on cannabis

The Wootton Report on cannabis (dated 1968 and published in January 1969) was compiled by the Sub-committee on Hallucinogens of the United Kingdom Home Office Advisory Committee on Drug Dependence. The sub-committee was chaired by Baroness Wootton of Abinger. Originally intended to be a report on both cannabis and LSD, the panel members decided to limit their report to cannabis.

== The Report ==
The second paragraph of the Report reads:

"Our first enquiries were proceeding — without publicity — into the pharmacological and medical aspects, when other developments gave our study new and increased significance. An advertisement in The Times on 24th July, 1967 represented that the long-asserted dangers of cannabis were exaggerated and that the related law was socially damaging, if not unworkable. This was followed by a wave of debate about these issues in Parliament, the Press and elsewhere, and reports of enquiries, e.g. by the National Council for Civil Liberties. This publicity made more explicit the nature of some current ‘protest’ about official policy on drugs; defined more clearly some of the main issues in our study; and led us to give greater attention to the legal aspects of the problem. Government spokesmen made it clear that any future development of policy on cannabis would have to take account of the Advisory Committee’s Report. Accordingly, we decided to give first priority to presenting our views on cannabis."

The Report seemed to give cannabis something resembling a clean bill of health. It said:

"The long term consumption of cannabis in moderate doses has no harmful effects (…) Cannabis is less dangerous than the opiates, amphetamines and barbiturates, and also less dangerous than alcohol. (…) An increasing number of people, mainly young, in all classes of society are experimenting with this drug, and substantial numbers use it regularly for social pleasure. There is no evidence that this activity is causing violent crime, or is producing in otherwise normal people conditions of dependence or psychosis requiring medical treatment (…) there are indications that (cannabis) may become a functional equivalent of alcohol."

The Advisory Committee appeared also to accept the principle of decriminalisation. The main proposal in the report was that "possession of a small amount of cannabis should not normally be regarded as a serious crime to be punished by imprisonment". The accompanying letter of submission to the Home Secretary said: "The committee is generally of the view that imprisonment is no longer an appropriate punishment for those who are unlawfully in possession of a small amount".

=== Responses ===
The Home Secretary at the time, James Callaghan, suggested he would reject the report. He told Parliament that on his reading, the committee had been "over-influenced" by the "lobby" for "legalisation" responsible for "that notorious advertisement", adding that "it was wrong for the committee to report on one drug in isolation in the way that it did". However, a year later he introduced comprehensive new consolidating legislation that had the effect of implementing Wootton’s proposal.

== See also ==
- Advisory Council on the Misuse of Drugs
- Brain Committee
- Cannabis classification in the United Kingdom
- Rolleston Committee
