= Brain Committee =

The Interdepartmental Committee on Drug Addiction, commonly called the Brain Committee after its chairman Sir Russell Brain, was created by the Home Office in 1958 to consider issues related to drugs and drug addiction in the United Kingdom. The committee explored whether or not certain drugs should be considered addictive or habit-forming; examined whether there was a medical need to provide special, including institutional, treatment outside the resources already available, for persons addicted to drugs; and made recommendations, including proposals for administrative measures, to the Minister of Health and the Secretary of State for Scotland.

The committee produced two reports.

== The First Brain Report ==
The first report is also known as The Report of the Second Inter-departmental Committee on Drug Addiction, and it was published in 1961. It stated that the incidence of addiction to dangerous drugs in Great Britain was small. This was the same conclusion drawn by the previous committee, The Rolleston Committee, in 1926.

== The Second Brain Report ==
The second report was published in 1964. This report showed that there had been a significant rise in the incidence of addiction to heroin and cocaine, and that the main source of supply was a small number of overprescribing doctors. The Rolleston defined addiction as an individualised pathology, whilst the second Brain report explicitly described the condition as a socially infectious one. It recommended the establishment of special treatment centres, especially in the London area, where addicts could be isolated from the community and treated. These became known as Drug Dependency Units or DDUs.

== Evolution ==
A recommendation of the second committee was to set up a Standing Advisory Committee to keep under review the whole problem of drug dependence. This drew on evidence provided by doctors, and eventually they produced a report, the Wootton Report.
