= Heroin =

Opioid analgesic and recreational drug

Heroin INN: Diamorphine

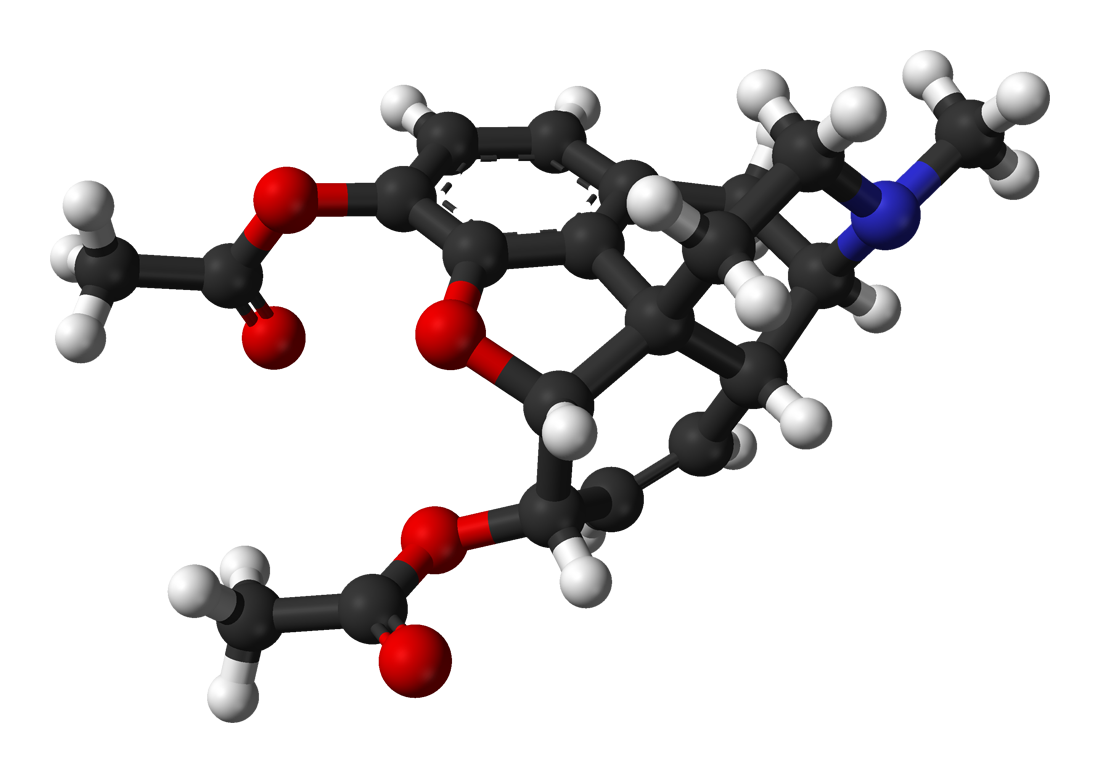

Clinical data
- Pronunciation: Heroin: /ˈhɛroʊɪn/
- Trade names: Diaphin
- Other names: Diacetylmorphine, acetomorphine, (dual) acetylated morphine, morphine diacetate, Diamorphine (BAN UK)
- AHFS/Drugs.com: heroin
- Dependence liability: Very high
- Addiction liability: Very high
- Routes of administration: Intravenous, inhalation, oromucosal, by mouth, intranasal, rectal, intramuscular, subcutaneous, intrathecal
- Drug class: Opioid
- ATC code: N07BC06 (WHO)

Legal status
- Legal status: AU: S9 (Prohibited substance); BR: Class F1 (Prohibited narcotics); CA: Schedule I; DE: Anlage I, II and III; NZ: Class A; UK: Class A; US: Schedule I; UN: Narcotic Schedules I and IV; SE: Förteckning I

Pharmacokinetic data
- Bioavailability: <35% (by mouth), 44–61% (inhalation)
- Protein binding: 0% (morphine metabolite 35%)
- Metabolism: Liver
- Metabolites: 6-Monoacetylmorphine, morphine
- Onset of action: Within minutes
- Elimination half-life: 2–3 minutes
- Duration of action: 4–5 hours
- Excretion: 90% kidney as glucuronides, rest bile duct

Identifiers
- IUPAC name: (5α,6α)-7,8-didehydro-4,5-epoxy-17-methylmorphinan-3,6-diol diacetate
- CAS Number: 561-27-3; HCl: 1502-95-0
- PubChem CID: 5462328
- DrugBank: DB01452
- ChemSpider: 4575379
- UNII: 70D95007SX; HCl: 8H672SHT8E
- KEGG: D07286
- ChEBI: CHEBI:27808
- ChEMBL: ChEMBL459324
- CompTox Dashboard (EPA): DTXSID6046761
- ECHA InfoCard: 100.008.380

Chemical and physical data
- Formula: C_{21}H_{23}NO_{5}
- Molar mass: 369.417 g·mol^{−1}
- 3D model (JSmol): Interactive image
- Solubility in water: 600 mg/L (at 25 °C) in water
- SMILES: CC(OC1=C(O[C@@H]2[C@]34CCN(C)[C@@H]([C@@H]4C=C[C@@H]2OC(C)=O)C5)C3=C5C=C1)=O
- InChI: InChI=1S/C21H23NO5/c1-11(23)25-16-6-4-13-10-15-14-5-7-17(26-12(2)24)20-21(14,8-9-22(15)3)18(13)19(16)27-20/h4-7,14-15,17,20H,8-10H2,1-3H3/t14-,15+,17-,20-,21-/m0/s1; Key:GVGLGOZIDCSQPN-PVHGPHFFSA-N

Heroin, also known as diacetylmorphine and diamorphine among other names, is a morphinan opioid substance synthesized from the dried latex of the opium poppy; it is mainly used as a recreational drug for its euphoric effects. Heroin is used medically in several countries to relieve pain, such as during childbirth or a heart attack. Medical-grade diamorphine is used as a pure hydrochloride salt. Various white and brown powders sold illegally around the world as heroin are routinely diluted with cutting agents. Black tar heroin is a variable admixture of morphine derivatives—predominantly 6-MAM (6-monoacetylmorphine), which is the result of crude acetylation during clandestine production of street heroin.

Heroin is typically injected, usually into a vein, but it can also be snorted, smoked, or inhaled. In a clinical context, the route of administration is most commonly intravenous injection; it may also be given by intramuscular or subcutaneous injection, as well as orally in the form of tablets. The onset of effects is usually rapid and lasts for a few hours.

Common side effects include respiratory depression (decreased breathing), dry mouth, drowsiness, impaired mental function, constipation, and addiction. Use by injection can also result in abscesses, infected heart valves, blood-borne infections, and pneumonia. After a history of long-term use, opioid withdrawal symptoms can begin within hours of the last use. When given by injection into a vein, heroin has two to three times the effect of a similar dose of morphine. It typically appears in the form of a white or brown powder.

Treatment of heroin addiction often includes behavioral therapy and medications. Medications can include buprenorphine, methadone, or naltrexone. A heroin overdose may be treated with naloxone.

As of 2015, an estimated 17 million people use opiates non-medically, of which heroin is the most common, and opioid use resulted in an estimated 109 thousand to 129 thousand deaths in 2015.

The total number of heroin users worldwide is believed to have increased in Africa, the Americas, and Asia between 2000 and 2015. In the United States, approximately 1.6 percent of people reported using heroin at some point in their lives and 0.4% of people aged 12 or older in 2021 reported using heroin in the past 12 months.

When people die from overdosing on a drug, the drug is usually an opioid and often heroin.

Heroin was first made by C. R. Alder Wright in 1874 from morphine, a natural product of the opium poppy. Internationally, heroin is controlled under Schedules I and IV of the Single Convention on Narcotic Drugs, and it is generally illegal to make, possess, or sell without a license. About 448 tons of heroin were made in 2016. In 2015, Afghanistan produced about 66% of the world's opium. Illegal heroin is often mixed with other substances such as sugar, starch, caffeine, quinine, or other opioids like fentanyl.

== Uses ==
=== Recreational ===
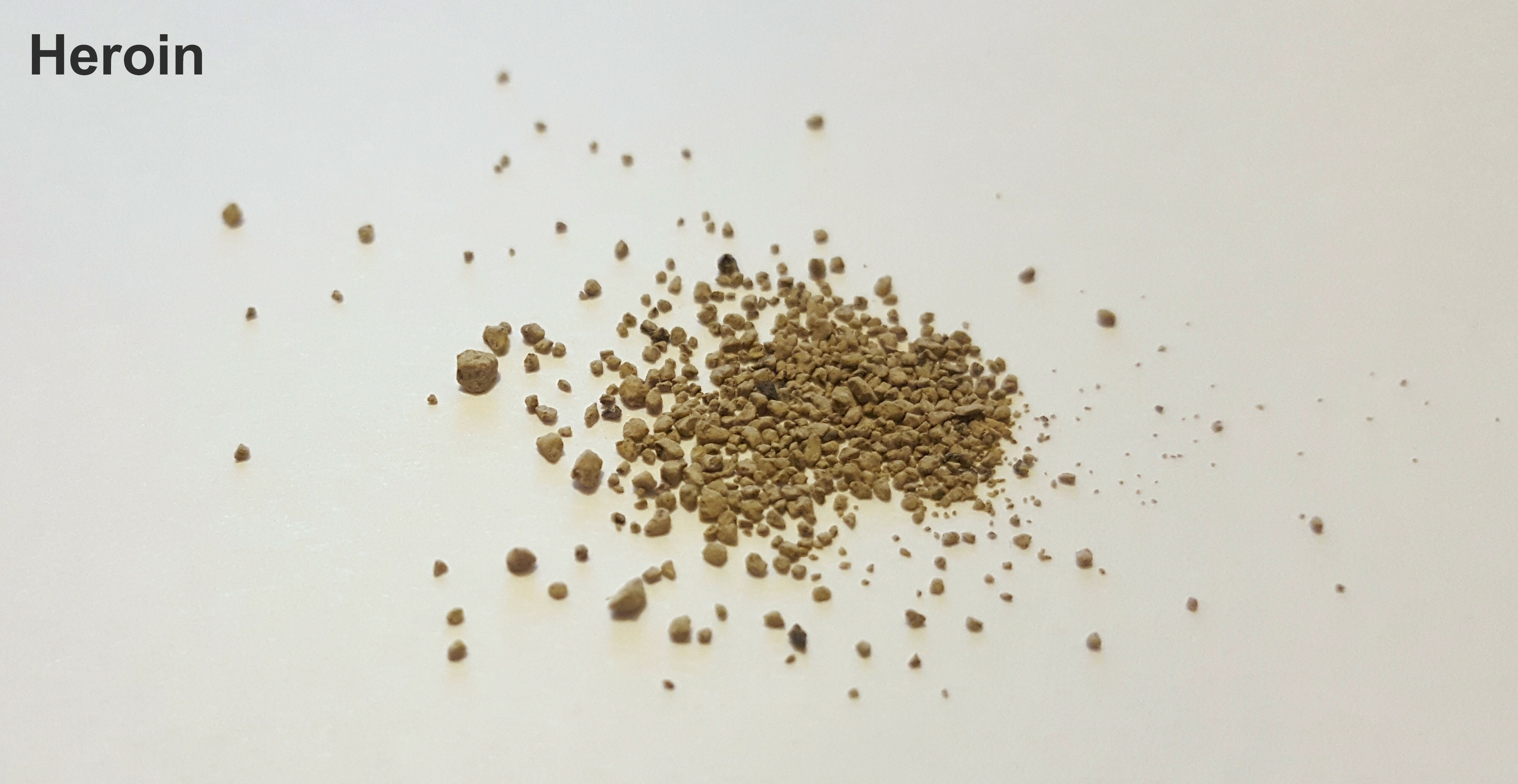
Sample of heroin powder

Bayer's original trade name of heroin is typically used in non-medical settings. It is used as a recreational drug for the euphoria it induces. Anthropologist Michael Agar once described heroin as "the perfect whatever drug." Tolerance develops quickly, and increased doses are needed in order to achieve the same effects. Its popularity with recreational drug users, compared to morphine, reportedly stems from its perceived different effects.

Short-term addiction studies by the same researchers demonstrated that tolerance to heroin and morphine developed at a similar rate. When compared to the opioids hydromorphone, fentanyl, oxycodone, and pethidine (meperidine), former addicts showed a strong preference for heroin and morphine, suggesting that heroin and morphine are particularly susceptible to misuse and causing dependence. Morphine and heroin were also much more likely to produce euphoria and other positive subjective effects when compared to these other opioids.

Heroin came into widespread use in South Africa in 2009 but the epidemic of heroin addiction has escalated since 2013 as prices have fallen rapidly in recent years. Heroin is primarily used by unemployed young men. Heroin generates intense feelings of euphoria, deep contentment, and relaxation. It also reduces appetite. Effects may last two to four hours. The drug can be inhaled after being warmed in a glass pipe but can be also smoked with cannabis in the form of a joint. It is primarily injected intravenously.

=== Medical uses ===
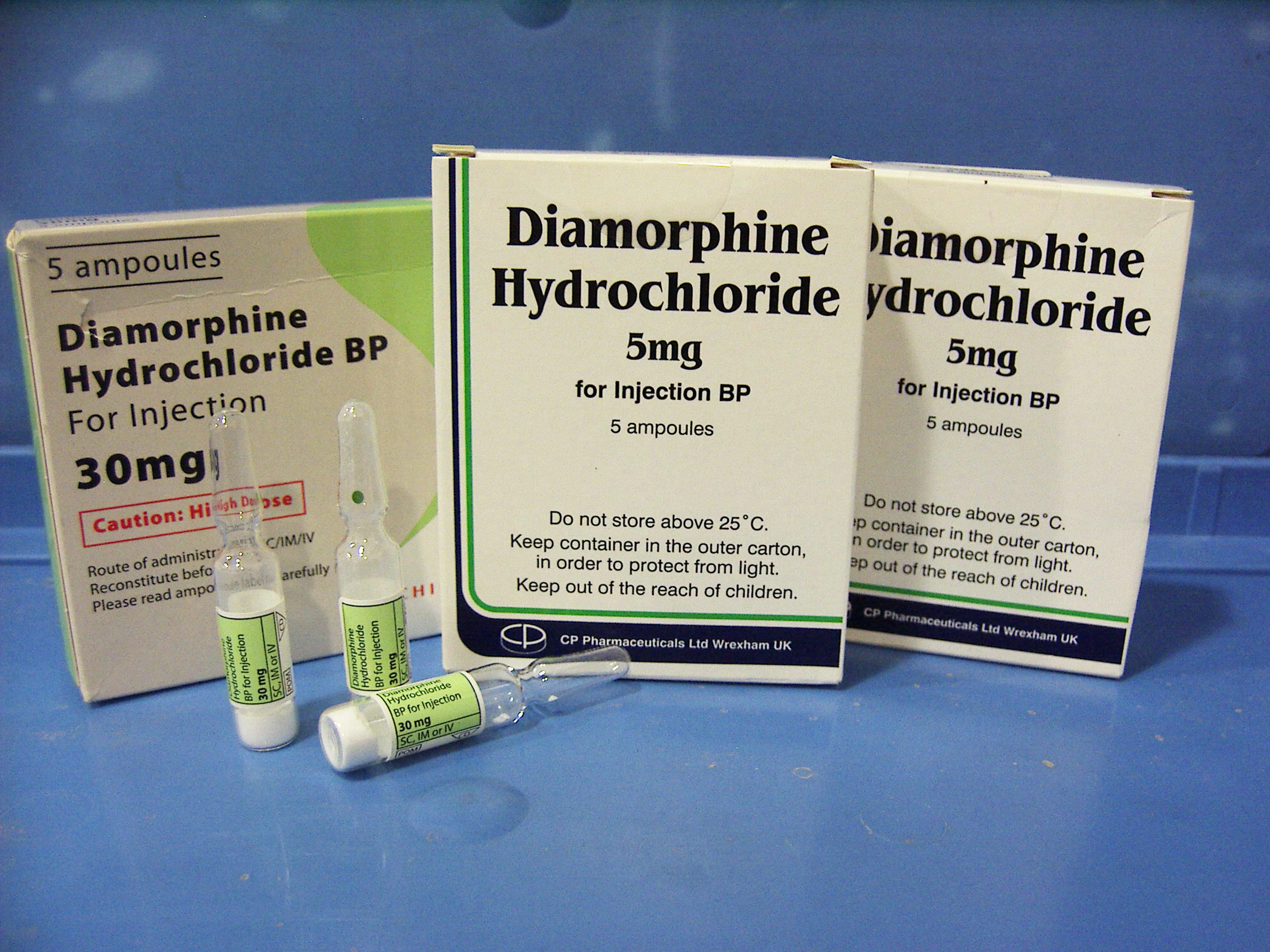
Ampoules of freeze-dried diamorphine (heroin) for medical use

In the United States, heroin is not accepted as medically useful. Its classification as a Schedule I drug means it has "no currently accepted medical use and a high potential for abuse."

Under the generic name diamorphine, heroin is prescribed as a strong pain medication in the United Kingdom, where it is administered via oral, subcutaneous, intramuscular, intrathecal, intranasal or intravenous routes. It may be prescribed for the treatment of acute pain, such as in severe physical trauma, myocardial infarction, post-surgical pain and chronic pain, including end-stage terminal illnesses. In other countries it is more common to use morphine or other strong opioids in these situations.

The UK's National Institute for Health and Clinical Excellence has produced guidance on the management of caesarean section, which recommends the use of intrathecal or epidural diamorphine for post-operative pain relief. For women who have had intrathecal opioids including diamorphine, there should be a minimum hourly observation of respiratory rate, sedation and pain scores for at least 12 hours if risk factors for respiratory depression are present. Women should be offered diamorphine (up to 0.3 mg intrathecally) for intra- and postoperative analgesia because it reduces the need for supplemental analgesia after a caesarean section. Epidural diamorphine (up to 3 mg) is a suitable alternative.

Diamorphine continues to be widely used in palliative care in the UK, where it is commonly given by the subcutaneous route, often via a syringe driver if patients cannot easily swallow morphine solution. The advantage of diamorphine over morphine is that diamorphine is more fat soluble and therefore more potent by injection, so smaller doses of it are needed for the same effect on pain. Both of these factors are advantageous if giving high doses of opioids via the subcutaneous route, which is often necessary for palliative care.

It is also used in the palliative management of bone fractures and other trauma, especially in children. In the trauma context, it is primarily given by nose in hospital; although a prepared nasal spray is available, it has traditionally been made by the attending physician, generally from the same "dry" ampoules as used for injection. In children, Ayendi nasal spray is available at 720 micrograms and 1600 micrograms per 50 microlitres actuation of the spray, which may be preferable as a non-invasive alternative in pediatric care, avoiding the fear of injection in children.

==== Maintenance therapy ====
A number of European countries prescribe heroin for treatment of heroin addiction. The initial Swiss HAT (heroin-assisted treatment) trial ("PROVE" study) was conducted as a prospective cohort study with some 1,000 participants in 18 treatment centers between 1994 and 1996. At the end of 2004, 1,200 patients were enrolled in HAT in 23 treatment centers across Switzerland. Diamorphine may be used as a maintenance drug to assist the treatment of opiate addiction, normally in long-term chronic intravenous (IV) heroin users. It is only prescribed following exhaustive efforts at treatment via other means. It is sometimes thought that heroin users can walk into a clinic and walk out with a prescription, but the process takes many weeks before a prescription for diamorphine is issued. Though this is somewhat controversial among proponents of a zero-tolerance drug policy, it has proven superior to methadone in improving the social and health situations of addicts.

The UK Department of Health's Rolleston Committee Report in 1926 established the British approach to diamorphine prescription to users, which was maintained for the next 40 years: dealers were prosecuted, but doctors could prescribe diamorphine to users when withdrawing. In 1964, the Brain Committee recommended that only selected approved doctors working at approved specialized centres be allowed to prescribe diamorphine and cocaine to users. The law was made more restrictive in 1968. Beginning in the 1970s, the emphasis shifted to abstinence and the use of methadone; currently, only a small number of users in the UK are prescribed diamorphine.

In 1994, Switzerland began a trial diamorphine maintenance program for users that had failed multiple withdrawal programs. The aim of this program was to maintain the health of the user by avoiding medical problems stemming from the illicit use of diamorphine. The first trial in 1994 involved 340 users, although enrollment was later expanded to 1000, based on the apparent success of the program. The trials proved diamorphine maintenance to be superior to other forms of treatment in improving the social and health situation for this group of patients. It has also been shown to save money, despite high treatment expenses, as it significantly reduces costs incurred by trials, incarceration, health interventions and delinquency. Patients appear twice daily at a treatment center, where they inject their dose of diamorphine under the supervision of medical staff. They are required to contribute about 450 Swiss francs per month to the treatment costs. A national referendum in November 2008 showed 68% of voters supported the plan, introducing diamorphine prescription into federal law. The previous trials were based on time-limited executive ordinances. The success of the Swiss trials led German, Dutch, and Canadian cities to try out their own diamorphine prescription programs. Some Australian cities (such as Sydney) have instituted legal diamorphine supervised injecting centers, in line with other wider harm minimization programs.

Since January 2009, Denmark has prescribed diamorphine to a few addicts who have tried methadone and buprenorphine without success. Beginning in February 2010, addicts in Copenhagen and Odense became eligible to receive free diamorphine. Later in 2010, other cities including Århus and Esbjerg joined the scheme. It was estimated that around 230 addicts would be able to receive free diamorphine.

However, Danish addicts would only be able to inject heroin according to the policy set by Danish National Board of Health. Of the estimated 1500 drug users who did not benefit from the then-current oral substitution treatment, approximately 900 would not be in the target group for treatment with injectable diamorphine, either because of "massive multiple drug abuse of non-opioids" or "not wanting treatment with injectable diamorphine".

In July 2009, the German Bundestag passed a law allowing diamorphine prescription as a standard treatment for addicts; a large-scale trial of diamorphine prescription had been authorized in the country in 2002.

On 26 August 2016, Health Canada issued regulations amending prior regulations it had issued under the Controlled Drugs and Substances Act; the "New Classes of Practitioners Regulations", the "Narcotic Control Regulations", and the "Food and Drug Regulations", to allow doctors to prescribe diamorphine to people who have a severe opioid addiction who have not responded to other treatments. The prescription heroin can be accessed by doctors through Health Canada's Special Access Programme (SAP) for "emergency access to drugs for patients with serious or life-threatening conditions when conventional treatments have failed, are unsuitable, or are unavailable."

== Routes of administration ==
Recreational uses:
- Euphoria

Medicinal uses:

- Pain medication
- Cough suppressant
- Anti-diarrheal
Contraindications:
- Ethanol (alcoholic beverages), isopropanol, 2M2B
- Barbiturates and benzodiazepines
- Stimulants
- Other opioids
Central nervous system:
- Drowsiness
- Disorientation
- Delirium

Neurological:

- Analgesia
- Tolerance
- Addiction
- Dependence

Psychological:

- Anxiolysis
- Confusion
- Euphoria
- Somnolence

Cardiovascular & Respiratory:

- Bradycardia
- Hypotension
- Hypoventilation
- Shallow breathing

Gastrointestinal:

- Nausea
- Protracted vomiting
- Constipation
- Dyspepsia (indigestion)

Musculoskeletal:

- Analgesia
- Ataxia
- Muscle spasticity

Skin:

- Itching
- Flushing/Rash

Miscellaneous:

- Dry mouth (xerostomia)
- Miosis (pupil constriction)
- Urinary retention

The onset of heroin's effects depends upon the route of administration. Smoking is the fastest route of drug administration, although intravenous injection results in a quicker rise in blood concentration. These are followed by suppository (anal or vaginal insertion), insufflation (snorting), and ingestion (swallowing).

A 2002 study suggests that a fast onset of action increases the reinforcing effects of addictive drugs. Ingestion does not produce a rush as a forerunner to the high experienced with the use of heroin, which is most pronounced with intravenous use. While the onset of the rush induced by injection can occur in as little as a few seconds, the oral route of administration requires approximately half an hour before the high sets in. Thus, with both higher the dosage of heroin used and faster the route of administration used, the higher the potential risk for psychological dependence/addiction.

Large doses of heroin can cause fatal respiratory depression and the drug has been used for the purposes of suicide and homicide. The serial killer Harold Shipman used diamorphine on his victims, and the subsequent Shipman Inquiry led to a tightening of the regulations surrounding the storage, prescribing and destruction of controlled drugs in the UK.

Because significant tolerance to respiratory depression develops quickly with continued use and is lost just as quickly during withdrawal, it is often difficult to determine whether a heroin lethal overdose was accidental, suicide or homicide. Examples include the overdose deaths of Sid Vicious, Janis Joplin, Tim Buckley, Hillel Slovak, Layne Staley, Bradley Nowell, Ted Binion, and River Phoenix.

=== By mouth ===
Use of heroin by mouth is less common than other methods of administration, mainly because there is little to no "rush", and the effects are less potent. Heroin is entirely converted to morphine by means of first-pass metabolism, resulting in deacetylation when ingested. Heroin's oral bioavailability is both dose-dependent (as is morphine's) and significantly higher than oral use of morphine itself, reaching up to 64.2% for high doses and 45.6% for low doses; opiate-naive users showed far less absorption of the drug at low doses, having bioavailabilities of only up to 22.9%. The maximum plasma concentration of morphine following oral administration of heroin was around twice as much as that of oral morphine.

=== Injection ===
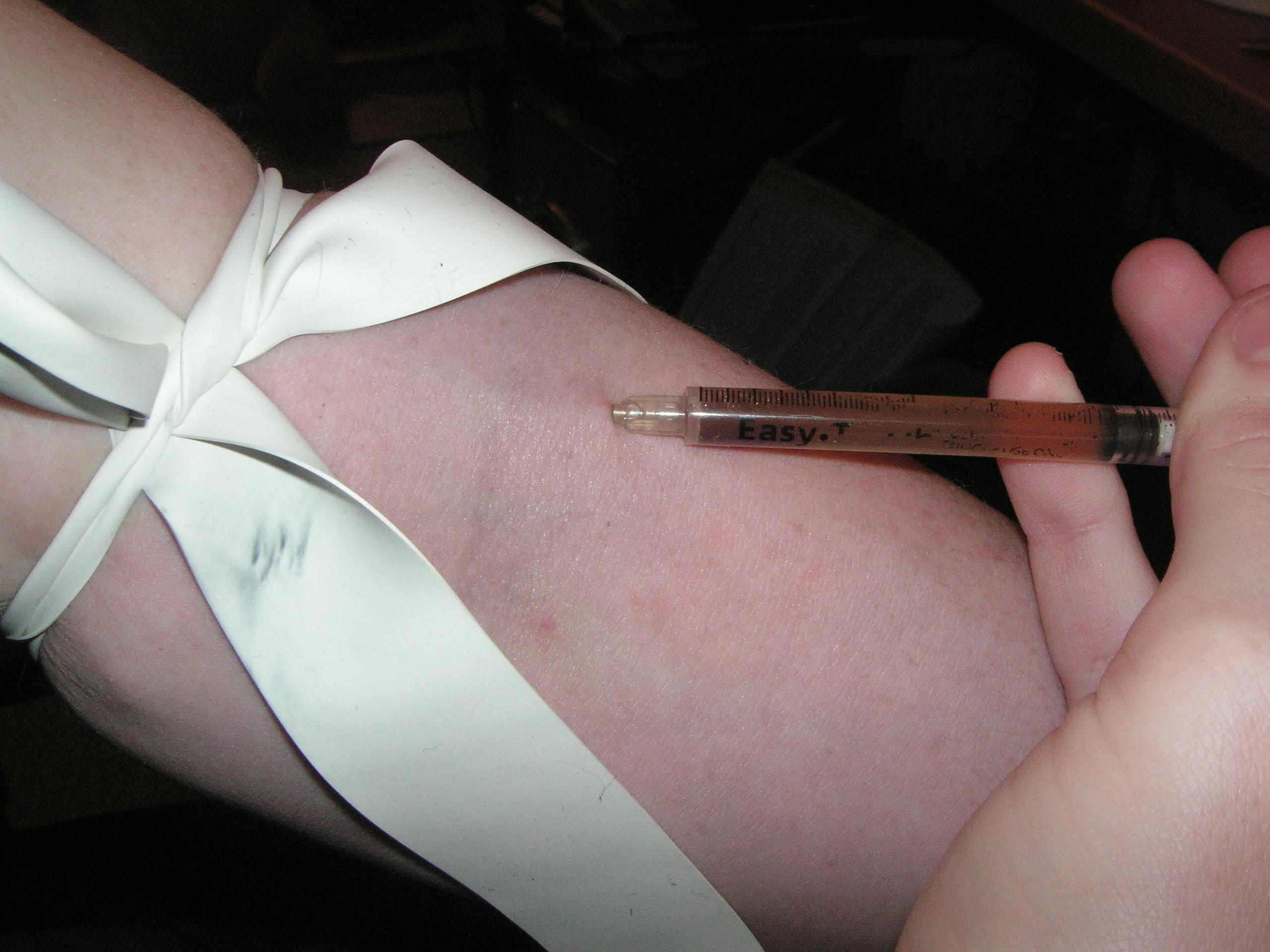
Heroin solution injected after being filtered through cotton from a tampon

Injection, also known as "slamming", "banging", "shooting up", "digging" or "mainlining", is a popular method which carries relatively greater risks than other methods of administration. Heroin base (commonly found in Europe), when prepared for injection, will only dissolve in water when mixed with an acid (most commonly citric acid powder or lemon juice) and heated. Heroin in the east-coast United States is most commonly found in the hydrochloride salt form, requiring just water (and no heat) to dissolve. Users tend to initially inject in the easily accessible arm veins, but as these veins collapse over time, users resort to more dangerous areas of the body, such as the femoral vein in the groin. Some medical professionals have expressed concern over this route of administration, as they suspect that it can lead to deep vein thrombosis.

Intravenous users can use a variable single dose range using a hypodermic needle. The dose of heroin used for recreational purposes is dependent on the frequency and level of use.

As with the injection of any drug, if a group of users share a common needle without sterilization procedures, blood-borne diseases, such as HIV/AIDS or hepatitis, can be transmitted. The use of a common dispenser for water for the use in the preparation of the injection, as well as the sharing of spoons and filters can also cause the spread of blood-borne diseases. Many countries now supply small sterile spoons and filters for single use in order to prevent the spread of disease.

Heroin for the purposes of pain relief involves administration using a syringe with a nebulizer tip by a physician. Heroin may be used for fractures, burns, finger-tip injuries, suturing, and wound re-dressing, but is inappropriate in head injuries.

=== Smoking ===
Smoking heroin refers to vaporizing it to inhale the resulting fumes, rather than burning and inhaling the smoke. It is commonly smoked in glass pipes made from glassblown Pyrex tubes and light bulbs. Heroin may be smoked from aluminium foil that is heated by a flame underneath it, with the resulting smoke inhaled through a tube of rolled up foil, a method also known as "chasing the dragon".

=== Insufflation ===
Another popular route to intake heroin is insufflation (snorting), where a user crushes the heroin into a fine powder and then gently inhales it (sometimes with a straw or a rolled-up banknote, as with cocaine) into the nose, where heroin is absorbed through the soft tissue in the mucous membrane of the sinus cavity and straight into the bloodstream. This method of administration redirects first-pass metabolism, with a quicker onset and higher bioavailability than oral administration, though the duration of action is shortened. This method is sometimes preferred by users who do not want to prepare and administer heroin for injection or smoking but still want to experience a fast onset. Snorting heroin becomes an often unwanted route once a user begins to inject the drug; a user may still get high on the drug from snorting and experience a nod, but will not get a rush because the drug is absorbed slowly rather than instantly.

=== Suppository ===
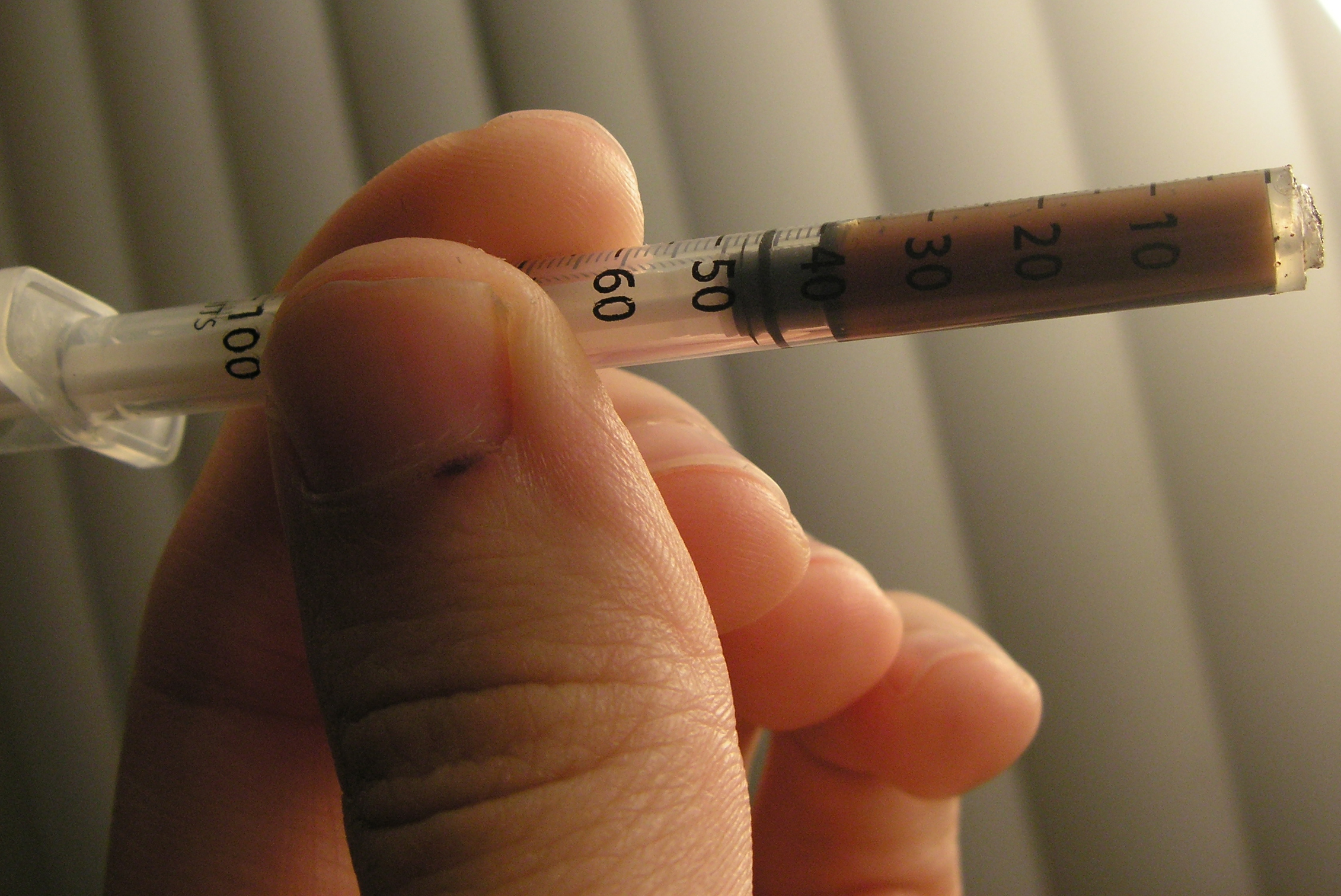
A modified hypodermic syringe used for rectal administration ("plugging") of heroin.

Little research has been focused on the suppository (anal insertion), also known as "plugging" or "boofing". These methods of administration are commonly carried out using an oral syringe. Heroin can be dissolved and withdrawn into an oral syringe which may then be lubricated and inserted into the anus or vagina before the plunger is pushed. The rectum or the vaginal canal is where the majority of the drug would likely be taken up, through the membranes lining their walls.

== Adverse effects ==
A 2010 study ranking various illegal and legal drugs based on statements by drug-harm experts. Heroin was found to be the second overall most dangerous drug.

=== Short-term effects ===
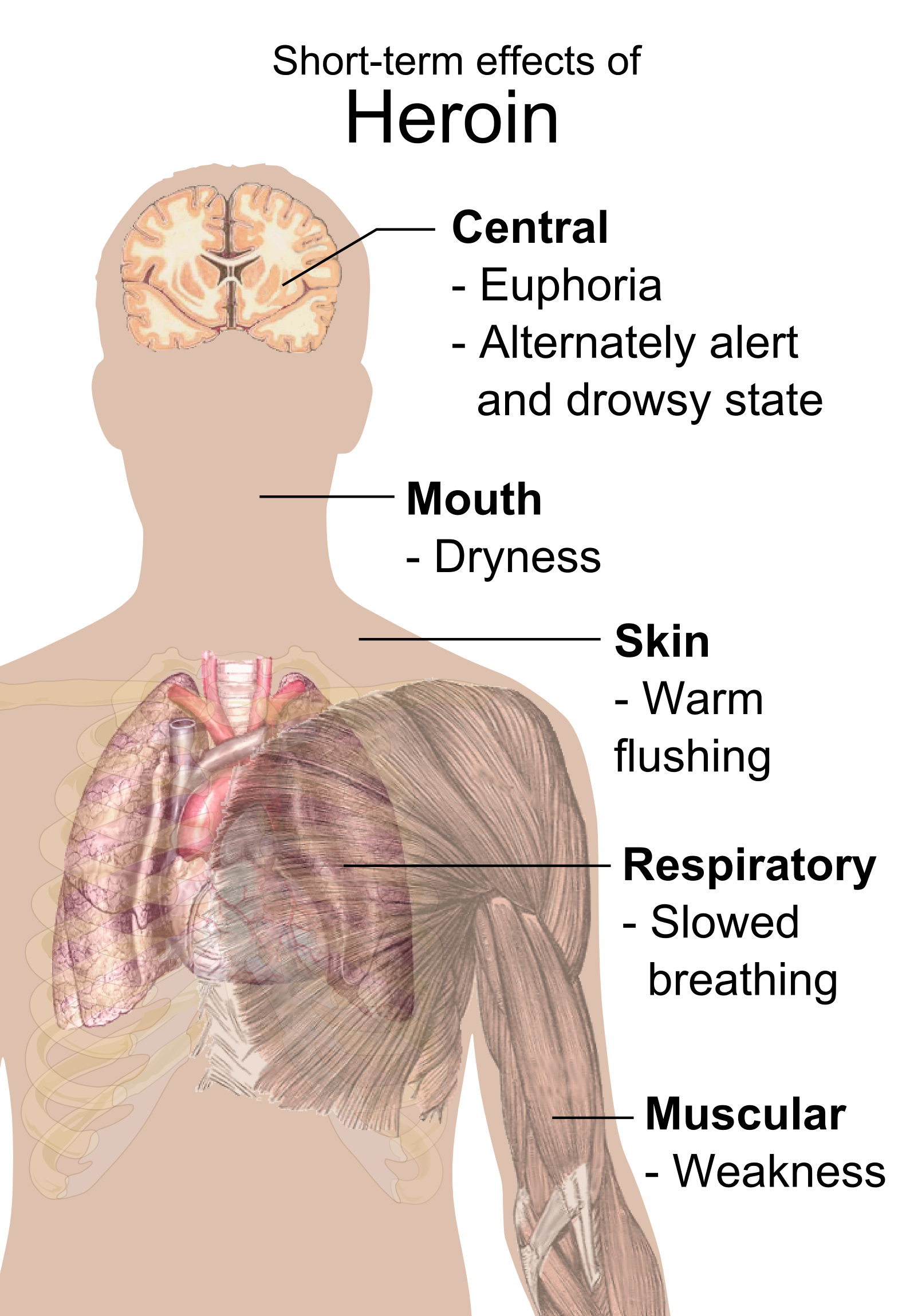
Short-term effects of usage

Users report an intense rush, an acute transcendent state of euphoria, which occurs while diamorphine is being metabolized into 6-monoacetylmorphine (6-MAM) and morphine in the brain. Some believe that heroin produces more euphoria than other opioids; one possible explanation is the presence of 6-monoacetylmorphine, a metabolite unique to heroin – although a more likely explanation is the rapidity of onset. While other opioids of recreational use produce only morphine, heroin also leaves 6-MAM, also a psycho-active metabolite.

However, this perception is not supported by the results of clinical studies comparing the physiological and subjective effects of injected heroin and morphine in individuals formerly addicted to opioids; these subjects showed no preference for one drug over the other. Equipotent injected doses had comparable action courses, with no difference in subjects' self-rated feelings of euphoria, ambition, nervousness, relaxation, drowsiness, or sleepiness.

The rush is usually accompanied by a warm flushing of the skin, dry mouth, and a heavy feeling in the extremities. Nausea, vomiting, and severe itching may also occur. After the initial effects, users usually will be drowsy for several hours; mental function is clouded; heart function slows, and breathing is also severely slowed, sometimes enough to be life-threatening. Slowed breathing can also lead to coma and permanent brain damage. Heroin use has also been associated with myocardial infarction.

=== Long-term effects ===
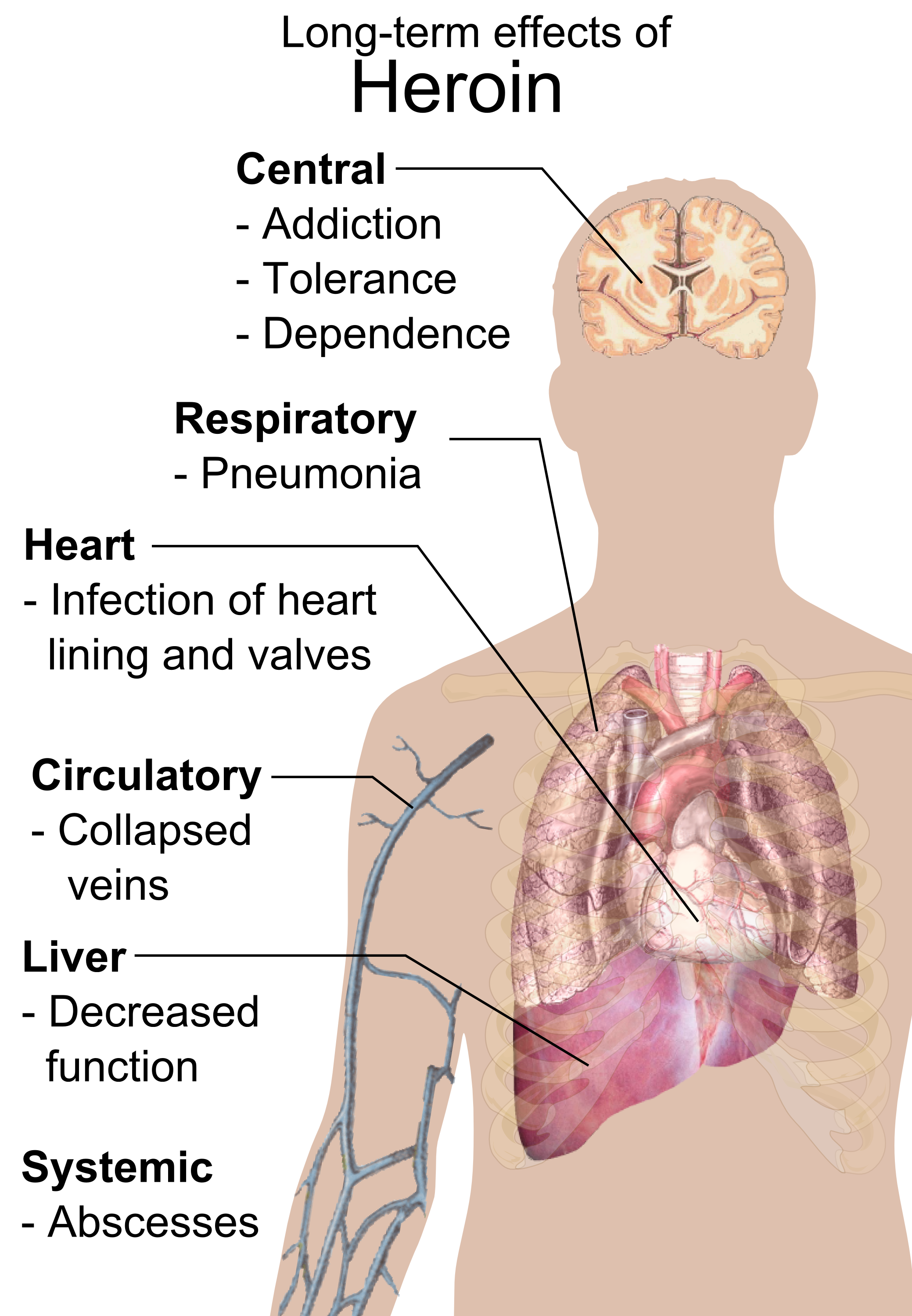
Long-term effects of intravenous usage, including – and indeed primarily because of – the effects of the contaminants common in illegal heroin and contaminated needles

Repeated heroin use changes the physical structure and physiology of the brain, creating long-term imbalances in neuronal and hormonal systems that are not easily reversed. Studies have shown some deterioration of the brain's white matter due to heroin use, which may affect decision-making abilities, the ability to regulate behavior, and responses to stressful situations. Heroin also produces profound degrees of tolerance and physical dependence. Tolerance occurs when more and more of the drug is required to achieve the same effects. With physical dependence, the body adapts to the presence of the drug, and withdrawal symptoms occur if use is reduced abruptly.

=== Injection ===
Intravenous use of heroin (and any other substance) with needles and syringes or other related equipment may lead to:

- Contracting blood-borne pathogens such as HIV and hepatitis via the sharing of needles
- Contracting bacterial or fungal endocarditis and possibly venous sclerosis
- Abscesses
- Poisoning from contaminants added to "cut" or dilute heroin
- Decreased kidney function (nephropathy), although it is not currently known if this is because of adulterants or infectious diseases

=== Smoking ===
Inhaling heroin appears to rarely lead to toxic leukoencephalopathy. There are also documented cases of both severe acute asthma and exacerbation of underlying asthma caused by heroin inhalation, potentially resulting in death.

=== Withdrawal ===
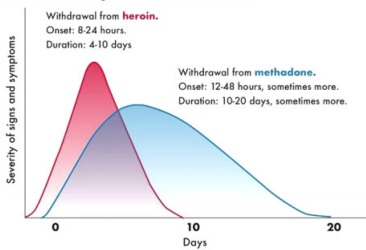
Course of opioid withdrawal

The withdrawal syndrome from heroin may begin within as little as two hours of discontinuation of the drug; however, this time frame can fluctuate with the degree of tolerance as well as the amount of the last consumed dose, and more typically begins within 6–24 hours after cessation. Symptoms may include sweating, malaise, anxiety, depression, akathisia, priapism, extra sensitivity of the genitals in females, general feeling of heaviness, excessive yawning or sneezing, rhinorrhea, insomnia, cold sweats, chills, severe muscle and bone aches, nausea, vomiting, diarrhea, cramps, watery eyes, fever, cramp-like pains, and involuntary spasms in the limbs (thought to be an origin of the term "kicking the habit").

== Overdose ==
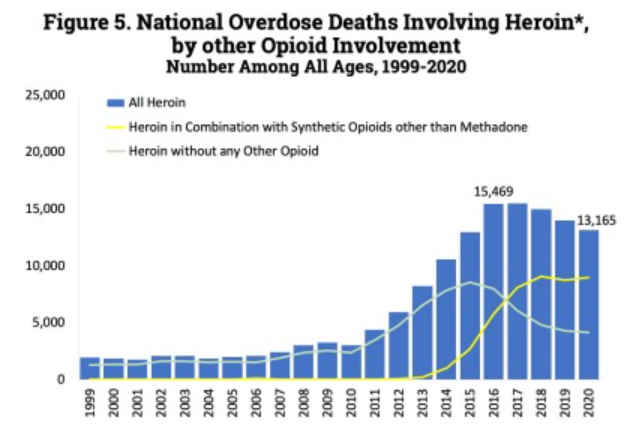
US yearly opioid overdose deaths involving heroin

Heroin overdose is usually treated with the opioid antagonist naloxone. This reverses the effects of heroin and causes an immediate return of consciousness but may result in withdrawal symptoms. The half-life of naloxone is shorter than some opioids, such that it may need to be given multiple times until the opioid has been metabolized by the body.

Between 2012 and 2015, heroin was the leading cause of drug-related deaths in the United States. Since then, fentanyl has been a more common cause of drug-related deaths.

Depending on drug interactions and numerous other factors, death from overdose can take anywhere from several minutes to several hours. Death usually occurs due to lack of oxygen resulting from the lack of breathing caused by the opioid. Heroin overdoses can occur because of an unexpected increase in the dose or purity or because of diminished opioid tolerance. However, many fatalities reported as overdoses are probably caused by interactions with other depressant drugs such as alcohol or benzodiazepines. Since heroin can cause nausea and vomiting, a significant number of deaths attributed to heroin overdose are caused by aspiration of vomit by an unconscious person. Some sources quote the median lethal dose (for an average 75 kg opiate-naive individual) as being between 75 and 600 mg. Illicit heroin is of widely varying and unpredictable purity. This means that the user may prepare what they consider to be a moderate dose while actually taking far more than intended. Also, tolerance typically decreases after a period of abstinence. If this occurs and the user takes a dose comparable to their previous use, the user may experience drug effects that are much greater than expected, potentially resulting in an overdose. It has been speculated that an unknown portion of heroin-related deaths are the result of an overdose or allergic reaction to quinine, which may sometimes be used as a cutting agent.

== Rehabs ==
While there are many rehabilitation centres for wealthy people struggling with addiction in South Africa there are very few facilities for the poor. Some have argued that people struggling with heroin addiction are treated as the 'undeserving poor' and subject to policing rather than medical interventions. In the populous province of KwaZulu-Natal there are only two government rehab centres accessible by poor people.

== Pharmacology ==
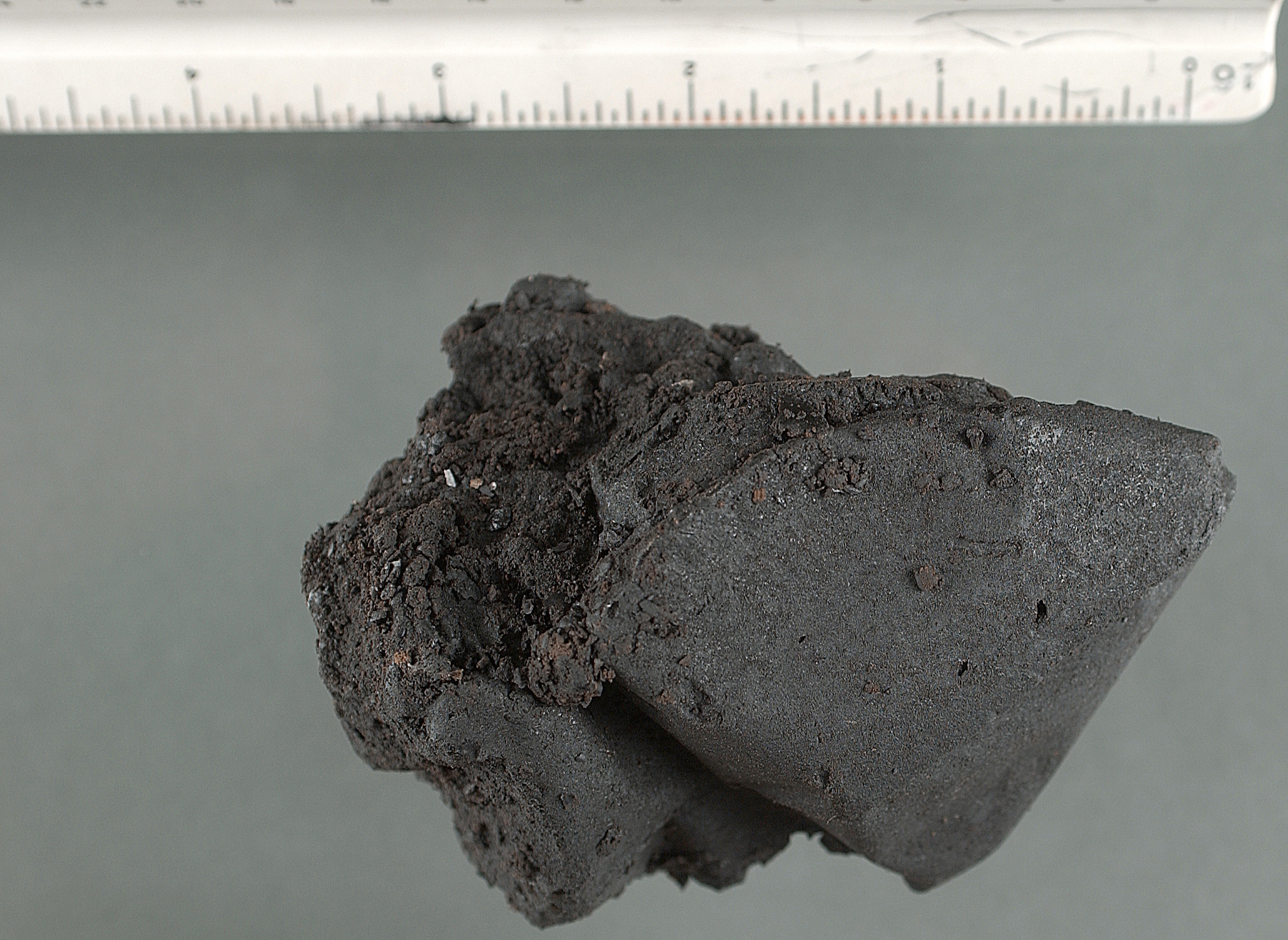
Black tar heroin

When taken orally, heroin undergoes extensive first-pass metabolism via deacetylation, making it a prodrug for the systemic delivery of morphine. When the drug is injected, however, it avoids this first-pass effect, very rapidly crossing the blood–brain barrier because of the presence of the acetyl groups, which render it much more fat soluble than morphine itself. Once in the brain, it then is deacetylated variously into the inactive 3-monoacetylmorphine and the active 6-monoacetylmorphine (6-MAM), and then to morphine, which bind to μ-opioid receptors, resulting in the drug's euphoric, analgesic (pain relief), and anxiolytic (anti-anxiety) effects; heroin itself exhibits relatively low affinity for the μ receptor. Analgesia follows from the activation of the μ receptor G-protein coupled receptor, which indirectly hyperpolarizes the neuron, reducing the release of nociceptive neurotransmitters, and hence, causes analgesia and increased pain tolerance.

Unlike hydromorphone and oxymorphone, however, administered intravenously, heroin creates a larger histamine release, similar to morphine, resulting in the feeling of a greater subjective "body high" to some, but also instances of pruritus (itching) when they first start using.

Normally, GABA, which is released from inhibitory neurones, inhibits the release of dopamine. Opiates, like heroin and morphine, decrease the inhibitory activity of such neurones. This causes increased release of dopamine in the brain which is the reason for euphoric and rewarding effects of heroin.

Both morphine and 6-MAM are μ-opioid agonists that bind to receptors present throughout the brain, spinal cord, and gut of all mammals. The μ-opioid receptor also binds endogenous opioid peptides such as β-endorphin, leu-enkephalin, and met-enkephalin. Repeated use of heroin results in a number of physiological changes, including an increase in the production of μ-opioid receptors (upregulation). These physiological alterations lead to tolerance and dependence, so that stopping heroin use results in uncomfortable symptoms including pain, anxiety, muscle spasms, and insomnia called the opioid withdrawal syndrome. Depending on usage it has an onset 4–24 hours after the last dose of heroin. Morphine also binds to δ- and κ-opioid receptors.

There is also evidence that 6-MAM binds to a subtype of μ-opioid receptors that are also activated by the morphine metabolite morphine-6β-glucuronide but not morphine itself. The third subtype of third opioid type is the mu-3 receptor, which may be a commonality to other six-position monoesters of morphine. The contribution of these receptors to the overall pharmacology of heroin remains unknown.

A subclass of morphine derivatives, namely the 3,6 esters of morphine, with similar effects and uses, includes the clinically used strong analgesics nicomorphine (Vilan), and dipropanoylmorphine; there is also the latter's dihydromorphine analogue, diacetyldihydromorphine (Paralaudin). Two other 3,6 diesters of morphine invented in 1874–75 along with diamorphine, dibenzoylmorphine and acetylpropionylmorphine, were made as substitutes after it was outlawed in 1925 and, therefore, sold as the first "designer drugs" until they were outlawed by the League of Nations in 1930.

== Chemistry ==
Acetylation of morphine

Diamorphine is produced from acetylation of morphine derived from natural opium sources, generally using acetic anhydride.

The major metabolites of diamorphine, 6-MAM, morphine, morphine-3-glucuronide, and morphine-6-glucuronide, may be quantitated in blood, plasma or urine to monitor for use, confirm a diagnosis of poisoning, or assist in a medicolegal death investigation. Most commercial opiate screening tests cross-react appreciably with these metabolites, as well as with other biotransformation products likely to be present following usage of street-grade diamorphine such as 6-Monoacetylcodeine and codeine. However, chromatographic techniques can easily distinguish and measure each of these substances. When interpreting the results of a test, it is important to consider the diamorphine usage history of the individual, since a chronic user can develop tolerance to doses that would incapacitate an opiate-naive individual, and the chronic user often has high baseline values of these metabolites in his system. Furthermore, some testing procedures employ a hydrolysis step before quantitation that converts many of the metabolic products to morphine, yielding a result that may be 2 times larger than with a method that examines each product individually.

== History ==
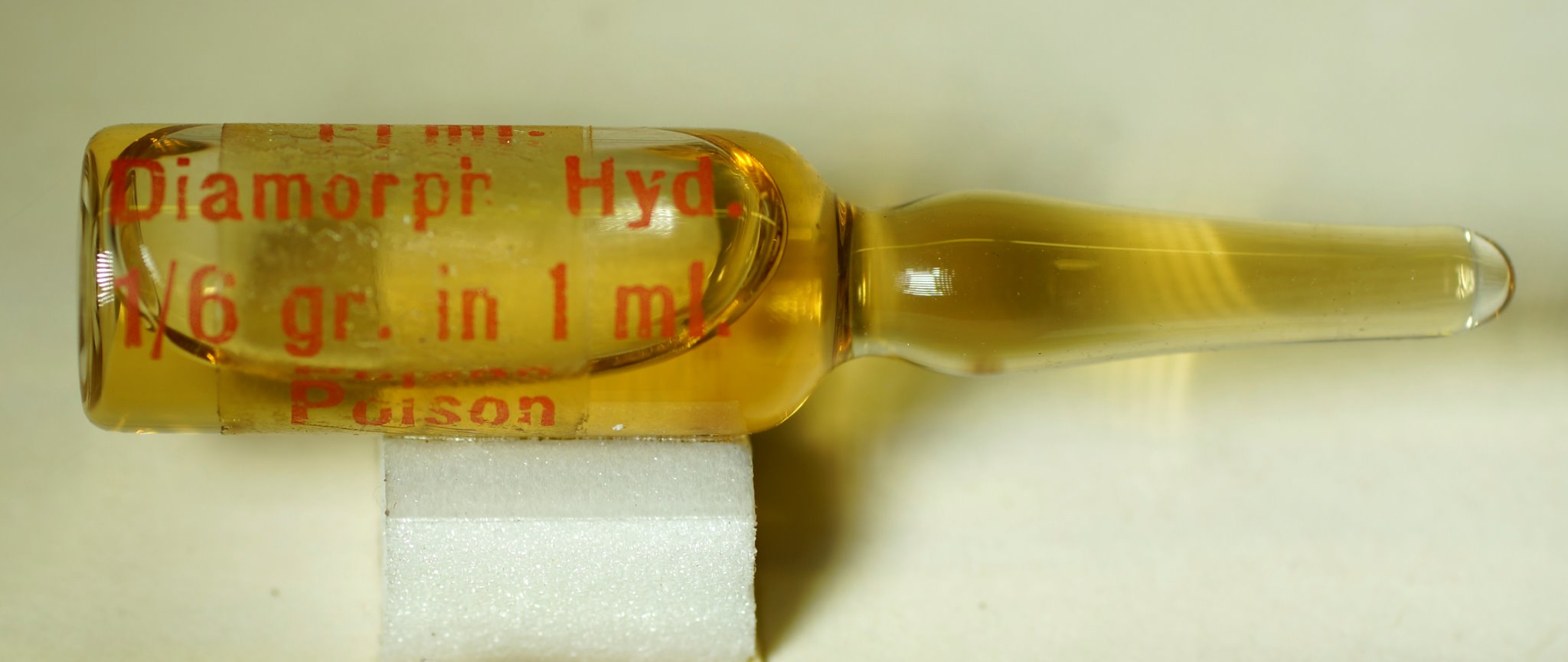
Photo from the West Midlands Police Museum showing an ampoule containing pharmaceutical liquid heroin

The opium poppy was cultivated in lower Mesopotamia as long ago as 3400 BC. The chemical analysis of opium in the 19th century revealed that most of its activity could be ascribed to the alkaloids codeine and morphine.

Diamorphine was first synthesized in 1874 by C. R. Alder Wright, an English chemist working at St. Mary's Hospital Medical School in London who had been experimenting combining morphine with various acids. He boiled anhydrous morphine alkaloid with acetic anhydride for several hours and produced a more potent, acetylated form of morphine which is now called diacetylmorphine or morphine diacetate. He sent the compound to F. M. Pierce of Owens College in Manchester for analysis. Pierce told Wright:

Doses… were subcutaneously injected into young dogs and rabbit… with the following general results… great prostration, fear, and sleepiness speedily following the administration, the eyes being sensitive, and pupils constrict, considerable salivation being produced in dogs, and a slight tendency to vomiting in some cases, but no actual emesis. Respiration was at first quickened, but subsequently reduced, and the heart's action was diminished and rendered irregular. Marked want of coordinating power over the muscular movements, and loss of power in the pelvis and hind limbs, together with a diminution of temperature in the rectum of about 4°.

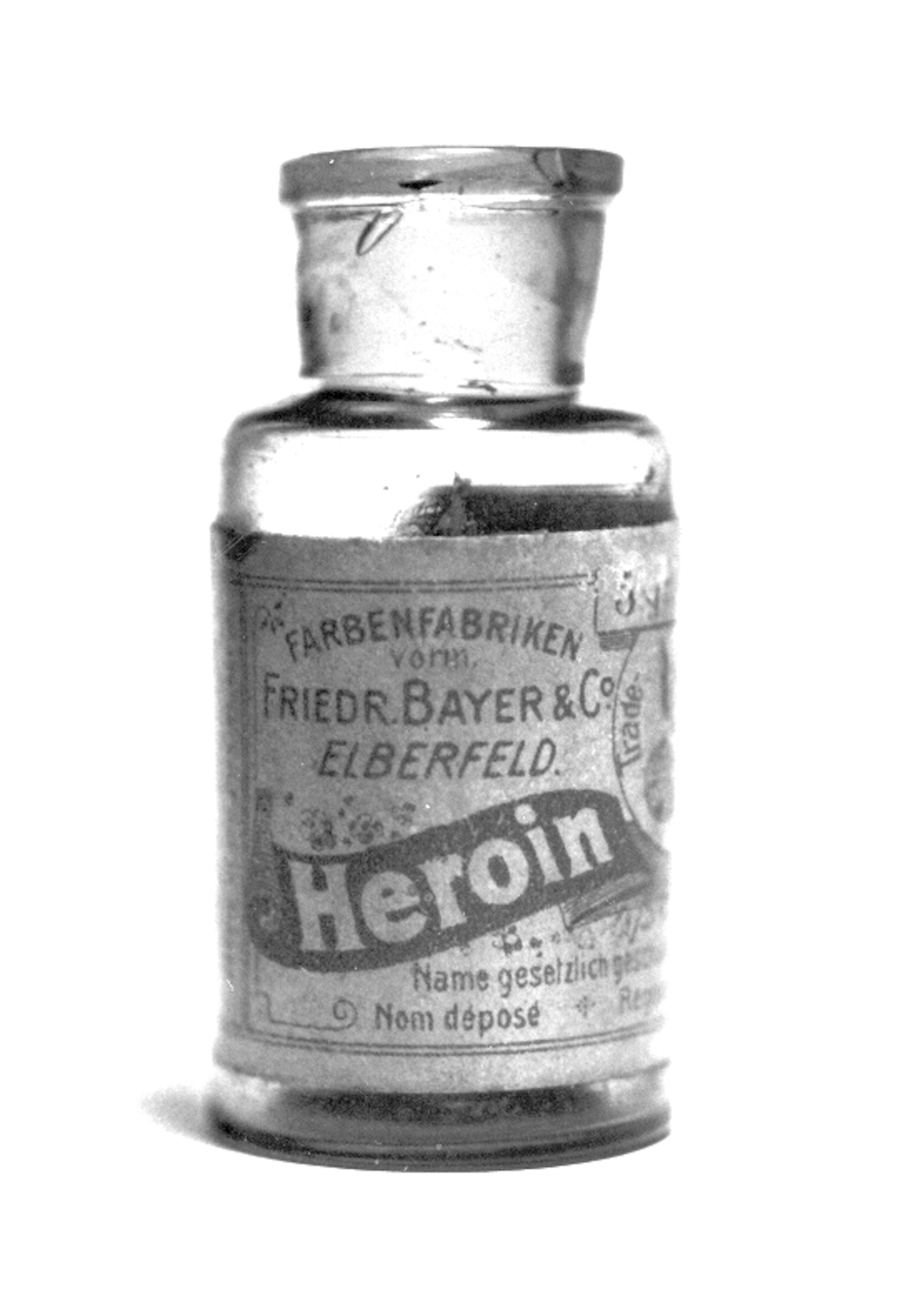
Bayer Heroin bottle

Wright's invention did not lead to any further developments, and diamorphine became popular only after it was independently re-synthesized 23 years later by chemist Felix Hoffmann. Hoffmann was working at Bayer pharmaceutical company in Elberfeld, Germany, and his supervisor Heinrich Dreser instructed him to acetylate morphine with the objective of producing codeine, a constituent of the opium poppy that is pharmacologically similar to morphine but less potent and less addictive. Instead, the experiment produced an acetylated form of morphine one and a half to two times more potent than morphine itself. Hoffmann synthesized heroin on 21 August 1897, just eleven days after he had synthesized aspirin.

The head of Bayer's research department reputedly coined the drug's new name of "heroin", based on the German heroisch which means "heroic, strong" (from the ancient Greek word "heros, ήρως"). Bayer scientists were not the first to make heroin, but their scientists discovered ways to make it, and Bayer led the commercialization of heroin.

Bayer marketed diacetylmorphine as an over-the-counter drug under the trademark name Heroin. It was developed chiefly as a morphine substitute for cough suppressants that did not have morphine's addictive side-effects. Morphine at the time was a popular recreational drug, and Bayer wished to find a similar but non-addictive substitute to market. However, contrary to Bayer's advertising as a "non-addictive morphine substitute", heroin would soon have one of the highest rates of addiction among its users.

From 1898 through to 1910, diamorphine was marketed under the trademark name Heroin as a non-addictive morphine substitute and cough suppressant. In the 11th edition of Encyclopædia Britannica (1910), the article on morphine states: "In the cough of phthisis minute doses [of morphine] are of service, but in this particular disease morphine is frequently better replaced by codeine or by heroin, which checks irritable coughs without the narcotism following upon the administration of morphine."

In the US, the Harrison Narcotics Tax Act was passed in 1914 to control the sale and distribution of diacetylmorphine and other opioids, which allowed the drug to be prescribed and sold for medical purposes. In 1924, the United States Congress banned its sale, importation, or manufacture. It is now a Schedule I substance, which makes it illegal for non-medical use in signatory nations of the Single Convention on Narcotic Drugs treaty, including the United States.

The Health Committee of the League of Nations banned diacetylmorphine in 1925, although it took more than three years for this to be implemented. In the meantime, the first designer drugs, viz. 3,6 diesters and 6 monoesters of morphine and acetylated analogues of closely related drugs like hydromorphone and dihydromorphine, were produced in massive quantities to fill the worldwide demand for diacetylmorphine—this continued until 1930 when the Committee banned diacetylmorphine analogues with no therapeutic advantage over drugs already in use, the first major legislation of this type.

Bayer lost some of its trademark rights to heroin (as well as aspirin) under the 1919 Treaty of Versailles following the German defeat in World War I.

Use of heroin by jazz musicians in particular was prevalent in the mid-twentieth century, including Billie Holiday, saxophonists Charlie Parker, John Coltrane and Art Pepper, trumpeter and vocalist Chet Baker, guitarist Joe Pass and piano player/singer Ray Charles; a "staggering number of jazz musicians were addicts". It was also a problem with many rock musicians, particularly from the late 1960s through the 1990s. Pete Doherty is also a self-confessed user of heroin. Nirvana lead singer Kurt Cobain's heroin addiction was well documented. Pantera frontman Phil Anselmo turned to heroin while touring during the 1990s to cope with his back pain. Lou Reed's heroin addiction is well known and evident by the many references to the drug in his songs. James Taylor, Taylor Hawkins, Jimmy Page, John Lennon, Eric Clapton, Johnny Winter, Keith Richards, Shaun Ryder, Shane MacGowan and Janis Joplin also used heroin. Many musicians have made songs referencing their heroin usage.

== Society and culture ==
=== Names ===
Diamorphine is the international nonproprietary name and the British Approved Name. Other synonyms for heroin include: diacetylmorphine, and morphine diacetate. Heroin is also known by many street names including Big H, Black Tar, Chiva, Hell Dust, Horse, Negra, Smack, Thunder, dope, H, smack, junk, skag, brown, and unga among others.

Whoonga (or wonga), nyaope and sugars are South African street names for heroin.

=== Legal status ===
==== Asia ====
In Hong Kong, diamorphine is regulated under Schedule 1 of Hong Kong's Chapter 134 Dangerous Drugs Ordinance. It is available by prescription. Anyone supplying diamorphine without a valid prescription can be fined $5,000,000 (HKD) and imprisoned for life. The penalty for trafficking or manufacturing diamorphine is a $5,000,000 (HKD) fine and life imprisonment. Possession of diamorphine without a license from the Department of Health is illegal with a $1,000,000 (HKD) fine and seven years of jail time.

==== Europe ====
In the Netherlands, diamorphine is a List I drug of the Opium Law. It is available for prescription under tight regulation exclusively to long-term addicts for whom methadone maintenance treatment has failed. It cannot be used to treat severe pain or other illnesses.

In the United Kingdom, diamorphine is available by prescription, though it is a restricted Class A drug. According to the 50th edition of the British National Formulary (BNF), diamorphine hydrochloride may be used in the treatment of acute pain, myocardial infarction, acute pulmonary oedema, and chronic pain. The treatment of chronic non-malignant pain must be supervised by a specialist. The BNF notes that all opioid analgesics cause dependence and tolerance but that this is "no deterrent in the control of pain in terminal illness". When used in the palliative care of cancer patients, diamorphine is often injected using a syringe driver.

In Switzerland, heroin is produced in injectable or tablet form under the brand name Diaphin by a private company under contract to the Swiss government. Swiss-produced heroin has been imported into Canada with government approval.

==== Australia ====
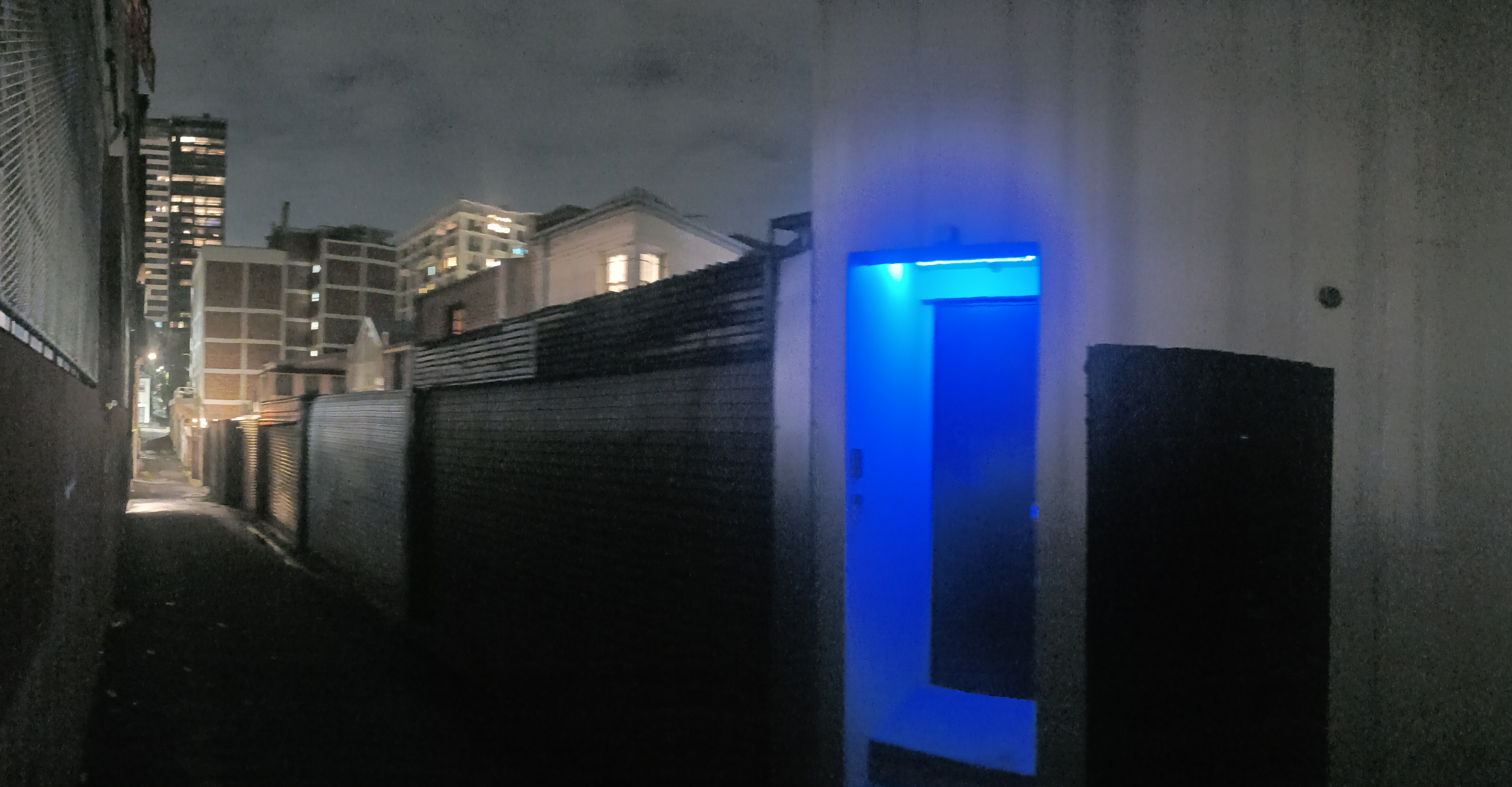
A laneway in Darlinghurst, Sydney with a blue light to prevent intravenous drug use. 2026.

In Australia, diamorphine is listed as a schedule 9 prohibited substance under the Poisons Standard (October 2015). The state of Western Australia, in its Poisons Act 1964 (Reprint 6: amendments as at 10 September 2004), described a schedule 9 drug as: "Poisons that are drugs of abuse, the manufacture, possession, sale or use of which should be prohibited by law except for amounts which may be necessary for educational, experimental or research purposes conducted with the approval of the Governor."

==== North America ====
In Canada, diamorphine is a controlled substance under Schedule I of the Controlled Drugs and Substances Act (CDSA). Any person seeking or obtaining diamorphine without disclosing authorization 30 days before obtaining another prescription from a practitioner is guilty of an indictable offense and subject to imprisonment for a term not exceeding seven years. Possession of diamorphine for the purpose of trafficking is an indictable offense and subject to imprisonment for life.

In the United States, diamorphine is a Schedule I drug according to the Controlled Substances Act of 1970, making it illegal to possess without a DEA license. Possession of more than 100 grams of diamorphine or a mixture containing diamorphine is punishable with a minimum mandatory sentence of five years of imprisonment in a federal prison.

In 2021, the US state of Oregon became the first state to decriminalize the use of heroin after voters passed Ballot Measure 110 in 2020. This measure will allow people with small amounts to avoid arrest.

==== Turkey ====
Turkey maintains strict laws against the use, possession or trafficking of illegal drugs. If convicted under these offences, one could receive a heavy fine or a prison sentence of 4 to 24 years.

==== Misuse of prescription medication ====
Misused prescription medicine, such as opioids, can lead to heroin use and dependence. The number of death from illegal opioid overdose follows the increasing number of death caused by prescription opioid overdoses. Prescription opioids are relatively easy to obtain. This may ultimately lead to heroin injection because heroin is cheaper than prescribed pills.

=== Stigma ===
Heroin users are often referred to as 'amaparas' a term that researchers say is a dehumanizing and derogatory term that implies worthlessness and criminality. The term is perpetuating marginalization and discrimination, while preventing an understanding of the addiction crisis as a medical issue and addicts as people requiring social support.

=== Pharmaceutical supply chain ===
==== Production ====
===== Legal opium production =====
Heroin is produced from opium, which is regulated differently around the world. Unlike coca leaves in Peru—handled exclusively by the state monopoly, the National Coca Company (ENACO)—there is no state company dedicated to the commercialization of opium and its derivatives. While international treaties—such as the Single Convention on Narcotic Drugs (1961)—require strict state control or monopoly over the legal production and commercialization of opium for medical and scientific purposes, in practice, only a few countries maintain such a state monopoly today. Notably, India operates a state monopoly through the Government Opium and Alkaloid Factories (GOAF), also known as Opium and Alkaloid Works, which is responsible for processing raw opium into alkaloids for the pharmaceutical industry and managing the legal opium trade for medical and scientific use. Legal opium production in India, as well as in countries such as Turkey, Australia, France, Japan, and the UK, supplies licensed pharmaceutical manufacturers under close supervision to prevent diversion to illicit markets.

===== Licensed pharmaceutical manufacturers =====
Heroin and its production and distribution are strictly regulated by government health authorities and subject to international drug control treaties. In countries where medical diamorphine (heroin) is legal, a small number of licensed pharmaceutical manufacturers are authorized to produce diamorphine from morphine, which is derived from legally cultivated opium poppy. All manufacturing and handling are conducted by these licensed companies under close government oversight, operating under stringent national and international regulations. Their activities are monitored by agencies such as the International Narcotics Control Board (INCB), and the entire supply chain—from opium cultivation to the final pharmaceutical product—is subject to quotas, licensing, and detailed reporting requirements to prevent diversion to illicit markets.

==== Distribution ====
Diamorphine produced by licensed manufacturers is distributed to hospitals and clinics for medical use, primarily for pain management and, in some countries, for heroin-assisted treatment of opioid dependence. Distribution within the health care system is tightly controlled, and all use is documented and audited by health authorities. There is no commercial retail market for diamorphine; it is dispensed only by prescription and administered under medical supervision.

=== Illicit supply chain ===
==== Production ====
Diamorphine is produced from acetylation of morphine derived from natural opium sources. One such method of heroin production involves isolation of the water-soluble components of raw opium, including morphine, in a strongly basic aqueous solution, followed by recrystallization of the morphine base by addition of ammonium chloride. The solid morphine base is then filtered out. The morphine base is then reacted with acetic anhydride, which forms heroin. This highly impure brown heroin base may then undergo further purification steps, which produces a white-colored product; the final products have a different appearance depending on purity and have different names. Heroin purity has been classified into four grades. No.4 is the purest form – white powder (salt) to be easily dissolved and injected. No.3 is "brown sugar" for smoking (base). No.1 and No.2 are unprocessed raw heroin (salt or base).

==== Impurities ====
The image displays street heroin powder samples alongside illicit tablets containing opioids and amphetamines, seized during a forensic and medical investigation. (A) street heroin powder, (B) street heroin powder, (C) street heroin powder, (D) street heroin powder, (E) street heroin powder, (F) street heroin powder, (G) illicit morphine tablets containing caffein, dextromethorphan, 6-monoacetylcodeine, hydromorphone, papaverine, and noscapine alongside heroin, (H) illicit morphine tablets containing heroin, methamphetamine, and impurities detected in street heroin.

Heroin impurities are any associated chemical compounds present in illicit heroin, excluding diacetylmorphine for heroin itself and its major metabolic isomers (such as 3-MAM and 6-MAM). More commonly, impurities imply adulterants and diluents. Most of the products arising as impurities in heroin are chemical by-products, that is, residual opium alkaloids, unreacted reagents, and their degradation products, or intentional additive carriers, diluents, and adulterants. Illicit heroin is typically sold in an impure state, often containing a range of added compounds that alter its potency and bulk. In addition to the toxicity of the illicit heroin itself, these impurities can also be harmful. Due to the varying concentrations of biologically active substances in street heroin, its use is frequently associated with acute toxicity and fatal overdose outcomes.

To confirm heroin abuse, known opioid impurities are accessible, including various opium alkaloids (e.g., morphine, codeine), illicit heroin impurities (e.g., 6-monoacetylcodeine, noscapine, papaverine, etc.), as well as their associated metabolites (e.g., 3- and 6-monoacetylmorphine, morphine glucuronides). Also known are neutral impurities, also referred to as trace impurities, which are formed during heroin production—specifically from morphine—resulting from the action of acetic anhydride on opium alkaloids, along with residual solvents and inorganic compounds. Adulterants are intentionally added to alter the appearance (such as black tar heroin, "cheese", etc.), potency, or bulk of the heroin. The most frequently encountered substances include stimulants, other central nervous system depressants (excluding opioids), and other pharmacologically active substances (including complete pharmaceuticals). These most commonly include caffeine, paracetamol, phenobarbital and other barbiturates, benzodiazepines, and local anesthetics like procaine. Inert diluents—frequently sugars—such as lactose, sucrose, and other sugars, are also used.

Illicit heroin contains various pharmaceuticals, including over-the-counter, prescription, and controlled substances. Although it is difficult to claim that they are common across all regions of the world—as most of these impurities have only been reported once or a few times in the literature, and often within a single region—substances such as diazepam, dextromethorphan and methorphan, chloroquine, clotrimazole, phenacetin, dimenhydrinate, diphenhydramine (most often as Benadryl), metronidazole, aminophenazone, nicotinamide, methaqualone, salicylic acid, ephedrine, etiracetam, ketamine, nordazepam, pinazepam, alprazolam, sorbitol, tramadol, chlorphenamine, theophylline, oxazepam, ketazolam, phenobarbital, lidocaine, levorphanol, codeine, morphine, papaverine, noscapine, hydrocodone, and hydrocotarnine are nevertheless encountered.

Among others, natural compounds from the opium poppy (Papaver somniferum) are also found—namely thebaine and meconin, the latter being quite frequently encountered in heroin identification. Additionally, large amounts of sugars and sugar alcohols are present, such as, lactose, sucrose, maltose, fructose, mannitol, and inositol. There was a case in the United Kingdom where strychnine was detected in street heroin, while quinine has been found in the United States. Among controlled substances, cocaine and 3,4-methylenedioxymethamphetamine (MDMA) have been identified. Quite a wide variety of other chemical substances are also known to be found in street heroin.

The contamination of illicit "street drugs" with illicit fentanyl and its analogues is a highly prevalent phenomenon that directly affects the acute toxicity of the drug under whose guise it is sold. This is especially linked to the increasing number of fatal opioid overdoses in the United States in recent years. Fentanyl serves as a common adulterant in heroin and is intentionally added in most instances, whereas consumers of these mixtures are typically unaware of the purity and chemical composition of the substance being distributed.

Caffeine is used to increase the potency and bioavailability of the drug. Paracetamol is frequently added to heroin to provide a powdery texture and increase its bulk; like caffeine, it is inexpensive and has a melting point similar to that of heroin. Sedatives, specifically benzodiazepines such as diazepam, are added to enhance the sedative effects of heroin. The hallucinogenic antitussive agent dextromethorphan is sometimes added to heroin to create a more potent drug. Barbiturates such as barbital and phenobarbital are added to heroin for reasons similar to benzodiazepines—to enhance the sedative effect. It is unclear why antifungal drugs and even vitamins are added. Pharmaceuticals in combination with heroin exert a synergistic effect on the central nervous system and the cardiovascular system, which is especially important regarding the risks of respiratory center or cardiac arrest.

==== Trafficking ====
Traffic is heavy worldwide, with the biggest producer being Afghanistan. According to a U.N. sponsored survey, in 2004, Afghanistan accounted for production of 87 percent of the world's diamorphine. Afghan opium kills around 100,000 people annually.

In 2003 The Independent reported:

The cultivation of opium [in Afghanistan] reached its peak in 1999, when 350 square miles (910 km^{2}) of poppies were sown ... The following year the Taliban banned poppy cultivation, ... a move which cut production by 94 percent ... By 2001 only 30 square miles (78 km^{2}) of land were in use for growing opium poppies. A year later, after American and British troops had removed the Taliban and installed the interim government, the land under cultivation leapt back to 285 square miles (740 km^{2}), with Afghanistan supplanting Burma to become the world's largest opium producer once more.

Opium production in that country has increased rapidly since, reaching an all-time high in 2006. War in Afghanistan once again appeared as a facilitator of the trade. Some 3.3 million Afghans are involved in producing opium.

Afghanistan opium poppy cultivation, 1994–2016 (hectares)

At present, opium poppies are mostly grown in Afghanistan (224,000 hectares (550,000 acres)), and in Southeast Asia, especially in the region known as the Golden Triangle straddling Burma (57,600 hectares (142,000 acres)), Thailand, Vietnam, Laos (6,200 hectares (15,000 acres)) and Yunnan province in China. There is also cultivation of opium poppies in Pakistan (493 hectares (1,220 acres)), Mexico (12,000 hectares (30,000 acres)) and in Colombia (378 hectares (930 acres)). According to the DEA, the majority of the heroin consumed in the United States comes from Mexico (50%) and Colombia (43–45%) via Mexican criminal cartels such as Sinaloa Cartel. However, these statistics may be significantly unreliable, the DEA's 50/50 split between Colombia and Mexico is contradicted by the amount of hectares cultivated in each country and in 2014, the DEA claimed most of the heroin in the US came from Colombia. As of 2015, the Sinaloa Cartel is the most active drug cartel involved in smuggling illicit drugs such as heroin into the United States and trafficking them throughout the United States. According to the Royal Canadian Mounted Police, 90% of the heroin seized in Canada (where the origin was known) came from Afghanistan. Pakistan is the destination and transit point for 40 percent of the opiates produced in Afghanistan, other destinations of Afghan opiates are Russia, Europe and Iran.

A conviction for trafficking heroin carries the death penalty in most Southeast Asian, some East Asian and Middle Eastern countries (see Use of death penalty worldwide for details), among which Malaysia, Singapore and Thailand are the strictest. The penalty applies even to citizens of countries where the penalty is not in place, sometimes causing controversy when foreign visitors are arrested for trafficking, for example, the arrest of nine Australians in Bali, the death sentence given to Nola Blake in Thailand in 1987, or the hanging of an Australian citizen Van Tuong Nguyen in Singapore.

===== Routes =====
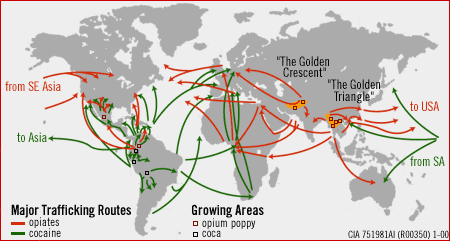
International drug routes

====== The balkan route ======
The Balkan route remains the principal corridor for trafficking illegal opiates, primarily heroin, from Afghanistan to Western and Central Europe, with criminal networks-often highly organized and adaptable-leveraging both legal businesses and corruption to facilitate the smuggling, storage, and distribution of drugs. These groups generate enormous illicit profits, with the annual gross income from drug trafficking along the Balkan route estimated between $13.9 and $21.4 billion from 2019 to 2022, of which up to half is illegally moved across borders through complex financial flows that include shell companies, cryptocurrencies, and informal systems like hawala. The majority of these profits, around 90 percent, come from opiates, and the scale of this income rivals or exceeds the GDP of several countries along the route. The movement of these illicit funds not only sustains and expands drug trafficking operations but also undermines economic stability and governance in affected countries, making the Balkan route a persistent and multifaceted challenge for law enforcement and policymakers in the region.

===== Trafficking history =====
Primary worldwide producers of heroin

The origins of the present international illegal heroin trade can be traced back to laws passed in many countries in the early 1900s that closely regulated the production and sale of opium and its derivatives including heroin. At first, heroin flowed from countries where it was still legal into countries where it was no longer legal. By the mid-1920s, heroin production had been made illegal in many parts of the world. An illegal trade developed at that time between heroin labs in China (mostly in Shanghai and Tianjin) and other nations. The weakness of the government in China and conditions of civil war enabled heroin production to take root there. Chinese triad gangs eventually came to play a major role in the illicit heroin trade. The French Connection route started in the 1930s.

Heroin trafficking was virtually eliminated in the US during World War II because of temporary trade disruptions caused by the war. Japan's war with China had cut the normal distribution routes for heroin and the war had generally disrupted the movement of opium. After World War II, the Mafia took advantage of the weakness of the postwar Italian government and set up heroin labs in Sicily which was located along the historic route opium took westward into Europe and the United States. Large-scale international heroin production effectively ended in China with the victory of the communists in the civil war in the late 1940s. The elimination of Chinese production happened at the same time that Sicily's role in the trade developed.

Although it remained legal in some countries until after World War II, health risks, addiction, and widespread recreational use led most western countries to declare heroin a controlled substance by the latter half of the 20th century. In the late 1960s and early 1970s, the CIA supported anti-Communist Chinese Nationalists settled near the Sino-Burmese border and Hmong tribesmen in Laos. This helped the development of the Golden Triangle opium production region, which supplied about one-third of heroin consumed in the US after the 1973 American withdrawal from Vietnam. In 1999, Burma, the heartland of the Golden Triangle, was the second-largest producer of heroin, after Afghanistan.

The Soviet-Afghan war led to increased production in the Pakistani-Afghan border regions, as US-backed mujaheddin militants raised money for arms from selling opium, contributing heavily to the modern Golden Crescent creation. By 1980, 60 percent of the heroin sold in the US originated in Afghanistan. It increased international production of heroin at lower prices in the 1980s. The trade shifted away from Sicily in the late 1970s as various criminal organizations violently fought with each other over the trade. The fighting also led to a stepped-up government law enforcement presence in Sicily.

Following the discovery at a Jordanian airport of a toner cartridge that had been modified into an improvised explosive device, the resultant increased level of airfreight scrutiny led to a major shortage (drought) of heroin from October 2010 until April 2011. This was reported in most of mainland Europe and the UK which led to a price increase of approximately 30 percent in the cost of street heroin and increased demand for diverted methadone. The number of addicts seeking treatment also increased significantly during this period. Other heroin droughts (shortages) have been attributed to cartels restricting supply in order to force a price increase and also to a fungus that attacked the opium crop of 2009. Many people thought that the American government had introduced pathogens into the Afghanistan atmosphere in order to destroy the opium crop and thus starve insurgents of income.

On 13 March 2012, Haji Bagcho, with ties to the Taliban, was convicted by a US District Court of conspiracy, distribution of heroin for importation into the United States and narco-terrorism. Based on heroin production statistics compiled by the United Nations Office on Drugs and Crime, in 2006, Bagcho's activities accounted for approximately 20 percent of the world's total production for that year.

==== Street price ====
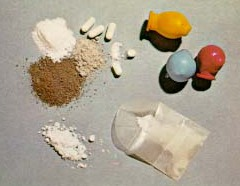
Heroin in powder & pill forms with balloons

The European Monitoring Centre for Drugs and Drug Addiction reports that the retail price of brown heroin varies from €14.5 per gram in Turkey to €110 per gram in Sweden, with most European countries reporting typical prices of €35–40 per gram. The price of white heroin is reported only by a few European countries and ranged between €27 and €110 per gram.

The United Nations Office on Drugs and Crime claims in its 2008 World Drug Report that typical US retail prices are US$172 per gram.

=== Urban legends ===
==== Bluetoothing ====
In early 2017, sensationalist media reports claimed that ‘nyaope’ users shared the drug-induced high through small blood transfusions, a practice supposedly called "bluetoothing" (from the Bluetooth wireless technology). The claim was untrue: the practice is not known on the street and physiologically could not achieve the claimed effect.

==== Claims that 'whoonga' or 'nyaope' is made from anti-retrovirals, rat poison, etc. ====
Sensationalist media reports have often claimed that ‘whoonga’ or ‘nyaope’ is a uniquely South African drug containing ingredients such as rat poison, anti-retroviral medication, and materials gleaned from the cathode tubes in stolen flat screen televisions. However scientific laboratory studies have shown these claims to be urban legends, and that 'whoonga' and 'nyapoe' are in fact simply heroin and do not contain the aforementioned adulterants. According to researcher Jesse Copelyn it "has been shown "that media accounts that frame nyaope as a new and exotic drug are misleading" and "have obscured the fact that South Africa simply has a major heroin crisis".

==== Systemic criminality ====
It is often said that all or most users sustain their addiction via crime, however academic Mark Hunter shows that the majority work for extremely low pay, often for other poor people.

== Research ==
Researchers are attempting to reproduce the biosynthetic pathway that produces morphine in genetically engineered yeast. In June 2015 the S-reticuline could be produced from sugar and R-reticuline could be converted to morphine, but the intermediate reaction could not be performed.

== See also ==
- Allegations of CIA drug trafficking
- Cheese (recreational drug) – Heroin-based recreational drug
- The Politics of Heroin in Southeast Asia – 1972 non-fiction book
