= 3-Monoacetylmorphine =

Chemical compound

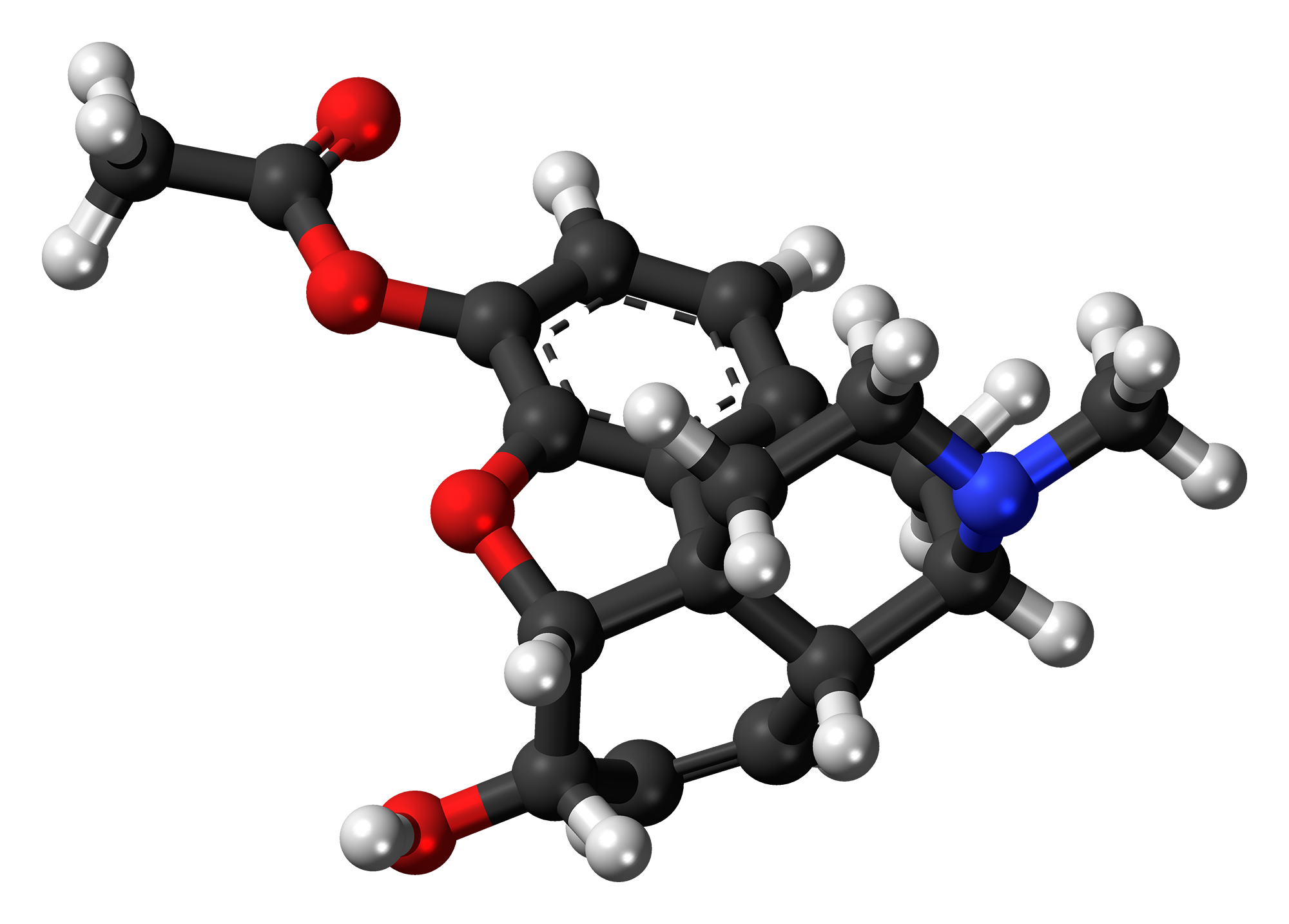

Clinical data
- Other names: 3-Acetylmorphine, O(3)-monoacetylmorphine
- Routes of administration: Intravenous
- ATC code: none

Legal status
- Legal status: AU: S9 (Prohibited substance); UK: Class A; US: Schedule I

Identifiers
- IUPAC name: 3-acetyl-6-hydroxy-(5α,6α)-7,8-Didehydro-4,5-epoxy-17-methylmorphinan
- CAS Number: 5140-28-3
- PubChem CID: 5462504
- ChemSpider: 4575431
- UNII: 9N7243EY5T
- CompTox Dashboard (EPA): DTXSID30183774
- ECHA InfoCard: 100.208.392

Chemical and physical data
- Formula: C_{19}H_{21}NO_{4}
- Molar mass: 327.380 g·mol^{−1}
- 3D model (JSmol): Interactive image
- SMILES: CC(=O)OC1=C2C3=C(C[C@@H]4[C@H]5[C@]3(CCN4C)[C@@H](O2)[C@H](C=C5)O)C=C1
- InChI: InChI=1S/C19H21NO4/c1-10(21)23-15-6-3-11-9-13-12-4-5-14(22)18-19(12,7-8-20(13)2)16(11)17(15)24-18/h3-6,12-14,18,22H,7-9H2,1-2H3/t12-,13+,14-,18-,19-/m0/s1; Key:GMLREHXYJDLZOU-LEPYJNQMSA-N

3-Monoacetylmorphine (3-MAM) or 3-acetylmorphine is a less active metabolite of heroin (diacetylmorphine), the other two being morphine and more active 6-monoacetylmorphine (6-MAM).

Because of the acetyl-group in 3-position, 3-MAM has relatively weak affinity to μ-opioid receptors.

As 3-O-acetylmorphine-6-O-sulfate (C_{19}H_{23}NO_{7}S), where 6-OH is changed to 6-O-SO_{3}, it can act as a potent, centrally acting morphine derivative and has important analgesic properties.

3-MAM-6-Sulfate (M3A6S)

Acetyl groups of heroin. In 3-MAM lower group is changed to hydrogen making hydroxyl-group in 6-position.
