= Rolleston Committee =

Historic UK health committee

In 1924, following concerns about the treatment of addicts by doctors, James Smith Whitaker suggested to the Home Office who suggested to the Ministry of Health Departmental Committee on Morphine and Heroin Addiction be formed under the chairmanship of Sir Humphry Rolleston to "... consider and advise as to the circumstances, if any, in which the supply of morphine and heroin (including preparations containing morphine and heroin) to persons suffering from addiction to those drugs may be regarded as medically advisable, and as to the precautions which it is desirable that medical practitioners administering or prescribing morphine or heroin should adopt for the avoidance of abuse, and to suggest any administrative measures that seem expedient for securing observance of such precautions". The committee is usually referred to as the Rolleston Committee.

== The Rolleston Report ==
The committee recommended that gradual reduction in the amount of drug consumed was the best method of treatment and that there should be no restrictions on the doctors allowed to prescribe morphine and heroin, their methods of treatment, or the quantity they could supply, although authority to supply could be withdrawn from over-prescribing doctors.

They allowed doctors to prescribe addictive drugs in a controlled manner, in the same way as they supplied other drugs. This became known as the 'British System' of drug supply and control.

They allowed addicts who could not be cured to be maintained on a, usually small, amount of a drug.

They said that addiction was a middle class phenomenon, so criminal sanctions were unnecessary, as few criminal or lower class addicts were known.

They added that addiction to such drugs as heroin or morphine was a minor problem in Great Britain.

== Formalities ==
The terms of reference given by the Minister of Health (John Wheatley) when first appointing the committee on 30 September 1924, and appointing Rolleston as its chairman, had been

To consider and advise as to the circumstances, if any, in which the supply of morphine and heroin (including preparations containing morphine and heroin) to persons suffering from addiction to those drugs may be regarded as medically advisable, and as to the precautions which it is desirable that medical practitioners administering or prescribing morphine or heroin should adopt for the avoidance of abuse, and to suggest any administrative measures that seem expedient for securing observance of such precautions.

Some months later, on 12 February 1925, the Minister of Health (Neville Chamberlain) added

To consider and advise whether it is expedient that any or all preparations which contain morphine or heroin of a percentage lower than that specified in the Dangerous Drugs Acts should be brought within the provisions if the Acts and Regulations and, if so, under what conditions.

The committee's report to the Minister of Health (Chamberlain) contained the committee's findings about precautions when allowing morphine or heroin to be administered to addicts and in allowing the use of those substances in ordinary medical treatment. On the question of the scope of the Dangerous Drugs Act 1920 (10 & 11 Geo. 5. c. 46) the report concluded that there was little if any abuse or danger of addiction arising from any preparations then excluded from the scope of the Dangerous Drugs Acts with the possible exception of Chlorodyne, and the report tentatively proposed that no preparation should be sold under the name Chlorodyne which contained more than 0.1 per cent of morphine.

== Consequences ==
The Rolleston Committee Report was followed by "a period of nearly forty years of tranquillity in Britain, known as the Rolleston Era. During this period the medical profession regulated the distribution of licit opioid supplies and the provisions of the Dangerous Drugs Acts of 1920 and 1923 controlled illicit supplies."

== See also ==
- Brain Committee
