= 6-Monoacetylmorphine =

Metabolite of heroin

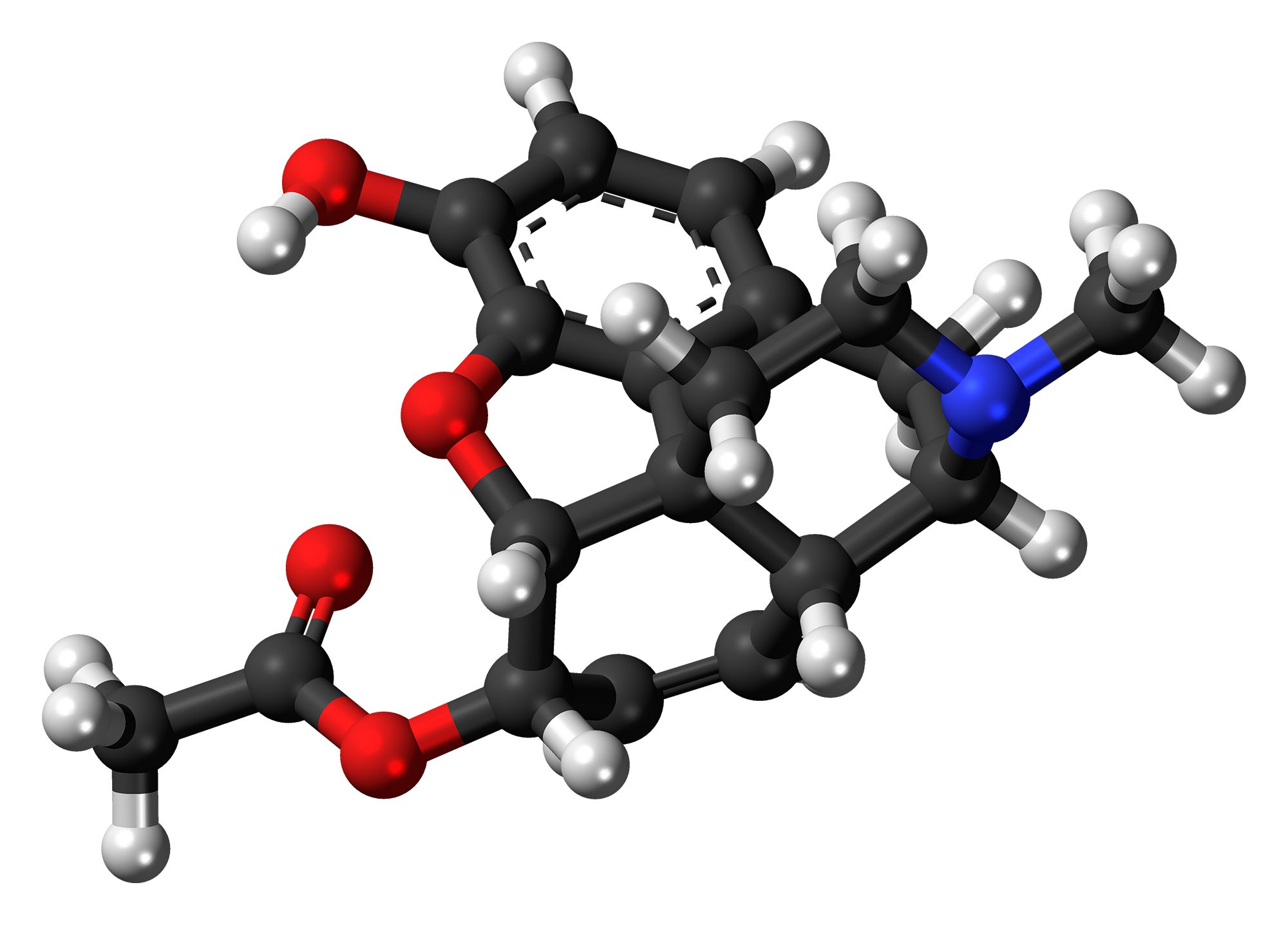

Clinical data
- Other names: 6-Acetylmorphine
- Routes of administration: Intravenous
- ATC code: none

Legal status
- Legal status: AU: S9 (Prohibited substance); UK: Class A

Pharmacokinetic data
- Elimination half-life: 0.6 hours

Identifiers
- IUPAC name: (9-hydroxy-3-methyl-2,4,4a,7,7a,13-hexahydro-1H-4,12-methanobenzofuro[3,2-e]isoquinolin-7-yl) acetate
- CAS Number: 2784-73-8
- PubChem CID: 5462507
- DrugBank: DBMET01172
- ChemSpider: 4575434
- UNII: M5E47P1ZCH
- ChEBI: CHEBI:2168
- ChEMBL: ChEMBL592009
- CompTox Dashboard (EPA): DTXSID60182154
- ECHA InfoCard: 100.150.555

Chemical and physical data
- Formula: C_{19}H_{21}NO_{4}
- Molar mass: 327.380 g·mol^{−1}
- 3D model (JSmol): Interactive image
- SMILES: [H][C@@]12OC3=C(O)C=CC4=C3[C@@]11CCN(C)[C@]([H])(C4)[C@]1([H])C=C[C@@H]2OC(C)=O
- InChI: InChI=1S/C19H21NO4/c1-9(21)10-8-15(23)17-16-11(10)7-13-12-3-4-14(22)18(24-17)19(12,16)5-6-20(13)2/h3-4,8,12-14,18,22-23H,5-7H2,1-2H3/t12-,13+,14-,18-,19-/m0/s1; Key:JJGYGPZNTOPXGV-SSTWWWIQSA-N

6-Monoacetylmorphine (6-MAM, 6-acetylmorphine, or 6-AM) is an opioid and also one of three active metabolites of heroin (diacetylmorphine), the others being morphine and the much less active 3-monoacetylmorphine (3-MAM).

== Pharmacology ==
6-MAM occurs as a metabolite of heroin. Once it has passed first-pass metabolism, 6-MAM is then metabolized into morphine or excreted in urine.

Heroin is rapidly metabolized by esterase enzymes in the brain and has an extremely short half-life. It has also relatively weak affinity to μ-opioid receptors because the 3-hydroxy group, essential for effective binding to the receptor, is masked by the acetyl group. Therefore, heroin acts as a prodrug, serving as a lipophilic transporter for the systemic delivery of morphine, which actively binds with μ-opioid receptors.

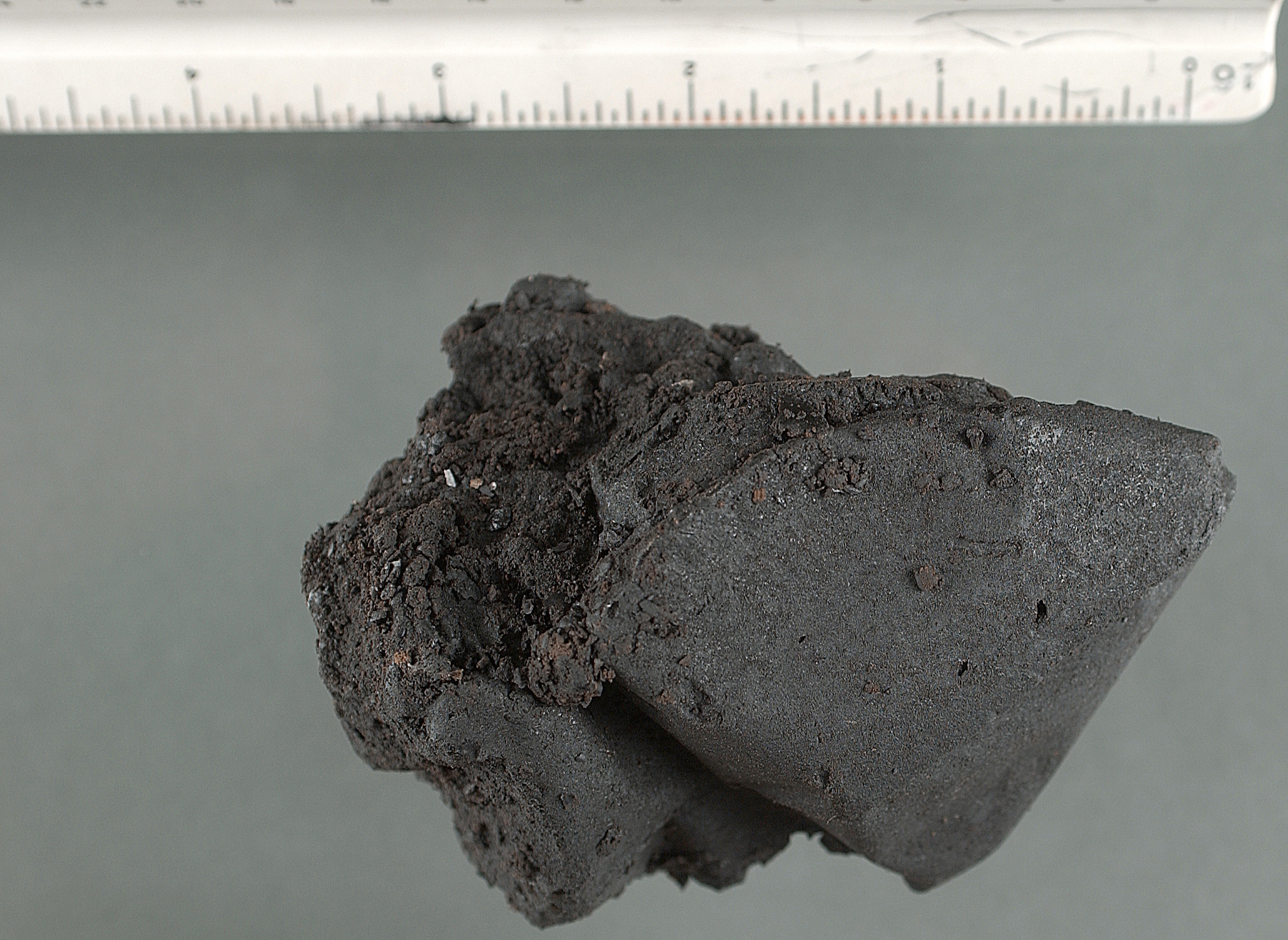
Black tar heroin

6-MAM already has a free 3-hydroxy group and shares the high lipophilicity of heroin, so it penetrates the brain just as quickly and does not need to be deacetylated at the 6-position in order to be bioactivated; this makes 6-MAM somewhat more potent than heroin.

== Availability ==
6-MAM is rarely encountered in an isolated form due to the difficulty in selectively acetylating morphine at the 6-position without also acetylating the 3-position. However, it is found in significant amounts in black tar heroin along with heroin itself.

== Synthesis ==
The production of black tar heroin results in significant amounts of 6-MAM in the final product. 6-MAM is approximately 30 percent more active than diacetylmorphine itself, This is why despite lower heroin content, black tar heroin may be more potent than some other forms of heroin. 6-MAM can be synthesized from morphine using glacial acetic acid with concentrated sulfuric acid as a catalyst. The acetic acid must be of a high purity (97–99 percent) for the acid to properly acetylate the morphine at the 6th position effectively creating 6-MAM. Acetic acid is used rather than acetic anhydride, as acetic acid is not strong enough to acetylate the phenolic 3-hydroxy group but is able to acetylate the 6-hydroxy group, thus selectively producing 6-MAM rather than heroin. Acetic acid is a convenient way to produce 6-MAM, as acetic acid also is not a watched chemical as it is the main component of vinegar.

== Chemistry ==
=== Detection in bodily fluids ===
Since 6-MAM is a metabolite unique to heroin, its presence in the urine confirms heroin use. This is significant because a urine immunoassay drug screen typically tests for morphine, which is a metabolite of a number of legal and illegal opioids such as codeine, morphine sulfate, and heroin. Trace amounts of 6-MAM are excreted approximately 6–8 hours following heroin use.

6-MAM is naturally found in trace amounts in rat and cow brains.

== See also ==
- M3G, morphine-3-glucuronide an inactive metabolite of morphine much as 3-MAM is the less active metabolite of heroin (notably here as morphine is an active secondary metabolite of heroin itself with 6-Monoacetylmorphine being the intermediate stage)
- M6G, morphine-6-glucuronide the active variant in close relation to 6-MAM, being relative as twin metabolites of this articles very metabolite itself, morphine, twinned to a metabolite (3-MAM) of a parent compound (heroin) of this article's chemical
