= Mephedrone =

Recreational drug

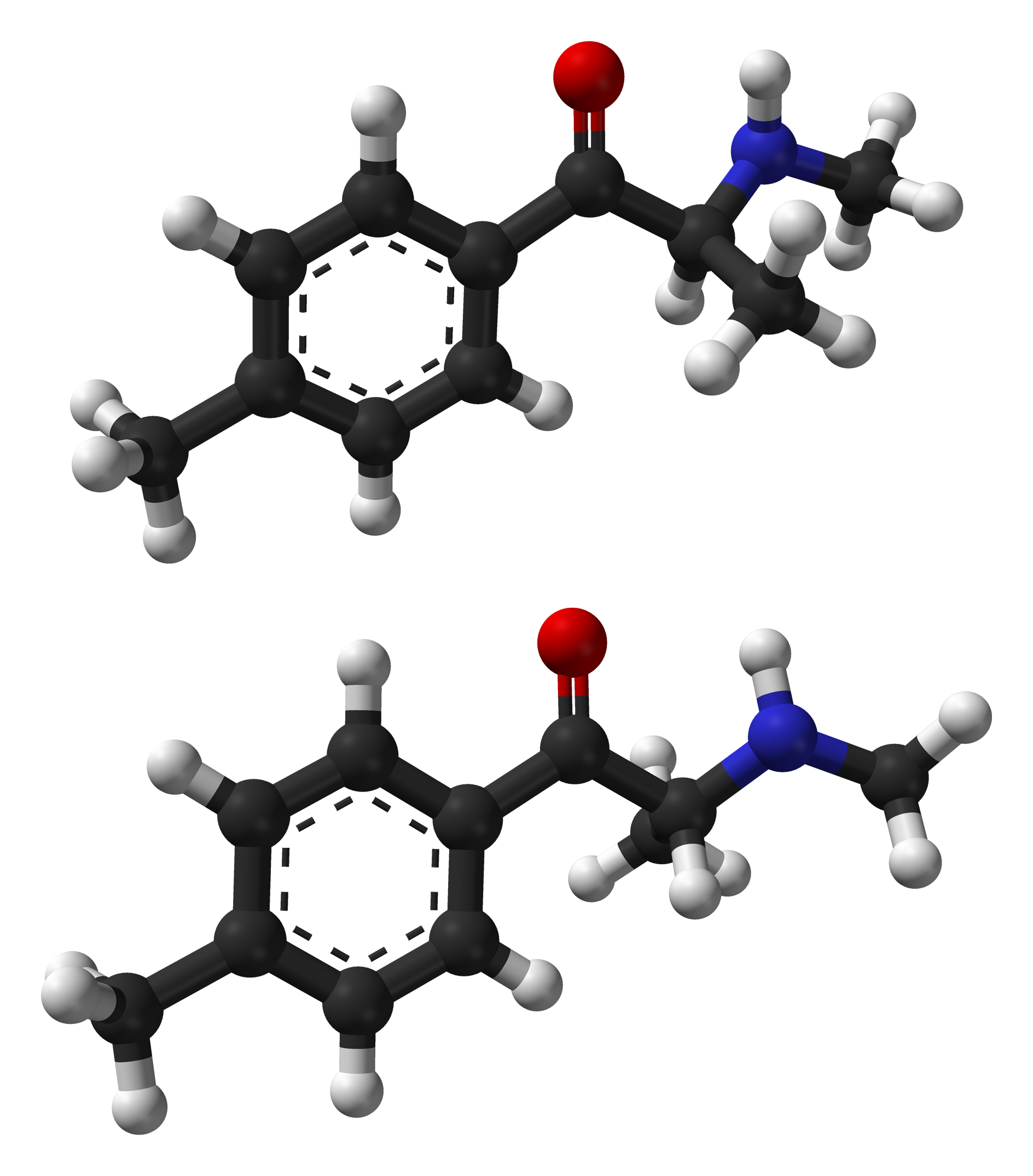

Clinical data
- Pronunciation: /ˈmɛfədroʊn/
- Other names: 4-Methylmethcathinone; 4-Methyl-N-methylcathinone; 4-MMC; 4-Me-MCAT; 4-Methylephedrone; 2-Methylamino-1-p-tolylpropan-1-one
- Routes of administration: Oral, insufflation, IV, rectal
- Drug class: Serotonin–norepinephrine–dopamine releasing agent; Serotonin–norepinephrine–dopamine reuptake inhibitor; Stimulant; Entactogen; Euphoriant; Sympathomimetic
- ATC code: None

Legal status
- Legal status: AU: S9 (Prohibited substance); BR: Class F2 (Prohibited psychotropics); DE: Anlage I (Authorized scientific use only); UK: Class B; US: Schedule I; UN: Psychotropic Schedule II; SE: Förteckning I

Pharmacokinetic data
- Metabolites: 4-Methylephedrine

Identifiers
- IUPAC name: (RS)-2-Methylamino-1-(4-methylphenyl)propan-1-one
- CAS Number: 1189805-46-6 1189726-22-4 (HCl)
- PubChem CID: 29982893
- DrugBank: DB13108
- ChemSpider: 21485694
- UNII: 8BA8T27317
- KEGG: C22785
- ChEBI: CHEBI:59331
- CompTox Dashboard (EPA): DTXSID20891437
- ECHA InfoCard: 100.189.720

Chemical and physical data
- Formula: C_{11}H_{15}NO
- Molar mass: 177.247 g·mol^{−1}
- 3D model (JSmol): Interactive image
- SMILES: CC1=CC=C(C(C(NC)C)=O)C=C1
- InChI: InChI=1S/C11H15NO/c1-8-4-6-10(7-5-8)11(13)9(2)12-3/h4-7,9,12H,1-3H3; Key:YELGFTGWJGBAQU-UHFFFAOYSA-N

Mephedrone, also known as 4-methylmethcathinone, 4-MMC, or 4-methylephedrone, is a synthetic stimulant drug belonging to the amphetamine and cathinone classes. It is commonly referred to by slang names such as drone, M-CAT, white magic, meow meow, and bubble. Chemically, it is similar to the cathinone compounds found in the khat plant, native to eastern Africa.

Mephedrone is typically found in tablet or crystal form, and users may swallow, snort, or inject it. Its effects are similar to those of MDMA, amphetamines, and cocaine, producing euphoria and increased sociability. Mephedrone is rapidly absorbed, with a half-life of about two hours, and is primarily metabolized by CYP2D6 enzymes. Its effects are dose-dependent. Side effects can include cardiovascular changes and anxiety.

Mephedrone was first synthesised in 1929 but remained relatively obscure until it was rediscovered around 1999–2000. At that time, it was legal to produce and possess in many countries. By 2000, mephedrone was available for sale on the Internet. By 2008, law enforcement agencies had become aware of the substance, and by 2010, it had been reported in most European countries, with significant prevalence in the United Kingdom. Mephedrone was first made illegal in Israel in 2008, followed by Sweden later that year. By 2010, many European countries had banned the substance, and in December of that year, the European Union ruled it illegal. In Australia, New Zealand, and the United States, it is considered an analog of other illegal drugs and can be controlled under laws similar to the US Federal Analog Act. In September 2011, the US temporarily classified mephedrone as a Schedule I drug, with the classification taking effect in October 2011. This was made permanent in July 2012 with the passage of the Synthetic Drug Abuse Prevention Act (SDAPA).

== Uses ==
=== Recreational ===
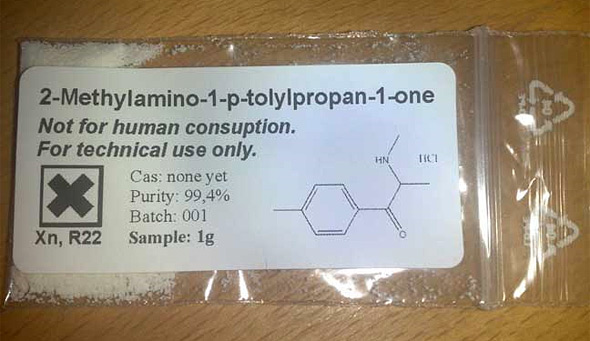
A ziplock bag containing mephedrone, labeled "Not for human consumption. For technical use only."

Users have reported that mephedrone causes euphoria, stimulation, an enhanced appreciation for music, an elevated mood, decreased hostility, improved mental function and mild sexual stimulation; these effects are similar to the effects of cocaine, amphetamines and MDMA, and last different lengths of time depending on the way the drug is taken. Of 70 Dutch users of mephedrone, 58 described it as an overall pleasant experience, and 12 described it as an unpleasant experience. In a survey of UK users who had previously taken cocaine, most users found it produced a better-quality and longer-lasting high and was less addictive. The users were also asked to compare the "risk", and they answered that it was equal. A study of users in Northern Ireland found they did not equate the fact that mephedrone was legal with it being safe to use. This was contrary to another study in New Zealand, where users of benzylpiperazine thought that because it was legal, it was safe. According to Alexander Shulgin in his book The Shulgin Index, Volume One: Psychedelic Phenethylamines and Related Compounds, mephedrone is at doses of 200 orally active and at doses of 120 to 160 mg by intramuscular injection.

=== Available forms ===
Mephedrone can come in capsules, tablets, or white powder, which users may swallow, insufflate, inject, smoke, or use rectally. When taken orally, users reported they could feel the effects within 15–45 minutes; when snorted, the effects were felt within minutes and peaked within half an hour. The effects last for between two and three hours when taken orally or nasally, and an hour if taken intravenously. It is sometimes sold mixed with methylone in a product called bubbles in the UK and also mixed with other cathinones, including ethcathinone, butylone, fluoromethcathinone and methedrone.

==== Purity ====
One published study that analysed samples of mephedrone bought using the internet in the UK in 2010 found it was racemic (a mixture of both stereoisomers) and of high purity. An unpublished study of six samples also ordered off the internet in the UK in 2010 found they contained very few organic impurities. Four products sold in Irish head shops were tested in 2010 and were found to contain between 82% and 14% mephedrone, with some products containing benzocaine and caffeine.

== Adverse effects ==
Table from the 2010 ISCD study ranking various drugs (legal and illegal) based on statements by drug-harm experts. Mephedrone was found to be the 13th overall most dangerous drug.

=== Short-term effects ===
The EMCDDA reported mephedrone can cause various unintended side effects including dilated pupils, poor concentration, teeth grinding, problems focusing visually, poor short-term memory, hallucinations, delusions, and erratic behaviour. They noted the most severe effects appear anecdotally to be linked with high doses or prolonged use, and the effects may be due to users taking other intoxicants at the same time. Other effects users in internet forums have noted include changes in body temperature, increased heart rate, breathing difficulties, loss of appetite, increased sweating, discolouration of extremities, anxiety, paranoia and depression. When snorted, it can also cause nose bleeds and nose burns. A survey conducted by the UK National Addiction Centre found 67% of mephedrone users experienced sweating, 51% suffered from headaches, 43% from heart palpitations, 27% from nausea and 15% from cold or blue fingers, indicative of vasoconstriction occurring. Doctors at Guy's Hospital in London reported that of 15 patients they treated after taking mephedrone in 2009, 53% were agitated, 40% had increased heart rates, 20% had systolic hypertension and 20% had seizures; three required treatment with benzodiazepines, predominantly to control their agitation. They reported none of their patients suffered from cold or blue peripheries, contrary to other reports. Nine of the 15 patients had a Glasgow coma scale (GCS) of 15, indicating they were in a normal mental state; four had a GCS below 8, but these patients all reported using a central nervous system depressant, most commonly GHB, with mephedrone. The patients also reported polydrug use of a variety of compounds.

=== Neurotoxicity ===
Mephedrone has been found to be a monoaminergic neurotoxin in animals and induces serotonergic neurotoxicity. Although some studies in animal models reported no damage to dopamine nerve endings in the striatum and no significant changes in brain monoamine levels, some others suggested a rapid reduction in serotonin transporter (SERT) and dopamine transporter (DAT) function. Persistent serotonergic deficits were observed after binge-like treatment in a warm environment and in both serotonergic and dopaminergic nerve endings at high ambient temperature. Oxidative stress cytotoxicity and an increase in frontal cortex lipid peroxidation were also reported. Although mephedrone has been found to be a monoaminergic neurotoxin, in one study, moderate doses of MDMA produced serotonergic neurotoxicity in rodents whereas mephedrone and methylone did not do so, suggesting that cathinones like mephedrone may be less neurotoxic than their corresponding amphetamine counterparts like MDMA.

=== Reinforcement disorders ===
There have been reports of users craving mephedrone, suggesting it may be addictive.

=== Others ===
There is a case report of pulmonary arterial hypertension with chronic long-term use of mephedrone.

== Overdose ==
=== Toxicity ===
In 2009, one case of sympathomimetic toxicity was reported in the UK after a person took 0.2 g of mephedrone orally, and after this did not achieve the desired effect, intramuscularly injected 3.8 g mixed with water into his thighs. Shortly afterwards, the user "developed palpitations, blurred tunnel vision, chest pressure and sweating". The patient was treated with 1 mg of lorazepam and the sympathomimetic features decreased and the user was discharged within six hours of arrival. One case of serotonin syndrome has been reported, where the patient was already prescribed fluoxetine and olanzapine, and then took 40 tablets containing mephedrone in one night. He was treated with lorazepam and discharged 15 hours after admission. Both enantiomers of methcathinone, which differs only in the lack of the methyl group on the phenyl ring when compared to mephedrone, have been shown to be toxic to rat dopamine neurons, and the S-enantiomer was also toxic against serotonin neurons. Simon Gibbons and Mire Zloh of the School of Pharmacy, University of London stated, based on the chemical similarities between methcathinone and mephedrone, "it is highly likely that mephedrone will display neurotoxicity". However, Brunt and colleagues stated, "extreme caution" should be used when inferring the toxicity of mephedrone from methcathinone, noting some of the toxicity associated with methcathinone is due to manganese impurities related to its synthesis, rather than the compound itself. They concluded more experimental research is needed to investigate the toxicity of mephedrone.

Doctors who treated a 15-year-old female suffering from mephedrone intoxication suggested in The Lancet that, like MDMA, mephedrone may promote serotonin-mediated release of antidiuretic hormone, resulting in hyponatraemia and an altered mental state. In another case, a 19-year-old male was admitted to hospital suffering from inflammation of the heart, 20 hours after taking one gram of mephedrone. The doctors treating the patient stated it was caused by either a direct toxic effect of mephedrone on the heart muscle, or by an immune response. One case of acquired methaemoglobinaemia, where a patient had "bluish lips and fingers", has also been reported, after the user snorted one gram of mephedrone. The patient started to recover after arriving at the hospital and it was not necessary to administer any medication.

=== Deaths ===
==== Sweden ====
In 2008, an 18-year-old Swedish woman died in Stockholm after taking mephedrone. The newspaper Svenska Dagbladet reported the woman went into convulsions and turned blue in the face. Doctors reported she was comatose and suffering from hyponatremia and severe hypokalemia; the woman died one and a half days after the onset of symptoms. An autopsy showed severe brain swelling. Mephedrone was scheduled to be classified as a "dangerous substance" in Sweden even before the woman's death at Karolinska University Hospital on 14 December, but the death brought more media attention to the drug. The possession of mephedrone became classified as a criminal offence in Sweden on 15 December 2008.

==== United Kingdom ====
In 2010, unconfirmed reports speculated about the role mephedrone has played in the deaths of several young people in the UK. By July 2010, mephedrone had been alleged to be involved in 52 fatalities in the UK, but detected in only 38 of these cases. Of the nine that coroners had finished investigating, two were caused directly by mephedrone. The first death reported to be caused by mephedrone use was that of 46-year-old John Sterling Smith, who had underlying health problems and repeatedly injected the drug. A report in Forensic Science International in August 2010 stated mephedrone intoxication has been recorded as the cause of death in two cases in Scotland. Post-mortem samples showed the concentration of mephedrone in the blood was 22 mg/L in one case and 3.3 mg/L in the other. The death of a teenager in the UK in November 2009 was widely reported as being caused by mephedrone, but a report by the coroner concluded she had died from natural causes. In March 2010, the deaths of two teenagers in Scunthorpe were widely reported by the media to be caused by mephedrone. Toxicology reports showed the teenagers had not taken any mephedrone and had died as a result of consuming alcohol and methadone, a synthetic opioid. According to Fiona Measham, a criminologist who is a member of the Advisory Council on the Misuse of Drugs, the reporting of the unconfirmed deaths by newspapers followed "the usual cycle of 'exaggeration, distortion, inaccuracy and sensationalism'" associated with the reporting of recreational drug use.

==== United States ====
Mephedrone has been implicated in the death of a 22-year-old man, who had also injected black tar heroin. Mephedrone was found in his blood at a concentration of 0.50 mg/L and in his urine at a concentration of 198 mg/L. The blood concentration of morphine, a metabolite of heroin, was 0.06 mg/L. For comparison, the average blood morphine concentration resulting from deadly overdoses involving only heroin is around 0.34 mg/L.

== Pharmacology ==
=== Pharmacodynamics ===
Monoamine release of mephedrone and related agents (EC_{50}, nM)
Compound	NE	DA	5-HT	Ref
Dextroamphetamine	6.6–7.2	5.8–24.8	698–1,765	
Dextromethamphetamine	12.3–13.8	8.5–24.5	736–1,292	
4-Methylamphetamine	22.2	44.1	53.4	
4-Methylmethamphetamine	66.9	41.3	67.4	
MDMA	54.1–110	51.2–278	49.6–72	
MDA	108	190	160	
Methylone	140–270	117–220	234–708	
Cathinone	23.6–25.6	34.8–83.1	6,100–7,595	
Methcathinone	22–26.1	12.5–49.9	2,592–5,853	
3-Methylmethcathinone (3-MMC)	27	28–70.6	268–292	
Normephedrone	100	220	210	
R(+)-Normephedrone	89	150	179	
S(–)-Normephedrone	115	391	1,592	
Mephedrone	58–62.7	49.1–51	118.3–122	
S(–)-Mephedrone	ND	74	61	
R(+)-Mephedrone	ND	31	1,470	
Notes: The smaller the value, the more strongly the drug releases the neurotransmitter. The assays were done in rat brain synaptosomes and human potencies may be different. See also Monoamine releasing agent § Activity profiles for a larger table with more compounds. Refs:

Mephedrone acts as a potent substrate for monoamine transporters, including the dopamine transporter (DAT), serotonin transporter (SERT), and norepinephrine transporter (NET). It inhibits the reuptake of these neurotransmitters and promotes their release. The drug induces a rapid and significant increase in extracellular levels of dopamine, serotonin, and norepinephrine. This effect is more pronounced for serotonin compared to dopamine, which distinguishes mephedrone from much of the other psychostimulants. The pharmacodynamic profile of mephedrone is often compared to MDMA and methamphetamine. Like MDMA, it has a greater effect on serotonin than dopamine release. Similar to methamphetamine, it causes rapid dopamine release. Mephedrone has been found to be a full releaser of serotonin but a partial releaser of dopamine.

In addition to induction of monoamine release via the monoamine transporters, mephedrone shows significant affinity for various receptors, including the serotonin 5-HT_{2A}, 5-HT_{2B}, 5-HT_{2C}, and α_{2}-adrenergic receptors, as well as the trace amine-associated receptor 1 (TAAR1). Mephedrone is a potent and near-full agonist of the serotonin 5-HT_{2A} receptor, whereas it was inactive as an agonist of the serotonin 5-HT_{2B} receptor. Mephedrone binds to and activates the rat and mouse TAAR1 with micromolar potencies, but is not an agonist of the human TAAR1 (EC_{50} > 30 μM).

Mephedrone administration leads to increased extracellular dopamine in the nucleus accumbens, elevated serotonin levels in the frontal cortex, and alterations in brain temperature. These pharmacodynamic actions translate into various behavioral effects, including increased locomotor activity, rewarding effects (as measured by conditioned place preference), and potential for drug discrimination (similar to cocaine and MDMA).

=== Pharmacokinetics ===
Mephedrone is rapidly absorbed and eliminated in humans. After oral or intranasal administration, peak plasma concentrations are typically reached within 0.5 to 1 hour. The drug crosses the blood-brain barrier easily, with a brain-to-plasma ratio of approximately 1.85 in rats. It has a relatively short half-life of approximately 2 hours in plasma and whole blood. The drug and its metabolites can be detected in whole blood and plasma for up to 6 hours post-administration, with some metabolites persisting longer.

Mephedrone exhibits enantioselective pharmacokinetics. The R-(+) enantiomer shows higher peak concentrations and a longer half-life compared to the S-(-) enantiomer. The absolute bioavailability of mephedrone is relatively low, at about 10% in rats, suggesting a significant first-pass effect. The percentage of mephedrone bound to plasma proteins is approximately 22%.

These pharmacokinetic properties contribute to mephedrone's rapid onset of action, short duration of effects, and the tendency for users to engage in repeated dosing to maintain the desired effects.

==== Metabolism ====
Mephedrone undergoes extensive metabolism, primarily through the cytochrome P450 2D6 (CYP2D6) enzyme.

The main phase I metabolic pathways include N-demethylation, reduction of the ketone moiety, and oxidation of the tolyl group. Key metabolites identified in human plasma and urine include nor-mephedrone, dihydro-mephedrone, hydroxytolyl-mephedrone, and 4-carboxy-mephedrone, with 4-carboxy-mephedrone being the most abundant.

Based on the analysis of rat and human urine by gas chromatography and mass spectrometry, mephedrone is thought to be metabolised by three phase 1 pathways. It can be demethylated to the primary amine (producing compounds 2, 3 and 5), the ketone group can be reduced (producing 3), or the tolyl group can be oxidised (producing 6). Both 5 and 6 are thought to be further metabolised by conjugation to the glucuronide and sulfate derivatives. Knowledge of the primary routes of metabolism should allow the intake of mephedrone to be confirmed by drug tests, as well as more accurate determination of the causes of side effects and potential for toxicity.

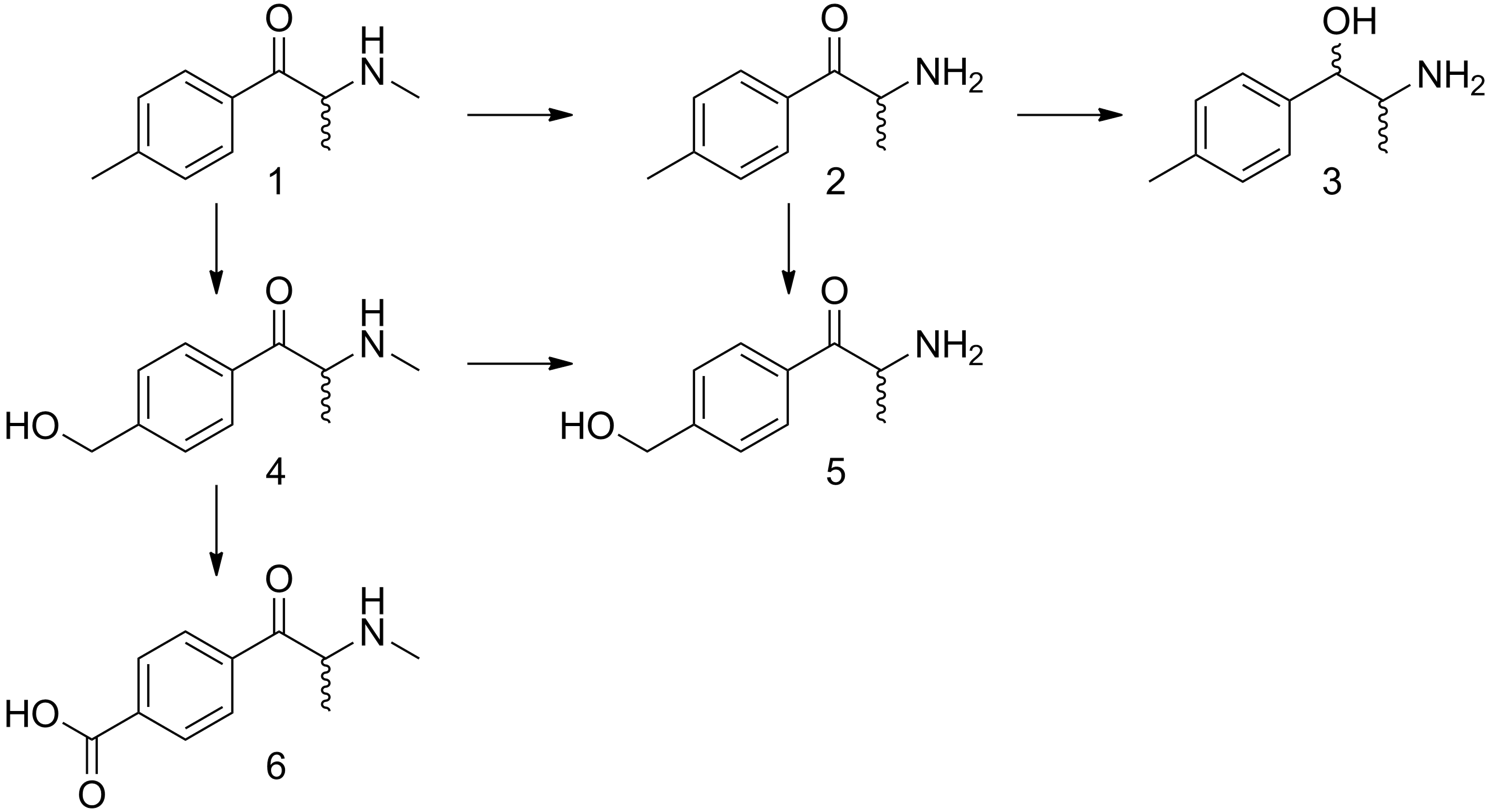
Proposed scheme for the metabolism of mephedrone (1) based on the analysis of rat and human urine

== Chemistry ==
=== Appearance and odour ===
Mephedrone is a white substance. It is sold most commonly as crystals or a powder, but also in the form of capsules or pills. It can have a distinctive odour, reported to range the smell of vanilla and bleach, stale urine, or electric circuit boards. Synthesis byproducts or other contaminants are likely responsible for this, as the molecule itself is not an odorant.

=== Synthesis ===
Mephedrone can be synthesised in several ways. The simplest method, due to the availability of the compounds, is to add 4-methylpropiophenone dissolved in glacial acetic acid to bromine, creating an oil fraction of 4'-methyl-2-bromopropiophenone. The oil fraction can then be dissolved in dichloromethane (CH_{2}Cl_{2}) and drops of the solution added to another solution of CH_{2}Cl_{2}-containing methylamine hydrochloride and triethylamine. Hydrochloric acid (HCl) is then added and the aqueous layer is removed and turned alkaline using sodium hydroxide before the amine is extracted using CH_{2}Cl_{2}. The CH_{2}Cl_{2} is then evaporated using a vacuum, creating an oil which is then dissolved in a nonaqueous ether. Finally, HCl gas is bubbled through the mixture to produce 4-methylmethcathinone hydrochloride. This method produces a mixture of both enantiomers and requires similar knowledge to that required to synthesise amphetamines and MDMA.

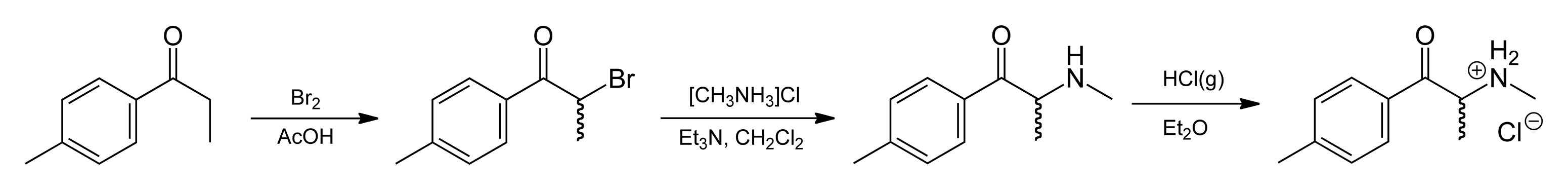
Mephedrone synthesis scheme from 4-methylpropiophenone

It can also be produced by oxidising the ephedrine analogue 4-methylephedrine using potassium permanganate dissolved in sulfuric acid. Because 4-methylephedrine can be obtained in a specific enantiomeric form, mephedrone consisting of only one enantiomer can be produced. The danger associated with this method is it may cause manganese poisoning if the product is not correctly purified.

=== Analysis ===
Mephedrone does not react with most reagent testing kits. The exception is the Liebermann reagent, which gives a bright yellow reaction.

=== Detection in body fluids ===
Mephedrone may be quantitated in blood, plasma or urine by gas chromatography-mass spectrometry or liquid chromatography-mass spectrometry to confirm a diagnosis of poisoning in hospitalised patients or to provide evidence in a medicolegal death investigation. Blood or plasma mephedrone concentrations are expected to be in a range of 50–100 μg/L in persons using the drug recreationally, >100 μg/L in intoxicated patients and >500 μg/L in victims of acute overdosage.

== History ==
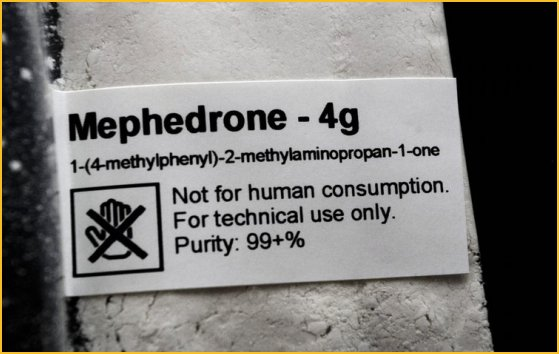
Mephedrone. "Not for human consumption. For technical use only. Purity: 99+ %"

Mephedrone is one of hundreds of designer drugs or legal highs that have been reported in recent years, including artificial chemicals such as synthetic cannabis and semisynthetic substances such as methylhexanamine. These drugs are primarily developed to avoid being controlled by laws against illegal drugs, thus giving them the label of designer drugs. According to the European Monitoring Centre for Drugs and Drug Addiction, the synthesis of mephedrone was first reported in 1929 by Saem de Burnaga Sanchez in the Bulletin de la Société Chimique de France, under the name "toluyl-alpha-monomethylaminoethylcetone", but the compound remained an obscure product of academia until 2003, when it was "re-discovered" and publicised by an underground chemist on The Hive website, registered to a Portuguese IP working under the pseudonym "Kinetic". Kinetic posted on the site, "I've been bored over the last couple of days and had a few fun reagents lying around, so I thought I'd try and make some 1-(4-methylphenyl)-2-methylaminopropanone hydrochloride, or 4-methylmethcathinone." before going on to describe that after consuming it, the user had a "fantastic sense of well-being that I haven't got from any drug before except my beloved Ecstasy." After the initial description of mephedrone's qualitative effects by Kinetic, the drug was commercially introduced in Israel by a mathematician named Ezekiel Golan or "Dr. Z".

A drug similar to mephedrone, containing cathinone, was sold legally in Israel from around 2004, under the name hagigat. When this was made illegal, the cathinone was modified, and the new products were sold by the Israeli company Neorganics. The products had names such as Neodoves pills, but the range was discontinued in January 2008 after the Israeli government made mephedrone illegal. The Psychonaut Research Project, an EU organisation that searches the internet for information regarding new drugs, first identified mephedrone in 2008. Their research suggested the drug first became available to purchase on the internet in 2007, made available through British contacts, contact unknown, when it was also discussed on internet forums. Mephedrone was first seized in France in May 2007, after police sent a tablet they assumed to be ecstasy to be analysed, with the discovery published in a paper titled "Is 4-methylephedrone, an "Ecstasy" of the twenty-first century?" Mephedrone was reported as having been sold as ecstasy in the Australian city of Cairns, along with ethylcathinone, in 2008. An annual survey of regular ecstasy users in Australia in 2010 found 21% of those surveyed had used mephedrone, with 17% having done so in the previous six months. The price they paid per gram varied from A$16 to $320.

Europol noted they became aware of it in 2008, after it was found in Denmark, Finland and the UK. The Drug Enforcement Administration noted it was present in the United States in July 2009. By May 2010, mephedrone had been detected in all 22 EU member states that reported to Europol, as well as in Croatia and Norway. The Daily Telegraph reported in April 2009 that it was manufactured in China, but it has since been made illegal there. In March 2009, Druglink magazine reported it only cost a "couple of hundred pounds" to synthesise a kilogram of mephedrone, the same month, The Daily Telegraph reported manufacturers were making "huge amounts of money" from selling it. In January 2010, Druglink magazine reported dealers in Britain spent £2,500 to ship one kilogram from China, but could sell it for £10 a gram, making a profit of £7,500. A later report, in March 2010, stated the wholesale price of mephedrone was £4000 per kilogram.

In March 2011, the International Narcotics Control Board published a report about designer drugs, noting mephedrone was by then being used recreationally in Europe, North America, Southeast Asia, New Zealand and Australia.

After the 2022 Russian invasion of Ukraine, existing street drugs in Russia became more expensive, leading an increasing number of Russians to turn to mephedrone. According to reports, DIY mephedrone-making kits are widely available in the country.

=== United Kingdom ===
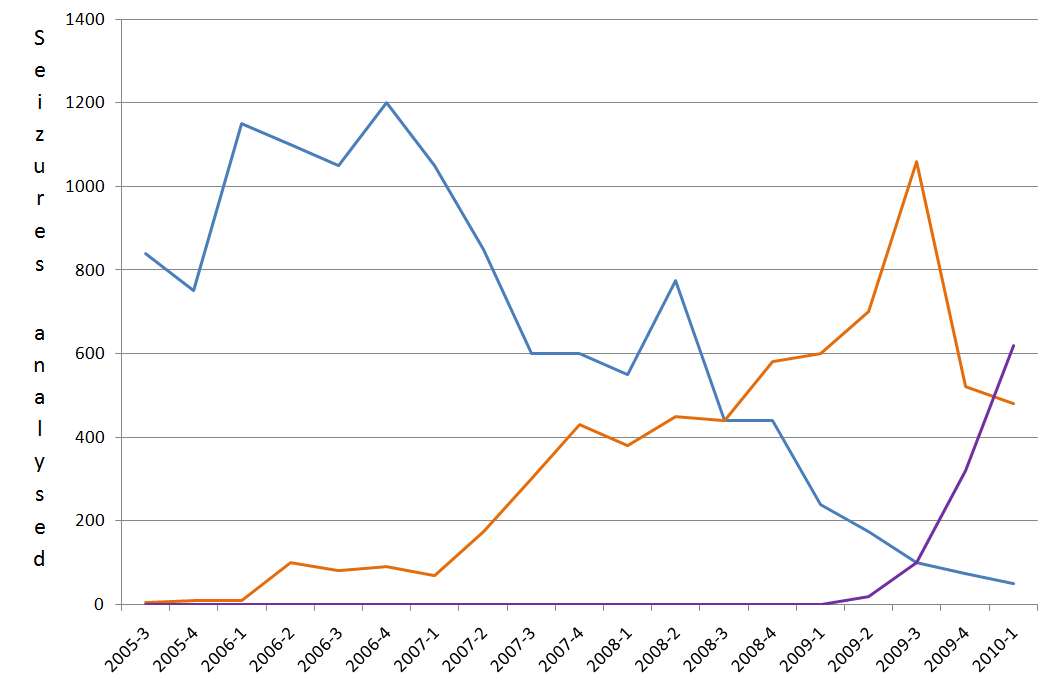
The number of samples analysed by the Forensic Science Service of seized MDMA, piperazines and cathinones between the third quarter of 2005 and the first quarter of 2010: MDMA seizures in blue, piperazine seizures in orange and cathinone seizures in purple

Between the summer of 2009 and March 2010, the use of mephedrone grew rapidly in the UK, with it becoming readily available at music festivals, head shops and on the internet. A survey of Mixmag readers in 2009, found it was the fourth most popular street drug in the United Kingdom, behind cannabis, cocaine, and ecstasy. The drug was used by a diverse range of social groups. Whilst the evidence was anecdotal, researchers, charity workers, teachers and users reported widespread and increasing use of the drug in 2009. The drug's rapid growth in popularity was believed to be related to both its availability and legality. In a book about drugs David Nutt reports the re-popularization story of mephedrone in a way that can be cross referenced with a report by Chemistry World in an article.

Fiona Measham, a criminologist at the University of Lancaster, thought the emergence of mephedrone was also related to the decreasing purity of ecstasy and cocaine on sale in the UK, a view reinforced in a report by the National Treatment Agency for Substance Misuse. The average cocaine purity fell from 60% in 1999 to 22% in 2009 and about half of ecstasy pills seized in 2009 contained no MDMA, and by June 2010 almost all ecstasy pills seized in the UK contained no MDMA. A similar pattern was observed in the Netherlands, with the number of ecstasy tablets containing no MDMA rising from 10% in mid-2008 to 60% by mid-2009, with mephedrone being detected in 20% of ecstasy tablets by mid-2009. The decrease of MDMA was thought to be partly due to the seizure of 33 tonnes of sassafras oil, the precursor to MDMA, in Cambodia in June 2008, which could have been used to make 245 million doses of MDMA. According to John Ramsey, a toxicologist at St George's, University of London, the emergence of mephedrone was also related to the UK government banning the benzylpiperazine class of drugs in December 2009. gamma-Butyrolactone (GBL), another previously "legal high", was also banned in August 2009 despite concerns it would be replaced by other drugs.

By December 2009, mephedrone was available on at least 31 websites based in the UK, and by March 2010, there were at least 78 online shops, half of which sold amounts of less than 200 grams and half that also sold bulk quantities. The price per gram varied from £9.50 to £14. Between July 2009 and February 2010, UK health professionals accessed the National Poisons Information Service's (NPIS) entry on mephedrone 1664 times and made 157 telephone inquiries; the requests increased month on month over this period. In comparison, over a similar time period, the entries for cocaine and MDMA were accessed approximately 2400 times. After mephedrone was made illegal, the number of inquiries to the NPIS fell substantially, to only 19 in June 2010.

Media organisations, including the BBC and The Guardian, incorrectly reported mephedrone was commonly used as a plant fertiliser. In fact, sellers of the drug described it as "plant food" because it was illegal to sell the compound for human consumption. In late 2009, UK newspapers began referring to the drug as meow or miaow (sometimes doubled as meow meow or miaow miaow), a name that was almost unknown on the street at the time. In November 2009, the tabloid newspaper, The Sun published a story stating that a man had ripped off his own scrotum whilst using mephedrone. The story was later shown to be an online joke posted on mephedrone.com and later included in a police report, with the caveat that it could be unreliable. The police report was used as a source for the story in The Sun. Other myths the media often repeated during 2010 were that mephedrone had led to the deaths of over 20 people, teachers were unable to confiscate the drug from pupils, and the government was too slow to ban the drug. Parallels were drawn between the media coverage of mephedrone and a piece of satire by Chris Morris in 1997 on Brass Eye when he tricked public figures into talking of the dangers of taking the fictional legal drug "cake". The Advisory Council on the Misuse of Drugs (ACMD) have suggested that the media coverage of the drug led to its increased usage. Jon Silverman, a former BBC Home Affairs Correspondent, has written two articles discussing how the media had a strong influence over the UK government's drugs policy, particularly in that the government wished to demonstrate they were being "tough" on drugs.

A survey of 1000 secondary school pupils and university students in Tayside, conducted in February 2010, found that 20% had previously taken mephedrone. Although it was legally available online at the time, only 10% of users reported purchasing it online, with most buying from street dealers. Of those who had used mephedrone, 97% said it was easy or very easy to obtain. Around 50% of users reported at least one negative effect associated with the use of mephedrone, of which teeth grinding is the most common. Detailed interviews with users in Northern Ireland similarly found that few purchased mephedrone online, with most interviewees citing concerns that their address would be traced or that family members could intercept the package.

On 30 March 2010, Alan Johnson, the then Home Secretary, announced mephedrone would be made illegal "within weeks" after the ACMD sent him a report on the use of cathinones. The legislation would make all cathinones illegal, which Johnson said would "stop unscrupulous manufacturers and others peddling different but similarly harmful drugs". The ACMD had run into problems with the UK Government in 2009 regarding drugs policy, after the government did not follow the advice of the ACMD to reclassify ecstasy and cannabis, culminating in the dismissal of the ACMD chairman, David Nutt, after he reiterated the ACMD's findings in an academic lecture. Several members resigned after he was sacked, and prior to the announcement that mephedrone was to be banned, the trend continued when Dr Polly Taylor resigned, saying she "did not have trust" in the way the government would use the advice given by the ACMD. Eric Carlin, a member of the ACMD and former chairman of the English Drug Education Forum, also resigned after the announcement. He said the decision by the Home Secretary was "unduly based on media and political pressure" and there was "little or no discussion about how our recommendation to classify this drug would be likely to impact on young people's behaviour." Some former members of the ACMD and various charity groups expressed concern over the banning of the drug, arguing it would inevitably criminalise users, particularly young people. Others expressed concern that the drug would be left in the hands of black market dealers, who will only compound the problem. Carlin's resignation was specifically linked to the criminalisation of mephedrone; he stated: "We need to review our entire approach to drugs, dumping the idea that legally-sanctioned punishments for drug users should constitute a main part of the armoury in helping to solve our country's drug problems. We need to stop harming people who need help and support".

The parliamentary debate was held on 8 April, one day after the 2010 general election had been announced, meaning it was during the so-called "wash-up period" when legislation is passed with little scrutiny. Only one hour was spent debating the ban, and all three parties agreed, meaning no vote was required. In an interview conducted in July 2010, when he was no longer a minister, Johnson admitted the decision to ban mephedrone was sped up after widespread reporting of deaths caused by the drug, and because the government wished to pass the law before parliament was dissolved prior to the upcoming general election. In January 2011, however, Johnson told the Scunthorpe Telegraph that the decision was based only on information from the ACMD. An editorial in the April 2010 edition of The Lancet questioned the decision to ban mephedrone, saying the ACMD did not have enough evidence to judge the potential harms caused by mephedrone and arguing that policy makers should have sought to understand why young people took it and how they could be influenced not to take it. Evan Harris, then the Liberal Democrat science spokesman, stated the ACMD "was not 'legally constituted'" as required by the Misuse of Drugs Act, when the report on cathinones was published, since after Taylor resigned, it lacked a veterinary surgeon. In the rush to make mephedrone illegal, the act that was passed specified the inactive enantiomer of mephedrone, leaving the active form legal until the loophole was closed in February 2011 by another act of parliament. In Chemistry World, John Mann, professor of chemistry at Queen's University Belfast, suggested the UK create a law similar to the Federal Analog Act of the United States, which would have made mephedrone illegal as an analog of cathinone. In August 2010, James Brokenshire, the Home Office drugs minister, announced plans to create a new category in the Misuse of Drugs Act, through the Police Reform and Social Responsibility Bill, that would allow new legal highs to be made temporarily illegal, without the need for a vote in parliament or advice from the ACMD, as was required to categorise mephedrone.

According to the Independent Scientific Committee on Drugs, after mephedrone was made illegal, a street trade in the drug emerged, with prices around double those prior to the ban, at £20–£25 per gram. In September 2010, Druglink reported the ban had a mixed effect on mephedrone use, with it decreasing in some areas, remaining similar in others, and becoming more prevalent in some areas. In an online survey of 150 users after the ban, 63% said they were continuing to use mephedrone; of those, half claimed unchanged usage amounts (as to dosage and frequency), and half claimed decreased usage. Compared to previous surveys, more users purchased it from dealers, rather than the internet. The average price per gram was £16, compared to around £10 before the ban. The 2010 Mixmag survey of 2,500 nightclubbers found one quarter had used mephedrone in the previous month, the price had roughly doubled since it was made illegal, and it was more likely to be cut with other substances. Of those who had already used mephedrone prior to the ban, 75% had continued to use it after the ban. Of the various drugs used by the survey participants, users were more likely to have concerns about it. Interviews with users in Northern Ireland also found the price had roughly doubled since it was made illegal, to around £30 a gram. Rather than the price rising due to increased scarcity of the drug, it is thought to have risen for two other reasons. Firstly, dealers knew there was still demand for mephedrone, but were aware that the supplies might be exhausted in the future. Secondly, the dealers perceived that customers were likely to pay more for an illegal substance.

Professor Shiela Bird, a statistician at the Medical Research Council, suggested the ban of mephedrone may lead to more cocaine-related deaths. In the first six months of 2009, the number of cocaine-related deaths fell for the first time in four years, and fewer soldiers tested positive for cocaine in 2009 than in 2008. She suggested this may have been due to users switching to mephedrone from cocaine, but cautioned that before full figures are available for 2009 and 2010, it will be difficult to determine whether mephedrone saved lives, rather than cost them. Other supposedly legal drugs have filled the gap in the market since mephedrone was made illegal, including naphyrone (NRG-1) (since made illegal) and Ivory Wave, which has been found to contain MDPV, a compound made illegal at the same time as mephedrone. However, some products branded as Ivory Wave possibly do not contain MDPV. When tested, some products sold six weeks after mephedrone was banned, advertised as NRG-1, NRG-2 and MDAI, were found to be mephedrone. A Drugscope survey of drug workers at the end of 2012 reported that mephedrone use was still widespread in the UK and that there were increasing reports of problematic users. It was being taken as not only a "poor man's cocaine" but also amongst users of heroin and crack cocaine. Cases of intravenous use were also reported to be on the increase.

== Society and culture ==
=== Legal status ===
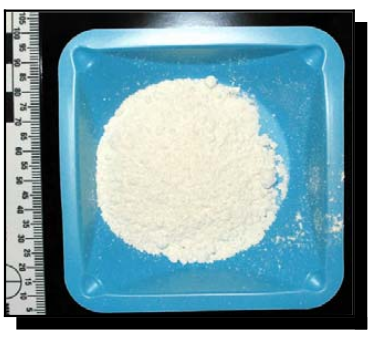
A sample of mephedrone that was confiscated in Oregon, US, 2009

When mephedrone was rediscovered in 2003, it was not specifically illegal to possess in any country. As its use has increased, many countries have passed legislation making its possession, sale and manufacture illegal. It was first made illegal in Israel, where it had been found in products such as Neodoves pills, in January 2008. After the death of a young woman in Sweden in December 2008 was linked to the use of mephedrone, it was classified as a hazardous substance a few days later, making it illegal to sell in Sweden. In June 2009, it was classified as a narcotic with the possession of 15 grams or more resulting in a minimum of two years in prison—a longer sentence, gram for gram than given for the possession of cocaine or heroin. In December 2008, Denmark also made it illegal and through the Medicines Act of Finland, it was made illegal to possess without a prescription. In November 2009, it was classified as a "narcotic or psychotropic" substance and added to the list of controlled substances in Estonia and made illegal to import into Guernsey along with other legal highs, before being classified as a Class B drug in April 2010. It was classified as a Class C drug in Jersey in December 2009.

In 2010, as its use became more prevalent, many countries passed legislation prohibiting mephedrone. It became illegal in Croatia and Germany in January, followed by Romania and the Isle of Man in February. In March 2010, it was classified as an unregulated medicine in the Netherlands, making the sale and distribution of it illegal. The importation of mephedrone into the UK was banned on 29 March 2010. The next day, the ACMD in the UK published a report on the cathinones, including mephedrone, and recommended they be classified as Class B drugs. On 7 April 2010, the Misuse of Drugs Act 1971 (Amendment) Order 2010 was passed by parliament, making mephedrone and other substituted cathinones, Class B drugs from 16 April 2010. Prior to the ban taking effect, mephedrone was not covered by the Misuse of Drugs Act 1971. It was, though, an offence under the Medicines Act to sell it for human consumption, so it was often sold as "plant food" or "bath salts", although it has no use as these products; this, too, was possibly illegal under the Trade Descriptions Act 1968. In the US, similar descriptions have been used to describe mephedrone, as well as methylenedioxypyrovalerone (MDPV). In May 2010, the Republic of Ireland made mephedrone illegal, followed by Belgium, Italy, Lithuania, France and Norway in June and Russia in July. In August 2010, Austria and Poland made it illegal and China announced it would be illegal as of 1 September 2010. Mephedrone had been reported to be used in Singapore in February 2010, but it was made illegal in November 2010. In December 2010, following the advice of the EMCDDA, mephedrone was made illegal throughout the EU, a move Switzerland also made shortly afterwards. Countries which have not already banned it, such as the Netherlands, Greece and Portugal, will need to change legislation to comply with the EU ruling. In Hungary, a government advisory body recommended mephedrone should be made illegal in August 2010, which was followed, making it illegal in January 2011; Spain followed in February 2011. Mexico, by decree, outlawed mephedrone as a substance "with low or no therapeutical use which pose[s] a serious threat to public health" in 2014.

In some countries, mephedrone is not specifically listed as illegal, but is controlled under legislation that makes compounds illegal if they are analogs of drugs already listed. In Australia during 2010, it was not specifically listed as prohibited, but the Australian Federal Police stated it is an analogue to methcathinone and therefore illegal. It is now listed as a Schedule 9 prohibited substance in Australia under the Poisons Standard (October 2015). A Schedule 9 substance is a substance which may be abused or misused, the manufacture, possession, sale or use of which should be prohibited by law except when required for medical or scientific research, or for analytical, teaching or training purposes with approval of Commonwealth and/or State or Territory Health Authorities. In February 2010, 22 men were arrested in connection with importing mephedrone. By January 2011, every state in Australia, other than Victoria, had listed it as a controlled drug.

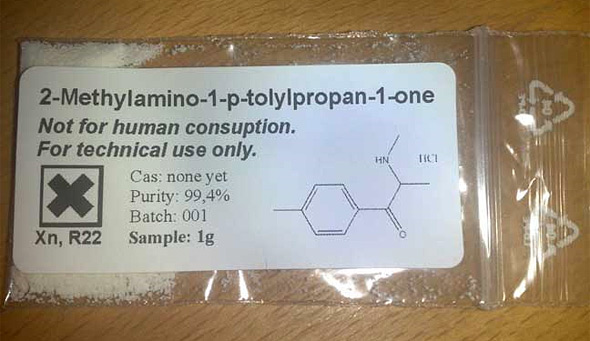
1 gram of mephedrone, bought in Russia

In New Zealand, it is not included in the Misuse of Drugs Act 1975, but is illegal, as it is similar to controlled substances.

In Canada, mephedrone is not explicitly listed in any schedule of the Controlled Drugs and Substances Act, but "amphetamines, their salts, derivatives, isomers and analogues and salts of derivatives, isomers and analogues" are included in Section 19 of Schedule I of the act. Cathinone and methcathinone are listed in separate sections of Schedule III, while diethylpropion and pyrovalerone (also cathinones), are listed in separate sections of Schedule IV, each without language to capture analogues, isomers, etc. Mephedrone is considered a controlled substance by Health Canada. In a report by the Canadian Medical Association in 2010, one lawyer was quoted as suggesting that mephedrone was less popular in Canada than in the U.K. because "there's a provision in the substance act that says analogues of certain drugs and other similar drugs may be illegal too,"; on the other hand, the assistant director of the Centre for Addictions Research of British Columbia suggested there was a lack of "clear illegality". There have been several media reports of the Canadian police seizing mephedrone, but no reports of any successful prosecution of a Controlled Drugs and Substances Act offence implicating mephedrone.

Mephedrone is also currently scheduled in the United States as of 2011. The Drug Enforcement Administration (DEA) states, as an analogue of methcathinone, possession of mephedrone can be controlled by the Federal Analog Act, but according to the Los Angeles Times, this only applies if it is sold for human consumption. Several cities and states, such as New York state, have passed legislation to specifically list mephedrone as illegal, but in most areas it remained legal, so long as it is not sold for human consumption, so retailers described it as 'bath salts'. In September 2011, The DEA began using its emergency scheduling authority to temporarily control mephedrone. Except as authorised by law, this action made possessing and selling mephedrone or the products that contain it illegal in the US for at least one year while the DEA and the United States Department of Health and Human Services conduct further study. Control of these compounds became permanent on 9 July 2012, via passage of the Synthetic Drug Abuse Prevention Act of 2012.

=== Usage ===
A survey conducted in late 2009 by the National Addiction Centre (UK) found 41.3% of readers of Mixmag had used mephedrone in the last month, making it the fourth-most popular drug amongst clubbers. Of those, two-thirds snorted the drug and the average dosage per session was 0.9 g; the length of sessions increased as the dosage increased. Users who snorted the drug reported using more per session than those who took it orally (0.97 g compared to 0.74 g) and also reported using it more often (five days per month compared to three days per month). An Irish study of people on a methadone treatment program for heroin addicts found 29 of 209 patients tested positive for mephedrone usage.

=== Harm assessment ===
Professor David Nutt, former chair of the Advisory Council on the Misuse of Drugs (ACMD) in the UK has said in 2009, "people are better off taking ecstasy or amphetamines than those [drugs] we know nothing about" and "Who knows what's in [mephedrone] when you buy it? We don't have a testing system. It could be very dangerous[;] we just don't know. These chemicals have never been put into animals, let alone humans." Les King, a former member of the ACMD, has stated mephedrone appears to be less potent than amphetamine and ecstasy, but that any benefit associated with this could be negated by users taking larger amounts. He also told the BBC, "all we can say is [mephedrone] is probably as harmful as ecstasy and amphetamines and wait until we have some better scientific evidence to support that."

== See also ==
- Bath salts
- 3-Methylmethcathinone
- 4-Methylamphetamine
- 4-Methylbuphedrone
- 4-Methylcathinone
- 4-Methylpentedrone
- 4-Methylthioamphetamine
- Methylenedioxyamphetamine
- Methamphetamine
- para-Methoxyamphetamine
