= C13H19NO =

The molecular formula C_{13}H_{19}NO (molar mass: 205.30 g/mol) may refer to:

- Amfepramone
- Dimethylaminopivalophenone
- N-Ethylpentedrone
- 4-Methylpentedrone
