= Catherine Harmer =

British researcher

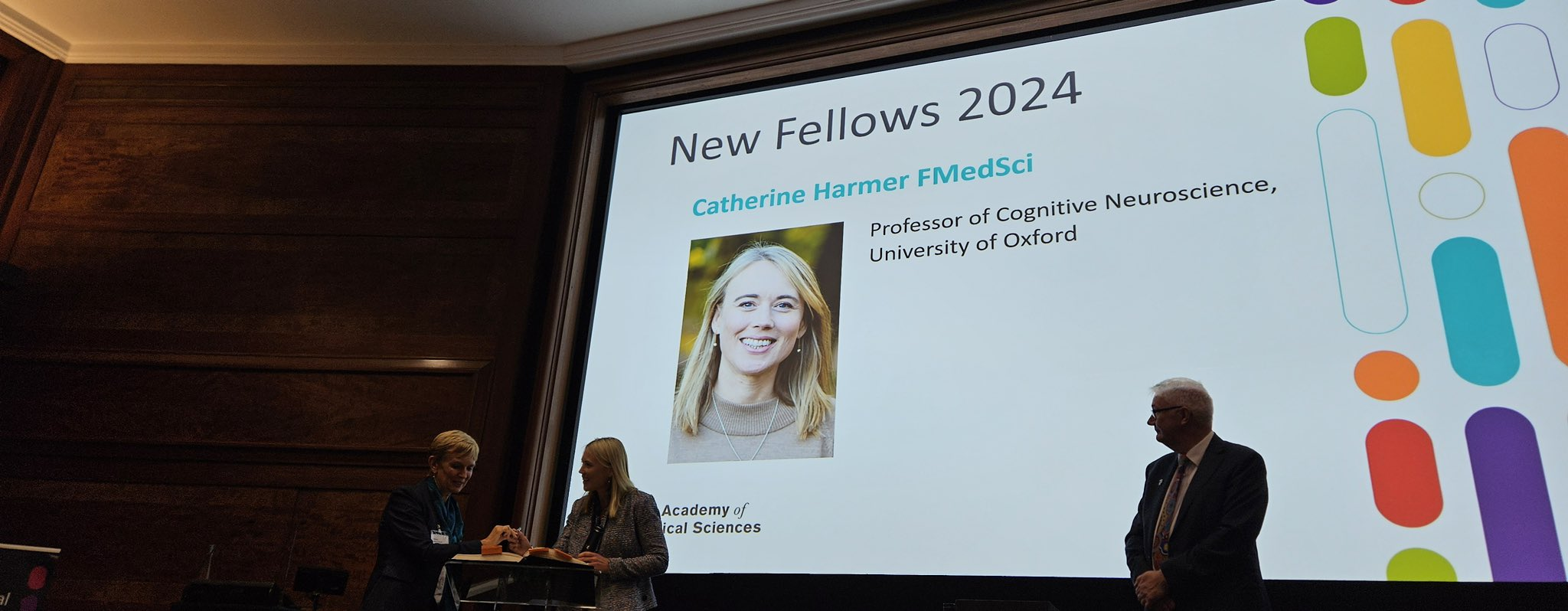
Catherine Harmer admitted as new fellow of Academy of Medical Sciences, 2024

Catherine Jane Harmer is a British cognitive neuroscientist and Professor of Cognitive Neuroscience at the University of Oxford Department of Psychiatry. She is known for her work on the neuropsychopharmacology of emotion and depression, particularly in identifying how antidepressant medications affect emotional processing before changes in mood become evident. She is a Fellow of the Academy of Medical Sciences, Director of the Oxford Psychopharmacology and Emotion Research Laboratory (PERL) and Associate Head of Department of Psychiatry University of Oxford.

== Career ==
Harmer obtained her DPhil from the University of York, where she focused on mechanisms underpinning drug addiction. She moved to Oxford in 1998 to begin a postdoctoral research position and was later funded by a Medical Research Council training fellowship. Harmer was the founding member of the Psychopharmacology and Emotion Research Lab (PERL). She became a full Professor in 2010 and Associate Head of Department in 2021. Harmer is also a fellow of Corpus Christi College.

Harmer is known for her work on early mechanisms of antidepressant drug action where her work has had a considerable impact on understanding and developing novel treatments in depression, developing biomarkers of treatment efficacy and identifying novel therapeutic targets for depression

Harmer is the current president of the British Association for Psychopharmacology (2024-2026) and a fellow of the European College of Neuropsychopharmacology. She has served as the treasurer on the Executive Committee of the European College of Neuropsychopharmacology from 2019 to 2022, and for the British Neuroscience Association from 2018-2021. Harmer is an Associate editor of Psychological Medicine (2018), she also sits on the editorial boards of Biological Psychiatry, Biological Psychiatry: Cognitive Neuroscience and Neuroimaging and the Journal of Psychopharmacology.

Beyond her academic work, Harmer is an active science communicator, contributing to media outlets on the evolution of mental health treatments. In the BBC Radio 4 series ‘Is Psychiatry Working?’ and ‘Made of Stronger Stuff,’ she discusses effectiveness of modern psychiatric treatments and recovery mechanisms, and explores Serotonin and challenges the “chemical imbalance” narrative of depression. She appears in University of Oxford podcasts discussing emotional processing in depression and developments in treating it.

== Research ==
Harmer developed a model showing that antidepressants change how people process emotional information before mood begins to improve. This connects to biological and psychological views of depression treatment. In her 2003 study, a single dose of reboxetine made healthy volunteers focus more on positive information shortly after taking it, even though their mood didn't change. This finding shows that medication and therapy work by changing the same emotional processing patterns.

In 2019, Harmer was the principal investigator in a study establishing an experimental model for developing effective antidepressant treatments, using ketamine as a reference drug. The study examined treatment-resistant depression and control participants, noting ketamine’s positive effects via the glutamate system as well as its significant side effects. Hence, the study recommends that future trials use ketamine’s effects as mechanistic benchmarks while focusing on drugs with ketamine-like properties rather than ketamine itself.

In July 2021, Harmer was involved in the launch of the Experimental Medicine Industry Partnership (EMIP), an NIHR Biomedical Research Centre initiative linking academia and industry for experimental medicine. It was launched during an Academic Industry Meeting Day (AIMday), hosted by researchers from Oxford Health BRC. The event brought together 90 academic researchers and 50 representatives from 15 industry partners. EMIP enables BRC researchers to support commercial organisations in applying experimental medicine approaches to psychiatric treatment development.
