= 4-Methylephedrine =

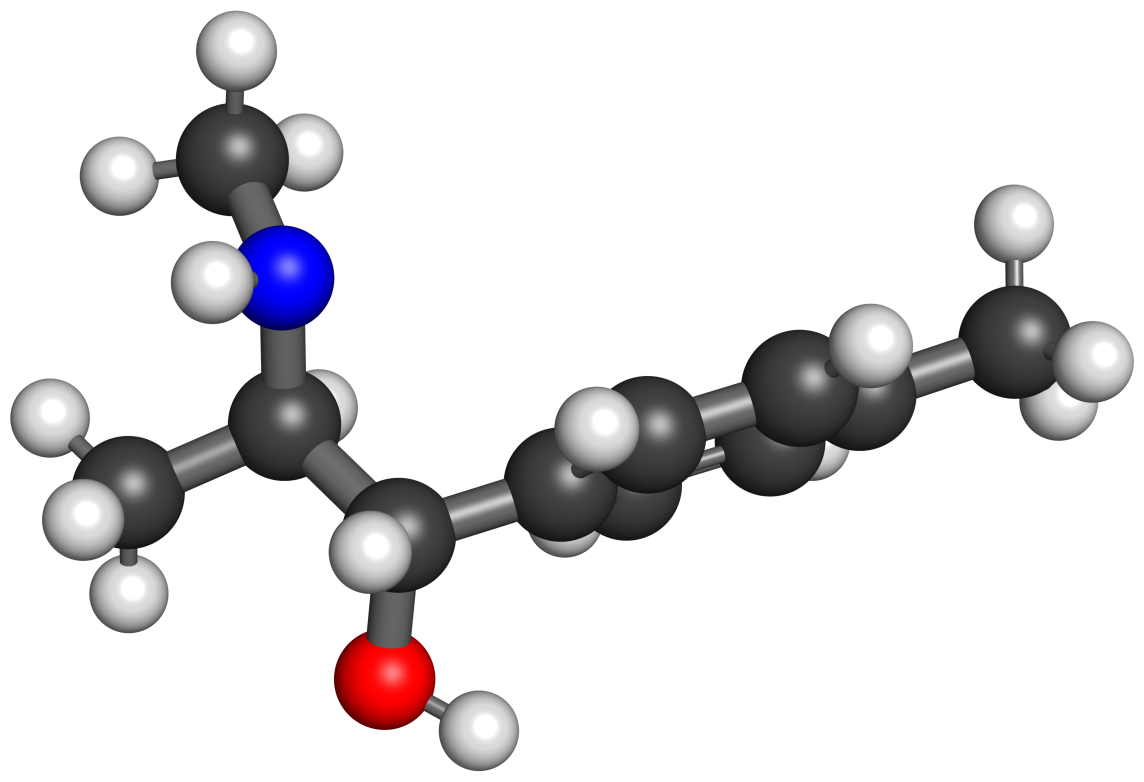

Clinical data
- Pronunciation: /ˌfɔːr mɛθəlɪˈfɛdrɪn/
- Other names: 4-ME; Dihydromephedrone; DHMMC; β-Hydroxy-4-methylmethamphetamine; 4-Methyl-β-hydroxymethamphetamine
- Drug class: Stimulant; Monoamine releasing agent
- ATC code: None

Legal status
- Legal status: Generally not controlled

Identifiers
- IUPAC name: 2-(methylamino)-1-(4-methylphenyl)propan-1-ol
- CAS Number: 27465-54-9
- PubChem CID: 76974179
- ChemSpider: 26701087
- UNII: L5YAA08T2B
- CompTox Dashboard (EPA): DTXSID701342436

Chemical and physical data
- Formula: C_{11}H_{17}NO
- Molar mass: 179.263 g·mol^{−1}
- 3D model (JSmol): Interactive image
- Density: 0.987 to 1.00 g/cm^{3}
- Melting point: 56.1 to 89.0 °C (133.0 to 192.2 °F)
- Boiling point: 269 to 281 °C (516 to 538 °F)
- Solubility in water: 1.61e-2 to 0.110 (water) mg/mL (20 °C)
- SMILES: CC1=CC=C(C=C1)C(C(C)NC)O
- InChI: InChI=1S/C11H17NO/c1-8-4-6-10(7-5-8)11(13)9(2)12-3/h4-7,9,11-13H,1-3H3; Key:DUESQFQLBNOCIT-UHFFFAOYSA-N

4-Methylephedrine (4-ME), also known as dihydromephedrone (DHMMC) or as β-hydroxy-4-methylmethamphetamine, is a putative stimulant drug of the phenethylamine, amphetamine, and β-hydroxyamphetamine families. It is the β-hydroxy analogue of mephedrone and is a known metabolite of mephedrone. The drug acts as a monoamine reuptake inhibitor and monoamine releasing agent, albeit with relatively low potency and far less than that of mephedrone.

== Pharmacology ==
=== Pharmacodynamics ===
4-Methylephedrine acts as a monoamine reuptake inhibitor and monoamine releasing agent in vitro, with potency far lower than that of its parent drug mephedrone.

The drug is a weak reuptake inhibitor of norepinephrine, dopamine, and serotonin, with IC_{50} values of 64.98 μM, 23.97 μM, and 23.53 μM for the serotonin, norepinephrine, and dopamine transporters, respectively. The values for individual enantiomers of 4-methylephedrine have also been reported. In addition, data for induction of monoamine release in the HEK293 system have been reported.

Monoamine reuptake inhibition of 4-methylephedrine and related compounds (IC_{50}, μM)
Compound	NE	DA	SERT	Ref
Dihydromephedrone	23.97	23.53	64.98	
Mephedrone	0.77	2.77	7.83	
Normephedrone	6.35	5.46	10.61	
4-Hydroxymephedrone	2.92	4.85	73.53	
Notes: The smaller the value, the more avidly the drug releases the neurotransmitter.

== See also ==
- Substituted β-hydroxyamphetamine
