= Buphedrone =

Stimulant drug and research chemical

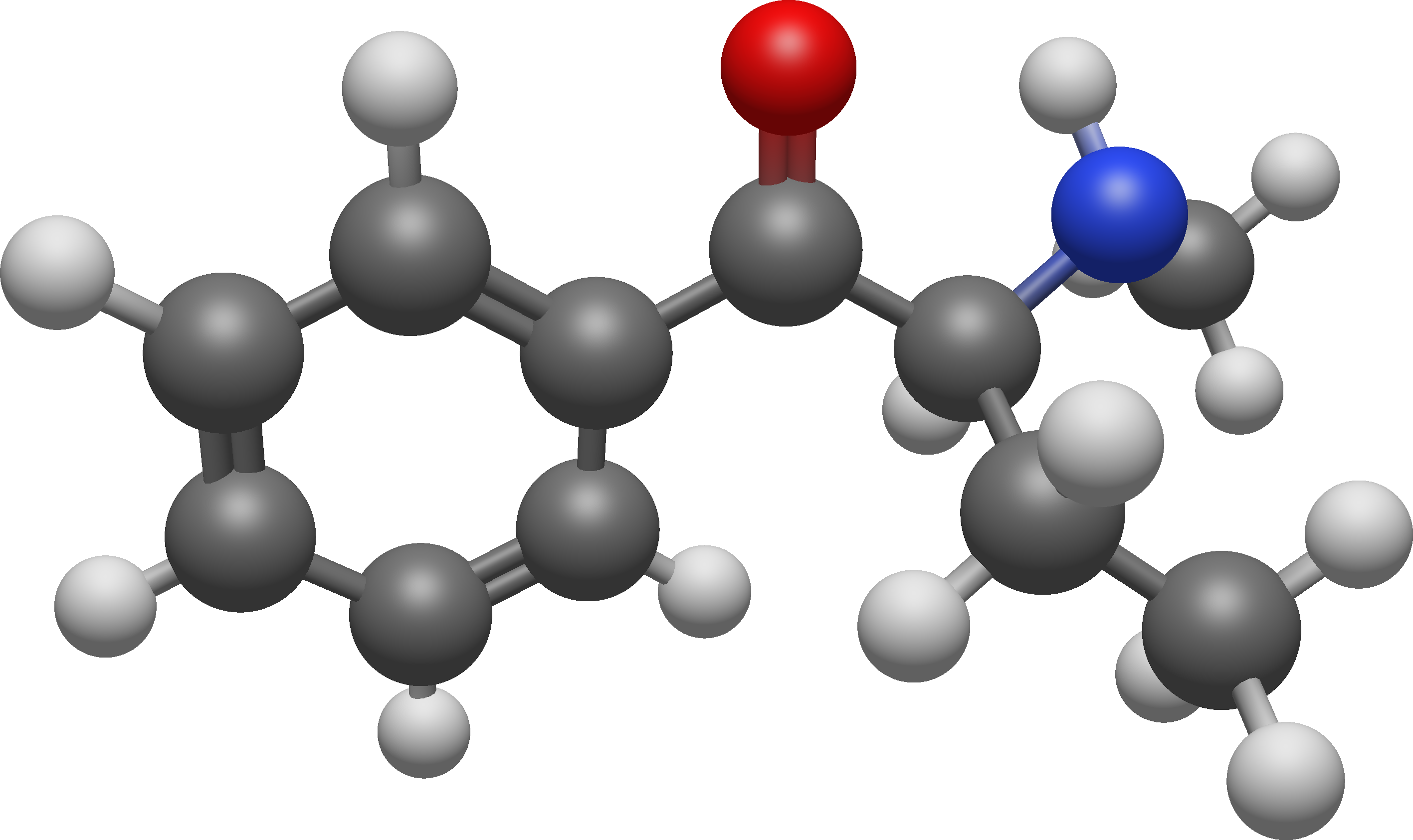

Clinical data
- Trade names: Buphedrone
- Other names: 2-(Methylamino)butanophenone; α-Methylaminobutyrophenone; MABP; NM-BP; PAL-429; PAL429; β-Keto-N-methylphenylisobutylamine; α-Ethyl-β-keto-N-methylphenethylamine; β-Keto-N-methyl-α-ethylphenethylamine; β-Keto-α-ethyl-N-methylphenethylamine
- Routes of administration: Vaporization, insufflation, Intravenous injection, intramuscular injection, orally, rectal, buccal
- ATC code: none

Legal status
- Legal status: DE: Anlage II (Authorized trade only, not prescriptible); UK: Class B; US: Schedule I

Pharmacokinetic data
- Excretion: Urine

Identifiers
- IUPAC name: 2-(methylamino)-1-phenylbutan-1-one
- CAS Number: 408332-79-6 166593-10-8 (hydrochloride)
- PubChem CID: 53249194
- ChemSpider: 26286946
- UNII: VD73947M0O
- CompTox Dashboard (EPA): DTXSID701014170

Chemical and physical data
- Formula: C_{11}H_{15}NO
- Molar mass: 177.247 g·mol^{−1}
- 3D model (JSmol): Interactive image
- SMILES: CNC(CC)C(=O)c1ccccc1
- InChI: InChI=1S/C11H15NO/c1-3-10(12-2)11(13)9-7-5-4-6-8-9/h4-8,10,12H,3H2,1-2H3; Key:DDPMGIMJSRUULN-UHFFFAOYSA-N

Buphedrone, also known as β-keto-N-methylphenylisobutylamine, is a stimulant of the phenethylamine and cathinone chemical classes that was first synthesized in 1928. It is a synthetic analogue of cathinone, a stimulant naturally occurring in the khat plant. Like many other synthetic cathinones (e.g. mephedrone), it is also found in so called "legal highs" (sometimes also called "bath salts"), a class of designer drugs used to bypass legal restrictions.

== Pharmacology ==
Buphedrone is a substituted cathinone, and more broadly related, a substituted amphetamine and substituted phenethylamine and, as such, operates as a norepinephrine-dopamine releasing agent, similar to many of the drugs in its chemical class(es).

== Chemistry ==
Buphedrone is a β-ketone and is related to the naturally occurring compounds cathinone and cathine. It is also related to methamphetamine, differing by the β-ketone substituent (at the β-carbon) and an ethyl group replacing the methyl group at the carbon at the α-position relative to the amine. Another name for buphedrone is phenylacetoethyl-methylamine.

Buphedrone as free base is very unstable; it is prone to dimerization like other α-amino ketones. Because of this, it is sold as various salts, with a hydrochloride being most common.

== Effects ==
Buphedrone increases spontaneous rodent locomotor activity, potentiates the release of dopamine from dopaminergic nerve terminals in the brain, and causes appetite suppression. It also causes a possibly dangerous effect of decreasing subjective feeling of thirst. Though the specific effects and toxicity of buphedrone are not well studied, in general it is expected to have overlapping effects with other synthetic cathinones.

== Legal status ==
As of October 2015, buphedrone is a controlled substance in China.

In Finland buphedrone is scheduled in the "Government decree on psychoactive substances banned from the consumer market".

Buphedrone is an Anlage II controlled drug in Germany.

In the United States, buphedrone is considered a schedule 1 controlled substance as a positional isomer of mephedrone.

== See also ==
- Pentedrone
- 4-Methylbuphedrone
- 4-Methylpentedrone
