= C14H21NO =

The molecular formula C_{14}H_{21}NO may refer to:

- N-Ethylhexedrone (NEH)
- 4-Methyl-α-ethylaminopentiophenone (4-MEAP)
- 3-PPP
- Profadol (CI-572)
- Zylofuramine
- 3-HO-PCE
