= 4-Methylbuphedrone =

Designer stimulant drug

Legal status
- Legal status: DE: Anlage I (Authorized scientific use only); UK: Class B

Identifiers
- IUPAC name: 2-(methylamino)-1-(4-methylphenyl)-1-butanone
- CAS Number: 1337016-51-9
- PubChem CID: 71750237
- ChemSpider: 26702147
- UNII: 4Y78FRB99G
- CompTox Dashboard (EPA): DTXSID001014193

Chemical and physical data
- Formula: C_{12}H_{17}NO
- Molar mass: 191.274 g·mol^{−1}
- 3D model (JSmol): Interactive image
- SMILES: CC1=CC=C(C(C(CC)NC)=O)C=C1.Cl
- InChI: InChI=1S/C12H17NO.ClH/c1-4-11(13-3)12(14)10-7-5-9(2)6-8-10;/h5-8,11,13H,4H2,1-3H3;1H; Key:CNSOPRIVFKVRDH-UHFFFAOYSA-N

4-Methylbuphedrone (also known as 4-MeMABP, BZ-6378 and 4-Methyl-α-methylamino-butyrophenone), is a stimulant drug of the cathinone class that has been sold online as a designer drug.

It was first reported to the EMCDDA in November 2011.

== Legal status ==
4-Methylbuphedrone is listed in Anlage I and therefore illegal in Germany.

As of October 2015 4-MeMABP is a controlled substance in China.

In the United States 4-methylbuphedrone is considered a Schedule I controlled substance as a positional isomer of 4-methylethcathinone (4-MEC).

== See also ==
- 4-Methylcathinone
- 4-Methylethcathinone
- 4-Methylmethcathinone
- 4-Methylpentedrone
- Buphedrone
