= Advisory Council on the Misuse of Drugs =

British non-departmental public body

Agency overview
- Formed: 1971
- Type: Advisory non-departmental public body
- Jurisdiction: United Kingdom
- Minister responsible: Yvette Cooper, Home Secretary
- Agency executive: Dr Owen Bowden-Jones, Chair
- Parent department: Home Office
- Key documents: Misuse of Drugs Act 1971; Psychoactive Substances Act 2016
- Website: Advisory Council on the Misuse of Drugs

Map
- Territory of the United Kingdom

The Advisory Council on the Misuse of Drugs (ACMD) is a British statutory advisory non-departmental public body, which was established under the Misuse of Drugs Act 1971.

== Mandate ==
Its terms of reference, according to the Act, are as follows:

to keep under review the situation in the United Kingdom with respect to drugs which are being or appear to them likely to be misused and of which the misuse is having or appears to them capable of having harmful effects sufficient to constitute a social problem, and to give to any one or more of the Ministers, where either Council consider it expedient to do so or they are consulted by the Minister or Ministers in question, advice on measures (whether or not involving alteration of the law) which in the opinion of the Council ought to be taken for preventing the misuse of such drugs or dealing with social problems connected with their misuse, and in particular on measures which in the opinion of the Council, ought to be taken

- a) for restricting the availability of such drugs or supervising the arrangements for their supply;
- b) for enabling persons affected by the misuse of such drugs to obtain proper advice, and for securing the provision of proper facilities and services for the treatment, rehabilitation and aftercare of such persons;
- c) for promoting co-operation between the various professional and community services which in the opinion of the Council have a part to play in dealing with social problems connected with the misuse of drugs;
- d) for educating the public (and in particular the young) in the dangers of misusing such drugs and for giving publicity to those dangers;
- e) for promoting research into, or otherwise obtaining information about, any matter which in the opinion of the Council is of relevance for the purpose of preventing the misuse of such drugs or dealing with any social problem connected with their misuse.

== Functioning ==
One of the key functions of the ACMD is to recommend classification of new or existing drugs, which may be misused.

The sources of evidence that the ACMD uses are

- formal surveys undertaken for, or on behalf of, government including the British Crime Survey, the Forensic Science Service statistics, general population surveys, school surveys as well as international/European surveys such as European School Survey Project on Alcohol and other drugs;
- the law enforcement agencies;
- voluntary sector organisations with concerns and responsibilities for those who misuse drugs;
- professional bodies;
- published and unpublished scientific literature;
- submissions from special interest groups and the general public.

In order to have a rough but quantitative measure of the harms of a drug, the ACMD uses a risk assessment matrix, where nine different aspects of harm for each drug are evaluated:

- Physical harm
  - Acute
  - Chronic
  - Parenteral (i.e. intravenous harm)
- Dependence
  - Intensity of pleasure
  - Psychological dependence
  - Physical dependence
- Social harms
  - Intoxication
  - Other social harms
  - Healthcare costs

== Criticism ==
In 2006, the Science and Technology Select Committee of the UK House of Commons conducted a series of case studies examining the government's handling of scientific advice, risk and evidence in policy making. The second of its case-studies focused on the relationship between scientific advice and evidence and the classification of illegal drugs. It examined the workings of the ACMD.

A summary of the findings, vis-a-vis ACMD:

In the course of this case study, we have looked in detail at the role played by, and workings of, the Government's scientific advisory committee on drug classification and policy, the Advisory Council on the Misuse of Drugs (ACMD). We have identified a number of serious flaws in the way the Council conducts its business. Although the Council has produced useful reports explaining the rationale behind its recommendations on drug classification decisions, we found a lack of transparency in other areas of its work and a disconcerting degree of confusion over its remit. We also note that the ACMD has failed to adhere to key elements of the Government's Code of Practice for Scientific Advisory Committees. In response to these and other concerns about the Council's operations, we have called for the Home Office to ensure that there is, in future, independent oversight of the Council's workings. We have also highlighted the need for the ACMD to play a far more a (sic) proactive role in supporting the work of the Department of Health and Department for Education and Skills: the Government's approach to drug education and treatment must be informed by scientific advice and stronger cross-departmental coordination will be vital if the Public Service Agreement targets on drugs policy are to be met.

Some specific findings:

69. Overall, our examination of the processes used by the ACMD and Home Office to make, respectively, recommendations and decisions regarding the classification of drugs has revealed a disconcertingly ad hoc approach to determining when reviews should be undertaken and a worrying lack of transparency in how classification decisions are made.

73. .. It is extremely disappointing that the Council has not taken any steps to increase the transparency of its operations and, moreover, that the Chairman displayed so little interest in improving the Council's approach in evidence to us. It is incumbent upon the Chairman to ensure that the ACMD follows the spirit of openness prescribed by the Code of Practice.

85. .. If, as the ACMD Chairman indicated to us, the Council's work has been seriously hindered by the lack of evidence, the ACMD should have been far more vocal in pressing Ministers to ensure that more research was commissioned to fill the key gaps in the evidence base.

97. .. We understand that the ACMD operates within the framework set by the Misuse of Drugs Act 1971 but, bearing in mind that the Council is the sole scientific advisory body on drugs policy, we consider the Council's failure to alert the Home Secretary to the serious doubts about the basis and effectiveness of the classification system at an earlier stage a dereliction of its duty.

== Findings ==
On the advice of the ACMD, Home Secretary David Blunkett downgraded cannabis from Class B to Class C in 2004. However, Home Secretary Jacqui Smith returned it to Class B in 2009, against the council's recommendation, and also declined to follow its recommendation to downgrade ecstasy from Class A to class B.

In March 2010, the ACMD published a report, Consideration of the cathinones, which recommended that mephedrone and other cathinones should be made illegal. On the same day it released a report titled Pathways to problems, detailing progress made on recommendations made in 2006. The report stated that not enough was being done about alcohol and tobacco usage and that the Misuse of Drugs Act should be reviewed. Because it was published on the same day as the report on cathinones, it received no media coverage, nor a response from the Home Office.

== Members ==
The ACMD is required to have at least 20 members. All members are unpaid, although expenses are reimbursed.

=== January 2011 appointments ===
In January 2011, the government appointed nine new members to the Advisory Council, including a new chair. The new chairman, Les Iversen, is a retired Oxford University professor of pharmacology and neuropharmacology specialist. The appointment of Dr Hans-Christian Raabe, a prominent member of the Maranatha Community, which aims to "re-establish Christian values in society" received coverage in the British press. Raabe, a General Practitioner from Manchester, had previously stood as a Christian Peoples Alliance candidate for the North West of England in the European Parliament elections of 2009. As a candidate for the CPA, Raabe had made a number of controversial statements concerning homosexuality, one being; "there is a disproportionately greater number of homosexuals among paedophiles and an overlap between the gay movement and the movement to make paedophilia acceptable". Dr Raabe once argued that "it is futile to pursue discredited policies of so-called 'harm-reduction'", and had written that "The only way of stopping people from dying from drug-related deaths is to prevent drug use in the first place". On the 8th of February 2011, Dr Raabe was sacked before his first meeting.

=== Controversial resignations ===
Professor David Nutt of the University of Bristol was Chairman of the ACMD until being relieved of his post on 30 October 2009 after criticising politicians for "distorting" and "devaluing" research evidence in the debate over illicit drugs. David Nutt founded the Independent Scientific Committee on Drugs on 15 January 2010. The goal of his new committee is to complement and eventually supersede the ACMD by providing independent advice that is untainted by government interference.

In February 2009, the government was accused by Professor Nutt of making a political decision with regard to drug classification in rejecting the scientific advice to downgrade ecstasy from a class A drug. The ACMD report on ecstasy, based on a 12-month study of 4,000 academic papers, concluded that it is not as dangerous as other class A drugs such as heroin and cocaine, and should be downgraded to class B. The advice was not followed. Jacqui Smith, then Home Secretary, was also widely criticised by the scientific community for bullying Professor David Nutt into apologising for his comments that, in the course of a normal year, more people die from falling off horses than from taking ecstasy. Professor Nutt was sacked by Jacqui Smith's successor as Home Secretary Alan Johnson; Johnson saying "It is important that the government's messages on drugs are clear and as an advisor you do nothing to undermine public understanding of them. I cannot have public confusion between scientific advice and policy and have therefore lost confidence in your ability to advise me as Chair of the ACMD."

In his October 2009 paper (based on a lecture given in July 2009) Nutt had repeated his familiar view that illicit drugs should be classified according to the actual evidence of the harm they cause and pointed out that alcohol and tobacco caused more harm than LSD, ecstasy and cannabis. Alcohol should come fifth behind cocaine, heroin, barbiturates and methadone, and tobacco should rank ninth, ahead of cannabis, LSD and ecstasy, he said. He also argued that smoking cannabis created only a "relatively small risk" of psychotic illness.

Explaining his sacking of Nutt, Alan Johnson wrote in a letter to The Guardian, that "He was asked to go because he cannot be both a government advisor and a campaigner against government policy. [...] As for his comments about horse riding being more dangerous than ecstasy, which you quote with such reverence, it is of course a political rather than a scientific point." Responding in The Times, Professor Nutt said:

I gave a lecture on the assessment of drug harms and how these relate to the legislation controlling drugs. According to Alan Johnson, the Home Secretary, some contents of this lecture meant I had crossed the line from science to policy and so he sacked me. I do not know which comments were beyond the line or, indeed, where the line was [...]

In the wake of Nutt's dismissal, Dr Les King, a part-time advisor to the Department of Health, and the senior chemist on the ACMD, resigned from the body. His resignation was soon followed by that of Marion Walker, Clinical Director of Berkshire Healthcare NHS Foundation Trust's substance misuse service, and the Royal Pharmaceutical Society's representative on the ACMD.

The Guardian revealed that Alan Johnson ordered what was described as a 'snap review' of the 40-strong ACMD in October 2009. This, it was said, would assess whether the body is "discharging the functions" that it was set up to deliver and decide if it still represented value for money for the public. The review was to be conducted by David Omand. Within hours of The Guardian revealing this, an article was published online by The Times arguing that Nutt's controversial lecture actually conformed to government guidelines throughout. The report of the review was published in February 2011.

On 10 November 2009 three further members of the Council resigned following a meeting with Alan Johnson. They were: Dr John Marsden, Dr Ian Ragan and Dr Simon Campbell. A sixth member, Dr Polly Taylor, resigned in March 2010, shortly before the decision to make substituted cathinones—including the legal high mephedrone—illegal. On 1 April 2010 Eric Carlin also resigned after the announcement of the ban, saying that the decision by the Home Secretary was "unduly based on media and political pressure". He also stated "We had little or no discussion about how our recommendation to classify this drug would be likely to impact on young people's behaviour. As well as being extremely unhappy with how the ACMD operates, I am not prepared to continue to be part of a body which, as its main activity, works to facilitate the potential criminalisation of increasing numbers of young people."

=== Potential reduction of scientists on the committee ===
The Police Reform and Social Responsibility Act 2011 removed the legal requirement which meant the ACMD had to have scientists and experts on the panel.

Following the Act, the panel no longer has to have: someone who practices veterinary medicine; someone who practices medicine, other than veterinary medicine; someone who practices dentistry; someone who practices pharmacy; someone from the pharmaceutical industry; or a chemist, other than from the pharmaceutical chemistry.

== Public opinion ==
Previous Home Secretaries, when responding to the advice of the Advisory Council on the Misuse of Drugs, have all reiterated that the majority of public opinion is against reforming the current stance on prohibition. However, a poll commissioned by the Liberal Democrats found that when the definitions of three regulatory options were given to members of the public instead of simply asking "Do you think drugs should be legalised?" the majority in fact supported new regulatory control.

== See also ==
- Wootton Report
- Arguments for and against drug prohibition
- Drug liberalisation
- Drug policy reform
- Drugs controlled by the UK Misuse of Drugs Act
