= 4-Methylcathinone =

Stimulant designer drug

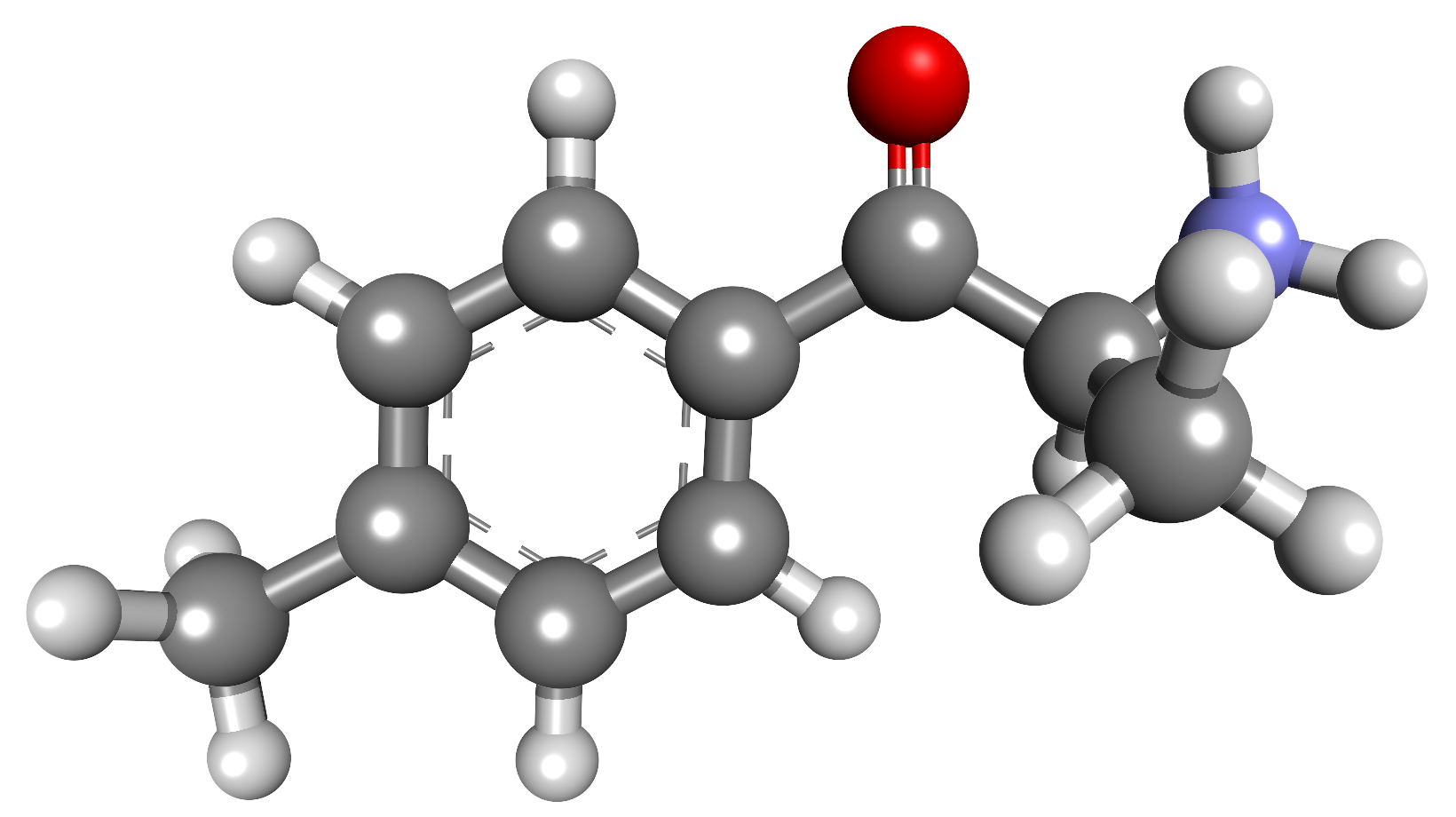

Clinical data
- Other names: 4-MC; Normephedrone; NSC-60487

Legal status
- Legal status: DE: NpSG (Industrial and scientific use only); UK: Class B

Identifiers
- IUPAC name: 2-amino-1-(4-methylphenyl)propan-1-one
- CAS Number: 31952-47-3; HCl: 6941-17-9
- PubChem CID: 414532
- ChemSpider: 367058
- UNII: CY9HK59OK6
- CompTox Dashboard (EPA): DTXSID801032529

Chemical and physical data
- Formula: C_{10}H_{13}NO
- Molar mass: 163.220 g·mol^{−1}
- 3D model (JSmol): Interactive image
- SMILES: CC1=CC=C(C=C1)C(=O)C(C)N
- InChI: InChI=1S/C10H13NO/c1-7-3-5-9(6-4-7)10(12)8(2)11/h3-6,8H,11H2,1-2H3; Key:OHULHWHSUJEYIT-UHFFFAOYSA-N

4-Methylcathinone (4-MC), also known as normephedrone, is a stimulant drug of the cathinone group. It is an active metabolite of the better known drug mephedrone (4-methylmethcathinone or 4-MMC).

4-MC is a serotonin–norepinephrine–dopamine releasing agent (SNDRA) similarly to mephedrone. It displays a 2.4-fold selectivity to promote monoamine release via DAT over SERT as opposed to 309-fold selectivity for cathinone. It also releases norepinephrine.

Monoamine release of 4-methylcathinone and related agents (EC_{50}, nM)
Compound	NE	DA	5-HT	Ref
Dextroamphetamine	6.6–7.2	5.8–24.8	698–1,765	
Dextromethamphetamine	12.3–13.8	8.5–24.5	736–1,292	
4-Methylamphetamine	22.2	44.1	53.4	
4-Methylmethamphetamine	66.9	41.3	67.4	
MDMA	54.1–110	51.2–278	49.6–72	
Cathinone	23.6–25.6	34.8–83.1	6,100–7,595	
Methcathinone	22–26.1	12.5–49.9	2,592–5,853	
Normephedrone	100	220	210	
R(+)-Normephedrone	89	150	179	
S(–)-Normephedrone	115	391	1,592	
Mephedrone	58–62.7	49.1–51	118.3–122	
S(–)-Mephedrone	ND	74	61	
R(+)-Mephedrone	ND	31	1,470	
Methylone	140–270	117–220	234–708	
Notes: The smaller the value, the more strongly the drug releases the neurotransmitter. The assays were done in rat brain synaptosomes and human potencies may be different. See also Monoamine releasing agent § Activity profiles for a larger table with more compounds. Refs:

== See also ==
- 4-Methylbuphedrone
- 4-Methylethcathinone
