= Journal of Psychopharmacology =

- Discipline: Psychopharmacology
- Language: English
- Edited by: David Nutt, Pierre Biler

Publication details
- History: 1987–present
- Publisher: SAGE Publications on behalf of the British Association for Psychopharmacology
- Frequency: Monthly
- Open access: Hybrid
- Impact factor: 4.738 (2018)

Standard abbreviations
- ISO 4: J. Psychopharmacol. (Oxf.)
- NLM: J Psychopharmacol

Indexing
- CODEN: JOPSEQ
- ISSN: 0269-8811 (print); 1461-7285 (web)
- OCLC no.: 19962867

Links
- Journal homepage; Online access; Online archive

The Journal of Psychopharmacology is a monthly peer-reviewed scientific journal published by SAGE Publications on behalf of the British Association for Psychopharmacology. It was established in 1987 and is a member of the Committee on Publication Ethics. The editors-in-chief are David Nutt (Imperial College London) and Pierre Blier (University of Ottawa). The journal covers all aspects of psychopharmacology.

== Abstracting and indexing ==
Journal of Psychopharmacology is abstracted and indexed in, among other databases: EMBASE/Excerpta Medica, MEDLINE, SCOPUS, and the Social Sciences Citation Index. According to the Journal Citation Reports, the journal had a 2018 impact factor of 4.738, ranking it 30 out of 197 journals in the category "Clinical Neurology", 53 out of 261 journals in the category "Neurosciences", 22 out of 261 journals in the category "Pharmacology & Pharmacy", and 21 out of 142 journals in the category "Psychiatry".
