= Drug Science =

British drugs advisory committee

DrugScience
- Formation: 15 January 2010; 16 years ago
- Acting Chief Executive Officer: Anne Katrin Schlag
- Key people: Barry Everitt, David Nutt
- Website: www.drugscience.org.uk
- Formerly called: Independent Scientific Committee on Drugs (ISCD)

Drug Science or DrugScience, originally called the Independent Scientific Committee on Drugs (ISCD), is a UK-based drugs advisory committee proposed and initially funded by hedge fund manager Toby Jackson. It is chaired by Professor David Nutt and was officially launched on 15 January 2010 with the help of the Centre for Crime and Justice Studies. The primary aim of the committee is to review and investigate the scientific evidence of drug harms without the political interference that could result from government affiliation.

The establishment of the committee followed the controversial sacking of Professor Nutt, on 30 October 2009 as chair of the UK's statutory Advisory Council on the Misuse of Drugs by UK Home Secretary, Alan Johnson after the Equasy controversy. The controversy followed his Eve Saville Memorial Lecture (2009) at the Centre.

Drug Science initially focused on reviewing official risk estimates for psychedelic drugs, ecstasy and cannabis, and increasing warnings of the dangers of ketamine. In 2013, Drug Science launched the peer-review academic journal Drug Science, Policy and Law published by SAGE. They currently have three working groups Medical Cannabis, Medical Psychedelics, and Enhanced Harm Reduction.

== Drug harm comparison ==
In 2010, Drug Science published a ranking of drug harms in the UK, the results of which garnered significant media attention. Drugs were assessed on two metrics – harm to users and harms to society. The report found heroin, crack cocaine, and methamphetamine to be the most harmful drugs to individuals, with alcohol, heroin, and crack cocaine as the most harmful to others. Overall, alcohol was the most harmful drug, with heroin and crack cocaine in second and third place. Most notably, the report stated that the legal status of most drugs bears little relation to the harms associated with them – several class A drugs including ecstasy (MDMA), LSD and magic mushrooms featured at the very bottom of the list. Similar findings were found by a Europe-wide study conducted by 40 drug experts in 2015. Since then, drug ranking by total harm research has come to the same conclusion.

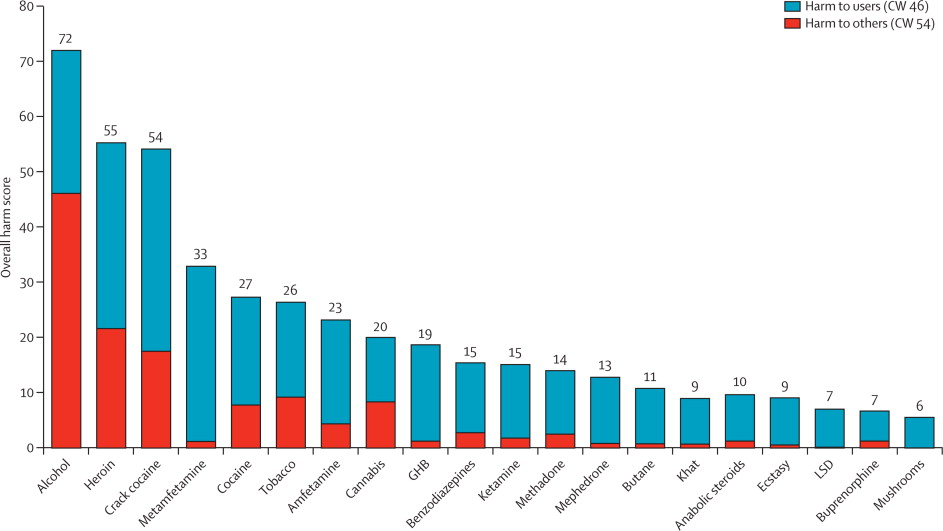
A ranking of common recreational drugs in the UK – assessed by harm to user and harm to society. Alcohol, heroin and crack cocaine are the three most harmful drugs

Methods used in drug harm comparison

The results of the study were based on the opinions and judgment of 15 researchers, doctors, and a journalist. These opinions were exchanged and discussed during a 1-day workshop in accordance with a decision-making procedure called Multiple-Criteria-Decision-Analysis (MCDA). This procedure attempts to structure the debate so as to eliminate biases, but given that it has no input other than the experience and knowledge of the participants involved, it is unlikely to be unbiased if the participants share a similar understanding of a subject, or if the science in the field is inadequate to make a good judgment.

== Further drug harm analyses ==
Drug Science has expanded its MCDA method to a number of contexts to measure the harms of various drugs and drug policies.

Using a similar multi-criteria decision analysis process as the 2010 drug harm ranking, Drug Science looked to rank the harms of all nicotine-containing products, including cigarettes, cigars, nicotine patches and e-cigarettes. The report concluded that e-cigarettes are 95% less harmful than conventional cigarettes, advice which was subsequently used in a report by Public Health England on e-cigarettes and now forms part of the evidence-base for the positions of the UK Government and the National Health Service. This figure was widely reported on in the press, but remains controversial as the long-term harms of e-cigarettes remain unknown.

Drug Science also undertook 2 MCDAs in 2015. The first was completed through a grant received by the EU Department of Justice and sought to rank the comparative harms of 20 drugs in the EU. The published report ranked alcohol and tobacco as the most harmful and in need of policy reforms, while drugs like cannabis and ecstasy ranked last. The second MCDA was a comparison of policy responses to non-medical opioid usage. The final report, published in 2021, ranked state control of opioid supply as the most effective means of reducing harm, with absolute prohibition ranking as the least effective.

Drug Science additionally contributes to international MCDAs for drug policy. In 2018, they supported a Norwegian drug policy MCDA, which ranked policy responses to cannabis and alcohol. The final report concluded that state control of cannabis and alcohol supply is the most effective to reduce the harms of both drugs. In the same year, Drug Science provided support for an Australian MCDA on comparative drug harms, which ranked the harms of 22 drugs and largely mirrored the results of the original 2010 UK harm ranking.

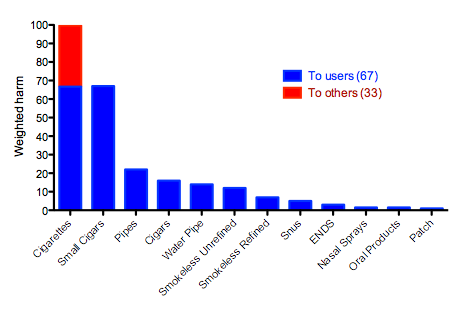
A multi-criteria decision analysis ranking of nicotine-containing product harm. Cigarettes and cigars are the most harmful by a considerable degree, with e-cigarettes some 95% less harmful than cigarettes.

== Drugs Live ==
Drugs Live: The Ecstasy Trial is a two-part TV documentary aired on Channel 4 on 26 and 27 September 2012. The program showed an fMRI study on the effects of MDMA (ecstasy) on the brain, which was funded by Channel 4. The main researchers on the study were Drug Science's Val Curran and David Nutt who also appeared as guests on the show. Curran and Nutt oversaw research at Imperial College London, in which volunteers took part in a double blind study, taking either 83 mg of MDMA or a placebo before going into the fMRI scanner.

The documentary was presented by Christian Jessen and Jon Snow, and included debate on the harms of MDMA, as well as exhibiting the findings of the study. Some participants in the study also appeared on the show, including a vicar, an ex-soldier, writer Lionel Shriver, actor Keith Allen and former Liberal Democrat MP Evan Harris.

Following the success of The Ecstasy Trial, a second documentary aired on Channel 4, Drugs Live: The Cannabis Trial, on 3 March 2015. Snow, along with fellow journalists Matthew Parris and Jennie Bond, took part in "a groundbreaking trial," consuming cannabis in both skunk and hash form and having their brains imaged with an fMRI. Throughout the program, Nutt and Drug Science Scientific Committee member, Professor Val Curran, gave expert commentary and interpreted the fMRI results. This experiment, funded by Channel 4, Drug Science, and the Beckley Foundation was a part of a larger trial at University College London (UCL), examining the effects of cannabis on the brain.

== Medical cannabis working group and Project T21 ==
In 2019, Drug Science launched the Medical Cannabis Working Group to provide guidance in the emerging medical cannabis sector. The same year, they established Project T21 (originally Project Twenty21), Europe's largest medical cannabis patient data registry, aiming to create the UK's largest body of evidence for the effectiveness and tolerability of medical cannabis. T21 allowed eligible patients to access affordable medical cannabis treatment, with their progress monitored to gather real-world evidence supporting NHS funding for such therapies. By 2021, Drug Science published its first T21 paper, making findings accessible to the public, and the registry surpassed 1,000 registered patients, a significant milestone for medical cannabis research. In 2022, T21 expanded to Australia in collaboration with the Australian College of Cannabinoid Medicine.

After its 5th year, Project T21 ceased operation in 2024.

Drug Science has additionally been involved with several cannabis studies, like collaborating with MedCan Support in 2023 to study cannabis use for rare childhood epilepsies. Additionally, Drug Science has studied and published results regarding the usage of CBD-based medicines in controlling symptoms of Long COVID. This study has demonstrated that these medicines are safe and well-tolerated.

== Psychedelic research working group ==
In 2020, Drug Science launched the Medical Psychedelics Working Group to promote a rational approach to psychedelic research and explore their therapeutic potential. Professor Joanna Neill of the University of Manchester is the current Chair of this group. This initiative aims to develop evidence-based policies and clinical practices for the use of psychedelics in medical settings. In 2024, Drug Science partnered with University College London to study MDMA-assisted psychotherapy, focusing on its therapeutic potential. This collaboration seeks to address concerns that the 'psychotherapy' aspect of MDMA-assisted psychotherapy—which expert opinion considers crucial to long-term success involving MDMA as a psychotherapeutic agent—is not yet well understood and may be suboptimal. Selected peer-reviewed publications from this group include

== Enhanced harm reduction working group ==
Drug Science established the Enhanced Harm Reduction Working Group (EHRWG) as a consortium of scientific experts, academics, policy makers, treatment providers, and advocacy groups working collaboratively to reduce the harms of drug use. Professor Alex Stevens of the University of Sheffield serves as Chair with Dr Gillian Shorter of Queen's University Belfast as Vice Chair. The group's aim is to develop the evidence base for enhanced harm reduction services in the UK including overdose prevention centres/supervised consumption sites/drug consumption rooms, drug checking, and high-tolerance housing and to inform the legal reforms needed to enable such services to operate.

The EHRWG advocates for a participatory, rights-based approach in the design and delivery of harm reduction services, emphasising co-production with people who use drugs to ensure services are community-friendly, non-judgemental, and effective at reducing stigma. The group has published a three-part report on the case for overdose prevention centres in the UK, comprising quantitative needs assessment, qualitative community research conducted with peer researchers, and the largest evidence review of international evidence on drug consumption rooms, overdose prevention centres, and safe consumption sites. They have also produced educational resources on emergency medical treatment, diamorphine assisted treatment, and supervised injection facilities.

== Awards and policy achievements ==
- 2014: Professor Nutt wins the John Maddox Prize for Standing Up for Science, and his book Drugs: Without The Hot Air wins the Transmission Prize for Communication of Ideas.
- 2015: Drug Science's analysis of nicotine harms influences Public Health England to promote vaping as a safer alternative to smoking.
- 2016: A Drug Science report prompts the World Health Organization to review cannabis for the first time since 1935.
- 2017: Professor Nutt testifies in the Pretoria High Court, influencing South Africa's decision to decriminalise cannabis.
- 2021: The Project T21 registry surpasses 1,000 registered patients, marking a milestone in medical cannabis research.

== Drug Science publications ==
- Rogeberg, Ole; Bergsvik, Daniel; Phillips, Lawrence D.; Amsterdam, Jan van; Eastwood, Niamh; Henderson, Graeme; Lynskey, Micheal; Measham, Fiona; Ponton, Rhys (2018). "A new approach to formulating and appraising drug policy: A multi-criterion decision analysis applied to alcohol and cannabis regulation". International Journal of Drug Policy. 56: 144–152. doi:10.1016/j.drugpo.2018.01.019. hdl:10044/1/58452. PMID 29459211.
- Singh, Ilina; Morgan, Celia; Curran, Valerie; Nutt, David; Schlag, Anne; McShane, Rupert (May 2017). "Ketamine treatment for depression: opportunities for clinical innovation and ethical foresight". The Lancet Psychiatry. 4 (5): 419–426. doi:10.1016/s2215-0366(17)30102-5. hdl:10871/30208. PMID 28395988. S2CID 28186580.
- Taylor, Polly; Nutt, David; Curran, Val; Fortson, Rudi; Henderson, Graeme (26 March 2016). "Ketamine—the real perspective". The Lancet. 387 (10025): 1271–1272. doi:10.1016/s0140-6736(16)00681-4. PMID 26975791.
- Nutt, David J.; Phillips, Lawrence D.; Balfour, David; Curran, H. Valerie; Dockrell, Martin; Foulds, Jonathan; Fagerstrom, Karl; Letlape, Kgosi; Milton, Anders (2014). "Estimating the Harms of Nicotine-Containing Products Using the MCDA Approach". European Addiction Research. 20 (5): 218–225. doi:10.1159/000360220. hdl:10044/1/32179. ISSN 1022-6877. PMID 24714502.
- Ragan, C. I.; Bard, I.; Sing, I; Independent Scientific Committee on Drugs (ISCD) (2013). "What should we do about student use of cognitive enhancers? An analysis of current evidence". Neuropharmacology. 64: 588–595. doi:10.1016/j.neuropharm.2012.06.016. PMID 22732441. S2CID 207227699.
- Celia J. A. Morgan; H. Valerie Curran; Independent Scientific Committee on Drugs (ISCD) (2011). "Ketamine use: a review". Addiction. 107 (1): 27–38. doi:10.1111/j.1360-0443.2011.03576.x. PMID 21777321. S2CID 11064759.
- Nutt, D. J.; King, L. A.; Phillips, L. D. (2011). "Drugs and harm to society- Authors' reply". The Lancet. 377 (9765): 555. doi:10.1016/S0140-6736(11)60199-2. S2CID 54282142.
- Nutt, D. J.; King, L. A.; Phillips, L. D.; Independent Scientific Committee on Drugs (ISCD) (2010). "Drug harms in the UK: a multicriteria decision analysis". The Lancet. 376 (9752): 1558–1565. Bibcode:2010Lanc..376.1558N. CiteSeerX 10.1.1.690.1283. doi:10.1016/S0140-6736(10)61462-6. PMID 21036393. S2CID 5667719.
