= Tolyl group =

Class of functional groups derived from toluene

Structures of the three isomers of tolyl group

In organic chemistry, tolyl groups are functional groups related to toluene. They have the general formula CH_{3}C_{6}H_{4}−R. The change of the relative position of the methyl and the R substituent on the aromatic ring can generate three possible structural isomers: 1,2 (ortho), 1,3 (meta), and 1,4 (para). Tolyl groups are aryl groups which are commonly found in the structure of diverse chemical compounds. They are considered nonpolar and hydrophobic groups.

The functionalization to include tolyl groups into compounds is often done by Williamson etherification, using tolyl alcohols as reagents, or by C-C coupling reactions. Tolyl sulfonates are excellent leaving groups in nucleophilic substitutions, for this reason, they are commonly generated as intermediaries to activate alcohols. To this end, 4-toluenesulfonyl chloride is reacted in the presence of a base with the corresponding alcohol.
