= 4-Methylpentedrone =

Stimulant medications/drugs of the cathinone class

Legal status
- Legal status: DE: NpSG (Industrial and scientific use only); UK: Class B

Identifiers
- IUPAC name: 1-(4-Methylphenyl)-2-methylamino-pentan-1-one
- CAS Number: 1373918-61-6
- ChemSpider: 58951581
- UNII: G83HJ935NV
- CompTox Dashboard (EPA): DTXSID301032536

Chemical and physical data
- Formula: C_{13}H_{19}NO
- Molar mass: 205.301 g·mol^{−1}
- 3D model (JSmol): Interactive image
- SMILES: CCCC(NC)C(=O)c1ccc(C)cc1
- InChI: InChI=1S/C13H19NO/c1-4-5-12(14-3)13(15)11-8-6-10(2)7-9-11/h6-9,12,14H,4-5H2,1-3H3; Key:AKVKBEDACKJNPO-UHFFFAOYSA-N

4-Methylpentedrone (also known as 4-MPD and 4-Methyl-α-methylamino-valerophenone), is a stimulant medication of the cathinone class, invented in 1960.

It is a higher homolog of 4-methylmethcathinone (mephedrone) and 4-methylbuphedrone (4-MeMABP), and the p-methyl derivative of pentedrone. It can also be viewed as the methylamino analog of pyrovalerone.

A related compound, 4-methyl-α-ethylaminopentiophenone (4-MEAP), has been found to be incorrectly sold as 4-methylpentedrone.

== See also ==
- Buphedrone
- Substituted cathinone
