= 4-Methyl-α-ethylaminopentiophenone =

Chemical compound

Clinical data
- Other names: 4‑MEAP; 4‑MEAPP; N-Ethyl-4'-methylnorpentedrone; 2-(Ethylamino)-1-(4-methylphenyl)-1-pentanone; 4-Methyl-alpha-ethylaminopentiophenone; 4‑methyl‑NEP

Legal status
- Legal status: BR: Class F2 (Prohibited psychotropics); CA: Schedule I; DE: NpSG (Industrial and scientific use only); UK: Class B; US: Schedule I

Identifiers
- IUPAC name: 2-(Ethylamino)-1-(4-methylphenyl)-1-pentanone
- CAS Number: 746540-82-9 18297-05-7 (HCl)
- PubChem CID: 205601
- ChemSpider: 178132
- UNII: R2APU4QOW0
- CompTox Dashboard (EPA): DTXSID601024542

Chemical and physical data
- Formula: C_{14}H_{21}NO
- Molar mass: 219.328 g·mol^{−1}
- 3D model (JSmol): Interactive image
- SMILES: CC1=CC=C(C(C(CCC)NCC)=O)C=C1
- InChI: InChI=1S/C14H21NO/c1-4-6-13(15-5-2)14(16)12-9-7-11(3)8-10-12/h7-10,13,15H,4-6H2,1-3H3; Key:IKIANZXWCBSIGA-UHFFFAOYSA-N

4-Methyl-α-ethylaminopentiophenone (4-MEAP) is a designer drug of the cathinone class. It is a higher homolog of 4-methylpentedrone (4-MPD) with an ethyl group in place of the methyl group. 4-MEAP has been found in samples of drugs sold as 4-MPD.

In the United States, 4-MEAP is a Schedule I Controlled Substance.

== See also ==
- N-Ethylpentedrone
- Pentedrone
