= 2-Aminoindane =

Chemical compound

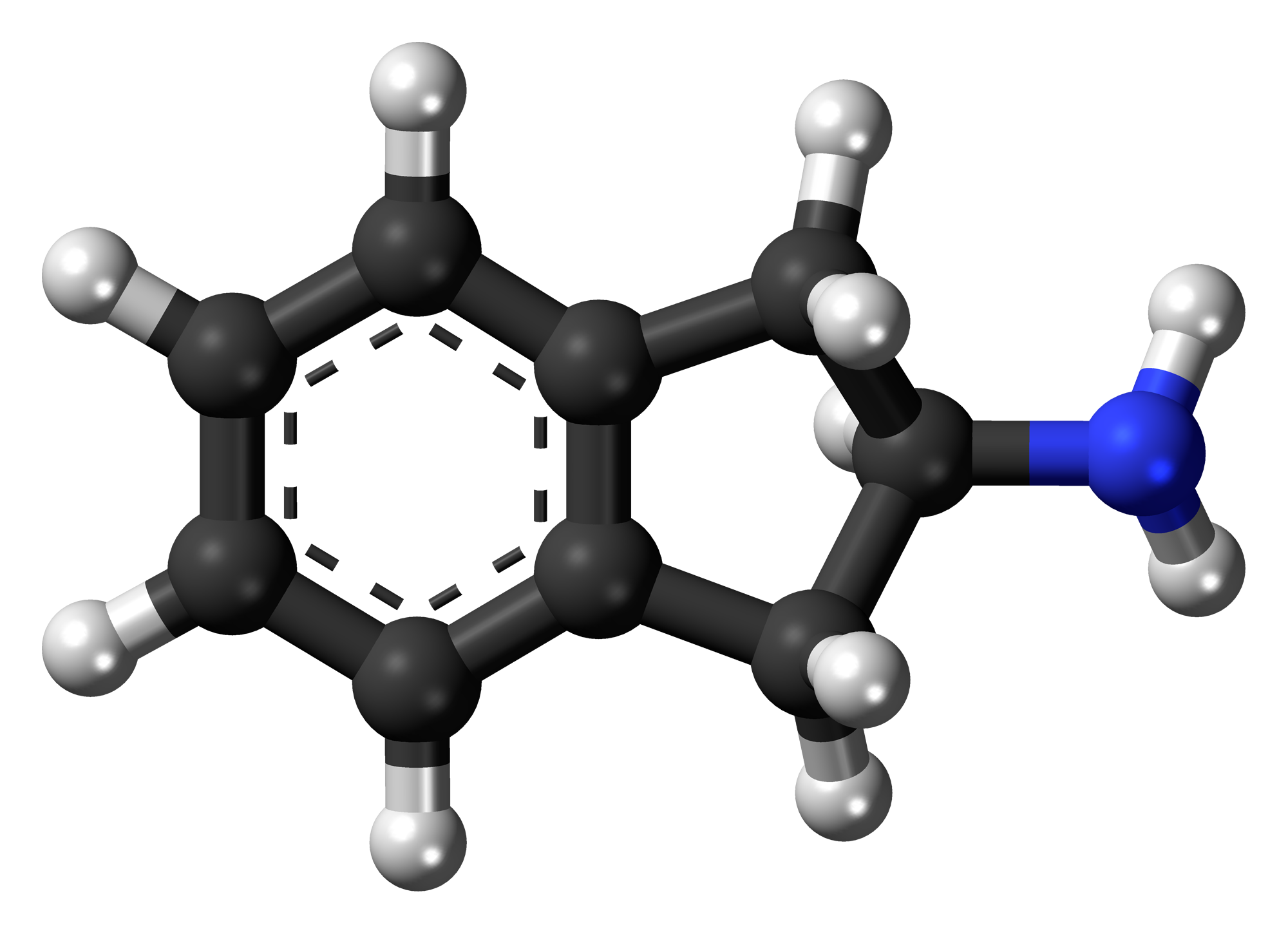

Clinical data
- Other names: 2-Indanylamine; 2-Indanamine, SU-8629.
- Routes of administration: Oral
- Drug class: Norepinephrine–dopamine releasing agent; Stimulant
- ATC code: None

Legal status
- Legal status: DE: NpSG (Industrial and scientific use only); UK: Under Psychoactive Substances Act; In general: uncontrolled

Identifiers
- IUPAC name: 2,3-Dihydro-1H-inden-2-amine
- CAS Number: 2975-41-9
- PubChem CID: 76310
- ChemSpider: 68787
- UNII: 1P810SQ3EY
- CompTox Dashboard (EPA): DTXSID40183902
- ECHA InfoCard: 100.019.111

Chemical and physical data
- Formula: C_{9}H_{11}N
- Molar mass: 133.194 g·mol^{−1}
- 3D model (JSmol): Interactive image
- SMILES: C1C(CC2=CC=CC=C21)N
- InChI: InChI=1S/C9H11N/c10-9-5-7-3-1-2-4-8(7)6-9/h1-4,9H,5-6,10H2; Key:LMHHFZAXSANGGM-UHFFFAOYSA-N

2-Aminoindane (2-AI) is a stimulant of the 2-aminoindane family, as well as a cyclic analogue of amphetamine. It acts as a monoamine releasing agent at NET and DAT, but shows minimal activity at SERT. It has also been shown to have activity at multiple α_{2}-adrenergic receptors. It has been sold as a designer drug.

== Pharmacology ==
=== Pharmacodynamics ===
2-AI is a monoamine releasing agent acting as a selective substrate for NET and DAT. It also shows affinity for multiple α_{2}-adrenergic receptors, including α_{2}_{A} (K_{i} = 134 nM), α_{2}_{B} (K_{i} = 211 nM), and α_{2}_{C} (K_{i} = 41 nM). It partially substitutes for amphetamine in rodent drug discrimination tests.

Activities of 2-aminoindanes and amphetamine relatives
Compound	Monoamine release (EC_{50}, nM)			Ref
Compound	Serotonin	Norepinephrine	Dopamine	Ref
2-AI	>10,000	86	439	
MDAI	114	117	1,334	
MMAI	31	3,101	>10,000	
MEAI	134	861	2,646	
d-Amphetamine	698–1,765	6.6–7.2	5.8–24.8	
MDA	160–162	47–108	106–190	
MDMA	50–85	54–110	51–278	
3-MA	ND	58.0	103	
Notes: The smaller the value, the more strongly the compound produces the effect. The assays were done in rat brain synaptosomes and human potencies may be different. See also Monoamine releasing agent § Activity profiles for a larger table with more compounds. Refs:

== Chemistry ==
=== Synthesis ===
The chemical synthesis of 2-aminoindane was reported. For example, a 79% yield was reported from indene and ammonia precursors. The older method uses 1-indanone as the starting material.

=== Analogues ===
2-AI is a rigid analogue of amphetamine and has similar effects in rodents. Other related homologues and rigid analogues of amphetamine include 2-aminotetralin (2-AT), 2-amino-1,2-dihydronapthalene (2-ADN), 1-naphthylaminopropane (1-NAP), 2-naphthylaminopropane (2-NAP), 1-phenylpiperazine (1-PP), 6-AB, and 7-AB.

=== Derivatives ===
A number of derivatives of 2-aminoindane, also known as substituted 2-aminoindanes, are known, including 5-IAI, aprindine, BFAI, BFMAI, DHAI, DOM-AI ETAI, indantadol, MDAI, MEAI (5-MeO-2-AI), MDMAI, MMAI, NM-2-AI, PNU-99,194, Pyr-AI, and TAI, among others. Rexaceract (c.f. GT-02287) contains the 2-AI pharmacophore.

== Society and culture ==
=== Legal status ===
==== China ====
As of October 2015 2-AI is a controlled substance in China.

==== Finland ====
Scheduled in the "Government decree on psychoactive substances banned from the consumer market".

==== Sweden ====
Sweden's public health agency suggested classifying 2-AI as a hazardous substance, on June 24, 2019.

==== United States ====
2-Aminoindane is not scheduled at the federal level in the United States, but may be considered an analog of amphetamine, in which case purchase, sale, or possession could be prosecuted under the Federal Analog Act.

== See also ==
- Substituted 2-aminoindane
- Cyclized phenethylamine
- 1-Aminoindane
- 1-Aminomethylindane
- 2-Aminotetralin
