= List of entactogens =

This is a list of entactogens, or drugs that produce feelings of social connection and empathy.

== Phenethylamines ==
=== Amphetamines ===
- 3-Chloromethamphetamine (3-CMA)
- 3-Methoxymethamphetamine (MMMA)
- 4-Fluoroamphetamine (4-FA)
- para-Methoxyamphetamine (PMA)
- 4-Methylthioamphetamine (4-MTA)

==== Methylenedioxyamphetamines (benzodioxoles) ====
- d2-MDMA
- MMDA (5-methoxy-MDA)
- 5-Methyl-MDA
- Methylbenzodioxolylbutanamine (MBDB)
- Methylenedioxyamphetamine (MDA)
- Methylenedioxyethylamphetamine (MDEA)
- Methylenedioxymethamphetamine (MDMA)
  - (S)-MDMA and (R)-MDMA (EMP-01, DT402/MM402)
  - Non-racemic MDMA (ALA-002; AM-1002)
- Methylenedioxyhydroxyamphetamine (MDOH)
- Methylenedioxyhydroxymethylamphetamine (MDMOH, FLEA)
- Lys-MDA

==== Benzofurans ====
- 6-(2-Aminopropyl)benzofuran (6-APB)
- 5-(2-Aminopropyl)benzofuran (5-APB)
- 5-(2-Methylaminopropyl)benzofuran (5-MAPB)

==== Others ====
- 5-APDI (indanylaminopropane; IAP)
- Methamnetamine (PAL-1046)
- ODMA
- SDA (3T-MDA)
- SDMA (3T-MDMA)
- SeDMA
- TDMA

==== Cathinones ====
- Butylone (βk-MBDB)
- Flephedrone (4-FMC)
- Mephedrone (4-MMC)
- 3-Methylmethcathinone (3-MMC, metaphedrone)
- Methylone (MDMC; βk-MDMA)
- TH-PVP

=== Psychedelic phenethylamines ===
- 2C-B

== Cyclized phenethylamines ==
=== 2-Aminoindanes ===
- 5-Iodo-2-aminoindane (5-IAI)
- 5,6-Methylenedioxy-2-aminoindane (MDAI)
- 5,6-Methylenedioxy-N-methyl-2-aminoindane (MDMAI)
- 5-Methoxy-6-methyl-2-aminoindane (MMAI)
- 5-Methoxy-2-aminoindane (MEAI, 5-MeO-AI)

=== 2-Aminotetralins ===
- 6,7-Methylenedioxy-2-aminotetralin (MDAT)

=== Aminorexes ===
- 4,4'-Dimethylaminorex (4,4'-DMAR)
- Methylenedioxy-4-methylaminorex (MDMAR)

== Tryptamines ==
=== 5-Methoxytryptamines ===
- 5-MeO-DiPT
- 5-MeO-MiPT

=== α-Alkyltryptamines ===
- α-Ethyltryptamine (αET)
- α-Methyltryptamine (αMT)

==== β-Keto-α-alkyltryptamines ====
- BK-NM-AMT
- BK-5F-NM-AMT

== Tryptamine bioisosteres ==
=== Isotryptamines ===
- α-Methylisotryptamine (isoAMT; PAL-569)

=== Indolizines ===
- 1Z2MAP1O

== See also ==
- Serotonin releasing agent
- Substituted methylenedioxyphenethylamine
- List of investigational hallucinogens and entactogens
- List of psychedelic drugs
- List of hallucinogens
