= Indene =

Bicyclic hydrocarbon compound with formula C9H8

- Skeletal formula

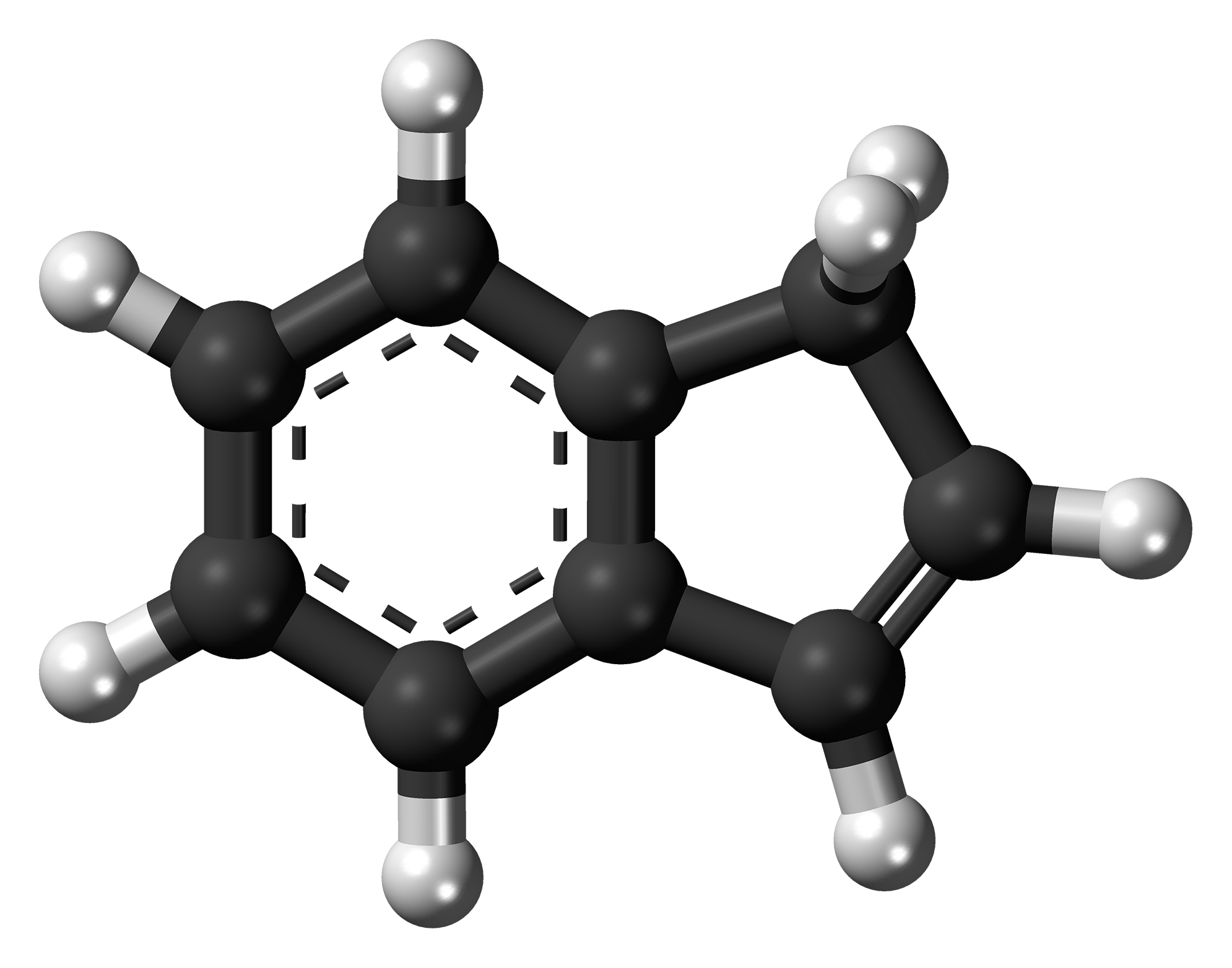

Names
- Preferred IUPAC name 1H-Indene
- Other names Benzocyclopentadiene; Indonaphthene; Bicyclo[4.3.0]nona-1,3,5,7-tetraene

Identifiers
CAS Number	95-13-6
3D model (JSmol)	Interactive image
Beilstein Reference	635873
ChEBI	CHEBI:41921
ChEMBL	ChEMBL192812
ChemSpider	6949
DrugBank	DB02815
ECHA InfoCard	100.002.176
EC Number	202-393-6
Gmelin Reference	27265
KEGG	C11565
PubChem CID	7219
UNII	67H8Y6LB8A
CompTox Dashboard (EPA)	DTXSID8042052
- InChI: InChI=1S/C9H8/c1-2-5-9-7-3-6-8(9)4-1/h1-6H,7H2 Key: YBYIRNPNPLQARY-UHFFFAOYSA-N; InChI=1/C9H8/c1-2-5-9-7-3-6-8(9)4-1/h1-6H,7H2 Key: YBYIRNPNPLQARY-UHFFFAOYAJ
- SMILES: c1ccc2c(c1)CC=C2

Properties
Chemical formula	C_{9}H_{8}
Molar mass	116.16
Appearance	Colorless liquid
Density	0.997 g/mL
Melting point	−1.8 °C (28.8 °F; 271.3 K)
Boiling point	181.6 °C (358.9 °F; 454.8 K)
Solubility in water	Insoluble
Acidity (pK_{a})	20.1 (in DMSO)
Magnetic susceptibility (χ)	−80.89×10^{−6} cm^{3}/mol

Hazards
- Occupational safety and health (OHS/OSH)
Main hazards	Flammable
Flash point	78.3 °C (172.9 °F; 351.4 K)
- NIOSH (US health exposure limits)
PEL (Permissible)	none
REL (Recommended)	TWA 10 ppm (45 mg/m^{3})
IDLH (Immediate danger)	N.D.

Related compounds
Related compounds	Benzofuran, Benzothiophene, Indole
- Except where otherwise noted, data are given for materials in their standard state (at 25 °C [77 °F], 100 kPa). verify (what is ?) Infobox references

Indene is an aromatic, polycyclic hydrocarbon with chemical formula C_{9}H_{8}. It is composed of a benzene ring fused with a cyclopentene ring. This flammable liquid is colorless although samples often are pale yellow. The principal industrial use of indene is in the production of indene/coumarone thermoplastic resins. Substituted indenes and their closely related indane derivatives are important structural motifs found in many natural products and biologically active molecules, such as sulindac.

== Isolation ==
Indene occurs naturally in coal-tar fractions boiling around 175–185 °C. It can be obtained by heating this fraction with sodium to precipitate solid "sodio-indene". This step exploits indene's weak acidity evidenced by its deprotonation by sodium to give the indenyl derivative. The sodio-indene is converted back to indene by steam distillation.

== Reactivity ==
Indene readily polymerises. Oxidation of indene with acid dichromate yields homophthalic acid (o-carboxylphenylacetic acid). It condenses with diethyl oxalate in the presence of sodium ethoxide to form indene–oxalic ester, and with aldehydes or ketones in the presence of alkali to form benzofulvenes, which are highly coloured. Treatment of indene with organolithium reagents gives lithium indenyl compounds:

C_{9}H_{8} + RLi → LiC_{9}H_{7} + RH

Indenyl is a ligand in organometallic chemistry, giving rise to many transition metal indenyl complexes.

At temperatures ranging from 30-75 Kelvin (the temperature range of most dark molecular clouds and photodissociation regions), Indene undergoes a process called superhydrogenation. It begins with saturation of carbon atoms in the pentagonal ring which is then followed by the hydrogenation of the benzene unit. Quantum tunneling also plays a role is this.

== Applications ==
- Indene can also be used directly to synthesize 2-Aminoindan & NM-2-AI.

2-Indanone [615-13-4]

- Indene is used as a starting material to make 2-indanone [615-13-4]. 2-indanone in-turn is used to synthesize the following drugs: Aprindine, Delapril, Indanorex, Indantadol, Pip-AI [23928-93-0], Pyr-AI, S-15535 & BChE-IN-7 [2416910-85-3], 2-aminoindane analog of fentanyl: O=C(CC)N(C1=CC=CC=C1)C2CCN(C3CC(C=CC=C4)=C4C3)CC2.

Additionally, there is a fragrance called Magnolan [27606-09-3], made from indene.

== See also ==
- Indane
- Indole
- Isoindene
- Indenyl effect
- Indenone
