= Substituted 2-aminoindane =

Class of chemical compounds

Chemical structure of 2-aminoindane (2-AI), the parent compound of the substituted 2-aminoindanes.

Chemical structure of MDAI, one of the most well-known 2-aminoindanes.

A substituted 2-aminoindane is a derivative of 2-aminoindane (2-AI) with one or more chemical substituents. They are cyclized phenethylamines and are structurally related to amphetamines like amphetamine and MDMA.

Many 2-aminoindanes are known to act as monoamine releasing agents and/or receptor modulators. They include psychoactive drugs, more specifically entactogens, stimulants, and psychedelics, and have been encountered as novel designer drugs. However, 2-aminoindanes are more selective for serotonin and/or norepinephrine release and are less effective at inducing dopamine release than their phenethylamine counterparts, are consequently less euphoric, and have not gained widespread popularity as recreational drugs. There is interest in entactogenic 2-aminoindanes for potential medical use, such as treatment of psychiatric disorders. One 2-aminoindane, MEAI, has been suggested as a possible alcohol alternative and substitute with better safety and less addictive potential.

Examples of 2-aminoindanes acting as monoamine releasing agents include 2-AI itself, NM-2-AI, MDAI, MMAI, MEAI (5-MeO-2-AI), and 5-IAI, among others. DOM-AI is the 2-aminoindane analogue of the DOx psychedelic DOM and shows psychedelic-like effects in animals similarly but less potently. 2-Aminoindanes acting via other actions include aprindine, indantadol, and PNU-99,194, among others.

== Use and effects ==
2-Aminoindanes acting as monoamine releasing agents variably produce entactogenic and/or stimulant effects. Serotonin-releasing 2-aminoindanes are described as less stimulating and much less euphoric than their phenethylamine counterparts. The next-day emotional hangover present with MDMA seems to be absent with these 2-aminoindanes, at least based on anecdotal user reports.

Oral doses and durations of 2-aminoindanes
Compound	Chemical name	Dose	Duration
2-AI	2-Aminoindane	10–20 mg (3–40 mg+)	Unknown
NM-2-AI	N-Methyl-2-aminoindane	125 mg (20–300 mg+)	Unknown
MDAI	5,6-Methylenedioxy-2-aminoindane	100–200 mg (20–300 mg+)	2–5 hours
MDMAI	5,6-Methylenedioxy-N-methyl-2-aminoindane	Unknown	Unknown
MEAI (5-MeO-AI)	5-Methoxy-2-aminoindane	100–250 mg	Unknown
MMAI	5-Methoxy-6-methyl-2-aminoindane	Unknown	Unknown
5-IAI	5-Iodo-2-aminoindane	100–200 mg (20–200 mg)	2–4 hours
Refs:

== Pharmacology ==
=== Pharmacodynamics ===
Activities of 2-aminoindanes and their amphetamine relatives
Compound	Monoamine release (EC_{50}, nM)			Ref
Compound	5-HT	NE	DA	Ref
2-AI	>10,000	86	439	
MDAI	114	117	1,334	
MDMAI	ND	ND	ND	ND
MEAI	134	861	2,646	
MMAI	31	3,101	>10,000	
d-Amphetamine	698–1,765	6.6–7.2	5.8–24.8	
MDA	160–162	47–108	106–190	
MDMA	50–85	54–110	51–278	
3-MA	ND	58.0	103	
MMA	ND	ND	ND	ND
Notes: The smaller the value, the more strongly the compound produces the effect. The assays were done in rat brain synaptosomes and human potencies may be different. See also Monoamine releasing agent § Activity profiles for a larger table with more compounds. Refs:

2-Aminoindanes are known to act as monoamine releasing agents, including of serotonin, norepinephrine, and/or dopamine, among other actions such as α_{2}-adrenergic receptor interactions. However, they are more selective for induction of serotonin and/or norepinephrine release than induction of dopamine release. This is thought to result in serotonin-releasing 2-aminoindanes having retained entactogenic effects but greatly reduced stimulating and euphoriant effects compared to their amphetamine counterparts.

Serotonin-releasing 2-aminoindanes show much less or no serotonergic neurotoxicity relative to MDMA. However, combination of serotonin-releasing 2-aminoindanes like MDAI or MMAI with amphetamine results in serotonergic neurotoxicity similar to that with MDMA. It is thought that robust simultaneous release of both serotonin and dopamine may be required for serotonergic neurotoxicity with MDMA-like drugs and that this is able to occur when serotonin-releasing aminoindanes are combined with an efficacious dopamine releaser like amphetamine.

== History ==
The serotonin-releasing 2-aminoindanes like MDAI were developed by David E. Nichols and colleagues at Purdue University and were first described in 1990 followed by further publications throughout the rest of the 1990s.

== List of substituted 2-aminoindanes ==
=== Monoamine releasing agents ===
- 2-Aminoindane (2-AI)
- 5,6-Benzofuranyl-2-aminoindane (BFAI)
- 5,6-Benzofuranyl-N-methyl-2-aminoindane (BFMAI)
- 5,6-Dihydroxy-2-aminoindane (DHAI)
- N-Ethyl-5-trifluoromethyl-2-aminoindane (ETAI)
- 1-(2-Indanyl)pyrrolidine (Pyr-AI, 2-PYI)
- 5-Iodo-2-aminoindane (5-IAI)
- 5-Iodo-N-methyl-2-aminoindane (5-IMAI)
- 5-Methoxy-2-aminoindane (MEAI, 5-MeO-2-AI)
- 5-Methoxy-6-methyl-2-aminoindane (MMAI)
- 5,6-Methylenedioxy-2-aminoindane (MDAI)
- 5,6-Methylenedioxy-N-methyl-2-aminoindane (MDMAI)
- N-Methyl-2-aminoindane (NM-2-AI)
- 5-Trifluoromethyl-2-aminoindane (TAI)

=== Other agents ===
- Aprindine (N-(diethylaminopropyl)-N-phenyl-2-aminoindane) – lidocaine-like antiarrhythmic agent
- DOM-AI (4,7-dimethoxy-5-methyl-2-aminoindane) – serotonergic psychedelic
- Indacaterol – β_{2}-adrenergic receptor agonist
- Indantadol (N-glycinamidyl-2-aminoindane; CHF-3381) – anticonvulsant, neuroprotective agent, monoamine oxidase inhibitor, and NMDA receptor antagonist
- Moxaprindine (1-methoxyaprindine) [53076-26-9] – lidocaine-like antiarrhythmic agent
- PNU-99,194 (5,6-dimethoxy-N,N-dipropyl-2-aminoindane) – dopamine D_{3} receptor antagonist
- RD-211 (4-hydroxy-5-methyl-N,N-dipropyl-2-aminoindane) [103836-88-0] – dopamine D_{2} and serotonin 5-HT_{1A} receptor agonist
- RDS-127 (4,7-dimethoxy-N,N-dipropyl-2-aminoindane) – dopamine D_{2} receptor agonist, other actions

== Related compounds ==
Indanorex is a 2-aminomethylindane, wherein the amino side chain has a methyl spacer. It was previously marketed under the brand name Dietor as a stimulant and appetite suppressant.

2-Aminotetralin (2-AT) and derivatives such as 6,7-methylenedioxy-2-aminotetralin (MDAT) and MDMAT are analogues of the 2-aminoindanes.

Jimscaline, 2CB-Ind, and AMMI are derivatives of 1-aminomethylindane, an indane- and amine-containing compound related to 1-aminoindane.

A number of notable derivatives of 1-aminoindane, a positional isomer of 2-AI, exist, such as rasagiline and ladostigil, among others.

== See also ==
- Cyclized phenethylamine
- Substituted methylenedioxyphenethylamine (MDxx)
- Substituted benzofuran
- Substituted α-alkyltryptamine
- Borax combo
