= MDAI =

Chemical compound

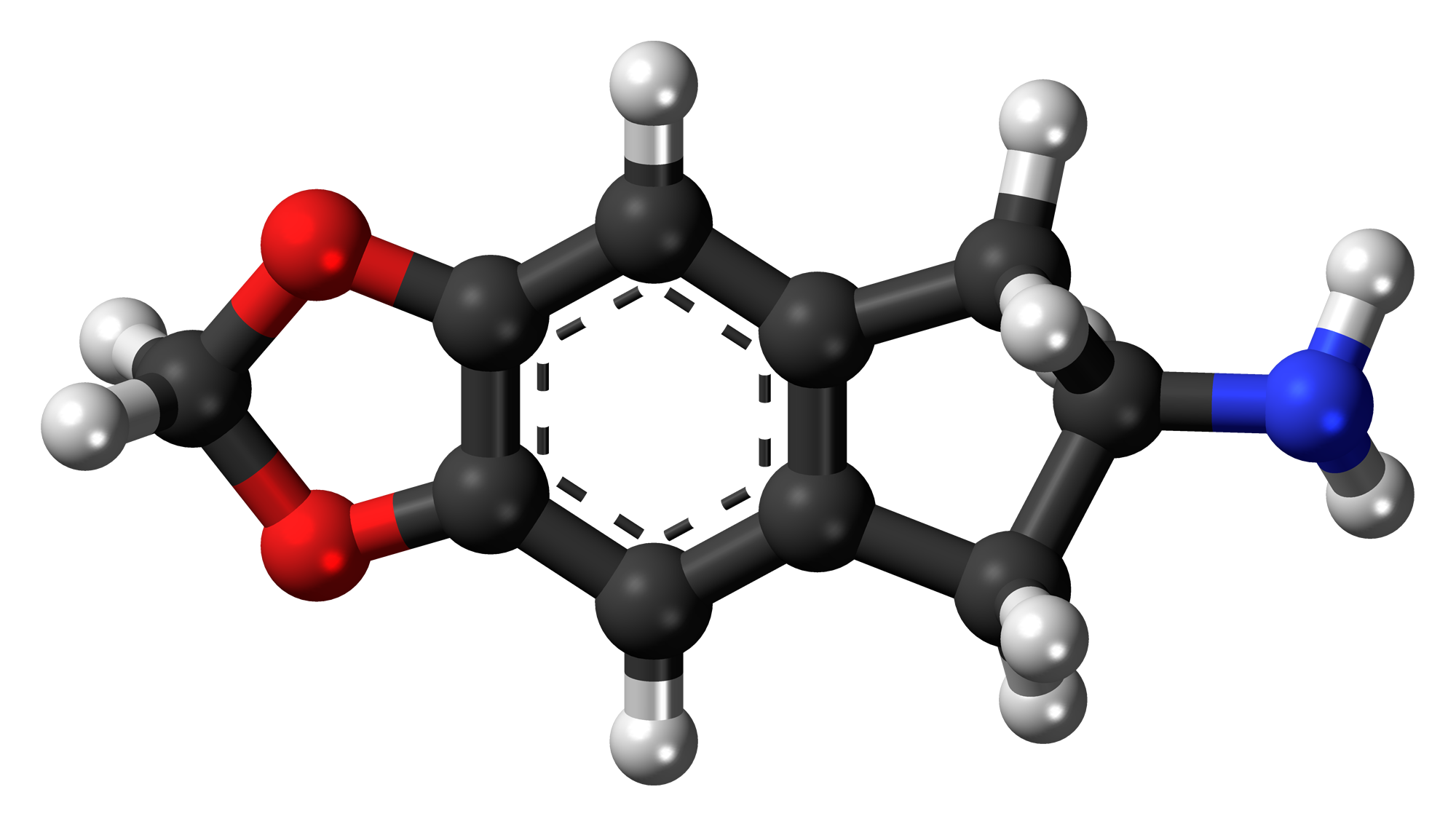

Clinical data
- Other names: 5,6-Methylenedioxy-2-aminoindane; 5,6-Methylenedioxy-2-aminoindan; Methylenedioxyaminoindane; Methylenedioxyaminoindan
- Routes of administration: Oral
- Drug class: Serotonin–norepinephrine releasing agent; Entactogen
- ATC code: None

Legal status
- Legal status: BR: Class F2 (Prohibited psychotropics); DE: NpSG (Industrial and scientific use only); UK: Under Psychoactive Substances Act; Illegal in China

Pharmacokinetic data
- Duration of action: 2–6 hours

Identifiers
- IUPAC name: 6,7-Dihydro-5H-cyclopenta[f][1,3]benzodioxol-6-amine
- CAS Number: 132741-81-2
- PubChem CID: 125558
- ChemSpider: 111694
- UNII: 0DMJ6G3XBF
- ChEBI: CHEBI:189818
- ChEMBL: ChEMBL162375
- CompTox Dashboard (EPA): DTXSID60157741

Chemical and physical data
- Formula: C_{10}H_{11}NO_{2}
- Molar mass: 177.203 g·mol^{−1}
- 3D model (JSmol): Interactive image
- SMILES: C1C(CC2=CC3=C(C=C21)OCO3)N
- InChI: InChI=1S/C10H11NO2/c11-8-1-6-3-9-10(13-5-12-9)4-7(6)2-8/h3-4,8H,1-2,5,11H2; Key:FQDRMHHCWZAXJM-UHFFFAOYSA-N

MDAI, also known as 5,6-methylenedioxy-2-aminoindane, is an entactogen of the 2-aminoindane family, as well as a cyclic analogue of MDA. It acts as a selective serotonin and norepinephrine releasing agent (SNRA). The drug shows greatly reduced serotonergic neurotoxicity in comparison to MDMA in animals, although it still shows capacity for neurotoxicity with chronic use or in combination with amphetamine.

MDAI was developed in the 1990s by a team led by David E. Nichols at Purdue University. It has been encountered as a designer drug and has been used recreationally with reported street names such as "sparkle" and "mindy". In addition to its recreational use, there has been interest in MDAI for potential use in medicine, for instance in drug-assisted psychotherapy.

== Use and effects ==
A 2024 study comparing the effects of MDAI and MDMA found that the subjective effects were qualitatively very similar in humans. This included stimulation, happiness, emotional openness, and mild perceptual alterations, without changes to general activity or concentration. At the employed dose of 3.0 mg/kg, with 125 mg MDMA corresponding to 1.9 mg/kg, it was estimated that MDAI had about 60% of MDMA's potency in producing comparable psychoactive effects (hence, roughly 200 mg MDAI would be similar to 125 mg MDMA). Aside from subjective effects, MDAI also increased blood pressure, cortisol levels, and prolactin levels similarly to MDMA. Conversely, it did not increase heart rate or body temperature.

In addition to its use by itself, MDAI is used as a component of the more closely MDMA-mimicking Borax combo along with a stimulant and a low dose of a psychedelic.

== Toxicity ==
Very high doses can be fatal in rats, with a 50% fatality rate for those subcutaneously injected with 28 mg/kg of MDAI. This is a result of the way serotonin release interferes with thermoregulation.

While MDAI is typically non-neurotoxic in isolation, it may become neurotoxic when mixed with other drugs or used chronically. Three deaths were linked to MDAI use in the United Kingdom during 2011 and 2012, all involving symptoms consistent with serotonin syndrome. Two of these also involved other drugs while one death appeared to be from MDAI alone.

== Pharmacology ==
=== Pharmacodynamics ===
MDAI acts as a selective and well-balanced serotonin and norepinephrine releasing agent (SNRA) with much less (~10-fold lower) effect on dopamine release. In addition to inducing the release of the monoamine neurotransmitters, MDAI also inhibits their reuptake. For comparison to MDAI, MDA and MDMA are well-balanced releasing agents of serotonin, norepinephrine, and dopamine (SNDRAs). Conversely, the profile of monoamine release with MDAI is very similar to that of (R)-MDMA (levo-MDMA), which like MDAI is also a well-balanced SNRA with about 10-fold reduced impact on dopamine release, though MDAI is several-fold more potent than (R)-MDMA in vitro.

In contrast to MDMA, MDAI shows no affinity for any of the serotonin receptors (K_{i} = all >10 μM). This notably includes the serotonin 5-HT_{2A} receptor, which is implicated in producing psychedelic effects, and the serotonin 5-HT_{2B} receptor, which is implicated in causing cardiac valvulopathy. However, MDAI shows significant affinity for all three of the α_{2}-adrenergic receptors (K_{i} = 322 to 1121 nM).

Activities of MDAI and related drugs
| Compound | Monoamine release (EC_{50}, nM) | | |
| Compound | Serotonin | Norepinephrine | Dopamine |
|---|---|---|---|
| 2-AI | >10,000 | 86 | 439 |
| MDAI | 114 | 117 | 1,334 |
| MMAI | 31 | 3,101 | >10,000 |
| MEAI | 134 | 861 | 2,646 |
| d-Amphetamine | 698–1,765 | 6.6–7.2 | 5.8–24.8 |
| d-Methamphetamine | 736–1,292 | 12.3–13.8 | 8.5–24.5 |
| MDA | 160 | 108 | 190 |
| MDMA | 49.6–72 | 54.1–110 | 51.2–278 |
| (R)-MDMA (l-MDMA) | 340 | 560 | 3,700 |
| MDEA | 47 | 2,608 | 622 |
| MBDB | 540 | 3,300 | >100,000 |
Notes: The smaller the value, the more strongly the compound produces the effect. See also Monoamine releasing agent § Activity profiles for a larger table with more compounds. Refs:

In drug discrimination assays in animals, entactogens such as MDMA produce multiple cues which animals can be trained to respond to: a stimulant cue typified by drugs such as methamphetamine, a psychedelic cue typified by drugs such as LSD, and an "entactogen-like" cue which is produced by drugs such as MDAI and MBDB. Accordingly, MDAI and MBDB cause drug-appropriate responses in animals trained to recognize the effects of MDMA, but do not produce responses in animals trained selectively to respond to stimulants or psychedelics. Because they release serotonin and norepinephrine but have little effect on dopamine, they produce empathogenic effects without stimulant discriminative effects.

MDAI shows substantially lower serotonergic neurotoxicity than MDMA in animals and has been described as a "non-neurotoxic" analogue of MDMA. However, MDAI still shows weak serotonergic neurotoxicity both alone and particularly in combination with amphetamine in animals. As such, MDAI does not appear to be a fully non-neurotoxic alternative to MDMA.

=== Pharmacokinetics ===
The duration of MDAI in humans appears to be similar to that of MDMA at 2 to 5 hours or up to around 6 hours.

== Chemistry ==
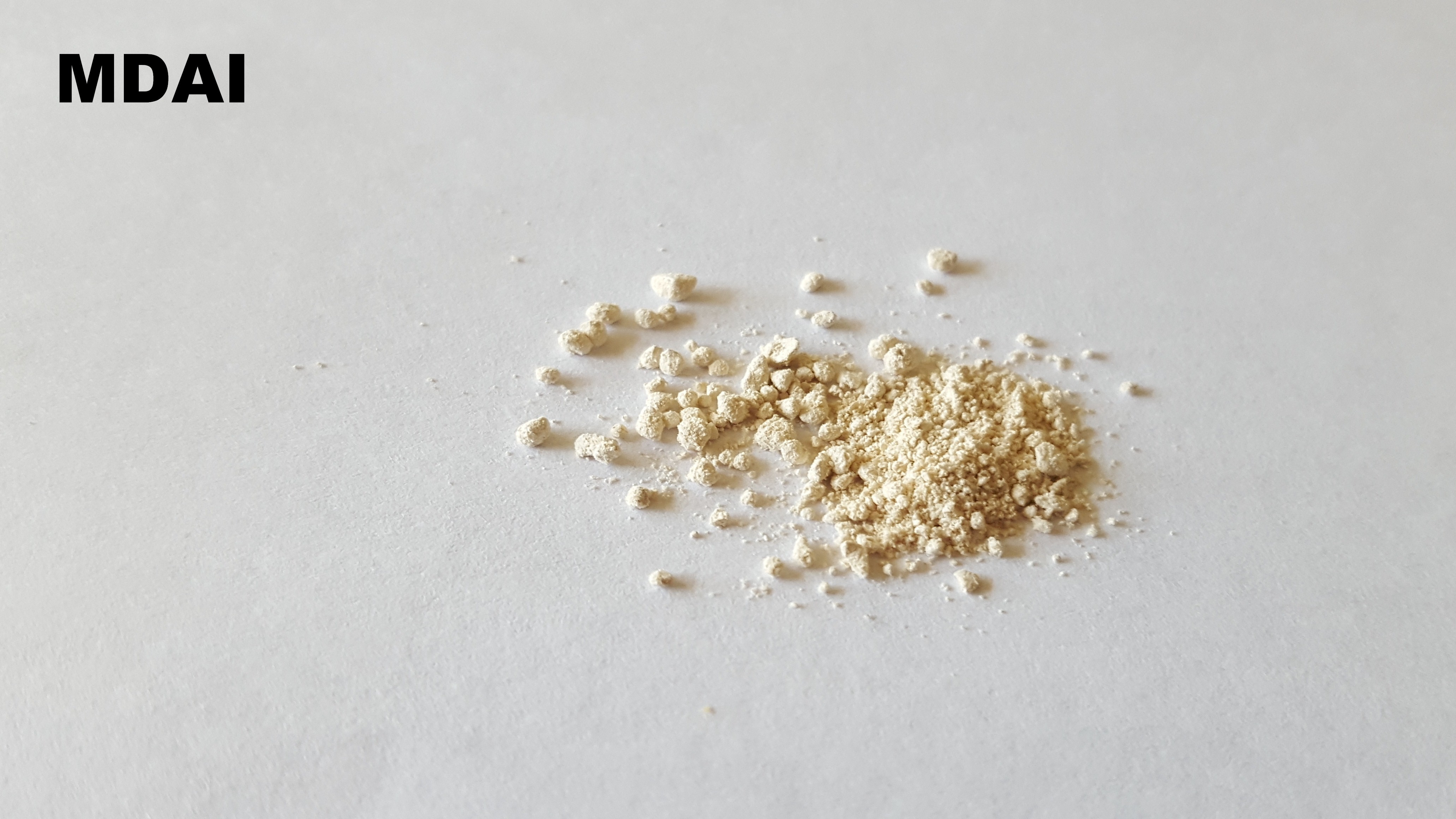
MDAI in powder form.

MDAI is a substituted 2-aminoindane. The chemical structure of MDAI is indirectly derived from that of the illicit drug MDA, but the α-methyl group of the alkylamino amphetamine side chain has been bound back to the benzene nucleus to form an indane ring system, which changes its pharmacological properties substantially.

=== Synthesis ===
MDAI can be produced from 3-(3,4-methylenedioxyphenyl)propionic acid which is converted to the acid chloride and then heated to produce 5,6-methylenedioxy-1-indanone. Treatment of the indanone with amyl nitrite in methanol with HCl afforded the hydroxyimino ketone. This is reduced to the 2-aminoindan following a modification of Nichols' earlier method from a paper discussing DOM analogues, using a Pd/C catalyst in glacial acetic acid with catalytic H_{2}SO_{4}.

=== Analogues ===
Analogues of MDAI include 2-aminoindane (2-AI), NM-2-AI, MDMAI, MEAI (5-MeO-2-AI), MMAI, and 5-IAI, among others.

== History ==
MDAI was first described in the scientific literature by David E. Nichols and colleagues at Purdue University in 1989.

== Society and culture ==
=== Recreational use ===
MDAI has been advertised as a designer drug. It started to be sold online from around 2007, but reached peak popularity between about 2010 to 2012, after bans on mephedrone came into effect in various countries. Many internet-sourced products claimed to be MDAI have been shown to contain mephedrone or other cathinones, while generally containing no MDAI. The number of internet searches for MDAI has been considerably higher in the United Kingdom compared to Germany and the United States.

=== Legal status ===
==== Canada ====
MDAI is not a controlled substance in Canada as of 2025.

==== China ====
As of October 2015 MDAI is a controlled substance in China.

==== Denmark ====
MDAI is illegal in Denmark as of September 2015.

==== Finland ====
Scheduled in the "government decree on psychoactive substances banned from the consumer market".

==== Switzerland ====
As of December 2011 MDAI is a controlled substance in Switzerland.

== Research ==
MDAI and other similar drugs have been widely used in scientific research, as they are able to replicate many of the effects of MDMA, but without causing the serotonergic neurotoxicity associated with MDMA and certain related drugs. No tests have been performed on cardiovascular toxicity.

== See also ==
- Substituted 2-aminoindane
- Substituted methylenedioxyphenethylamine
- Cyclized phenethylamine
