= DOM-AT =

Clinical data
- Other names: DOM/AT; DOMAT; 5,8-Dimethoxy-6-methyl-2-aminotetralin

Identifiers
- IUPAC name: 5,8-dimethoxy-6-methyl-1,2,3,4-tetrahydronaphthalen-2-amine
- CAS Number: 53609-01-1
- PubChem CID: 3016832
- ChemSpider: 2284695
- ChEMBL: ChEMBL159379
- CompTox Dashboard (EPA): DTXSID70968385

Chemical and physical data
- Formula: C_{13}H_{19}NO_{2}
- Molar mass: 221.300 g·mol^{−1}
- 3D model (JSmol): Interactive image
- SMILES: CC1=CC(=C2CC(CCC2=C1OC)N)OC
- InChI: InChI=1S/C13H19NO2/c1-8-6-12(15-2)11-7-9(14)4-5-10(11)13(8)16-3/h6,9H,4-5,7,14H2,1-3H3; Key:CEHNNXHZTWZRJP-UHFFFAOYSA-N

DOM-AT, or DOMAT, also known as 5,8-dimethoxy-6-methyl-2-aminotetralin, is a cyclized phenethylamine and 2-aminotetralin related to the psychedelic amphetamine DOM. It is specifically the cyclized 2-aminotetralin analogue of DOM.

The compound has been found to be a more potent agonist of peripheral serotonin receptors than DOM in vitro. This activity was blocked by the serotonin receptor antagonist cinanserin and by the non-hallucinogenic serotonin receptor modulator 2-bromo-LSD (BOL-148). However, DOM-AT was not tested for hallucinogen-type activity in animals or humans in these studies. Subsequently, DOM-AT did not appear to show a typical hallucinogen-like profile in behavioral tests in rats (e.g., the conditioned avoidance response test). In cats, DOM-AT produced a rage reaction, while in rabbits, it produced behavioral excitation and hyperthermia. In later research, DOM-AT failed to substitute for LSD in rodent drug discrimination tests, whereas the related cyclized 2-aminoindan compound DOM-AI was effective, albeit with far lower potency than DOM (approximately 1/15th). Based on these findings, DOM-AT has been deemed inactive in terms of hallucinogen-like activity and unlikely to be psychedelic in humans.

DOM-AT was first described in the scientific literature by David E. Nichols in 1973.

Other cyclized analogues of DOM and related psychedelics include DOM-CR, DMCPA, TFMBOX, jimscaline, TCB-2, LPH-5, and ZC-B.

== See also ==
- Substituted 2-aminotetralin
- CT-5126
- UH-232
