= PAL-335 =

Clinical data
- Other names: PAL335
- Drug class: Selective serotonin releasing agent (SSRA)
- ATC code: None

PAL-335 is a selective serotonin releasing agent (SSRA) which has been used in scientific research. It has been found to increase reward responsiveness (a prohedonic effect) in rodents similarly to the serotonin–norepinephrine–dopamine releasing agent and entactogen MDMA and the norepinephrine–dopamine releasing agent and stimulant 3-methylamphetamine (3-MA; PAL-314). The drug has also been found to impair task performance similarly to MDMA but unlike 3-MA. The interoceptive effects of PAL-335 in drug discrimination studies are being assessed. PAL-335 was first described in the scientific literature by Bruce E. Blough and colleagues in 2026. It is being used as a tool to help study the mechanisms underlying the rewarding effects and misuse liability of MDMA. The chemical structure of PAL-335 does not yet appear to have been disclosed.

== See also ==
- Serotonin releasing agent
- Borax combo
