= (R)-MDMA =

Psychoactive drug taken by mouth

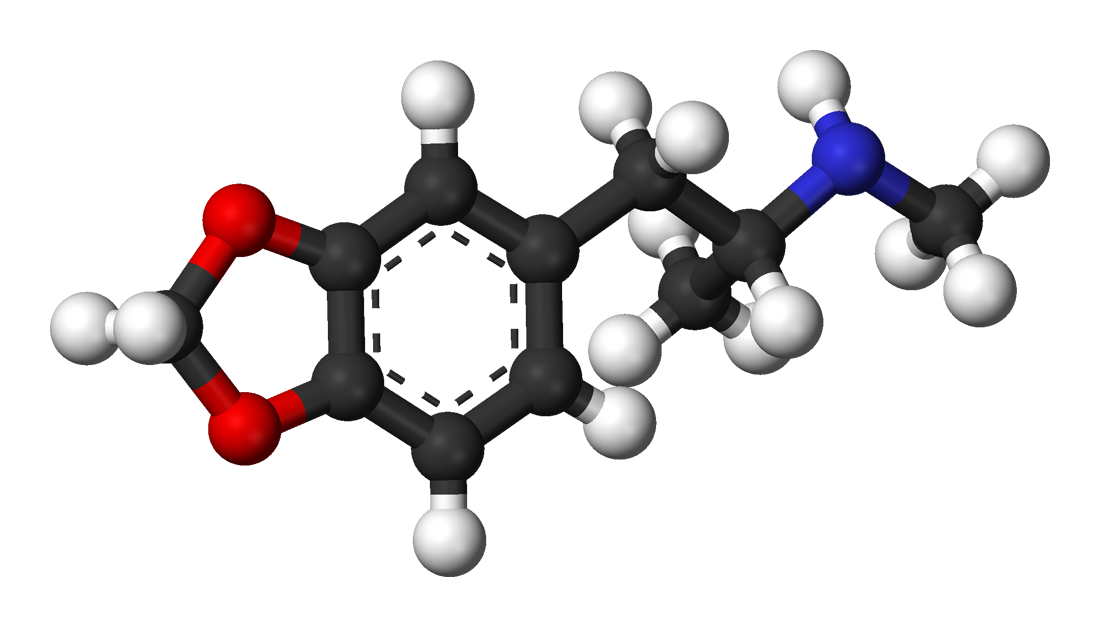

Clinical data
- Other names: (R)-Methylenedioxy-methamphetamine; (R)-MDMA; (R)-(−)-MDMA; R(−)-MDMA; (−)-MDMA; (R)-Midomafetamine; (R)-(−)-Midomafetamine; (−)-Midomafetamine; Armidomafetamine; levo-MDMA; l-MDMA; EMP-01; EMP01; DT-402; DT402; MM-402; MM402
- Routes of administration: Oral
- Drug class: Serotonin–norepinephrine releasing agent; Serotonin 5-HT_{2A} receptor agonist; Entactogen; Empathogen

Pharmacokinetic data
- Metabolism: CYP2D6
- Elimination half-life: 11–14 hours
- Duration of action: 3.5–5.2 hours

Identifiers
- IUPAC name: (2R)-1-(1,3-benzodioxol-5-yl)-N-methylpropan-2-amine
- CAS Number: 81262-70-6
- PubChem CID: 667458
- ChemSpider: 580842
- UNII: 3947754WXW
- ChEMBL: ChEMBL382757

Chemical and physical data
- Formula: C_{11}H_{15}NO_{2}
- Molar mass: 193.246 g·mol^{−1}
- 3D model (JSmol): Interactive image
- SMILES: C[C@H](CC1=CC2=C(C=C1)OCO2)NC
- InChI: InChI=1S/C11H15NO2/c1-8(12-2)5-9-3-4-10-11(6-9)14-7-13-10/h3-4,6,8,12H,5,7H2,1-2H3/t8-/m1/s1; Key:SHXWCVYOXRDMCX-MRVPVSSYSA-N

(R)-3,4-Methylenedioxy-N-methylamphetamine ([R]-MDMA), also known as (R)-midomafetamine or as levo-MDMA, is the (R)- or levorotatory (l-) enantiomer of 3,4-methylenedioxy-N-methylamphetamine (MDMA; midomafetamine; "ecstasy"), a racemic mixture of (R)-MDMA and (S)-MDMA. Like MDMA, (R)-MDMA is an entactogen or empathogen. It is taken by mouth.

The drug is a serotonin–norepinephrine releasing agent (SNRA) and weak serotonin 5-HT_{2A} receptor agonist. It has substantially less or no significant dopamine-releasing activity compared to MDMA and (S)-MDMA. In preclinial studies, (R)-MDMA shows equivalent therapeutic-like effects to MDMA, such as increased prosocial behavior, but shows reduced psychostimulant-like effects, addictive potential, and serotonergic neurotoxicity. In clinical studies, (R)-MDMA produces similar effects to MDMA and (S)-MDMA, but is less potent and has a longer duration.

(R)-MDMA was first described in enantiopure form by 1978. Under the developmental code names EMP-01, developed by AtaiBeckley, and DT402 (formerly MM402), developed by Definium Therapeutics (formerly MindMed), it is under development for the treatment of post-traumatic stress disorder (PTSD), social phobia, and pervasive development disorders (PDDs) such as autism. It is thought that (R)-MDMA might have a better safety profile than MDMA itself whilst retaining its therapeutic benefits.

== Use and effects ==
(R)-MDMA has a dose of 125 to 300 mg orally and a duration of 3.5 to 5.2 hours. It has been estimated that doses of 125 mg MDMA, 100 mg (S)-MDMA, and 300 mg (R)-MDMA are equivalent.

The first modern clinical study of the comparative effects of MDMA, (R)-MDMA, and (S)-MDMA was published in August 2024. It compared 125 mg MDMA, 125 mg (S)-MDMA, 125 and 250 mg (R)-MDMA, and placebo. (R)-MDMA increased any drug effect, good drug effect, drug liking, stimulation, drug high, alteration of vision, and alteration of sense of time ratings similarly to MDMA and (S)-MDMA. However, (S)-MDMA 125 mg was more potent in increasing subjective effects, including stimulation, drug high, happy, and open, among others, than (R)-MDMA 125 or 250 mg or MDMA 125 mg. Ratings of bad drug effect and fear were minimal with MDMA, (R)-MDMA, and (S)-MDMA. In contrast to expectations, (R)-MDMA did not produce more psychedelic-like effects than (S)-MDMA. Besides subjective effects, (R)-MDMA increased heart rate, blood pressure, and body temperature similarly to MDMA and (S)-MDMA, though it was less potent in producing these effects. Body temperature was notably increased to the same extent with (R)-MDMA 250 mg as with MDMA 125 mg and (S)-MDMA 125 mg.

The differences in effects between (R)-MDMA and (S)-MDMA may reflect the higher potency of (S)-MDMA rather than actual qualitative differences between the effects of (S)-MDMA and (R)-MDMA. It was estimated that equivalent effects would be expected with (S)-MDMA 100 mg, MDMA 125 mg, and (R)-MDMA 300 mg. The findings of the study were overall regarded as not supporting the hypothesis that (R)-MDMA would produce equivalent therapeutic effects as (S)-MDMA or MDMA whilst reducing safety concerns. However, more clinical studies were called for to assess the revised estimated equivalent doses of MDMA, (R)-MDMA, and (S)-MDMA.

== Pharmacology ==
=== Pharmacodynamics ===
Activities of MDMA, its enantiomers, and related compounds
Compound	Monoamine release (EC_{50}, nM)		
Compound	Serotonin	Norepinephrine	Dopamine
Amphetamine	ND	ND	ND
(S)-Amphetamine (d)	698–1,765	6.6–7.2	5.8–24.8
(R)-Amphetamine (l)	ND	9.5	27.7
Methamphetamine	ND	ND	ND
(S)-Methamphetamine (d)	736–1,292	12.3–13.8	8.5–24.5
(R)-Methamphetamine (l)	4,640	28.5	416
MDA	160	108	190
(S)-MDA (d)	100	50	98
(R)-MDA (l)	310	290	900
MDMA	49.6–72	54.1–110	51.2–278
(S)-MDMA (d)	74	136	142
(R)-MDMA (l)	340	560	3,700
MDEA	47	2,608	622
(S)-MDEA (d)	465	RI	RI
(R)-MDEA (l)	52	651	507
MBDB	540	3,300	>100,000
MDAI	114	117	1,334
Notes: The smaller the value, the more strongly the compound produces the effect. Refs:

MDMA is a well-balanced serotonin–norepinephrine–dopamine releasing agent (SNDRA). (R)-MDMA and (S)-MDMA are both SNDRAs similarly. However, (R)-MDMA is several-fold less potent than (S)-MDMA in vitro and is also less potent than (S)-MDMA in vivo in non-human primates. In addition, whereas MDMA and (S)-MDMA are well-balanced SNDRAs, (R)-MDMA is comparatively much less potent as a dopamine releasing agent (~11-fold less potent in releasing dopamine than serotonin), and could be thought of instead more as a serotonin–norepinephrine releasing agent (SNRA) than as an SNDRA. In non-human primates, (S)-MDMA demonstrated significant dopamine transporter (DAT) occupancy, whereas DAT occupancy with (R)-MDMA was undetectable. Similarly, MDMA and (S)-MDMA were found to increase dopamine levels in the striatum in rodents and non-human primates, whereas (R)-MDMA did not increase striatal dopamine levels. As such, (R)-MDMA may be less psychostimulant-like than MDMA or (S)-MDMA.

In addition to its actions as an SNDRA, MDMA has weak affinity for the serotonin 5-HT_{2A}, 5-HT_{2B}, and 5-HT_{2C} receptors, where it acts as an agonist. (R)-MDMA shows higher affinity for the serotonin 5-HT_{2A} receptor than (S)-MDMA or MDMA. In addition, (R)-MDMA is more potent as an agonist of the serotonin 5-HT_{2A} receptor, acting as a weak partial agonist of this receptor, whereas (S)-MDMA shows very little effect. Conversely however, (S)-MDMA is more potent as an agonist of the serotonin 5-HT_{2C} receptor. Based on these findings, it has been hypothesized that (R)-MDMA may be more psychedelic-like than (S)-MDMA. However, although (R)-MDMA partially substitutes for lysergic acid diethylamide (LSD) in animal drug discrimination tests, it did not produce the head-twitch response, a behavioral proxy of psychedelic effects, at any tested dose. In any case, findings in this area are conflicting. (R)-MDMA is inactive as an agonist of the human TAAR1, whereas (S)-MDMA shows very weak potency as an agonist of the receptor (EC_{50} = 74,000 nM).

MDMA is a well-known serotonergic neurotoxin and this has been demonstrated both in animals and in humans. There is evidence that the serotonergic neurotoxicity of MDMA may be driven primarily by (S)-MDMA rather than (R)-MDMA. (R)-MDMA shows substantially lower or potentially no neurotoxicity compared to (S)-MDMA in animal studies. This has been the case even when doses of (R)-MDMA were increased to account for its lower potency than (S)-MDMA. However, more research is needed to confirm this in other species, such as non-human primates. In contrast to (S)-MDMA, (R)-MDMA does not produce hyperthermia in rodents, and this may be involved in its reduced risk of neurotoxicity, as hyperthermia augments and is essential for the serotonergic neurotoxicity of MDMA. The reduced potency of (R)-MDMA as a dopamine releasing agent may also be involved in its reduced neurotoxic potential, as dopamine release is likewise essential for the neurotoxicity of MDMA. The hyperthermia of MDMA may in fact be mediated by dopamine release. As (R)-MDMA is less neurotoxic than (S)-MDMA and MDMA or even non-neurotoxic, it may allow for greater clinical viability and prolonged regimens of drug-assisted psychotherapy.

(R)-MDMA and (S)-MDMA have shown equivalent effects in terms of inducing prosocial behavior in monkeys. However, (S)-MDMA shows higher potency, whereas (R)-MDMA shows greater maximal effects. Conversely, (S)-MDMA does not increase prosocial behavior in mice, whereas both MDMA and (R)-MDMA do so. MDMA and (S)-MDMA increase locomotor activity, a measure of psychostimulant-like effect, in rodents, whereas (R)-MDMA does not do so. (R)-MDMA likewise showed fewer reinforcing effects than (S)-MDMA in non-human primates. These findings further add to (R)-MDMA showing reduced psychostimulant-like and addictive effects compared to MDMA and (S)-MDMA.

MDMA, MDA, and enantiomers at serotonin 5-HT_{2} receptors
Compound	5-HT_{2A}		5-HT_{2B}		5-HT_{2C}	
Compound	EC_{50} (nM)	E_{max}	EC_{50} (nM)	E_{max}	EC_{50} (nM)	E_{max}
Serotonin	53	92%	1.0	100%	22	91%
MDA	1,700	57%	190	80%	ND	ND
(S)-MDA	18,200	89%	100	81%	7,400	73%
(R)-MDA	5,600	95%	150	76%	7,400	76%
MDMA	6,100	55%	2,000–>20,000	32%	ND	ND
(S)-MDMA	10,300	9%	6,000	38%	2,600	53%
(R)-MDMA	3,100	21%	900	27%	5,400	27%
Notes: The smaller the K_{act} or EC_{50} value, the more strongly the compound produces the effect. Refs:

=== Pharmacokinetics ===
The elimination half-life of (S)-MDMA is 4.1 hours, whereas the half-life of (R)-MDMA is 12 to 14 hours. In the case of racemic MDMA administration, the half-life of (S)-MDMA is 5.1 hours and the half-life of (R)-MDMA is 11 hours. (R)-MDMA shows cytochrome P450 CYP2D6 inhibition and lower levels of the metabolite 4-hydroxy-3-methoxymethamphetamine (HMMA) than (S)-MDMA.

== History ==
(R)-MDMA was first described in the scientific literature in enantiopure form by 1978. It was described in a paper authored by Alexander Shulgin, David E. Nichols, and other colleagues.

== Society and culture ==
=== Legal status ===
==== Canada ====
As an enantiomer of MDMA, (R)-MDMA is a Schedule I controlled substance in Canada.

==== United States ====
As an enantiomer of MDMA, (R)-MDMA is a Schedule I controlled substance in the United States.

== Research ==
(R)-MDMA is under development separately by AtaiBeckley, Empath Biosciences (EmpathBio) and Definium Therapeutics (formerly MindMed). It is being developed by AtaiBeckley for social anxiety disorder, by Empath Biosciences for the treatment of PTSD and social phobia and it is being developed by Definium Therapeutics for the treatment of PDDs or autism. As of February 2026, the drug is in phase 2 clinical trials for social phobia and autistic spectrum disorders, whereas no recent development has been reported for PTSD. The results of AtaiBeckley's phase 2a trial for treatment of social phobia have been released, with the drug showing moderate effectiveness and a generally favorable safety profile for this indication.

== See also ==
- Substituted methylenedioxyphenethylamine
- List of investigational hallucinogens and entactogens
- List of investigational autism and pervasive developmental disorder drugs
- List of investigational social anxiety disorder drugs
