= Ethyltrifluoromethylaminoindane =

Chemical compound

ETAI

Clinical data
- Other names: ETAI; N-Ethyl-5-trifluoromethyl-2-aminoindane
- Drug class: Serotonin releasing agent; Entactogen

Identifiers
- IUPAC name: N-ethyl-5-(trifluoromethyl)-2,3-dihydro-1H-inden-2-amine
- CAS Number: 205652-94-4
- PubChem CID: 10331389
- ChemSpider: 8506849
- UNII: SU92GOM6PI
- CompTox Dashboard (EPA): DTXSID701028480

Chemical and physical data
- Formula: C_{12}H_{14}F_{3}N
- Molar mass: 229.246 g·mol^{−1}
- 3D model (JSmol): Interactive image
- SMILES: CCNC1CC2=C(C1)C=C(C=C2)C(F)(F)F
- InChI: InChI=1S/C12H14F3N/c1-2-16-11-6-8-3-4-10(12(13,14)15)5-9(8)7-11/h3-5,11,16H,2,6-7H2,1H3; Key:PHTXVQQRWJXYPP-UHFFFAOYSA-N

N-Ethyl-5-trifluoromethyl-2-aminoindane (ETAI) is a drug of the 2-aminoindane family with putative entactogenic effects. It functions as a serotonin releasing agent (SRA). ETAI is the 2-aminoindane analogue of fenfluramine and has approximately 50% of the serotonergic neurotoxicity in comparison. In drug discrimination testing, ETAI only partially substituted for MBDB.

== See also ==
- Substituted 2-aminoindane
- 5-Trifluoromethyl-2-aminoindane (TAI)
