= MEAI =

Chemical compound

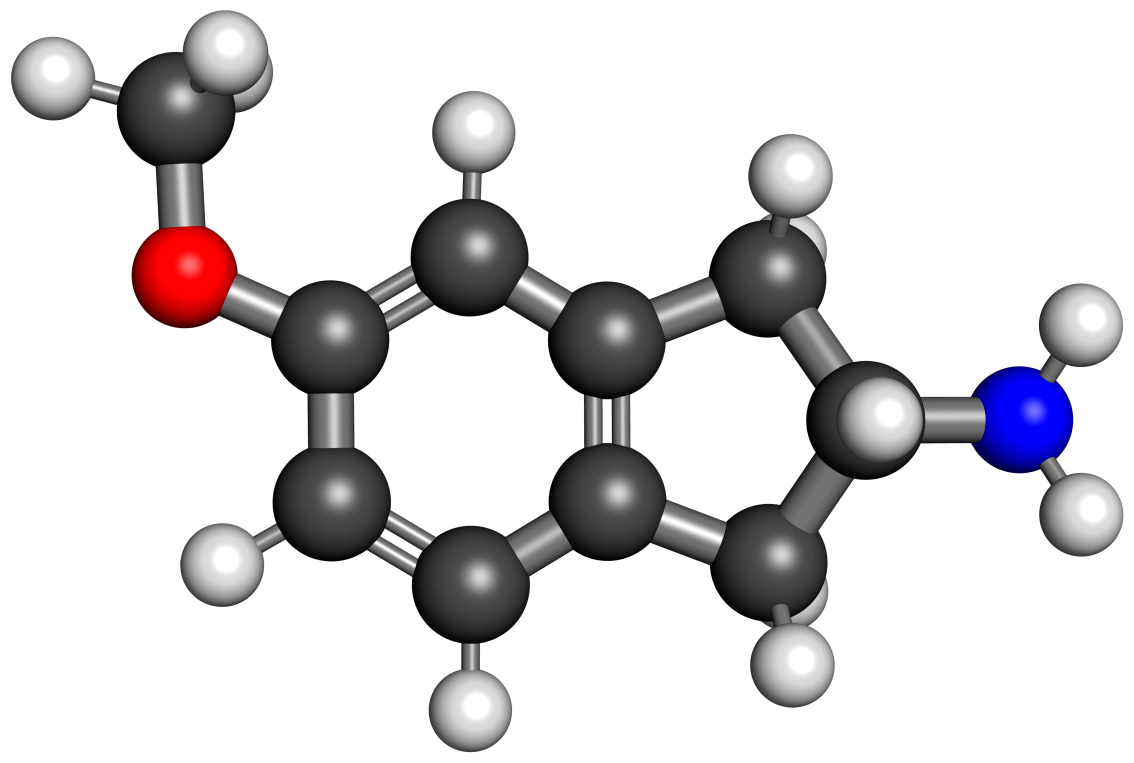

Clinical data
- Other names: 5-MeO-AI; 5-MeO-2-AI; 5-Methoxy-2-aminoindane; 5-Methoxy-2-aminoindan; Methoxyaminoindane; Chaperon; Pace; CMND-100; CMND100
- Routes of administration: Oral, Intranasal
- Drug class: Serotonin–norepinephrine releasing agent (SNRA); Selective serotonin releasing agent (SSRA); Psychoactive drug; Entactogen
- ATC code: None

Legal status
- Legal status: DE: NpSG (Industrial and scientific use only); UK: Under Psychoactive Substances Act; In general: unscheduled

Identifiers
- IUPAC name: 5-methoxy-2-aminoindane
- CAS Number: 73305-09-6
- PubChem CID: 12147687
- ChemSpider: 11591017
- UNII: AD8S15863A
- CompTox Dashboard (EPA): DTXSID80478566

Chemical and physical data
- Formula: C_{10}H_{13}NO
- Molar mass: 163.220 g·mol^{−1}
- 3D model (JSmol): Interactive image
- SMILES: COC1=CC2=C(CC(C2)N)C=C1
- InChI: InChI=1S/C10H13NO/c1-12-10-3-2-7-4-9(11)5-8(7)6-10/h2-3,6,9H,4-5,11H2,1H3; Key:HLXHCNWEVQNNKA-UHFFFAOYSA-N

MEAI, also known as 5-methoxy-2-aminoindane (5-MeO-AI) and by its developmental code name CMND-100, is an entactogen of the 2-aminoindane family. It is a cyclized phenethylamine and is the 2-aminoindane analogue of 3-methoxyamphetamine. The drug acts as a serotonin–norepinephrine releasing agent (SNRA), with about 6-fold preference for the release of serotonin over norepinephrine. MEAI has been encountered as a novel designer recreational drug. It is also under development for potential medical use in the treatment of alcoholism, cocaine use disorder, metabolic syndrome, and obesity.

== Use and effects ==
When used recreationally, MEAI is reported to produce mild to moderate psychoactive effects, including stimulation and euphoria. Its dose is said to be 100 to 250 mg orally and 30 to 60 mg intranasally. The drug is sometimes used as an alcohol substitute.

== Pharmacology ==
=== Pharmacodynamics ===
MEAI acts as a serotonin–norepinephrine releasing agent (SNRA), with a 6-fold preference for induction of serotonin release over norepinephrine release and 20-fold over dopamine release. In addition to inducing monoamine release, MEAI has moderate affinity for the α_{2}-adrenergic receptor. Based on these findings, MEAI may produce MDMA-like entactogenic and sympathomimetic effects and is likely to have reduced misuse liability in comparison.

Activities of 2-aminoindanes and amphetamine relatives
Compound	Monoamine release (EC_{50}, nM)			Ref
Compound	Serotonin	Norepinephrine	Dopamine	Ref
2-AI	>10,000	86	439	
MDAI	114	117	1,334	
MMAI	31	3,101	>10,000	
MEAI	134	861	2,646	
d-Amphetamine	698–1,765	6.6–7.2	5.8–24.8	
MDA	160–162	47–108	106–190	
MDMA	50–85	54–110	51–278	
3-MA	ND	58.0	103	
Notes: The smaller the value, the more strongly the compound produces the effect. The assays were done in rat brain synaptosomes and human potencies may be different. See also Monoamine releasing agent § Activity profiles for a larger table with more compounds. Refs:

== Chemistry ==
MEAI, also known as 5-methoxy-2-aminoindane, is a substituted 2-aminoindane derivative. It is a cyclized phenethylamine and is the 2-aminoindane analogue of the amphetamine 3-methoxyamphetamine.

== History ==
MEAI appears to have been first synthesized in 1956. The 2-aminoindane family of compounds was perhaps first chemically described in 1980. MEAI's molecular structure was first mentioned implicitly in a markush structure schema appearing in a patent from 1998. It was later described by David Nutt and colleagues as a potential preventative against binge drinking in the mid-2010s and thereafter. The drug also emerged as a novel designer recreational drug by the mid-2010s.

=== Alcohol substitute ===
MEAI was an early candidate of alcohol replacement drugs that came to market during a late-2010s movement to replace alcohol with less-toxic alternatives advocated by British psychopharmacologist David Nutt and others.

In an act of gonzo journalism, Michael Slezak writing for New Scientist, tried and reported on his experience with MEAI following an interview. Ezekiel Golan is said to have developed MEAI and originally intended for it to be sold as a legal high, but changed his mind, indicating plans to work with Nutt and his company DrugScience. The goal was to develop MEAI further as a "binge behaviour regulator" and "alcoholic beverage substitute".

In 2018, a company called Diet Alcohol Corporation of the Americas (DACOA) began openly marketing an MEAI-based drink called "Pace" for sale in the United States and Canada. Pace was described as a 50 mL bottle containing 160 mg of MEAI in mineral water. Distribution halted after Health Canada released a warning indicating the substance was considered illegal to market for consumption in Canada due to structural similarity to amphetamine. After this, Golan revealed himself to be the developer of Pace. He claimed that the MEAI featured in Pace was "manufactured in India" and "bottled in Delaware". Health Canada provided a statement to CBC News stating "Pace is an illegal and unauthorized product in Canada."

== Research ==
MEAI, under the developmental code name CMND-100, is under development by Clearmind Medicine for the treatment of alcoholism, cocaine use disorder, metabolic syndrome, and obesity. As of February 2026, it is in phase 1/2 clinical trials for treatment of alcoholism and is in the preclinical stage of development for all other indications.

== See also ==
- Substituted 2-aminoindane
- Cyclized phenethylamine
- List of investigational hallucinogens and entactogens
