= Borax combo =

Designer drug combination mimicking MDMA

- 5-MAPB

- 2-FMA

5-MeO-MiPT (left) and 4-HO-MET (right)

Combination of
- 5-MAPB: Serotonin–norepinephrine–dopamine releasing agent; Entactogen
- MDAI: Serotonin–norepinephrine releasing agent; Entactogen
- 2-FMA: Psychostimulant; Norepinephrine–dopamine releasing agent
- 5-MeO-MiPT: Serotonergic psychedelic; Non-selective serotonin receptor agonist
- 4-HO-MET: Serotonergic psychedelic; Non-selective serotonin receptor agonist

Clinical data
- Trade names: Blue Bliss; Pink Star; MaXTC
- Other names: Borax combination; Borax molly
- Routes of administration: Oral
- ATC code: None

The Borax combo, also known as Borax molly and by informal brand names like Blue Bliss and Pink Star, is a combination recreational and designer drug with multiple components which is described as an MDMA-like entactogen.

It is a mixture of the entactogen 5-MAPB or MDAI, the stimulant 2-fluoromethamphetamine (2-FMA), and the serotonergic psychedelic 5-MeO-MiPT or 4-HO-MET, all at specific fixed doses. Contrary to its name, the Borax combo does not contain or have anything to do with the substance borax.

The Borax combo is anecdotally claimed to closely mimic the effects and "magic" of MDMA ("ecstasy"). It also appears likely to produce serotonergic neurotoxicity similarly to MDMA.

The combination was first described by a user named Borax on the social media website Reddit by 2014 and has received increasing forensic and scientific attention since then. It has been encountered as a novel designer drug in the form of ecstasy-like pressed tablets under names like Blue Bliss and Pink Star. In addition, the Borax combo has received scientific interest from researchers like Matthew Baggott due to its apparent ability to closely mimic the effects of MDMA.

== Components ==
The Borax combo is a mixture of three distinct monoaminergic drugs with different mechanisms of action and employed at specific fixed doses:

1. 5-MAPB or MDAI, entactogens acting as serotonin–norepinephrine–dopamine releasing agents (SNDRA) or serotonin–norepinephrine releasing agents (SNRA)
2. 2-Fluoromethamphetamine (2-FMA), an amphetamine-like psychostimulant and probable norepinephrine–dopamine releasing agent (NDRA)
3. 5-MeO-MiPT or 4-HO-MET, serotonergic psychedelics and non-selective serotonin receptor agonists including of the serotonin 5-HT_{1} and 5-HT_{2} receptors among others

The specific doses of the components found in Borax combo tablets include 70 or 80 mg 5-MAPB, 20 mg 2-FMA, and 2 mg 5-MeO-MiPT or 3.5 mg 4-HO-MET, all taken orally.

MDAI was initially used as part of the Borax combo and was employed more frequently in the past. However, it was largely replaced by 5-MAPB as availability of MDAI became more limited. By itself, MDAI is reported to be entactogenic similarly to MDMA, but to be much less stimulating and to produce very little euphoria. Conversely, 5-MAPB is said to be the MDMA analogue with the closest-known effects to those of MDMA, but to be less stimulating in comparison and to have less of a comedown or hangover.

It has been said that other drugs may also work as substitutes in the combination, such as amphetamine instead of 2-FMA and other tryptamines instead of 5-MeO-MiPT or 4-HO-MET.

== History ==
The Borax combo was first described by 2014 by a user named Borax in the r/drugs subreddit of the social media website Reddit. It was claimed by this poster to closely mimic the effects and "magic" of MDMA whilst purportedly having reduced or no neurotoxicity.

Subsequently, the Borax combo was encountered as a novel designer drug or "legal high" with growing prominence in 2020 and thereafter, as none of its several components were controlled substances (though see laws like the Federal Analogue Act). The combination has been sold online in the form of ecstasy-like pressed tablets under informal brand names such as Blue Bliss, Pink Star, and MaXTC, among others.

The Borax combo began to receive scientific attention by 2023 due to discussion by prominent entactogen researcher Matthew Baggott. It has also been covered by journalist Hamilton Morris, who discussed the combination with Baggott in an interview on improved MDMA alternatives.

== MDMA alternative ==
There is scientific interest in the development of alternatives to MDMA with better properties like improved safety and reduced neurotoxicity for potential use in medicine such as in entactogen-assisted psychotherapy. Despite its origins in online social media and the designer drug scene, researcher Matthew Baggott has described the Borax combo as indeed having remarkably similar or "indistinguishable" effects to those of MDMA. In relation to this, the combination's discovery represents a genuine historical milestone in the development of viable alternatives to MDMA.

Aside from the Borax combo, few or no other alternatives of MDMA that have been developed, including a variety of analogues like MDA, MDEA, MBDB, MDAI, MMAI, methylone, mephedrone, and 5-MAPB among others, have been said to closely mimic the effects and unique "magic" of MDMA. Baggott has described the difficulty in capturing the unique subjective "magic" of MDMA scientifically. Relatedly, it has been said that self-experimentation as part of the drug development process in the psychedelic medicine industry is widespread.

The unique properties of MDMA have been theorized by researchers like Baggott to be dependent on very specific mixtures and ratios of pharmacological activities, including combined serotonin, norepinephrine, and dopamine release and direct serotonin receptor agonism at specific levels. By combining multiple different drugs at specific fixed doses, as in the case of the Borax combo, such ratios of activities can be much more easily achieved than combining all of the activities in a single molecule, like in the rare case of MDMA.

== Neurotoxicity ==
The Borax combo, as well as 5-MAPB and MDAI, have been advertised as non-neurotoxic alternatives to MDMA. However, 5-MAPB has subsequently been found to be a serotonergic neurotoxin in rodents similarly to MDMA. It is thought that the serotonergic neurotoxicity of MDMA and related drugs may be dependent on simultaneous induction of serotonin and dopamine release, as combination of a non-neurotoxic serotonin releasing agent like MDAI or MMAI with amphetamine results in serotonergic neurotoxicity similar to that of MDMA. Besides the case of simultaneous induction of serotonin and dopamine release, serotonergic psychedelics (i.e., serotonin 5-HT_{2} receptor agonists) have been found to augment MDMA-induced striatal dopamine release and serotonergic neurotoxicity in rodents as well.

== See also ==
- Entactogen
- Mindstate Design Labs
