= BFAI =

Chemical compound

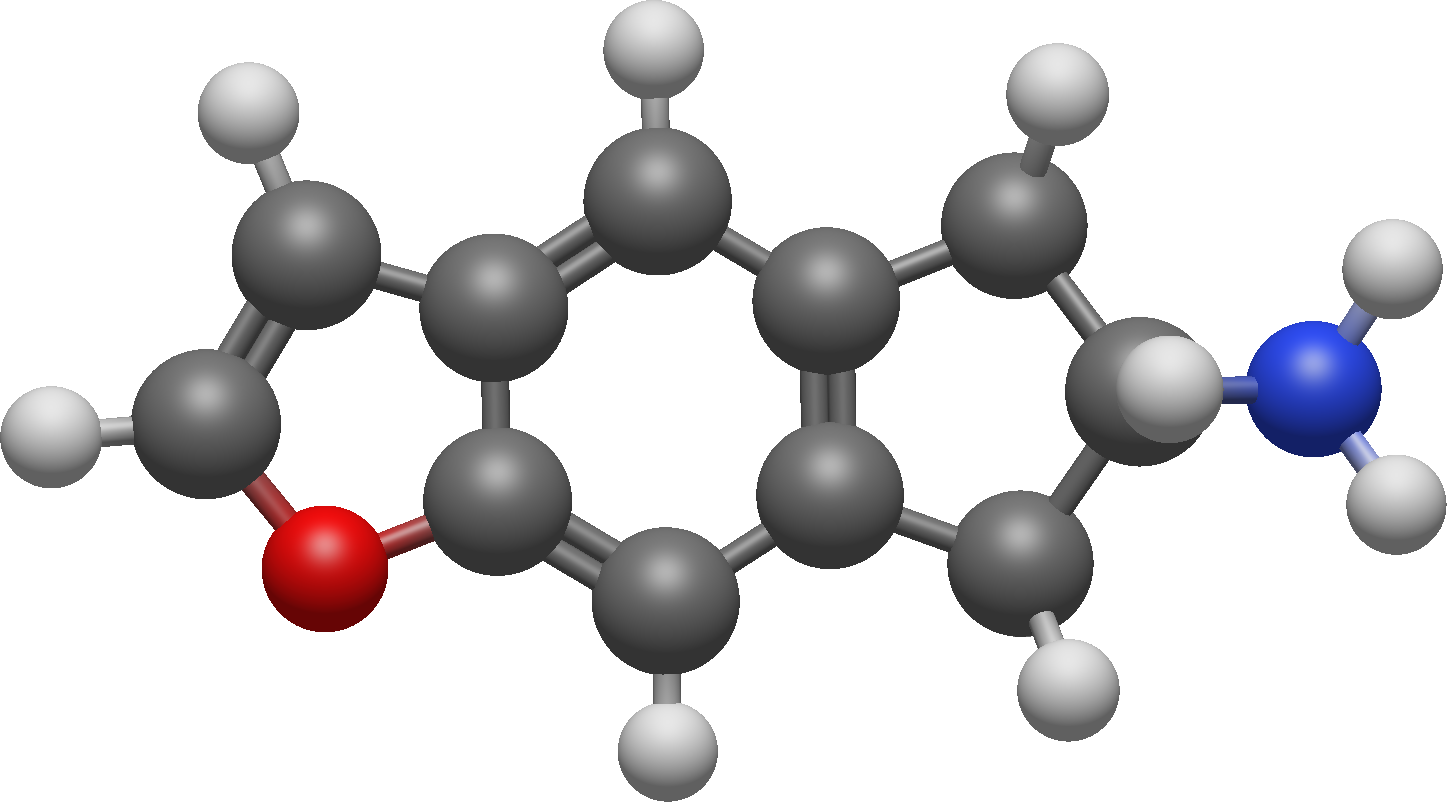

Clinical data
- Other names: 5,6-Benzofuranyl-2-aminoindane; 5,6-Benzofuranyl-2-aminoindan
- Drug class: Selective serotonin releasing agent; Entactogen
- ATC code: None

Identifiers
- IUPAC name: 6,7-dihydro-5H-cyclopenta[f][1]benzofuran-6-amine
- CAS Number: 2760617-90-9
- PubChem CID: 162728212

Chemical and physical data
- Formula: C_{11}H_{11}NO
- Molar mass: 173.215 g·mol^{−1}
- 3D model (JSmol): Interactive image
- SMILES: C1C(CC2=C1C=C3C=COC3=C2)N
- InChI: InChI=1S/C11H11NO/c12-10-4-8-3-7-1-2-13-11(7)6-9(8)5-10/h1-3,6,10H,4-5,12H2; Key:SYCRQDBZPIEBIR-UHFFFAOYSA-N

BFAI, also known as 5,6-benzofuranyl-2-aminoindane, is a drug of the 2-aminoindane family that was developed to act as a selective serotonin releasing agent (SSRA) and may produce entactogenic effects in humans, with potential psychotherapeutic applications. It is closely related to MDAI but with the benzodioxole ring system replaced by a benzofuran ring. The drug was patented by Matthew Baggott and Tactogen in 2022.

== See also ==
- Substituted 2-aminoindane
- 6-APB
- 5-MAPB
