= Trifluoromethylaminoindane =

Chemical compound

TAI

Clinical data
- Other names: 5-Trifluoromethyl-2-aminoindane; TAI
- Drug class: Serotonin releasing agent; Entactogen

Identifiers
- IUPAC name: 5-(trifluoromethyl)-2,3-dihydro-1H-inden-2-amine
- CAS Number: 205652-95-5
- PubChem CID: 10420351
- ChemSpider: 8595781
- UNII: TW974GB59E
- CompTox Dashboard (EPA): DTXSID401028481

Chemical and physical data
- Formula: C_{10}H_{10}F_{3}N
- Molar mass: 201.192 g·mol^{−1}
- 3D model (JSmol): Interactive image
- SMILES: C1C(CC2=C1C=CC(=C2)C(F)(F)F)N
- InChI: InChI=1S/C10H10F3N/c11-10(12,13)8-2-1-6-4-9(14)5-7(6)3-8/h1-3,9H,4-5,14H2; Key:UBDQCUBRYLGYCL-UHFFFAOYSA-N

5-Trifluoromethyl-2-aminoindane (TAI) is a drug of the 2-aminoindane family with putative entactogenic effects. It acts as a serotonin releasing agent (SRA). TAI is the 2-aminoindane analogue of norfenfluramine and has approximately 50% of the serotonergic neurotoxicity in comparison. In drug discrimination testing, TAI fully substituted for MBDB.

== See also ==
- Substituted 2-aminoindane
- N-Ethyl-5-trifluoromethyl-2-aminoindane (ETAI)
