= DOM-AI =

Clinical data
- Other names: DOMAI; 4,7-Dimethoxy-5-methyl-2-aminoindane; 2-Amino-4,7-dimethoxy-5-methylindane
- Drug class: Serotonergic psychedelic; Hallucinogen
- ATC code: None

Identifiers
- IUPAC name: 4,7-dimethoxy-5-methyl-2,3-dihydro-1H-inden-2-amine
- CAS Number: 52904-71-9
- PubChem CID: 3016787
- ChemSpider: 2284673
- ChEMBL: ChEMBL422189
- CompTox Dashboard (EPA): DTXSID40967380

Chemical and physical data
- Formula: C_{12}H_{17}NO_{2}
- Molar mass: 207.273 g·mol^{−1}
- 3D model (JSmol): Interactive image
- SMILES: CC1=CC(=C2CC(CC2=C1OC)N)OC
- InChI: InChI=1S/C12H17NO2/c1-7-4-11(14-2)9-5-8(13)6-10(9)12(7)15-3/h4,8H,5-6,13H2,1-3H3; Key:LBSOVXNUJAVVNS-UHFFFAOYSA-N

DOM-AI, also known as 4,7-dimethoxy-5-methyl-2-aminoindane, is a putative serotonergic psychedelic of the 2-aminoindane family and cyclic analogue of DOM. It was first described in the scientific literature by David E. Nichols and colleagues in 1974.

The drug fully substituted for LSD in rodent drug discrimination tests, suggesting that it may have hallucinogenic effects in humans. However, DOM-AI was much less potent than DOM in these tests, with an ED_{50} of 2.18 mg/kg, which was approximately 15-fold lower than that of DOM. Nonetheless, DOM-AI is still active in showing psychedelic-like effects in animals, unlike its analogues DOM-AT and DOM-CR.

Other cyclized analogues of DOM and related psychedelics besides DOM-AI, DOM-AT, and DOM-CR include DMCPA, TFMBOX, jimscaline, TCB-2, LPH-5, and ZC-B.

== See also ==
- Substituted 2-aminoindane
