= 5-IAI =

Chemical compound

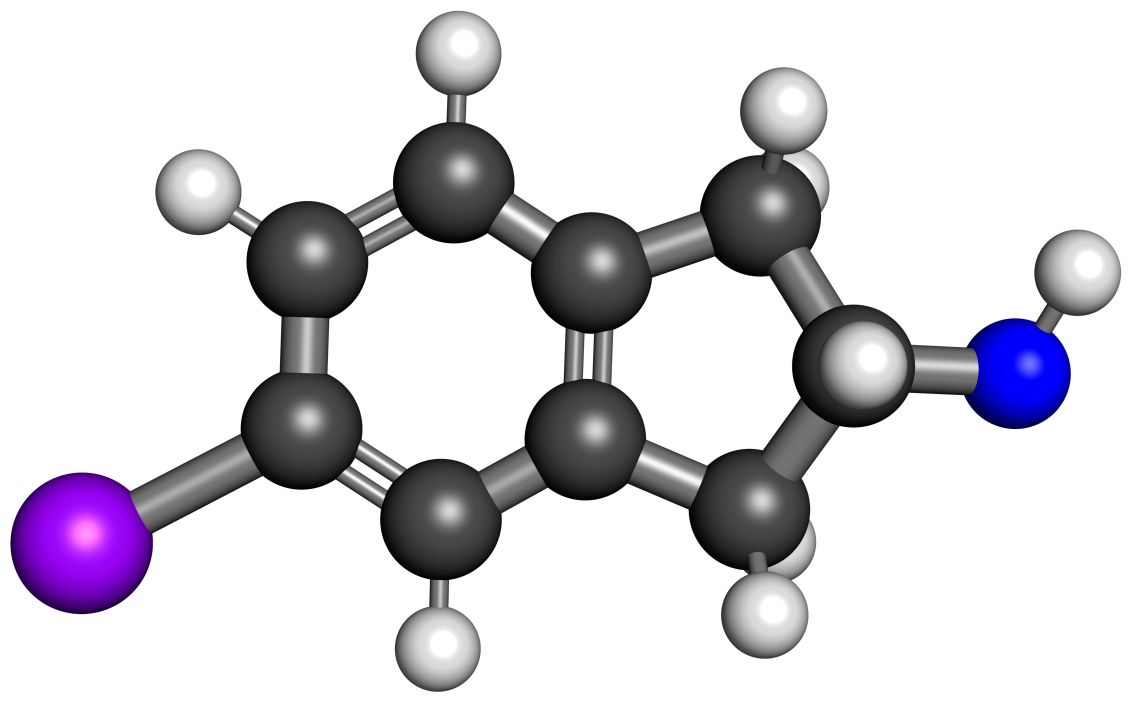

Clinical data
- Other names: 5-Iodo-2-aminoindane; 5-Iodo-2-aminoindan; 5-IAI; NRG-5
- Routes of administration: Oral
- Drug class: Serotonin–norepinephrine–dopamine releasing agent; Entactogen
- ATC code: None

Legal status
- Legal status: BR: Class F2 (Prohibited psychotropics); DE: NpSG (Industrial and scientific use only); UK: Under Psychoactive Substances Act; In general: uncontrolled

Pharmacokinetic data
- Duration of action: 2–4 hours

Identifiers
- IUPAC name: 5-iodo-2,3-dihydro-1H-inden-2-amine
- CAS Number: 132367-76-1
- PubChem CID: 131506
- ChemSpider: 116224
- UNII: 7X16E45Y1X
- CompTox Dashboard (EPA): DTXSID60927643

Chemical and physical data
- Formula: C_{9}H_{10}IN
- Molar mass: 259.090 g·mol^{−1}
- 3D model (JSmol): Interactive image
- SMILES: c2c1CC(N)Cc1ccc2I
- InChI: InChI=1S/C9H10IN/c10-8-2-1-6-4-9(11)5-7(6)3-8/h1-3,9H,4-5,11H2; Key:BIHPYCDDPGNWQO-UHFFFAOYSA-N

5-Iodo-2-aminoindane (5-IAI) is an entactogen of the 2-aminoindane family. The drug acts as a serotonin-norepinephrine-dopamine releasing agent (SNDRA) and produces much less serotonergic neurotoxicity than MDMA in animals.

5-IAI was developed in the 1990s by a team led by David E. Nichols at Purdue University. It was encountered as a novel recreational designer drug in 2010, but never gained widespread popularity.

== Use and effects ==
The human dosage of 5-IAI has been described as 100 to 200 mg and its duration of action as 2 to 4 hours. Human anecdotal reports suggest that 5-IAI is entactogenic and that it increases sociability and trust. On the other hand, it is reported that 5-IAI produces less euphoria and stimulation than MDMA and other amphetamines. Relatedly, 2-aminoindanes like 5-IAI never gained widespread popularity as recreational drugs.

== Pharmacology ==
=== Pharmacodynamics ===
Similarly to MDMA, 5-IAI acts as a serotonin–norepinephrine–dopamine releasing agent (SNDRA). While its EC_{50} values for the induction of monoamine release have not been reported, its relative potency for monoamine release is serotonin > dopamine > norepinephrine. In addition, 5-IAI's affinity (K_{i}) values for the monoamine transporters are 879 nM for the serotonin transporter (SERT), 311 nM for the norepinephrine transporter (NET), and 992 nM for the dopamine transporter (DAT), whereas its values in terms of functional inhibition have been reported to be 241 nM or 2,500 nM at SERT, 612 nM or 760 nM at NET, and 992 nM or 2,300 nM at DAT in two different respective studies.

In addition to its interactions with the monoamine transporters, 5-IAI shows high affinity for the serotonin 5-HT_{1A}, 5-HT_{2A}, 5-HT_{2B}, and 5-HT_{2C} receptors, as well as affinity for the α_{2A}-, α_{2B}-, and α_{2C}-adrenergic receptors. The high affinity for the serotonin receptors contrasts MDAI.

5-IAI and MDAI fully substitute for MDMA in drug discrimination tests in rodents. This suggests that they produce MDMA-like subjective effects in rodents.

Unlike related 2-aminoindane derivatives like MDAI and MMAI, 5-IAI causes some serotonergic neurotoxicity in rats (15% or less reduction of serotonergic markers), but is less neurotoxic than its corresponding amphetamine homologue para-iodoamphetamine. The doses employed have been described as "extremely high". In any case, regular high-dose 5-IAI has been found to produce cognitive and memory deficits in rodents.

== History ==
5-IAI was first described in the scientific literature by David E. Nichols and colleagues at Purdue University in 1991. It was encountered as a novel designer drug online in 2010 and in the United Kingdom in 2011.

== Society and culture ==
=== Legal status ===
==== Finland ====
Scheduled in the "government decree on psychoactive substances banned from the consumer market".

==== Sweden ====
Sweden's public health agency suggested classifying 5-IAI as a hazardous substance, on September 25, 2019.

== See also ==
- Substituted 2-aminoindane
- Cyclized phenethylamine
