= MDAT =

Chemical compound

Clinical data
- Other names: 6,7-MDAT; 6,7-Methylenedioxy-2-aminotetralin
- Drug class: Serotonin releasing agent; Entactogen
- ATC code: None

Legal status
- Legal status: In general: uncontrolled

Identifiers
- IUPAC name: 5,6,7,8-tetrahydrobenzo[f][1,3]benzodioxol-6-amine
- CAS Number: 101625-35-8; hydrochloride: 3446-21-8
- PubChem CID: 36483
- ChemSpider: 33531
- UNII: 28IR5LC41Q; hydrochloride: BOX4U52EET
- CompTox Dashboard (EPA): DTXSID501017047

Chemical and physical data
- Formula: C_{11}H_{13}NO_{2}
- Molar mass: 191.230 g·mol^{−1}
- 3D model (JSmol): Interactive image
- SMILES: C3Cc1cc2OCOc2cc1CC3N

MDAT, also known as 6,7-methylenedioxy-2-aminotetralin, is a drug of the 2-aminotetralin family developed in the 1990s by a team at Purdue University led by David E. Nichols. It appears to act as a serotonin releasing agent based on rodent drug discrimination assays comparing it to MDMA, in which it fully substitutes for, and additionally lacks any kind of serotonergic neurotoxicity. Hence, MDAT is considered likely to be a non-neurotoxic, putative entactogen in humans.

== See also ==
- Substituted 2-aminotetralin
- Substituted methylenedioxyphenethylamine
- Cyclized phenethylamine
