= NM-2-AI =

Chemical compound

Clinical data
- Other names: NM2AI; N-Methyl-2-aminoindane; N-Methyl-2-AI; N-Methyl-AI; AM-80; Methaminoindan; Methoaminoindane
- Drug class: Norepinephrine releasing agent; Stimulant
- ATC code: None

Legal status
- Legal status: DE: NpSG (Industrial and scientific use only); UK: Under Psychoactive Substances Act

Identifiers
- IUPAC name: N-Methyl-2,3-dihydro-1H-inden-2-amine
- CAS Number: 24445-44-1; HCl: 10408-85-2
- PubChem CID: 15023225
- ChemSpider: 13566342
- UNII: ZLW84Y27HG
- ChEMBL: ChEMBL1188235
- CompTox Dashboard (EPA): DTXSID901010100

Chemical and physical data
- Formula: C_{10}H_{13}N
- Molar mass: 147.221 g·mol^{−1}
- 3D model (JSmol): Interactive image
- SMILES: CNC2CC1=CC=CC=C1C2
- InChI: InChI=1S/C10H13N/c1-11-10-6-8-4-2-3-5-9(8)7-10/h2-5,10-11H,6-7H2,1H3; Key:SXWZQUCTTOBHJT-UHFFFAOYSA-N

NM-2-AI, or NM2AI, also known as N-methyl-2-aminoindane, is a stimulant of the 2-aminoindane family that has been sold online as a designer drug. It is a rigid analogue of methamphetamine. NM-2-AI acts as a selective norepinephrine releasing agent, with affinity for several monoamine receptors.

== Pharmacology ==
=== Pharmacodynamics ===
NM-2-AI acts as a highly selective norepinephrine reuptake inhibitor and releasing agent in vitro and does not release serotonin or dopamine even at very high concentrations (100 μM).

NM-2-AI has activity as a norepinephrine reuptake inhibitor (IC_{50} = 2.4 μM), as well as acting as a TAAR1 receptor agonist (EC_{50} = 3.3 μM), an α_{2A} adrenergic receptor agonist (K_{i} = 0.49 μM) and a ligand at the 5-HT1A (K_{i} = 3.6 μM) and 5-HT2A (K_{i} = 5.4 μM) receptors.

=== Pharmacokinetics ===
==== Metabolism ====
In mice, NM-2-AI is metabolized into seven primary urinary metabolites, including 2-AI, two hydroxylated metabolites of 2-AI, and four hydroxylated metabolites of NM-2-AI. One of the hydroxylated 2-AI metabolites, as well as one of the hydroxylated NM-2-AI metabolites, underwent conjugation. NM-2-AI and 2-AI were detected in the hair and blood.

== See also ==
- Substituted 2-aminoindane
