= MMAI =

Chemical compound

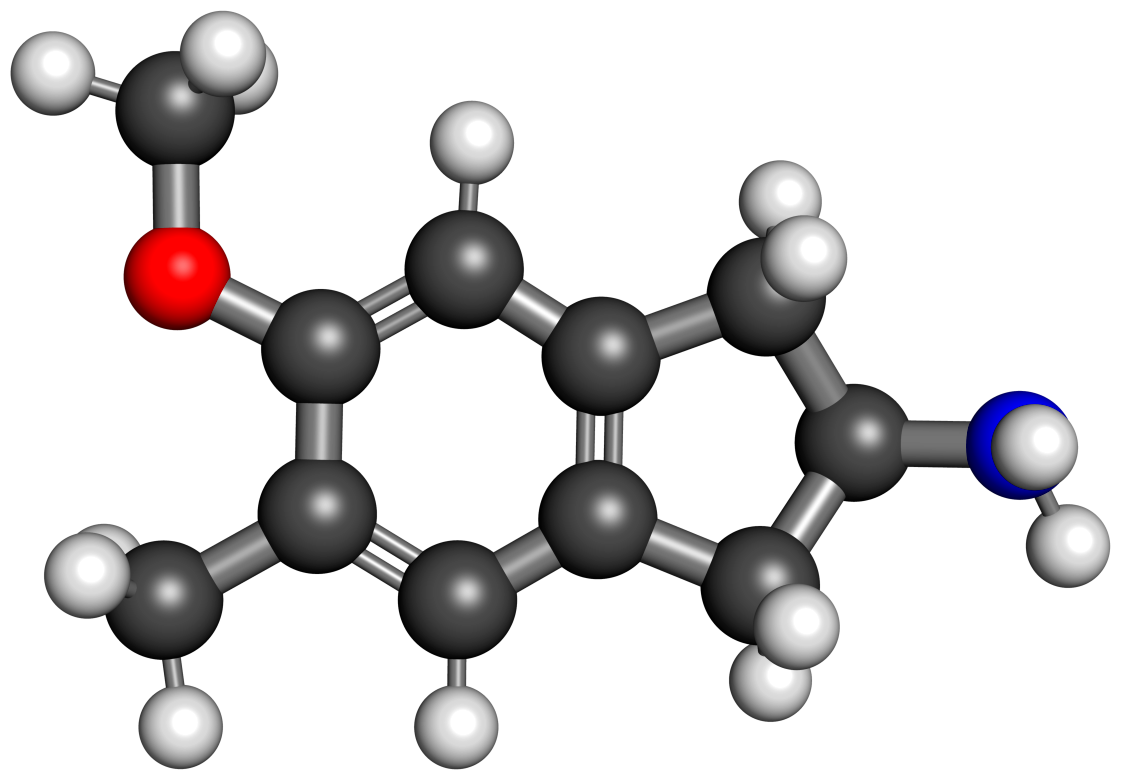

Clinical data
- Other names: MMAI; MMAi; 5-Methoxy-6-methyl-2-aminoindan
- Drug class: Selective serotonin releasing agent; Entactogen
- ATC code: None

Legal status
- Legal status: In general: uncontrolled

Identifiers
- IUPAC name: 5-Methoxy-6-methyl-2,3-dihydro-1H-inden-2-amine
- CAS Number: 136468-19-4
- PubChem CID: 131575
- ChemSpider: 116274
- UNII: JF10U4I82P
- CompTox Dashboard (EPA): DTXSID20927886

Chemical and physical data
- Formula: C_{11}H_{15}NO
- Molar mass: 177.247 g·mol^{−1}
- 3D model (JSmol): Interactive image
- SMILES: Cc1cc2CC(N)Cc2cc1OC
- InChI: InChI=1S/C11H15NO/c1-7-3-8-4-10(12)5-9(8)6-11(7)13-2/h3,6,10H,4-5,12H2,1-2H3; Key:JLESVLCTIOAHPT-UHFFFAOYSA-N

5-Methoxy-6-methyl-2-aminoindane (MMAI) is a drug of the 2-aminoindane family developed in the 1990s by a team led by David E. Nichols at Purdue University. It acts as a highly selective serotonin releasing agent (SSRA) with lower neurotoxicity than MDMA and produces entactogenic effects in humans. The drug has been sold as a designer drug online.

== Pharmacology ==
=== Pharmacodynamics ===
MMAI is one of the only known monoamine releasing agents with greater than 100-fold selectivity for the serotonin transporter (SERT) over the dopamine transporter (DAT). Receptor interaction data for MMAI have also been reported.

The drug has been found to dose-dependently and robustly increase oxytocin levels in rodents similarly to MDMA. It also increases prolactin and adrenocorticotropic hormone (ACTH) secretion in rodents. The ACTH secretion induced by MMAI could only be partially blocked by the serotonin reuptake inhibitor fluoxetine, suggesting that MMAI also has some other unknown mechanism to increase ACTH levels. This is unlikely to be dopamine or norepinephrine release as MMAI shows very low potency in such regards. In addition, fluoxetine did not block the renin response to MMAI, suggesting an additional mechanism for this effect as well.

MMAI has been shown to relieve stress-induced depression in rats more robustly than sertraline. As a result, it has been suggested that SSRAs like MMAI and 4-methylthioamphetamine (4-MTA) could be developed as novel antidepressants with a faster onset of therapeutic action and superior effectiveness compared to current antidepressants such as selective serotonin reuptake inhibitors (SSRIs).

MMAI alone at typical doses does not appear to produce serotonergic neurotoxicity with acute or chronic administration in animals. However, subsequent research found that a single high dose of MMAI could produce significant serotonergic neurotoxicity. In addition, coadministration of MMAI with the dopamine releasing agent dextroamphetamine has been found to produce dose-dependent serotonergic neurotoxicity in animals. Hence, MMAI is not a fully non-neurotoxic MDMA analogue.

Activities of 2-aminoindanes and amphetamine relatives
| Compound | Monoamine release (EC_{50}, nM) | | | Ref |
| Compound | Serotonin | Norepinephrine | Dopamine | Ref |
|---|---|---|---|---|
| 2-AI | >10,000 | 86 | 439 | |
| MDAI | 114 | 117 | 1,334 | |
| MMAI | 31 | 3,101 | >10,000 | |
| MEAI | 134 | 861 | 2,646 | |
| d-Amphetamine | 698–1,765 | 6.6–7.2 | 5.8–24.8 | |
| MDA | 160–162 | 47–108 | 106–190 | |
| MDMA | 50–85 | 54–110 | 51–278 | |
| 3-MA | ND | 58.0 | 103 | |
Notes: The smaller the value, the more strongly the compound produces the effect. The assays were done in rat brain synaptosomes and human potencies may be different. See also Monoamine releasing agent § Activity profiles for a larger table with more compounds. Refs:

== Chemistry ==
MMAI is the 2-aminoindane analogue of 3-methoxy-4-methylamphetamine (MMA).

== See also ==
- Substituted 2-aminoindane
- Cyclized phenethylamine
- PAL-335
