= Pyr-AI =

Clinical data
- Other names: 2-PYI; 2-Pyrrolidinylindane; 1-(2-Indanyl)pyrrolidine; Compound 10j
- Drug class: Stimulant
- ATC code: None

Identifiers
- IUPAC name: 1-(2,3-dihydro-1H-inden-2-yl)pyrrolidine
- CAS Number: 43152-60-9
- PubChem CID: 206203
- ChemSpider: 178662
- CompTox Dashboard (EPA): DTXSID60195729

Chemical and physical data
- Formula: C_{13}H_{17}N
- Molar mass: 187.286 g·mol^{−1}
- 3D model (JSmol): Interactive image
- SMILES: C1CCN(C1)C2CC3=CC=CC=C3C2
- InChI: InChI=1S/C13H17N/c1-2-6-12-10-13(9-11(12)5-1)14-7-3-4-8-14/h1-2,5-6,13H,3-4,7-10H2; Key:PAOQQDSGNKTTRU-UHFFFAOYSA-N

Pyr-AI, also known as 2-pyrrolidinylindane (2-PYI), is a stimulant drug of the 2-aminoindane family. It is the analogue of 2-aminoindane (2-AI) in which the amine has been replaced with a pyrrolidine group. The drug has been described as having strong and long-lasting amphetamine-like effects in rodents. Pyr-AI was first described in the scientific literature by 1973.

== See also ==
- Substituted 2-aminoindane
- Cyclized phenethylamine
- Phenylethylpyrrolidine
- Prolintane
