= Indanorex =

Chemical compound

Clinical data
- Trade names: Dietor
- Routes of administration: Oral
- Drug class: Stimulant; Appetite suppressant
- ATC code: None

Identifiers
- IUPAC name: 2-(1-aminopropyl)indan-2-ol
- CAS Number: 16112-96-2
- PubChem CID: 65623
- ChemSpider: 59064
- UNII: 982LOO7DEE
- ChEMBL: ChEMBL2105009
- CompTox Dashboard (EPA): DTXSID00864664

Chemical and physical data
- Formula: C_{12}H_{17}NO
- Molar mass: 191.274 g·mol^{−1}
- 3D model (JSmol): Interactive image
- SMILES: OC2(Cc1ccccc1C2)C(N)CC
- InChI: InChI=1S/C12H17NO/c1-2-11(13)12(14)7-9-5-3-4-6-10(9)8-12/h3-6,11,14H,2,7-8,13H2,1H3; Key:QTZFSVVIXMRRLW-UHFFFAOYSA-N

Indanorex, sold under the brand name Dietor, is a stimulant drug which was developed in the 1970s. It has appetite suppressant effects and also has antihypoglycemia effects. A chemical synthesis has been reported.

== See also ==
- Aminoindane
- ALPHA (drug)
