= Aprindine =

Antiarrhythmic drug

Clinical data
- AHFS/Drugs.com: International Drug Names
- ATC code: C01BB04 (WHO)

Identifiers
- IUPAC name: {3-[2,3-dihydro-1H-inden-2-yl(phenyl)amino]propyl}diethylamine
- CAS Number: 37640-71-4
- PubChem CID: 2218
- DrugBank: DB01429
- ChemSpider: 2132
- UNII: 5Y48085P9Q
- KEGG: D02969
- ChEMBL: ChEMBL1213033
- CompTox Dashboard (EPA): DTXSID3022615

Chemical and physical data
- Formula: C_{22}H_{30}N_{2}
- Molar mass: 322.496 g·mol^{−1}
- 3D model (JSmol): Interactive image
- SMILES: c1cccc3c1CC(N(c2ccccc2)CCCN(CC)CC)C3
- InChI: InChI=1S/C22H30N2/c1-3-23(4-2)15-10-16-24(21-13-6-5-7-14-21)22-17-19-11-8-9-12-20(19)18-22/h5-9,11-14,22H,3-4,10,15-18H2,1-2H3; Key:NZLBHDRPUJLHCE-UHFFFAOYSA-N

Aprindine is a Class 1b antiarrhythmic agent of the 2-aminoindane family and has antiarrhythmic properties similar to lidocaine.

== See also ==
- Substituted 2-aminoindane
