= Indantadol =

Chemical compound

Clinical data
- Routes of administration: Oral
- ATC code: none

Legal status
- Legal status: In general: uncontrolled

Identifiers
- IUPAC name: N-(2,3-dihydro-1H-inden-2-yl)glycinamide
- CAS Number: 202844-10-8
- ChemSpider: 16017060
- UNII: Z3867B9SQP
- CompTox Dashboard (EPA): DTXSID00942416

Chemical and physical data
- Formula: C_{11}H_{14}N_{2}O
- Molar mass: 190.246 g·mol^{−1}
- 3D model (JSmol): Interactive image
- SMILES: NCC(=O)NC1Cc2ccccc2C1

Indantadol (developmental code names CHF-3381, V-3381) is a drug of the 2-aminoindane family which was formerly being investigated as an anticonvulsant and neuroprotective and is now under development for the treatment of neuropathic pain and chronic cough in Europe by Vernalis and Chiesi. It acts as a competitive, reversible, and non-selective monoamine oxidase inhibitor, and as a low affinity, non-competitive NMDA receptor antagonist. A pilot study of indantadol for chronic cough was initiated in October 2009 and in April 2010 it failed to achieve significant efficacy in neuropathic pain in phase IIb clinical trials.

== See also ==
- Substituted 2-aminoindane
- Glycine
