= MDMAI =

Chemical compound

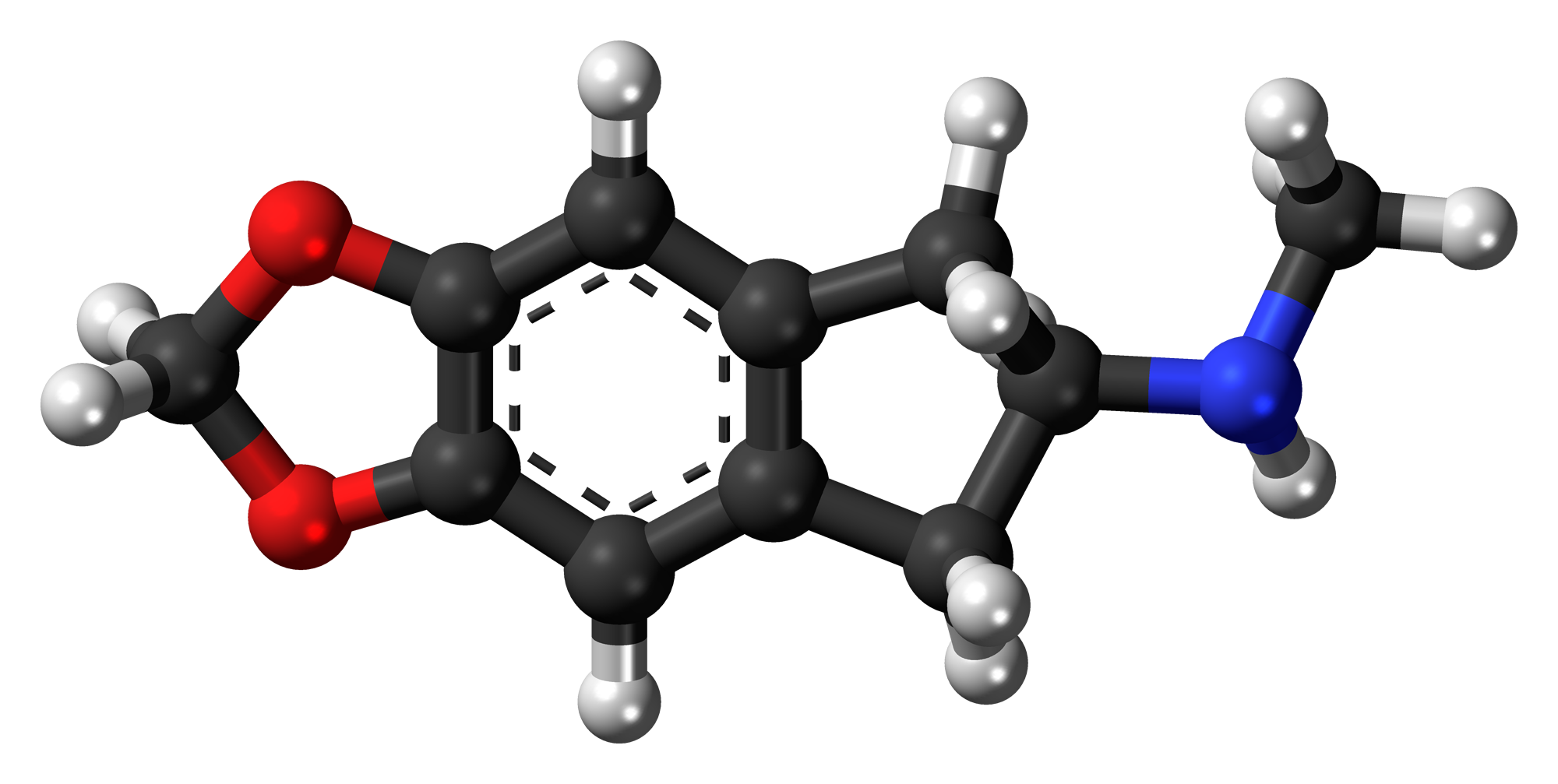

Clinical data
- Other names: 5,6-Methylenedioxy-N-methyl-2-aminoindane; MDMAI
- Drug class: Serotonin releasing agent; Entactogen
- ATC code: None

Legal status
- Legal status: DE: NpSG (Industrial and scientific use only); UK: Under Psychoactive Substances Act

Identifiers
- IUPAC name: N-methyl-6,7-dihydro-5H-cyclopenta[f][1,3]benzodioxol-6-amine
- CAS Number: 132741-82-3
- PubChem CID: 125559
- ChemSpider: 111695
- UNII: 5N88M9ZTD8
- CompTox Dashboard (EPA): DTXSID20157742

Chemical and physical data
- Formula: C_{11}H_{13}NO_{2}
- Molar mass: 191.230 g·mol^{−1}
- 3D model (JSmol): Interactive image
- SMILES: C3c2cc1OCOc1cc2CC3NC
- InChI: InChI=1S/C11H13NO2/c1-12-9-2-7-4-10-11(14-6-13-10)5-8(7)3-9/h4-5,9,12H,2-3,6H2,1H3; Key:KNZKMFXEUONVMF-UHFFFAOYSA-N

MDMAI, also known as 5,6-methylenedioxy-N-methyl-2-aminoindane, is a drug of the 2-aminoindane family developed in the 1990s by a team led by David E. Nichols at Purdue University. It acts as a non-neurotoxic serotonin releasing agent (SRA) in animals and is a putative entactogen in humans.

== Chemistry ==
MDMAI can be thought of as a cyclized analogue of MDMA where the α-methyl group of the alkylamino side chain has been joined back round to the 6-position of the aromatic ring to form an indane ring system. This changes the core structure of the molecule from phenethylamine to 2-aminoindane, and causes the pharmacological properties of the two compounds to be substantially different.

== History ==
MDMAI was first described in the scientific literature by David E. Nichols and colleagues in 1990.

== See also ==
- Substituted 2-aminoindane
- Substituted methylenedioxyphenethylamine
- Cyclized phenethylamine
