= 3,4-Methylenedioxy-N-ethylamphetamine =

Chemical compound

MDEA

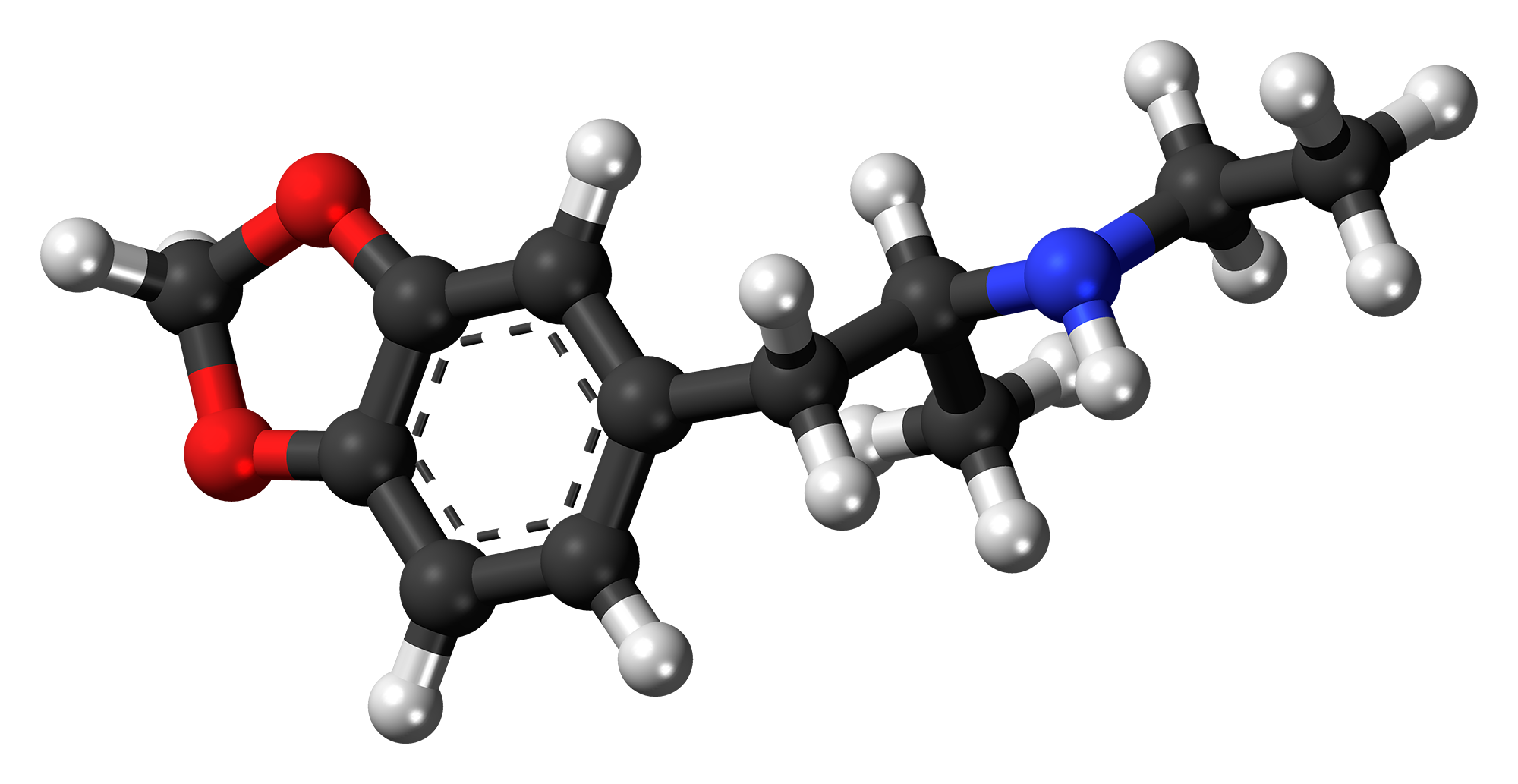

Clinical data
- Other names: MDEA; MDE; 3,4-Methylenedioxy-N-ethylamphetamine; N-Ethyl-MDA; Eve; EA-1304; EA1304; PAL-192; PAL192; ASR-1003; ASR1003
- Routes of administration: Oral, insufflation, injection, rectal
- Drug class: Serotonin releasing agent; Entactogen
- ATC code: None

Legal status
- Legal status: AU: S9 (Prohibited substance); BR: Class F2 (Prohibited psychotropics); CA: Schedule I; DE: Anlage I (Authorized scientific use only); UK: Class A; US: Schedule I; UN: Psychotropic Schedule I

Pharmacokinetic data
- Metabolism: Hepatic including CYP2D6 and CYP3A4
- Onset of action: 20–85 minutes
- Elimination half-life: (R)-MDEA: 7.5 ± 2.4 hours (S)-MDEA: 4.2 ± 1.4 hours
- Duration of action: 3–5 hours
- Excretion: Renal

Identifiers
- IUPAC name: 1-(1,3-benzodioxol-5-yl)-N-ethylpropan-2-amine
- CAS Number: 82801-81-8
- PubChem CID: 105039
- ChemSpider: 94775
- UNII: ML1I4KK67B
- KEGG: C22717
- ChEBI: CHEBI:132237
- CompTox Dashboard (EPA): DTXSID70860971
- ECHA InfoCard: 100.231.031

Chemical and physical data
- Formula: C_{12}H_{17}NO_{2}
- Molar mass: 207.273 g·mol^{−1}
- 3D model (JSmol): Interactive image
- SMILES: CCNC(C)Cc1ccc2OCOc2c1

3,4-Methylenedioxy-N-ethylamphetamine (MDEA; also called MDE and colloquially, Eve) is an empathogenic psychoactive drug. MDEA is a substituted amphetamine and a substituted methylenedioxyphenethylamine. MDEA acts as a serotonin, norepinephrine, and dopamine releasing agent and reuptake inhibitor.

Possession of MDEA is illegal in most countries. Some limited exceptions exist for scientific and medical research.

== Uses ==
=== Medical ===
MDEA currently has no accepted medical uses.

=== Recreational ===
MDEA is used recreationally in a similar manner to MDMA (also called ecstasy), however the subjective effects of MDEA are milder and shorter lasting. Alexander Shulgin reported it to be stoning in high doses. Most frequently consumed orally, recreational doses of MDEA are in the range 100 to 200 mg. Infrequently, MDEA is an adulterant of ecstasy pills. Studies conducted in the 1990s found MDEA present in approximately four percent of ecstasy tablets.

== Adverse effects ==
Reported adverse effects from MDEA include the following:

- Hyperthermia
- Mydriasis
- Loss of appetite

== Overdose ==
Reported overdose symptoms of MDEA include the following:

- Disseminated intravascular coagulation
- Muscle rigidity
- Rhabdomyolysis
- Convulsions
- Tachycardia
- Hypotension
- Sweating

== Chemistry ==
=== Synthesis ===
The chemical synthesis of MDEA has been described. It is typically synthesized from essential oils such as safrole or piperonal.

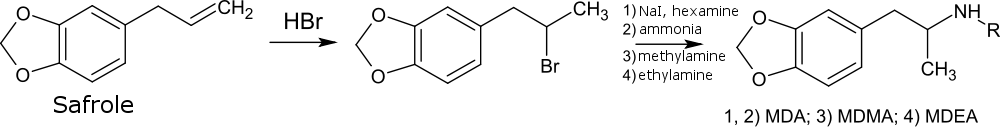

== History ==
Alexander Shulgin conducted research on methylenedioxy compounds in the 1960s. In a 1967 lab notebook entry, Shulgin briefly mentioned a colleague's report of no effect from the substance with a 100 mg dose. Shulgin later characterized the substance in his book PiHKAL.

== Society and culture ==
=== Legal status ===
==== United States ====
In the United States, MDEA was introduced recreationally in 1985 as a legal substitute to the newly banned MDMA. MDEA was made a Schedule 1 substance in the United States on October 15, 1987.

== See also ==
- Substituted methylenedioxyphenethylamine
- 3-Fluoroethamphetamine
- 4-Methoxyethamphetamine
- Fenfluramine
