= Entactogen =

Class of psychoactive drugs that produce empathic experiences

- Drug class
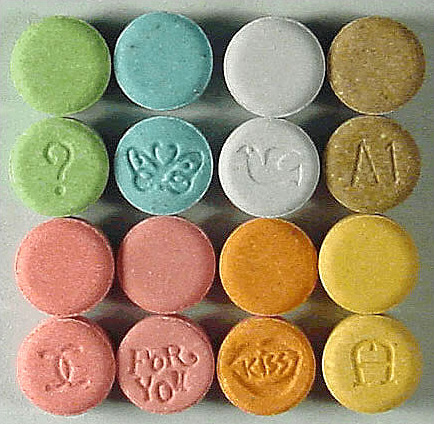
- A selection of MDMA pills, which are often nicknamed "Ecstasy" or "X"

Class identifiers
- Synonyms: Entactogen; Empathogen; Connectogen
- Use: Recreational, spiritual, medical, microdosing
- Mechanism of action: Serotonin–norepinephrine–dopamine releasing agent; Serotonin 5-HT_{2} receptor agonism
- Biological target: Serotonin transporter; Norepinephrine transporter; Dopamine transporter; Serotonin 5-HT_{2} receptors
- Chemical class: Amphetamines, MDxx, cathinones, benzofurans, α-alkyltryptamines, 2-aminoindanes, others

Legal status
- Legal status: Variable

Entactogens, also known as empathogens or connectogens, are a class of psychoactive drugs that induce experiences of emotional communion, oneness, connectedness, emotional openness—that is, empathy—as particularly observed and reported for experiences with MDMA (ecstasy). This class of drug is distinguished from the classes of hallucinogens or psychedelics and stimulants, although entactogens, for instance MDMA, can also have these properties. Entactogens are used both as recreational drugs and are being investigated for medical use in the treatment of psychiatric disorders, for instance MDMA-assisted therapy for post-traumatic stress disorder (PTSD).

Notable members of this class include the methylenedioxyphenethylamines (MDxx) MDMA, MDA, MDEA, MDOH, MBDB, and methylone, the benzofurans 5-APB, 5-MAPB, 6-APB, and 6-MAPB, the cathinone mephedrone, the 2-aminoindane MDAI, and the α-alkyltryptamine αET, among others. Most entactogens are amphetamines, although some, such as αET, are tryptamines. When referring to MDMA and its counterparts, the term MDxx is often used (with the exception of certain non-entactogen drugs like MDPV).

Entactogens act as serotonin releasing agents (SRAs) as their key action. However, entactogens also frequently have additional actions, such as induction of dopamine and norepinephrine and serotonin 5-HT_{2} receptor agonism, which contributes to their effects as well. It is thought that dopamine and norepinephrine release provide additional stimulant, euphoriant, and cardiovascular or sympathomimetic effects, serotonin 5-HT_{2A} receptor agonism produces psychedelic effects of variable intensity, and both dopamine release and serotonin 5-HT_{2} receptor agonism may enhance the entactogenic effects and be critically involved in allowing for the qualitative "magic" of these drugs. Entactogens that simultaneously induce serotonin and dopamine release, for instance MDMA, may produce serotonergic neurotoxicity with associated cognitive and memory deficits as well as psychiatric changes. However, these effects are tied to larger and/or more frequent doses of MDMA in humans, while the doses that elicit neurotoxicity and cognitive deficits in animal models are typically larger than those used in clinical settings and by most recreational users.

MDA and MDMA were both first synthesized independently in the early 1910s. The psychoactive effects of MDA were discovered in 1930 but were not described until the 1950s, MDA and MDMA emerged as recreational drugs in the 1960s, and the unique entactogenic effects of MDMA were first described in the 1970s. Entactogens as a unique pharmacological class depending on induction of serotonin release was established in the mid-1980s and novel entactogens such as MBDB were developed at this time and after. Gordon Alles discovered the psychoactive effects of MDA, Alexander Shulgin played a key role in bringing awareness to MDMA and its unique effects, and Ralph Metzner and David E. Nichols formally defined entactogens and established them as a distinct class of drugs. Many entactogens like MDMA are controlled substances throughout the world.

== Uses ==
=== Recreational ===
Entactogens are used as recreational drugs, including notably at raves.

=== Medical ===
Psychiatrists began using entactogens as psychotherapy tools in the 1970s despite the lack of clinical trials. In recent years, the scientific community has been revisiting the possible therapeutic uses of entactogens. Therapeutic models using MDMA have been studied because of its entactogenic properties. This type of therapy would be applicable for treating a patient who was experiencing psychological trauma such as PTSD. Traumatic memories can be linked to fear in the patients which makes engaging with these memories difficult. Administration of an entactogen such as MDMA allows the patient to disconnect from the fear associated with the traumatic memories and engage in therapy. MDMA acts by targeting the body's stress response in order to cause this therapeutic effect. In addition to reducing anxiety and a conditioned fear response, MDMA also reduces the avoidance of feelings. Patients are then able to trust themselves and their therapist and engage with traumatic memories under the influence of MDMA.

Although the therapeutic effects of entactogens may be promising, drugs such as MDMA have the potential for negative effects that are counter productive in a therapy setting. For example, MDMA may make negative cognition worse. This means that a positive experience is not a guarantee and can be contingent on aspects like the setting and the patient's expectations. Additionally there is no clear model of the psychopharmacological means for a positive or negative experience. There is also a potential concern for the neurotoxic effects of MDMA on the fiber density of serotonin neurons in the neocortex. High doses of MDMA may cause potential depletion of serotonergic axons. The same effects may not be caused by lower doses of MDMA required for treatment, however.

MDMA-assisted psychotherapy (MDMA-AT) is in late-stage clinical trials to treat PTSD as of 2025.

=== Doses and durations ===
Oral doses and durations of entactogens^{a}
Compound	Class	Dose	Duration
MDA (Sally, Sassafras)	Amphetamine	80–160 mg (20–200 mg+)	4–8 hours
(S)-MDA	Amphetamine	160–225 mg	3 hours
(R)-MDA	Amphetamine	70–200 mg	4–8 hours
MDMA (Ecstasy; Molly; Adam)	Amphetamine	80–150 mg (25–200 mg+)	3–6 hours
(S)-MDMA	Amphetamine	60–125 mg	5 hours
(R)-MDMA	Amphetamine	250–300 mg	4–5 hours
MDEA (MDE; Eve)	Amphetamine	100–200 mg (30–225 mg+)	3–5 hours
MDOH (MDHA)	Amphetamine	100–160 mg	3–6 hours
FLEA (MDMOH, MDHMA)	Amphetamine	100–160 mg	4–8 hours
Lys-MDA	Amphetamine	~164 mg	~6 hours
MMDA (5-methoxy-MDA)	Amphetamine	100–250 mg	"Moderate"
BDB (J)	Phenylisobutylamine	150–230 mg	4–8 hours
MBDB (methyl-J; Eden)	Phenylisobutylamine	180–210 mg (150–250 mg+)	4–6 hours
Methylone (βk-MDMA)	Cathinone	100–250 mg (60–325 mg+)	2–5 hours
Ethylone (βk-MDEA)	Cathinone	150–250 mg (80–400 mg)	2–6 hours
Butylone (βk-MBDB)	Cathinone	100–250 mg (20–250 mg)	2–5 hours
Mephedrone (4-MMC)	Cathinone	100–200 mg (15–300 mg+)	2–5 hours
5-APB	Benzofuran	60–80 mg (20–100 mg+)	3–8 hours
5-MAPB	Benzofuran	30–70 mg	5–6 hours
6-APB	Benzofuran	80–100 mg (15–125 mg+)	6–9 hours
6-MAPB	Benzofuran	50–100 mg	6–8 hours
5-APDB	Dihydrobenzofuran	50–200 mg+	Unknown
5-MAPDB	Dihydrobenzofuran	50–150 mg+	Unknown
6-APDB	Dihydrobenzofuran	20–130 mg+	Unknown
MDAI	2-Aminoindane	100–200 mg (20–300 mg+)	2–5 hours
MMAI	2-Aminoindane	Unknown	Unknown
MEAI (5-MeO-AI)	2-Aminoindane	100–250 mg	Unknown
5-IAI	2-Aminoindane	100–200 mg	2–4 hours
AMT	Tryptamine	15–30 mg	12–16 hours
AET	Tryptamine	100–150 mg	6–8 hours
BK-NM-AMT (βk-NM-AMT)	Tryptamine	Unknown	Unknown
Borax combo^{b}	Multiple^{b}	Variable	Variable
Footnotes: ^{a} = Some of these drugs also act as robust psychedelics and/or stimulants. Examples of psychedelics include MDA, MMDA, and AMT, while examples of stimulants include mephedrone. ^{b} = The Borax combo is a combination of 5-MAPB or MDAI, 2-FMA, and 5-MeO-MiPT or 4-HO-MET and is said to closely mimic the effects and unique "magic" of MDMA. Refs: Individual:

The above table does not include atypical agents with some reported entactogen-like effects, such as the phenethylamine serotonergic psychedelic 2C-B and the atypical tryptamine serotonergic psychedelics 5-MeO-DiPT and 5-MeO-MiPT.

== Effects ==
Both terms adopted and used in naming the class of therapeutic drugs for MDMA and related compounds were chosen with the intention of providing some reflection of the reported psychological effects associated with drugs in the classification and distinguishing these compounds from classical psychedelic drugs such as LSD, mescaline, and psilocybin and major stimulants, such as methamphetamine and amphetamine. Chemically, MDMA is classified as a substituted amphetamine (which includes stimulants like dextroamphetamine and psychedelics like 2,5-dimethoxy-4-methylamphetamine), which makes MDMA a substituted phenethylamine (which includes other stimulants like methylphenidate and other psychedelics like mescaline) by the definition of amphetamine. While chemically related both to psychedelics and stimulants, the psychological effects experienced with MDMA were reported to provide obvious and striking aspects of personal relatedness, feelings of connectedness, communion with others, and ability to feel what others feel—in short an empathic resonance is consistently evoked. While psychedelics like LSD may sometimes yield effects of empathic resonance, these effects tend to be momentary and likely passed over on the way to some other dimension or interest. In contrast, the main characteristic that distinguishes MDMA from LSD-type experiences is the consistency of the effects of emotional communion, relatedness, emotional openness—in short, empathy and sympathy.

== Side effects ==
Side effects of entactogens like MDMA include mydriasis, nystagmus, jaw clenching, bruxism, insomnia, appetite loss, tachycardia, hypertension, and hyperthermia, among others. Severe adverse effects of entactogens like MDMA can include dehydration, hyperthermia, seizures, rhabdomyolysis, disseminated intravascular coagulation, hyponatremia, acute renal failure, liver injury, serotonin syndrome, and valvular heart disease. Entactogens can produce long-lasting serotonergic neurotoxicity and associated cognitive and memory deficits as well as psychiatric changes.

== Overdose ==
Entactogens like MDMA show a much narrower margin of safety and greater toxicity in overdose than serotonergic psychedelics. Whereas LSD and psilocybin have extrapolated human lethal doses relative to typical recreational doses of approximately 1,000-fold and 200-fold, respectively, a reasonable estimated fatal dose of MDMA is only about 15 or 16 times a single typical recreational dose.

== Interactions ==
Entactogens like MDMA pose high risks of severe and potentially fatal serotonin syndrome and hypertensive crisis in people on monoamine oxidase inhibitors (MAOIs) due to synergistic elevations of monoamines like serotonin and norepinephrine. MDMA also has the potential to interact with various other drugs.

== Pharmacology ==
=== Mechanism of action ===
Entactogens like MDMA are serotonin releasing agents and hence are indirect agonists of serotonin receptors. They produce entactogenic effects in animals such as increased prosocial behavior like adjacent lying, enhanced empathy-like behavior, and antiaggressive effects. Likewise, MDMA increases sociability, prosociality, and emotional empathy in humans.

In animals, MDMA induced prosocial behavior and elevations in circulating oxytocin levels and these effects were abolished by pretreatment with the serotonin 5-HT_{1A} receptor antagonist WAY-100635. Conversely, the serotonin 5-HT_{1A} receptor agonist 8-OH-DPAT produced prosocial behavior and increased oxytocin levels similarly to MDMA. In addition, MDMA has been shown to activate oxytocinergic neurons in the hypothalamus and this too is reversed by serotonin 5-HT_{1A} receptor antagonism. Subsequent research found that direct injection of the serotonin 5-HT_{1A} receptor WAY-100635 locally into the basolateral amygdala (BLA) suppressed MDMA-induced prosocial behavior and that direct injection of MDMA locally into the BLA significantly increased sociability.

The serotonin 5-HT_{2B} and 5-HT_{2C} receptor antagonist SB-206553 has also been found to block MDMA-induced prosocial behavior, although it produced potentially confounding thigmotaxis (hyperactivity at periphery of testing chamber) as well. Conversely, the serotonin 5-HT_{1B} receptor antagonist GR-55562 and the serotonin 5-HT_{2A} receptor antagonist ketanserin were both ineffective. Likewise, another study found that selective antagonists of the serotonin 5-HT_{1B}, 5-HT_{2A}, 5-HT_{2C}, and 5-HT_{4} receptors (SB-216641), volinanserin (MDL-100907), SB-242084, and SB-204070, respectively) were all ineffective in suppressing MDMA-induced prosocial activity. Other research has found that serotonin 5-HT_{2B} receptor inactivation abolishes the serotonin release induced by MDMA and attenuates many of its effects. In addition to the preceding findings, induction of serotonin release by MDMA in the nucleus accumbens and consequent activation of serotonin 5-HT_{1B} receptors in this area is implicated in its enhancement of prosocial behaviors, whereas consequent activation of yet-to-be-determined serotonin receptors in this area is implicated in its enhancement of empathy-like behaviors. Injection of the serotonin 5-HT_{1B} receptor antagonist NAS-181 directly into the nucleus accumbens blocked the prosocial behaviors of MDMA.

On the basis of the serotonin 5-HT_{1A} receptor-mediated oxytocin release with MDMA, it has been proposed that increased oxytocinergic signaling may mediate the prosocial effects of MDMA in animals. Accordingly, intracerebroventricular injection of the peptide oxytocin receptor antagonist tocinoic acid blocked MDMA- and 8-OH-DPAT-induced prosocial effects. However, in a subsequent study, systemically administered C25, a non-peptide oxytocin receptor antagonist, failed to affect MDMA-induced prosocial behavior, whereas the vasopressin V_{1A} receptor antagonist relcovaptan (SR-49059) was able to block MDMA-induced prosocial activity. It might be that tocinoic acid is non-selective and also blocks the vasopressin V_{1A} receptor or that C25 is peripherally selective and is unable to block oxytocin receptors in the brain. More research is needed to clarify this. In any case, in another study, the non-peptide and centrally active selective oxytocin receptor antagonist L-368899 abolished MDMA-induced prosocial behavior. Conversely, in other studies, different oxytocin receptor antagonists were ineffective.

As in animals, MDMA greatly increases circulating oxytocin levels in humans. Serotonin reuptake inhibitors and norepinephrine reuptake inhibitors reduced the subjective effects of MDMA in humans, for instance increased extroversion, self-confidence, closeness, openness, and talkativeness. The 5-HT_{2A} receptor antagonist ketanserin reduced MDMA-induced increases in friendliness. MDMA-induced emotional empathy was not affected by the serotonin 5-HT_{1A} receptor antagonist pindolol or by intranasal oxytocin. Similarly, MDMA-induced emotional empathy and prosocial behavior have not been associated with circulating oxytocin levels. As such, the role of oxytocin in the entactogenic effects of MDMA in humans has been controversial. However, it has subsequently been found that in people with oxytocin deficiency due to arginine vasopressin deficiency, MDMA fails to elevate oxytocin levels and shows markedly blunted entactogenic effects, including diminished effects like euphoria, enhanced empathy, and reduced anxiety, supporting a key role of oxytocin in its effects.

Other serotonin releasing agents, like fenfluramine, show prosocial effects in animals similar to those of MDMA. Fenfluramine has likewise been reported to improve social deficits in children with autism. Selective agonists of the serotonin 5-HT_{1A} and 5-HT_{1B} receptors and of the oxytocin receptors have been or are being investigated for the potential treatment of social deficits and aggression. Examples include batoprazine, eltoprazine (DU-28853), fluprazine (DU-27716), F-15,599 (NLX-01), zolmitriptan (ML-004), and LIT-001. Serotonergic psychedelics, for instance lysergic acid diethylamide (LSD) and psilocybin, which act as non-selective serotonin receptor agonists including of the serotonin 5-HT_{1} and 5-HT_{2} receptors, have shown prosocial and empathy-enhancing effects in animals and/or humans as well, both acutely and long-term.

The serotonin release of MDMA appears to be the key pharmacological action mediating the entactogenic, prosocial, and empathy-enhancing effects of the drug. However, in addition to serotonin release, MDMA is also a potent releasing agent of norepinephrine and dopamine, and hence acts as a well-balanced serotonin–norepinephrine–dopamine releasing agent. Additionally, MDMA is a direct agonist of several serotonin receptors, including of the serotonin 5-HT_{2} receptors, with moderate affinity. These actions are thought to play an important role in the effects of MDMA, including in its psychostimulant, euphoriant, and mild psychedelic effects, as well as in its unique and difficult-to-replicate "magic". It has been said by Matthew Baggott that few to no MDMA analogues, including MBDB, methylone, 6-APDB, 5-APDB, 6-APB, 5-APB, MDAT, and MDAI among others, reproduce the full quality and "magic" of MDMA. Exceptions may anecdotally include 5-MAPB, particularly in specific enantiomer ratios, and the Borax combo. The unique properties of MDMA are believed to be dependent on a very specific mixture and ratio of pharmacological activities, including combined serotonin, norepinephrine, and dopamine release and direct serotonin receptor agonism.

Some entactogens, such as the benzofurans 5-MAPB, 6-MAPB, BK-5-MAPB, and BK-6-MAPB, have unexpectedly been found to be potent serotonin 5-HT_{1B} receptor agonists. In addition to serotonin release and other actions, this property may be involved in their entactogenic effects. Conversely, MDMA is much less potent as an agonist of the serotonin 5-HT_{1B} receptor.

Ariadne, the α-ethyl analogue of the serotonergic psychedelic DOM, fully substitutes for MDMA in rodent drug discrimination tests, suggesting that it may have entactogen-like effects. This property is unusual among psychedelics, and is in notable contrast to DOM, which at best partially substitutes for MDMA. Besides Ariadne, the NBOMe drugs such as 25I-NBOMe and 25B-NBOMe also partially to fully substitute for MDMA in rodents. Unlike conventional entactogens, Ariadne shows no activity at the monoamine transporters, and instead acts as a selective serotonin 5-HT_{2} receptor partial agonist, including as a lower-efficacy agonist of the serotonin 5-HT_{2A} receptor. Certain other psychedelics and related compounds, like low doses of 2C-B, are also selective serotonin 5-HT_{2} receptor partial agonists that have likewise been implicated as having entactogenic effects. MDMA itself is notable in being a lower-efficacy partial agonist of the serotonin 5-HT_{2A} receptor as well. The stimulus effects of MDMA in the drug discrimination paradigm are partially blocked by the selective serotonin 5-HT_{2A} receptor antagonist volinanserin in rodents. Similarly, the psychoactive effects of MDMA are partially blocked by the relatively selective serotonin 5-HT_{2A} receptor antagonist ketanserin in humans.

== Chemistry ==
Entactogens belong to a few chemical families, including phenethylamines or amphetamines, cyclized phenethylamines, and tryptamines. Phenethylamine entactogens can be divided into methylenedioxyphenethylamines (MDxx) like MDA and MDMA, benzofurans like 5-APB and 6-APB, and dihydrobenzofurans like 5-APDB and 6-APDB. They can also be further divided into additional subgroups such as cathinones like methylone BK-5-MAPB and phenylisobutylamines like MBDB. Cyclized phenethylamine entactogens include 2-aminoindanes like MDAI and 2-aminotetralins like MDAT. Tryptamine entactogens are α-alkyltryptamines and include α-methyltryptamine (AMT) and α-ethyltryptamine (AET) as well as β-keto-α-alkyltryptamines like BK-NM-AMT. Other possible structural families also exist, such as benzothiophenes and other bioisosteres like ODMA, TDMA, and SeDMA.

Chemical structures of entactogens of different structural families
MDA (MDxx)

MDMA (MDxx)

5-APB (benzofuran)

6-APB (benzofuran)

5-APDB (dihydrobenzofuran)

6-APDB (dihydrobenzofuran)

Methylone (cathinone)

MBDB (phenylisobutylamine)

MDAI (2-aminoindane)

MDAT (2-aminotetralin)

α-Ethyltryptamine (tryptamine)

BK-NM-AMT (β-keto-tryptamine)

== History ==
The history of MDMA and other entactogens has been reviewed.

== Society and culture ==
=== Etymology ===
The term empathogen, meaning "generating a state of empathy", was coined by Ralph Metzner in 1983 as a term to denote a class of drugs that includes MDMA and other agents with similar effects. Subsequently, in 1986, Nichols introduced the term entactogen, meaning "producing a touching within", to denote this class of drugs, asserting a concern with the potential for improper association of the term empathogen with negative connotations related to the Greek root πάθος páthos ("suffering; passion"). Additionally, Nichols wanted to avoid any association with the term pathogenesis.

Nichols also thought the original term was limiting, and did not cover other therapeutic uses for the drugs that go beyond instilling feelings of empathy. The hybrid word entactogen is derived from the roots en (Greek: within), tactus (Latin: touch) and -gen (Greek: produce). Entactogen is not becoming dominant in usage, and, despite their difference in connotation, they are essentially interchangeable, as they refer to precisely the same chemicals.

In 2024, an additional alternative term, connectogen, was proposed and introduced by Kurt Stocker and Matthias Liechti.

== See also ==
- List of entactogens
- List of investigational hallucinogens and entactogens
- Serenic (antiaggressive drug)
