= Norepinephrine releasing agent =

Catecholaminergic type of drug

Ephedrine, one of the most well-known selective NRAs.

A norepinephrine releasing agent (NRA), also known as an adrenergic releasing agent, is a catecholaminergic type of drug that induces the release of norepinephrine (noradrenaline) and epinephrine (adrenaline) from the pre-synaptic neuron into the synapse. This in turn leads to increased extracellular concentrations of norepinephrine and epinephrine and therefore an increase in adrenergic neurotransmission.

A closely related type of drug is a norepinephrine reuptake inhibitor (NRI), for instance reboxetine. Another class of drugs that stimulates adrenergic activity is the adrenergic receptor agonist class.

== Uses and examples ==
NRAs, frequently as norepinephrine–dopamine releasing agents (NDRAs) rather than as selective NRAs, are used for a variety of clinical indications including the following:

- For the treatment of attention deficit hyperactivity disorder (ADHD) — e.g., amphetamine, dextroamphetamine, levoamphetamine, lisdexamfetamine, methamphetamine
- As anorectics in the treatment of obesity and binge-eating disorder — e.g., amphetamine, lisdexamfetamine, phentermine, benzphetamine, phenmetrazine, aminorex
- As wakefulness-promoting agents in the treatment of narcolepsy — e.g., amphetamine, methamphetamine
- As nasal decongestants and bronchodilators — e.g., levomethamphetamine, propylhexedrine, ephedrine, pseudoephedrine, phenylpropanolamine
- Miscellaneous – e.g., amantadine

They are also used as recreational drugs, though this is typically reserved only for those that also induce the release of dopamine and/or serotonin, for instance amphetamine, methamphetamine, MDMA, mephedrone, 4-methylaminorex, and MDAI, among others.

Cathine and cathinone are NRAs found naturally in Catha edulis. Ephedrine and pseudoephedrine are also found naturally in Ephedra sinica. Both of these plants are used medicinally (and recreationally as well regarding the former). The endogenous trace amines phenethylamine and tyramine are NRAs found in many animals, including humans.

Selective NRAs include ephedrine, pseudoephedrine, phenylpropanolamine, levomethamphetamine, and D-phenylalaninol. These drugs also release dopamine to a much lesser extent however (e.g., ~10- to 20-fold less potently). No highly selective NRAs are currently known. Among the most selective known NRAs is ephedrine, which had about 19-fold higher potency for inducing norepinephrine release over dopamine release in one study. Levomethamphetamine has shown about 15-fold higher potency in inducing norepinephrine release over dopamine release. D-Phenylalaninol has 13-fold higher potency in inducing norepinephrine release over dopamine release. In contrast to levomethamphetamine, levoamphetamine is an NDRA, with only about 3-fold preference for inducing norepinephrine release over dopamine release in one study (versus dextroamphetamine being roughly equipotent on norepinephrine and dopamine release in the same study). NRAs play a significant role in treating ADHD, obesity, narcolepsy, and as sympathomimetics by enhancing adrenergic signaling.

== See also ==
- Monoamine releasing agent
- Serotonin releasing agent
- Dopamine releasing agent
- Serotonin–norepinephrine releasing agent
- Norepinephrine–dopamine releasing agent
- Serotonin–norepinephrine–dopamine releasing agent
