= Drug discrimination =

Behavioral test comparing drugs

Drug discrimination (DD) is a technique in behavioral neuroscience used to evaluate the discriminative stimulus properties or interoceptive cues of psychoactive drugs. In drug discrimination, a subject is trained on a training drug, and then it is tested with novel drugs to see if the novel drugs are experienced as similar to the training drug. In essence, the drug discrimination paradigm has the subject "tell" the experimenter "I think you gave me the training drug" or "I don't think you gave me anything".

The discriminative stimulus properties of drugs are believed to reflect their subjective effects. When partial or full stimulus generalization of a test drug to a training drug occurs, the test drug can be assumed to have effects that are subjectively similar to those of the training drug. Drug discrimination tests are usually performed in rodents, but have also been conducted in non-human primates and humans.

Drug discrimination assays have been employed to assess whether drugs have stimulant-, hallucinogen- or entactogen-like effects, among many other varieties of drug effects. The exact neural basis leading to an animal's interoceptive response is unknown and is likely to vary depending on the drug class.

== Serotonergic psychedelics ==
Drug discrimination was first used with psychedelic drugs in 1971. This was with rats, whereas the first use of drug discrimination with psychedelics in mice was published in 2003.

The area of the brain where the discriminative stimulus properties of LSD and presumably other serotonergic psychedelics in rats is mediated has been identified as the anterior cingulate cortex (ACC). Local infusions of LSD into the ACC dose-dependently and up to fully substituted for systemically administered LSD and this substitution could be completely blocked by the highly selective serotonin 5-HT_{2A} receptor antagonist volinanserin (M100907). In another study however, microinjection of LSD into the nucleus accumbens also produced its discriminative stimulus effects. Although serotonin 5-HT_{2A} receptor agonism is accepted as the mechanism mediating the hallucinogenic effects of psychedelics, other receptors, including the serotonin 5-HT_{1A} receptor, the serotonin 5-HT_{2C} receptor, and the serotonin 5-HT_{5A} receptor, also variably contribute to their discriminative stimulus properties and may be involved in their subjective effects. The dopamine D_{4} receptor is involved in the discriminative stimulus properties of LSD as well.

The serotonin 5-HT_{1A} receptor is involved in the discriminative stimulus properties of 5-MeO-DMT and LSD in rodents but not in those of psilocybin or DOM. The 5-MeO-DMT stimulus is mediated primarily by the serotonin 5-HT_{1A} receptor and partially by the serotonin 5-HT_{2A} receptor. The serotonin 5-HT_{2C} receptor is importantly involved in the discriminative stimulus properties of DiPT in rodents but not in those of dimethyltryptamine (DMT). A serotonin 5-HT_{2C} receptor antagonist had only modest effects on the discriminative stimulus properties of psilocybin, suggesting against an important involvement of this receptor in psilocybin's subjective effects.

Certain psychedelics and related drugs, like LSD, 25B-NBOMe, and Ariadne, fully substitute for the entactogen MDMA in rodents, whereas others, like DOM, DMT, and 25I-NBOMe, at most partially substitute for MDMA.

Lisuride partially to fully substitutes for LSD and other psychedelics in drug discrimination tests in rodents and monkeys. Lisuride is generally thought to be non-hallucinogenic in humans and hence this has been regarded as a false positive for drug discrimination. However, when a modified drug discrimination paradigm is employed in which animals are trained to discriminate two training drugs (lisuride and LSD) and vehicle, lisuride no longer substitutes for LSD. As such, this false positive can be overcome. Another notable false positive is yohimbine, which fully substituted for LSD yet is not a serotonin 5-HT_{2A} receptor agonist. Yohimbine similarly produces the head-twitch response in rodents.

Species differences, for instance between rats and mice, have been apparent in studies of drug discrimination with psychedelics. For example, DOI was several times more potent in rats than in mice. In addition, the discriminative stimulus properties of DOI in rats appear to be solely mediated by the serotonin 5-HT_{2A} receptor, whereas the DOI stimulus in mice is also partially mediated by the serotonin 5-HT_{2A} receptor. Similarly, the LSD stimulus appears to be solely mediated by the serotonin 5-HT_{2A} receptor in rats, whereas mice also have a significant 5-HT_{1A} receptor-mediated component.

In monkeys, the discriminative stimulus effects of DOM, dipropyltryptamine (DPT), and 2C-T-7 are all predominantly if not exclusively mediated by serotonin 5-HT_{2A} receptor activation.

== See also ==
- Head-twitch response
