= Dihydroxytryptamine =

Dihydroxytryptamine (DHT) may refer to:

- 4,5-Dihydroxytryptamine (4,5-DHT)
- 5,6-Dihydroxytryptamine (5,6-DHT)
- 5,7-Dihydroxytryptamine (5,7-DHT)
- 6,7-Dihydroxytryptamine (6,7-DHT)

== See also ==
- 4-Hydroxy-5-methoxytryptamine (4-HO-5-MeO-T)
- Psilomethoxin (4-HO-5-MeO-N,N-DMT)
