= C10H12N2O2 =

The molecular formula C_{10}H_{12}N_{2}O_{2} (molar mass: 192.21 g/mol) may refer to:

- 4,5-Dihydroxytryptamine
- 5,6-Dihydroxytryptamine
- 5,7-Dihydroxytryptamine
- 6,7-Dihydroxytryptamine
