= Church of the Sacred Synthesis =

American psychedelic church

- Formation: November 2021; 5 years ago
- Founders: Greg Lake; Ian Benouis
- Type: Psychedelic church
- Location: Austin, Texas
- Website: thesacredsynthesis.com
- Formerly called: Church of Psilomethoxin

The Church of the Sacred Synthesis, also formerly known as the Church of Psilomethoxin, is a psychedelic church based in Austin, Texas. However, it operates nationwide and has been described as a so-called "mail-order mushroom church".

The church's sacrament is cultivated psilocybin mushrooms with substrate enriched with 5-MeO-DMT, which they claim results in the artificial biosynthesis of a novel psychedelic drug known as psilomethoxin (5-methoxypsilocin or 4-HO-5-MeO-DMT), as well as psilomethoxin's putative prodrug 5-methoxypsilocybin (4-PO-5-MeO-DMT). In addition, the church claims that psilomethoxin has effects that are a blend of or intermediate between those of 5-MeO-DMT and psilocybin, for instance having reduced psychedelic visuals compared to psilocybin. The church says that these ideas were inspired by a 2005 article on the topic by the psychedelic chemist Alexander Shulgin, who referenced the work of the German mycologist and chemist Jochen Gartz.

Contradicting the church's claims however, a 2023 chemical analysis preprint by Samuel Williamson and Alexander Sherwood of the Usona Institute detected no psilomethoxin and instead only psilocybin, psilocin, and baeocystin in their mushrooms, suggesting that its sacrament is simply normal psilocybin-containing mushrooms. The church's own initially undisclosed analyses also failed to detect psilomethoxin. Similarly, Hamilton Morris failed to detect psilomethoxin, but found psilocin and on another occasion only ketamine, suggesting that the church may have mishandled the sacrament. The church has contested the methodology of the analyses and has said that they take the presence of psilomethoxin in the mushrooms based on faith and their personal experiences with it. Critics have dismissed said experiences as being due to the placebo effect. As a result of the preceding findings, the church is highly controversial and has been referred to as a "scam" and its founders as "charlatans". According to psychedelic chemist David E. Nichols, "The church has a completely nonsensical and nonscientific position". Others such as Andrew Gallimore, Zeus Tipado, and Psymposia have also criticized the church. In addition, certain tryptamines with chemical structures similar to that of psilomethoxin such as 4,5-dihydroxytryptamine (4,5-DHT) and 4-hydroxy-5-methoxytryptamine (4-HO-5-MeO-T) have been found to cause serotonergic neurotoxicity, which has raised separate concerns.

The Church of the Sacred Synthesis was founded by the attorneys Greg Lake and Ian Benouis in November 2021. Originally set up as a non-profit, the church launched a for-profit arm called PsiloSynth in January 2023. The church has trademarked the term "psilomethoxin". It experienced a wave of media attention in April 2023 due to its claims of using psilomethoxin as a novel psychedelic drug being contradicted. The church renamed itself from the Church of Psilomethoxin to the Church of the Sacred Synthesis in 2023 following this controversy and criticism. By mid-2023, the church had more than 1,750 members. It was said to send out 20 to 40 orders per day and was making $125,000 per month in sales and donations. However, the church soon lost 80% of its monthly revenue following the controversy.

In March 2024, the church announced that they had successfully isolated and identified psilomethoxin in their sacrament with new analyses. In addition, they sued several of their previous critics for defamation. These critics included the Usona Institute, the Promega Corporation (Bill Linton being the co-founder of both Usona and Promega), Psymposia, and an X (Twitter) user, among others. However, Gallimore and others disputed the church's new analytic methodology and dismissed their findings as "meaningless", noting that no quantitative data had been released and the results were not definitive. Later that year, all of the church's legal claims were dismissed in court. In May 2026, the church announced further positive analytic results and initiated new lawsuits, including against the Usona Institute and Hamilton Morris.

== See also ==
- Psychedelic church
- Ledgeway Sangha (another psychedelic church in Austin, Texas)
