= HPTP =

Monoaminergic neurotoxin

Clinical data
- Drug class: Serotonergic and dopaminergic neurotoxin

Identifiers
- IUPAC name: 4-[4-(4-chlorophenyl)-3,6-dihydro-2H-pyridin-1-yl]-1-(4-fluorophenyl)butan-1-one
- CAS Number: 52669-92-8
- PubChem CID: 171187
- ChemSpider: 149659
- ChEBI: CHEBI:177523
- ChEMBL: ChEMBL3544895
- CompTox Dashboard (EPA): DTXSID80200642

Chemical and physical data
- Formula: C_{21}H_{21}ClFNO
- Molar mass: 357.85 g·mol^{−1}
- 3D model (JSmol): Interactive image
- SMILES: C1CN(CC=C1C2=CC=C(C=C2)Cl)CCCC(=O)C3=CC=C(C=C3)F
- InChI: InChI=1S/C21H21ClFNO/c22-19-7-3-16(4-8-19)17-11-14-24(15-12-17)13-1-2-21(25)18-5-9-20(23)10-6-18/h3-11H,1-2,12-15H2; Key:ZNOLNAPJKOYTHY-UHFFFAOYSA-N

HPTP is a monoaminergic neurotoxin related to MPTP. It is the dehydration product of haloperidol. The agent is specifically a dopaminergic and serotonergic neurotoxin. HPTP is a prodrug of HPP^{+}, which mediates its monoaminergic neurotoxicity. This is analogous to how MPP^{+} mediates the neurotoxicity of MPTP. Other related compounds include RHPTP and RHPP^{+}.
