= C13H19N2O4P =

The molecular formula C_{13}H_{19}N_{2}O_{4}P (molar mass: 298.279 g/mol) may refer to:

- 5-Methylpsilocybin
- Aeruginascin
- N-Phosphonooxymethyl-DMT
