= C12H18ClN =

The molecular formula C_{12}H_{18}ClN may refer to:

- Mefenorex
- Xylamine
