= C8H12N2O2 =

The molecular formula C_{8}H_{12}N_{2}O_{2} (molar mass: 168.193 g/mol) may refer to:

- Hexamethylene diisocyanate
- 4-PIOL
- Pyridoxamine
- 6-Aminodopamine
