= CDNF =

CDNF may refer to:

- Canonical disjunctive normal form, a form of expression in Boolean algebra
- Cerebral dopamine neurotrophic factor, a protein encoded by the CDNF gene
