= 5-Methoxypsilocybin =

Clinical data
- Other names: 5-MeO-psilocybin; 5-Methoxy-4-phosphoryloxy-N,N-dimethyltryptamine; 5-MeO-4-PO-DMT; Psilomethoxybin

Identifiers
- IUPAC name: 3-[2-(dimethylamino)ethyl]-5-methoxy-1H-indol-4-yl dihydrogen phosphate

Chemical and physical data
- Formula: C_{13}H_{19}N_{2}O_{5}P
- Molar mass: 314.278 g·mol^{−1}
- 3D model (JSmol): Interactive image
- SMILES: COc1ccc2c(c1OP(=O)(O)O)c(CCN(C)C)c[nH]2
- InChI: InChI=1S/C13H19N2O5P/c1-15(2)7-6-9-8-14-10-4-5-11(19-3)13(12(9)10)20-21(16,17)18/h4-5,8,14H,6-7H2,1-3H3,(H2,16,17,18); Key:SLAJUARCDKZWMH-UHFFFAOYSA-N

5-Methoxypsilocybin, also known as 5-MeO-psilocybin or as 5-methoxy-4-phosphoryloxy-N,N-dimethyltryptamine (5-MeO-4-PO-DMT), is a compound of the tryptamine family which has been speculated may have psychedelic effects. It is related to psilocybin (4-PO-DMT) and 5-MeO-DMT and in terms of chemical structure and can be thought of as a combination of the structural features of the two compounds. 5-Methoxypsilocybin would be anticipated to possibly act as a prodrug of psilomethoxin (5-methoxypsilocin) similarly to how psilocybin acts as a prodrug of psilocin.

The Church of Sacred Synthesis (formerly the Church of Psilomethoxin) claims that psilomethoxin is present in the 5-MeO-DMT-fed psilocybin mushrooms that they refer to as their sacrament and sell online. Along with psilomethoxin, 5-methoxypsilocybin may also be expected to be present in the mushrooms if their claims are true. However, a 2023 independent chemical analysis detected neither psilomethoxin nor 5-methoxypsilocybin in the church's mushrooms, but instead found the usual components of psilocybin mushrooms such as psilocybin, baeocystin, and psilocin.

== See also ==
- Substituted tryptamine
- 4-Hydroxy-5-methoxytryptamine (4-HO-5-MeO-T)
- 5-Methylpsilocybin
