= C11H12N2O3 =

The molecular formula C_{11}H_{12}N_{2}O_{3} (molar mass: 220.23 g/mol, exact mass: 220.0848 u) may refer to:

- 5-Hydroxytryptophan
- 7-Hydroxytryptophan
- MDMAR
