= 1-Trichloromethyl-1,2,3,4-tetrahydro-β-carboline =

Clinical data
- Other names: TaClo; 1-Trichloromethyl-THβC; 1-TCMTC
- ATC code: None

Identifiers
- IUPAC name: 1-(trichloromethyl)-2,3,4,9-tetrahydro-1H-pyrido[3,4-b]indole
- CAS Number: 6649-90-7 131384-80-0
- PubChem CID: 119183
- ChemSpider: 106473
- CompTox Dashboard (EPA): DTXSID70897166

Chemical and physical data
- Formula: C_{12}H_{11}Cl_{3}N_{2}
- Molar mass: 289.58 g·mol^{−1}
- 3D model (JSmol): Interactive image
- SMILES: C1CNC(C2=C1C3=CC=CC=C3N2)C(Cl)(Cl)Cl
- InChI: InChI=1S/C12H11Cl3N2/c13-12(14,15)11-10-8(5-6-16-11)7-3-1-2-4-9(7)17-10/h1-4,11,16-17H,5-6H2; Key:DPPAKKMPHBZNQA-UHFFFAOYSA-N

1-Trichloromethyl-1,2,3,4-tetrahydro-β-carboline (1-TCMTC), also known as tryptamine–chloral (TaClo), is a mammalian alkaloid and potent dopaminergic neurotoxin of the β-carboline family. It can form spontaneously in vivo as a condensation product of endogenous tryptamine (Ta) with chloral hydrate (Clo) or trichloroethylene. The drug shows structural similarity to MPTP. As with MPTP, it acts as an inhibitor of mitochondrial complex I, but shows greater potency in comparison.

TaClo has been found to acutely elevate levels of serotonin and possibly dopamine in the brain in rodents, and elevated serotonin levels may be involved in its dopaminergic neurotoxicity. It exclusively enters serotonergic neurons via passive diffusion rather than by the serotonin transporter (SERT). TaClo produces long-lasting behavioral changes in rodents, such as parkinsonism, changes in locomotor activity, and altered sensitivity to dopaminergic drugs. While initially characterized as a dopaminergic neurotoxin, TaClo has since been reported to be non-selective, acting as a general strong cytotoxin and without specificity for dopaminergic neurons nor for neurons generally.

The chemical synthesis of TaClo has been described. The N-methyl derivative of TaClo, N-methyl-TaClo, is a more potent dopaminergic neurotoxin than TaClo. Another analogue, TaBro, is also more potent. Other analogues have been described as well.

TaClo was first described in the scientific literature in 1990. It was subsequently described as a neurotoxin in 1995. The compound may be an endogenous or environmental neurotoxin and might be involved in the development of Parkinson's disease in some people.

== See also ==
- Substituted β-carboline
- Monoamine neurotoxin
