= HPP+ =

Monoaminergic neurotoxin related to MPTP and metabolites of haloperidol

HPP^{+}

Clinical data
- Other names: Haloperidol pyridinium; Haloperidol pyridinium ion; Haloperidol pyridinium cation; BCPP^{+}; 4-CFOBP; 4-(4-Chlorophenyl)-1-(4-(4-fluorophenyl)-4-oxobutyl)pyridinium
- Drug class: Monoaminergic neurotoxin
- ATC code: None

Identifiers
- IUPAC name: 4-[4-(4-chlorophenyl)pyridin-1-ium-1-yl]-1-(4-fluorophenyl)butan-1-one
- CAS Number: 125785-69-5
- PubChem CID: 9975463
- DrugBank: DBMET01212
- ChemSpider: 8151055
- UNII: 47Z7A2W953
- ChEBI: CHEBI:178132
- ChEMBL: ChEMBL1269
- CompTox Dashboard (EPA): DTXSID00154895

Chemical and physical data
- Formula: C_{21}H_{18}ClFNO^{+}
- Molar mass: 354.83 g·mol^{−1}
- 3D model (JSmol): Interactive image
- SMILES: C1=CC(=CC=C1C2=CC=[N+](C=C2)CCCC(=O)C3=CC=C(C=C3)F)Cl
- InChI: InChI=1S/C21H18ClFNO/c22-19-7-3-16(4-8-19)17-11-14-24(15-12-17)13-1-2-21(25)18-5-9-20(23)10-6-18/h3-12,14-15H,1-2,13H2/q+1; Key:KAPIKUHBALFONG-UHFFFAOYSA-N

HPP^{+}, also known as haloperidol pyridinium, is a monoaminergic neurotoxin and a metabolite of haloperidol.

== Formation and metabolism ==
HPP^{+} is formed from haloperidol, and its dehydration product HPTP, by CYP3A enzymes in the liver. The compound can cross the blood–brain barrier and has been detected in the brain following haloperidol administration in both animals and humans.

== Neurotoxicity ==
HPP^{+} is structurally related to the selective dopaminergic neurotoxin MPTP (and its active metabolite MPP^{+}), which induces Parkinson's disease-like symptoms in humans. HPP^{+} is a neurotoxin specifically affecting serotonergic and dopaminergic neurons, and its neurotoxicity resembles that of MPTP.

== Extrapyramidal symptoms ==
HPP^{+} may contribute to the development of extrapyramidal symptoms (EPS) in patients undergoing long-term haloperidol therapy. An alternative theory posits that these symptoms result from long-term dopamine receptor supersensitivity, rather than direct neurotoxicity.

== Discovery ==
HPP^{+} was first identified as a neurotoxic metabolite of haloperidol in 1990 and 1991, many years after haloperidol was introduced clinically and following the discovery of MPTP.

== Additional metabolites ==
Besides HPP^{+}, another reactive metabolite of haloperidol, RHPP^{+}, has been detected in humans. The parent form of RHPP^{+} is RHPTP.

== HPP^{+} in clinical studies of haloperidol ==
No relationships were found for serum concentrations of HPP^{+} or the ratio of serum concentrations of HPP^{+} and haloperidol with clinical variables (changes of Brief Psychiatric Rating Scale, Extrapyramidal Symptom Rating Scale) during the treatment of acute exacerbations of schizophrenic patients for 6 weeks. In a cross section study of chronic schizophrenic patients treated with haloperidol, the patients with more severe tardive dyskinesia had an increased relative body burden of HPP^{+} as calculated by the ratio of HPP^{+} and haloperidol serum concentrations multiplied by the cumulative dose of haloperidol.
