= Oxidopamine =

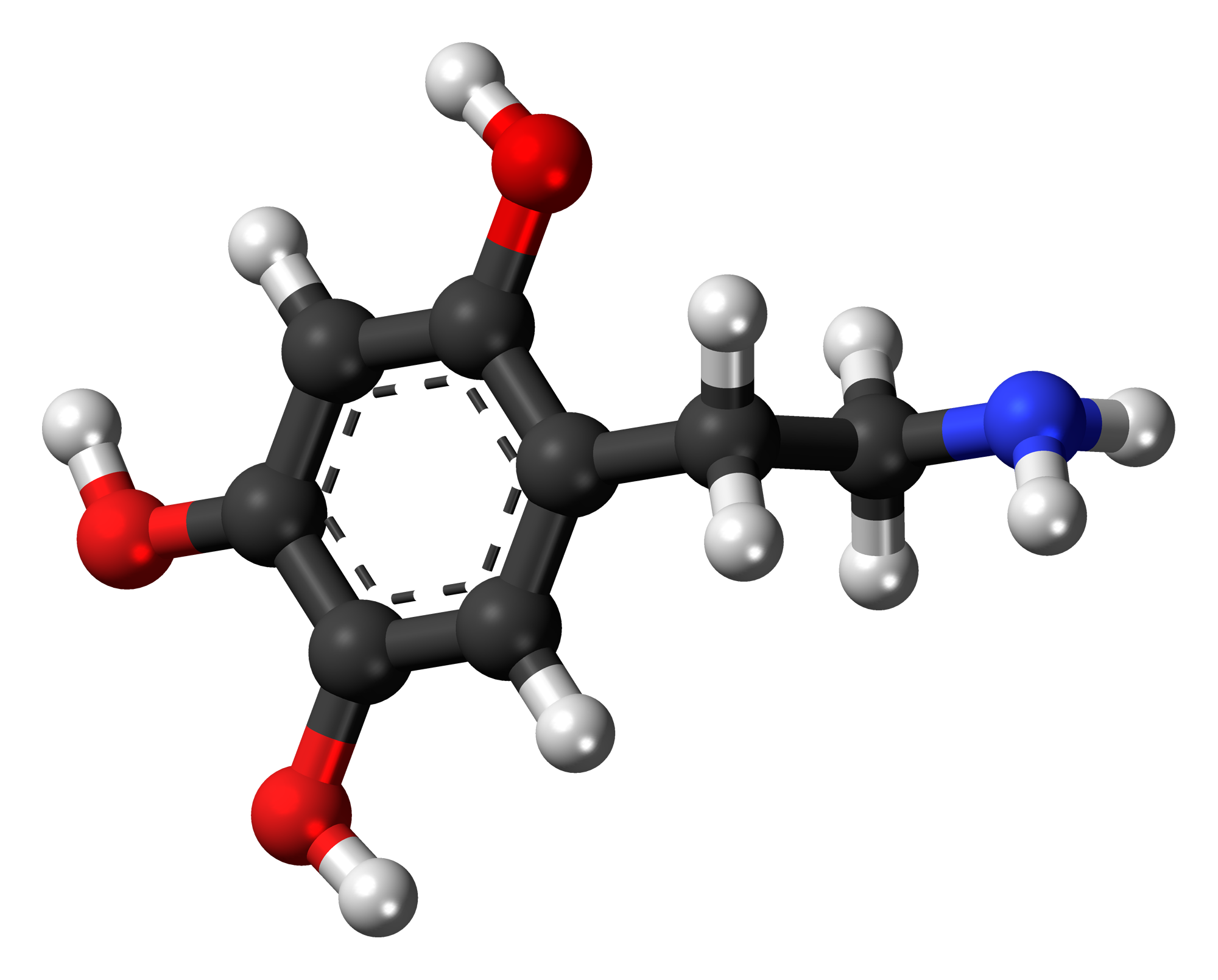

Names
- Preferred IUPAC name 5-(2-Aminoethyl)benzene-1,2,4-triol

Identifiers
| CAS Number | 1199-18-4 |
| 3D model (JSmol) | Interactive image |
| ChEBI | CHEBI:78741 |
| ChEMBL | ChEMBL337702 |
| ChemSpider | 4463 |
| ECHA InfoCard | 100.013.493 |
| EC Number | 214-842-3 |
| KEGG | D05294 |
| PubChem CID | 4624 |
| UNII | 8HW4YBZ748 |
| CompTox Dashboard (EPA) | DTXSID0036768 |
- InChI: InChI=1S/C8H11NO3/c9-2-1-5-3-7(11)8(12)4-6(5)10/h3-4,10-12H,1-2,9H2 Key: DIVDFFZHCJEHGG-UHFFFAOYSA-N; InChI=1/C8H11NO3/c9-2-1-5-3-7(11)8(12)4-6(5)10/h3-4,10-12H,1-2,9H2 Key: DIVDFFZHCJEHGG-UHFFFAOYAG
- SMILES: c1c(c(cc(c1O)O)O)CCN

Properties
| Chemical formula | C_{8}H_{11}NO_{3} |
| Molar mass | 169.180 g·mol^{−1} |
- Except where otherwise noted, data are given for materials in their standard state (at 25 °C [77 °F], 100 kPa). verify (what is ?) Infobox references

Oxidopamine, also known as 6-hydroxydopamine (6-OHDA) or 2,4,5-trihydroxyphenethylamine, is a synthetic monoaminergic neurotoxin used by researchers to selectively destroy dopaminergic and noradrenergic neurons in the brain.

The main use for oxidopamine in scientific research is to induce Parkinsonism in laboratory animals by lesioning the dopaminergic neurons of the substantia nigra pars compacta, in order to develop and test new medicines and treatments for Parkinson's disease.

== History ==
The neurotoxin oxidopamine has first been described in 1959. Years later, in 1968 the first model exploiting oxidopamine neurotoxicity was developed by Ungerstedt, obtaining an animal model of akinesia with a very high mortality rate. Ever since, oxidopamine has become an abundantly used neurotoxin for making animal models with Parkinson's disease.

== Usage ==
The toxin oxidopamine is an antagonist of the neurotransmitter dopamine, and is commonly used for making experimental animal models in Parkinson's disease. Parkinson disease leads to degeneration of dopaminergic midbrain neurons resulting in dopamine depletion. Therefore oxidopamine can induce Parkinson disease in animal models. These models can be used to do research for treatments for Parkinson's disease. The toxin is also used for experimental models of attention-deficit hyperactivity disorder and Lesch-Nyhan syndrome.

== Structure and reactivity ==
=== Structure ===
Oxidopamine is a neurotoxic, solid and organic compound, derived from dopamine. It is a benzenetriol which is derived from phenethylamine, where the hydrogens on the phenyl ring at positions 2, 4 and 5 are replaced by hydroxyl groups. Oxidopamine is a primary amino compound, a benzenetriol and a catecholamine. The molecular weight of this oxidopamine is 169.18 and has the following molecular formula; C_{8}H_{11}NO_{3}. The melting point of oxidopamine is 232 degrees celsius.

=== Reactivity and reactions ===
The toxin oxidopamine is a relatively unstable compound. In certain experimental conditions, oxidopamine will undergo autoxidation. This may result in the production of reactive oxygen species (ROS), mainly superoxide and hydrogen peroxide. ROS generation is also increased by oxidopamine via inhibition of complex I and IV of the electron transport chain.

It has no rapid reactions with air or water. The reactive groups for oxidopamine are the phenol-, and amine-group. Oxidopamine primarily interacts with structures containing norepinephrine, but also with structures containing dopamine. However the interactions with dopamine-containing structures are to a lesser extent.

== Synthesis ==
Oxidopamine was long ago characterized and synthesized, starting from 2,4,5-trimethoxy and 2,4,5-tribenzyloxybenzaldehyde respectively, by Harley-Mason and Lee and Dickson. The multistep synthesis of Senoh and Witkop involves the addition of Methanol to become an applicable o-quinone intermediate. In consequence of the general low yields and the relatively involved procedures, it is wished to report an alternate scheme for the synthesis of this pharmacon. In about 60% of the overall yield phenethylamine 3 is prepared via nitrostyrene by starting with isovanillin. The central step in synthesising oxidopamine is a Fremy's salt oxidation of 3-hydroxy-4-methoxyphenethylamine forming the corresponding p-quinone. The Teuber reaction only succeeds when the amino function is protected by acetylation, carbobenzoxylation or formylation. With the derivatives N-carbobenzoxy and N-acetyl almost quantitative yields of the p-quinone can be obtained.

== Available forms ==
Oxidopamine is directly injected into the nigrostriatal pathway, targeting the dopamine transporters (DAT). This can be done through stereotaxic injections whereas bilateral as unilateral is experimentally permitted. It will cause loss of dopamine terminals in the striatum by affecting the nigrostriatal pathway and causes loss of dopamine neurons in the Substantia nigra pars compacta (SNpc).

== Mechanisms ==
Oxidopamine is taken up by and accumulates in catecholaminergic neurons. This uptake is facilitated by dopamine and noradrenaline membrane receptors due to the structural similarity with dopamine and noradrenaline. Within the neuron, oxidopamine is oxidized by monoamine oxidase producing the toxic products hydrogen peroxide (H_{2}O_{2}), catecholamine quinones and reactive oxygen species (ROS). These quinones can attack endocellular nucleophillic groups.

6-hydroxidopamine + O_{2} → quinones + H_{2}O_{2}.

In order to induce Parkinsonism in animals, around 70% of the dopaminergic neurons in the substantia nigra of the brain must be destroyed, and this is often achieved either with oxidopamine or another neurotoxin MPTP. Both these agents likely destroy neurons by generating reactive oxygen species such as superoxide radicals. However, recent research suggests that 6-OHDA modifies proteins via cysteine modification, implying an additional cause of neuronal cell death.

== Metabolism ==
6-OHDA is thought to enter the neurons via the dopamine and noradrenaline (norepinephrine) reuptake transporters. Oxidopamine is often used in conjunction with a selective noradrenaline reuptake inhibitor (such as desipramine) to selectively destroy dopaminergic neurons.

== Efficacy and side effects ==
=== Efficacy ===
Oxidopamine is administered via an injection and causes an increase of outflow, and a decrease for intraocular pressure (IOP), lasting for a few days up to two weeks. The real purpose of 6-hydroxydopamine is to increase sensitivity to alpha- and beta-adrenergic agonists. The supersensitivity phase lasts for up to 6 months, and can be maintained by repeated injections.

=== Adverse effects ===
There are several effects linked to the usage of 6-hydroxydopamine. The most common adverse effects caused by injections are hyperemia, subconjunctival hemorrhage, transient mydriasis, chemosis, lid edema, and ptosis (which may last for a few weeks).

== Toxicity ==
There are several ways in which oxidopamine may cause toxicity, however it is often difficult what mechanism causes cell damage after exposure. It is also thought that toxic effects of 6-OHDA are caused by the uptake of the substance into the catecholaminergic nerve endings. This happens because the catecholaminergic transport system has a high affinity for 6-OHDA. Cell death by oxidopamine can be induced by three main mechanisms; ROS generation, H_{2}O_{2} generation, or direct inhibition of mitochondria.

The reaction to oxidopamine is often very site specific, making it important to inject it at the location it has to function. In order to cause toxicity in the brain, the oxidopamine has to be injected directly into the brain, since it is not able to cross the blood brain barrier.

== See also ==
- 5,7-Dihydroxytryptamine
- 6-Hydroxydopa
- 6-Aminodopamine
- DSP-4
- MPTP
- Norsalsolinol
- Rotenone
- FAUC50
