= Haloperidol =

Typical antipsychotic medication

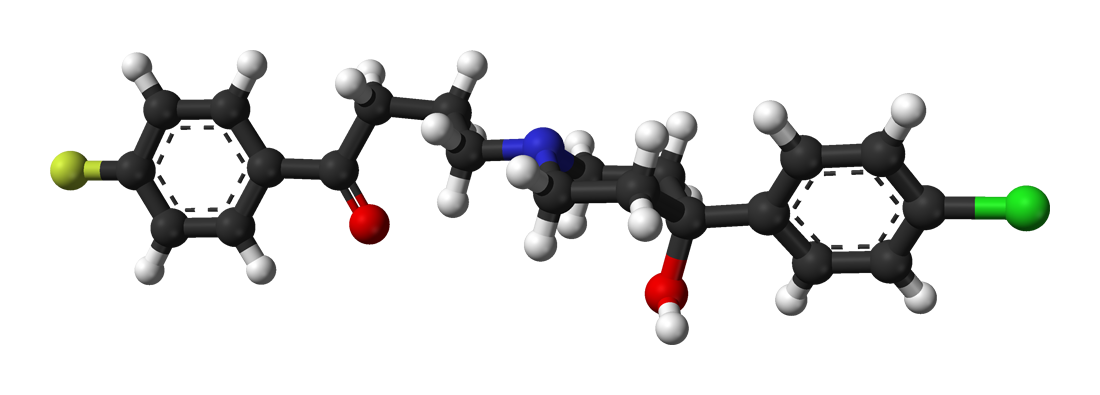

Clinical data
- Pronunciation: /ˌhæloʊˈpɛrɪdɒl/
- Trade names: Haldol, others
- AHFS/Drugs.com: Monograph
- MedlinePlus: a682180
- License data: US DailyMed: Haloperidol
- Pregnancy category: AU: C
- Routes of administration: By mouth, intramuscular, intravenous, depot (as decanoate ester)
- Drug class: Typical antipsychotic
- ATC code: N05AD01 (WHO)

Legal status
- Legal status: AU: S4 (Prescription only); BR: Class C1 (Other controlled substances); CA: ℞-only; NZ: Prescription only; UK: POM (Prescription only); US: ℞-only

Pharmacokinetic data
- Bioavailability: 60–70% (by mouth)
- Protein binding: ~90%
- Metabolism: Liver-mediated
- Metabolites: • HPP^{+}
- Elimination half-life: 14–26 hours (IV), 20.7 hours (IM), 14–37 hours (oral)
- Excretion: Biliary (hence in feces) and in urine

Identifiers
- IUPAC name: 4-[4-(4-Chlorophenyl)-4-hydroxypiperidin-1-yl]-1-(4-fluorophenyl)butan-1-one
- CAS Number: 52-86-8
- PubChem CID: 3559
- IUPHAR/BPS: 86
- DrugBank: DB00502
- ChemSpider: 3438
- UNII: J6292F8L3D
- KEGG: D00136
- ChEBI: CHEBI:5613
- ChEMBL: ChEMBL54
- CompTox Dashboard (EPA): DTXSID4034150
- ECHA InfoCard: 100.000.142

Chemical and physical data
- Formula: C_{21}H_{23}ClFNO_{2}
- Molar mass: 375.87 g·mol^{−1}
- 3D model (JSmol): Interactive image
- SMILES: c1cc(ccc1C(=O)CCCN2CCC(CC2)(c3ccc(cc3)Cl)O)F
- InChI: InChI=1S/C21H23ClFNO2/c22-18-7-5-17(6-8-18)21(26)11-14-24(15-12-21)13-1-2-20(25)16-3-9-19(23)10-4-16/h3-10,26H,1-2,11-15H2; Key:LNEPOXFFQSENCJ-UHFFFAOYSA-N

Haloperidol, sold under the brand name Haldol among others, is a typical antipsychotic medication. Haloperidol is used in the treatment of schizophrenia, tics in Tourette syndrome, mania in bipolar disorder, delirium, agitation, acute psychosis, and hallucinations from alcohol withdrawal. It may be used by mouth or injection into a muscle or a vein. Haloperidol typically works within 30 to 60 minutes. A long-acting formulation may be used as an injection every four weeks for people with schizophrenia or related illnesses, who either forget or refuse to take the medication by mouth.

Haloperidol may result in movement disorders such as tardive dyskinesia, and akathisia, both of which may be permanent. Neuroleptic malignant syndrome and QT interval prolongation may occur, the latter particularly with IV administration. In older people with psychosis due to dementia it results in an increased risk of death. When taken during pregnancy it may result in problems in the infant. It should not be used by people with Parkinson's disease.

Haloperidol was discovered in 1958 by the team of Paul Janssen, prepared as part of a structure-activity relationship investigation into analogs of pethidine (meperidine). It is on the World Health Organization's List of Essential Medicines. It is the most commonly used typical antipsychotic. In 2020, it was the 303rd most commonly prescribed medication in the United States, with more than 1 million prescriptions.

== Medical uses ==
Haloperidol is used in the control of the symptoms of:

- Acute psychosis, such as drug-induced psychosis caused by ketamine, and phencyclidine, and psychosis associated with high fever or metabolic disease. Some evidence has found haloperidol to worsen psychosis due to psilocybin.
- Adjunctive treatment of alcohol and opioid withdrawal
- Agitation and confusion associated with cerebral sclerosis
- Alcohol-induced psychosis
- Hallucinations in alcohol withdrawal
- Hyperactive delirium (to control the agitation component of delirium)
- Hyperactivity, aggression
- Otherwise uncontrollable, severe behavioral disorders in children and adolescents
- Schizophrenia
- Therapeutic trial in personality disorders, such as borderline personality disorder
- Treatment of intractable hiccups
- Treatment of neurological disorders, including tic disorders such as Tourette syndrome, and chorea
- Treatment of severe nausea and emesis in postoperative and palliative care, especially for palliating adverse effects of radiation therapy and chemotherapy in oncology. Also used as a first line antiemetic for acute cannabinoid hyperemesis syndrome.
- As chemical restraint in acute care psychiatry, mainly for violent and self-harming patients (controversial use but very commonly found in movies).

Haloperidol was considered indispensable for treating psychiatric emergency situations. However, the newer atypical drugs have gained a greater role in a number of situations, as outlined in a series of consensus reviews published between 2001 and 2005.

In a 2013 comparison of 15 antipsychotics in schizophrenia, haloperidol demonstrated standard effectiveness. It was 13–16% more effective than ziprasidone, chlorpromazine, and asenapine, approximately as effective as quetiapine and aripiprazole, and 10% less effective than paliperidone. A 2013 systematic review compared haloperidol to placebo in schizophrenia:

Summary
Haloperidol often causes troublesome adverse effects. If there is no other antipsychotic drug, using haloperidol to offset the consequences of untreated schizophrenia is justified. Where a choice of drug is available, however, an alternative antipsychotic with less likelihood of adverse effects such as parkinsonism, akathisia and acute dystonias may be more desirable.

Outcome	Findings in words	Findings in numbers	Quality of evidence
General outcomes
No marked global improvement Follow-up: >6–24 weeks	Haloperidol, when compared with placebo, reduces the chance of experiencing 'no improvement'. Data are based on moderate quality evidence.	RR 0.67 (0.58 to 0.78)	Moderate
Not discharged from hospital Follow-up: > 6–24 weeks	Haloperidol may reduce the chance of staying in hospital, but, at present it is not possible to be confident about the difference between people receiving haloperidol and people taking placebo. Data supporting this finding are very limited.	RR 0.85 (0.47 to 1.52)	Very low
Relapse; Follow-up: < 52 weeks	Haloperidol may reduce the chance of relapse, but, at present there is only very limited data supporting this finding.	RR 0.69 (0.55 to 0.86)	Very low
Leaving the study early
Follow-up: > 6–24 weeks	Haloperidol probably slightly reduces the risk of loss to follow up, but the difference between the two treatments is not quite clear. Data supporting this finding are based on moderate quality evidence.	RR 0.54 (0.29 to 1)	Moderate
Adverse effects – movement disorders
Parkinsonism; Follow-up: 3 weeks to 3 months	Haloperidol substantially increases the risk of movement disorders. Data are based on moderate quality evidence.	RR 5.48 (2.68 to 11.22)	Moderate
Missing outcomes
	Severe adverse events, such as death, and outcomes such as satisfaction with treatment were not measured/reported in the included studies.		

In contrast to certain other antipsychotics like risperidone, haloperidol is ineffective as a hallucinogen antidote or "trip killer" in blocking the effects of serotonergic psychedelics like psilocybin and lysergic acid diethylamide (LSD).

=== Pregnancy and lactation ===
Data from animal experiments indicate haloperidol is not teratogenic, but is embryotoxic in high doses. In humans, no controlled studies exist. Reports in pregnant women revealed possible damage to the fetus, although most of the women were exposed to multiple drugs during pregnancy. In addition, reports indicate neonates exposed to antipsychotic drugs are at risk for extrapyramidal and/or withdrawal symptoms following delivery, such as agitation, hypertonia, hypotonia, tremor, somnolence, respiratory distress, and feeding disorder. Following accepted general principles, haloperidol should be given during pregnancy only if the benefit to the mother clearly outweighs the potential fetal risk.

Haloperidol is excreted in breast milk. A few studies have examined the impact of haloperidol exposure on breastfed infants and in most cases, there were no adverse effects on infant growth and development.

=== Other considerations ===
Skeletal formula of haloperidol decanoate. The decanoate group is highlighted in red.

During long-term treatment of chronic psychiatric disorders, the daily dose should be reduced to the lowest level needed for maintenance of remission. Sometimes, it may be indicated to terminate haloperidol treatment gradually. In addition, during long-term use, routine monitoring including measurement of BMI, blood pressure, fasting blood sugar, and lipids, is recommended due to the risk of side effects.

Other forms of therapy (psychotherapy, occupational therapy/ergotherapy, or social rehabilitation) should be instituted properly. PET imaging studies have suggested low doses are preferable. Clinical response was associated with at least 65% occupancy of D2 receptors, while greater than 72% was likely to cause hyperprolactinaemia and over 78% associated with extrapyramidal side effects. Doses of haloperidol greater than 5 mg increased the risk of side effects without improving efficacy. Patients responded with doses under even 2 mg in first-episode psychosis. For maintenance treatment of schizophrenia, an international consensus conference recommended a reduction dosage by about 20% every 6 months until a minimal maintenance dose is established.

- Depot forms are also available; these are injected deeply intramuscularly at regular intervals. The depot forms are not suitable for initial treatment, but are suitable for patients who have demonstrated inconsistency with oral dosages.

The decanoate ester of haloperidol (haloperidol decanoate, trade names Haldol decanoate, Halomonth, Neoperidole) has a much longer duration of action, so is often used in people known to be noncompliant with oral medication. A dose is given by intramuscular injection once every two to four weeks. The IUPAC name of haloperidol decanoate is [4-(4-chlorophenyl)-1-[4-(4-fluorophenyl)-4-oxobutyl]piperidin-4-yl] decanoate.

Topical formulations of haloperidol should not be used as treatment for nausea because research does not indicate this therapy is more effective than alternatives.

== Adverse effects ==
Sources for the following lists of adverse effects:

As haloperidol is a high-potency typical antipsychotic, it tends to produce significant extrapyramidal side effects. According to a 2013 meta-analysis of the comparative efficacy and tolerability of 15 antipsychotic drugs it was the most prone of the 15 for causing extrapyramidal side effects.

With more than 6 months of use 14 percent of users gain weight. Haloperidol may be neurotoxic.

Prolonged use of the drug can lead to mental dependence.

Common (>1% incidence)

- Extrapyramidal side effects including:
  - Akathisia (motor restlessness)
  - Dystonia (continuous spasms and muscle contractions)
  - Muscle rigidity
  - Parkinsonism (characteristic symptoms such as rigidity)
- Hypotension
- Anticholinergic side effects such as: (These adverse effects are less common than with lower-potency typical antipsychotics, such as chlorpromazine and thioridazine.)
  - Blurred vision
  - Constipation
  - Dry mouth
- Somnolence (which is not a particularly prominent side effect, as is supported by the results of the aforementioned meta-analysis.)

Unknown frequency

- Anemia
- Headache
- Increased respiratory rate
- Orthostatic hypotension
- Prolonged QT interval
- Visual disturbances

Rare (<1% incidence)

- Acute hepatic failure
- Agitation
- Agranulocytosis
- Anaphylactic reaction
- Anorexia
- Bronchospasm
- Cataracts
- Cholestasis
- Confusional state
- Depression
- Dermatitis exfoliative
- Dyspnea
- Edema
- Extrasystoles
- Face edema
- Gynecomastia
- Hepatitis
- Hyperglycemia
- Hypersensitivity
- Hyperthermia
- Hypoglycemia
- Hyponatremia
- Hypothermia
- Increased sweating
- Injection site abscess
- Insomnia
- Itchiness
- Jaundice
- Laryngeal edema
- Laryngospasm
- Leukocytoclastic vasculitis
- Leukopenia
- Liver function test abnormal
- Nausea
- Neuroleptic malignant syndrome
- Neutropenia
- Pancytopenia
- Photosensitivity reaction
- Priapism
- Psychotic disorder
- Pulmonary embolism
- Rash
- Retinopathy
- Seizure
- Sudden death
- Tardive dyskinesia
- Thrombocytopenia
- Torsades de pointes
- Urinary retention
- Urticaria
- Ventricular fibrillation
- Ventricular tachycardia
- Vomiting

=== Contraindications ===
- Pre-existing coma, acute stroke
- Severe intoxication with alcohol or other central depressant drugs
- Known allergy against haloperidol or other butyrophenones or other drug ingredients
- Known heart disease, when combined will tend towards cardiac arrest

=== Special cautions ===
- A multiple-year study suggested this drug and other neuroleptic antipsychotic drugs commonly given to people with Alzheimer's with mild behavioral problems often make their condition worse and its withdrawal was even beneficial for some cognitive and functional measures.
- Elderly patients with dementia-related psychosis: analysis of 17 trials showed the risk of death in this group of patients was 1.6 to 1.7 times that of placebo-treated patients. Most of the causes of death were either cardiovascular or infectious in nature. It is not clear to what extent this observation is attributed to antipsychotic drugs rather than the characteristics of the patients. The drug bears a boxed warning about this risk.
- Impaired liver function, as haloperidol is metabolized and eliminated mainly by the liver
- In patients with hyperthyroidism, the action of haloperidol is intensified and side effects are more likely.
- IV injections: risk of hypotension or orthostatic collapse
- Patients at special risk for the development of QT prolongation (hypokalemia, concomitant use of other drugs causing QT prolongation)
- Patients with a history of leukopenia: a complete blood count should be monitored frequently during the first few months of therapy and discontinuation of the drug should be considered at the first sign of a clinically significant decline in white blood cells.
- Pre-existing Parkinson's disease or dementia with Lewy bodies

=== Interactions ===
- Amiodarone: Q-Tc interval prolongation (potentially dangerous change in heart rhythm).
- Amphetamine and methylphenidate: counteracts increased action of norepinephrine and dopamine in patients with narcolepsy or ADD/ADHD
- Epinephrine: action antagonized, paradoxical decrease in blood pressure may result
- Guanethidine: antihypertensive action antagonized
- Levodopa: decreased action of levodopa
- Lithium: rare cases of the following symptoms have been noted: encephalopathy, early and late extrapyramidal side effects, other neurologic symptoms, and coma.
- Methyldopa: increased risk of extrapyramidal side effects and other unwanted central effects
- Other central depressants (alcohol, tranquilizers, narcotics): actions and side effects of these drugs (sedation, respiratory depression) are increased. In particular, the doses of concomitantly used opioids for chronic pain can be reduced by 50%.
- Other drugs metabolized by the CYP3A4 enzyme system: inducers such as carbamazepine, phenobarbital, and rifampicin decrease plasma levels and inhibitors such as quinidine, buspirone, and fluoxetine increase plasma levels
- Tricyclic antidepressants: metabolism and elimination of tricyclics significantly decreased, increased toxicity noted (anticholinergic and cardiovascular side effects, lowering of seizure threshold)

=== Potential neurotoxicity ===
Several lines of evidence suggest that haloperidol exhibits neurotoxicity. Some studies report an association between antipsychotic medications, especially first-generation agents, and a decline in gray matter volume. Haloperidol irreversibly blocks the sigma σ^{1} receptor. It may exert deleterious effects on the dorsolateral prefrontal cortex (DLPFC) by attenuating brain-derived neurotrophic factor (BDNF) transcription and expression, associated with an increase in the long non-coding RNA BDNF-AS in the DLPFC. Besides the preceding mechanisms, haloperidol metabolizes into HPP^{+}, a monoaminergic neurotoxin related to MPTP. This might be involved in the extrapyramidal symptoms that develop with long-term haloperidol therapy.

=== Discontinuation ===
The British National Formulary recommends a gradual withdrawal when discontinuing antipsychotics to avoid acute withdrawal syndrome or rapid relapse. Symptoms of withdrawal commonly include nausea, vomiting, and loss of appetite. Other symptoms may include restlessness, increased sweating, and trouble sleeping. Less commonly there may be a feeling of the world spinning, numbness, or muscle pains. Symptoms generally resolve after a short period of time.

There is tentative evidence that discontinuation of antipsychotics can result in psychosis. It may also result in reoccurrence of the condition that is being treated. Rarely tardive dyskinesia can occur when the medication is stopped.

== Overdose ==
=== Symptoms ===
Symptoms are usually due to side effects. Most often encountered are:

- Anticholinergic side effects (dry mouth, constipation, paralytic ileus, difficulties in urinating, decreased perspiration)
- Coma in severe cases, accompanied by respiratory depression and massive hypotension, shock
- Hypotension or hypertension
- Rarely, serious ventricular arrhythmia (torsades de pointes), with or without prolonged QT-time
- Sedation
- Severe extrapyramidal side effects with muscle rigidity and tremors, akathisia, etc.

=== Treatment ===
Treatment is mostly symptomatic and involves intensive care with stabilization of vital functions. In early detected cases of oral overdose, induction of emesis, gastric lavage, and the use of activated charcoal can be tried. In the case of a severe overdose, antidotes such as bromocriptine or ropinirole may be used to treat the extrapyramidal effects caused by haloperidol, acting as dopamine receptor agonists. ECG and vital signs should be monitored especially for QT prolongation and severe arrhythmias should be treated with antiarrhythmic measures.

=== Prognosis ===
An overdose of haloperidol can be fatal, but in general the prognosis after overdose is good, provided the person has survived the initial phase.

== Pharmacology ==
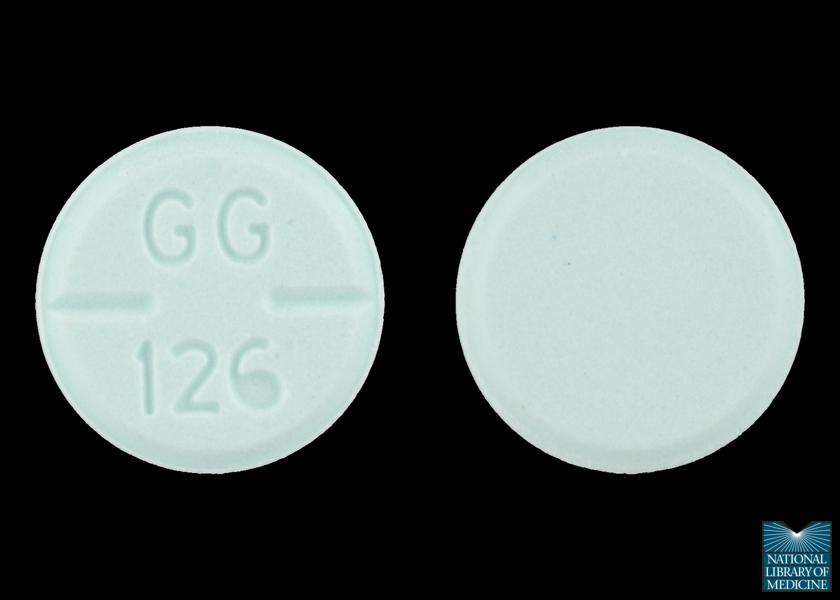
Haloperidol, 10-mg oral tablet

Haloperidol is a typical butyrophenone-type antipsychotic that exhibits high-affinity dopamine D_{2} receptor antagonism and slow receptor dissociation kinetics. It has effects similar to the phenothiazines. The drug binds preferentially to D_{2} and α_{1} receptors at low dose (ED_{50} = 0.13 and 0.42 mg/kg, respectively), and 5-HT_{2} receptors at a higher dose (ED_{50} = 2.6 mg/kg). Given that antagonism of D_{2} receptors is more beneficial on the positive symptoms of schizophrenia and antagonism of 5-HT_{2} receptors on the negative symptoms, this characteristic underlies haloperidol's greater effect on delusions, hallucinations and other manifestations of psychosis. Haloperidol's negligible affinity for histamine H_{1} receptors and muscarinic M_{1} acetylcholine receptors yields an antipsychotic with a lower incidence of sedation, weight gain, and orthostatic hypotension though having higher rates of treatment emergent extrapyramidal symptoms.

Haloperidol binding profile
Receptor	Action	K_{i} (nM)
D_{1}	silent antagonist	45
D_{5}	silent antagonist	Unknown efficiency
D_{2}	inverse agonist	0.7
D_{3}	inverse agonist	0.2
D_{4}	inverse agonist	5–9
σ_{1}	(irreversible inactivation by haloperidol metabolites)	3
σ_{2}	agonist	54
5-HT_{1A}	agonist	1927
5-HT_{2A}	silent antagonist	53
5-HT_{2C}	silent antagonist	10000+
5-HT_{6}	silent antagonist	3666
5-HT_{7}	irreversible silent antagonist	377.2
H_{1}	silent antagonist	1800
M_{1}	silent antagonist	10000+
α_{1A}	silent antagonist	12
α_{2A}	Agonist	1130
α_{2B}	Agonist	480
α_{2C}	Agonist	550
NR1/NR2B subunit containing NMDA receptor	antagonist; ifenprodil site	IC_{50} – 2.0

=== Pharmacokinetics ===
==== By mouth ====
The bioavailability of oral haloperidol ranges from 60 to 70%. However, there is a wide variance in reported mean T_{max} and T_{1/2} in different studies, ranging from 1.7 to 6.1 hours and 14.5 to 36.7 hours respectively.

==== Intramuscular injections ====
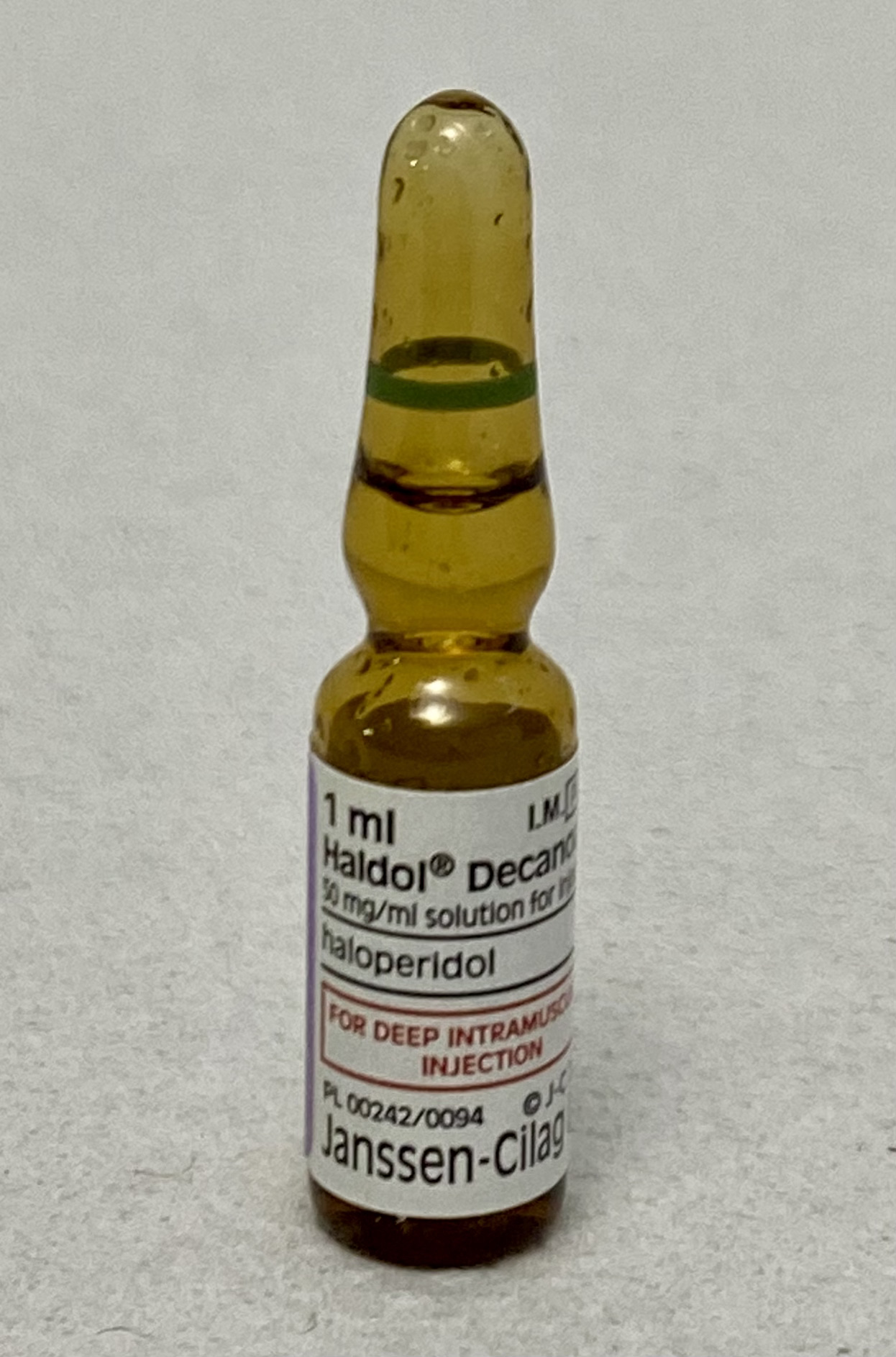
Haldol Decanoate for injection into muscle

The drug is well and rapidly absorbed with a high bioavailability when injected intramuscularly. The T_{max} is 20 minutes in healthy individuals and 33.8 minutes in patients with schizophrenia. The mean T_{1/2} is 20.7 hours. The decanoate injectable formulation is for intramuscular administration only and is not intended to be used intravenously. The plasma concentrations of haloperidol decanoate reach a peak at about six days after the injection, falling thereafter, with an approximate half-life of three weeks.

==== Intravenous injections ====
The bioavailability is 100% in intravenous (IV) injection, and the very rapid onset of action is seen within seconds. The T_{1/2} is 14.1 to 26.2 hours. The apparent volume of distribution is between 9.5 and 21.7 L/kg. The duration of action is four to six hours.

==== Therapeutic concentrations ====
Plasma levels of five to 15 micrograms per liter are typically seen for therapeutic response (Ulrich S, et al. Clin Pharmacokinet. 1998). The determination of plasma levels is rarely used to calculate dose adjustments but can be useful to check compliance.

The concentration of haloperidol in brain tissue is about 20-fold higher compared to blood levels. It is slowly eliminated from brain tissue, which may explain the slow disappearance of side effects when the medication is stopped.

==== Distribution and metabolism ====
Haloperidol is heavily protein bound in human plasma, with a free fraction of only 7.5 to 11.6%. It is also extensively metabolized in the liver with only about 1% of the administered dose excreted unchanged in the urine. The greatest proportion of the hepatic clearance is by glucuronidation, followed by reduction and CYP-mediated oxidation, primarily by CYP3A4. Haloperidol is metabolized into HPP^{+}, a monoaminergic neurotoxin related to MPTP, by CYP3A enzymes.

== Chemistry ==
Haloperidol is a crystalline material with a melting temperature of 150 °C. This drug has very low solubility in water (1.4 mg/100 mL), but it is soluble in chloroform, benzene, methanol, and acetone. It is also soluble in 0.1 M hydrochloric acid (3 mg/mL) with heating.

== History ==
Haloperidol was discovered by Paul Janssen. It was developed in 1958 at the Belgian company Janssen Pharmaceutica and submitted to the first of clinical trials in Belgium later that year.

Haloperidol was approved by the U.S. Food and Drug Administration (FDA) on 12 April 1967; it was later marketed in the U.S. and other countries under the brand name Haldol by McNeil Laboratories.

== Society and culture ==
=== Cost ===
Haloperidol is relatively inexpensive, being up to 100 fold less expensive than newer antipsychotics.

=== Names ===
Haloperidol is the INN, BAN, USAN, AAN approved name.

It is sold under the tradenames Aloperidin, Bioperidolo, Brotopon, Dozic, Duraperidol (Germany), Einalon S, Eukystol, Haldol (common tradename in the US and UK), Halol, Halosten, Keselan, Linton, Peluces, Serenace Norodol (Turkey) and Sigaperidol.

== Research ==
Haloperidol was under investigation for the treatment of depression. It was employed as a short-term low-dose dopamine receptor antagonist to upregulate dopamine receptors and produce receptor supersensitivity followed by drug withdrawal as a means of treating depression.

== Veterinary use ==
Haloperidol is also used on many different kinds of animals for nonselective tranquilization and diminishing behavioral arousal, in veterinary and other settings including captivity management.
