= 6-Hydroxydopa =

Catecholaminergic neurotoxin

Clinical data
- Other names: 6-OH-DOPA; 6-OHDOPA
- Drug class: Catecholaminergic neurotoxin

Identifiers
- IUPAC name: (2S)-2-amino-3-(2,4,5-trihydroxyphenyl)propanoic acid
- CAS Number: 27244-64-0
- PubChem CID: 33755
- ChemSpider: 31117
- UNII: 580PK2O48O
- ChEBI: CHEBI:72753
- ChEMBL: ChEMBL1256516

Chemical and physical data
- Formula: C_{9}H_{11}NO_{5}
- Molar mass: 213.189 g·mol^{−1}
- 3D model (JSmol): Interactive image
- SMILES: C1=C(C(=CC(=C1O)O)O)C[C@@H](C(=O)O)N
- InChI: InChI=1S/C9H11NO5/c10-5(9(14)15)1-4-2-7(12)8(13)3-6(4)11/h2-3,5,11-13H,1,10H2,(H,14,15)/t5-/m0/s1; Key:YLKRUSPZOTYMAT-YFKPBYRVSA-N

6-Hydroxydopa (6-OH-DOPA; 6-OHDOPA) is a catecholaminergic neurotoxin that damages noradrenergic and dopaminergic neurons and is used in scientific research. It is a precursor and prodrug of 6-hydroxydopamine (6-OHDA). The drug is a derivative of levodopa (L-DOPA). It has certain advantages over 6-OHDA, such as the ability to cross the blood–brain barrier into the central nervous system and hence the ability to be administered systemically rather than directly into the brain. 6-OH-DOPA was first described in the scientific literature by 1969.
