= 7-Hydroxytryptophan =

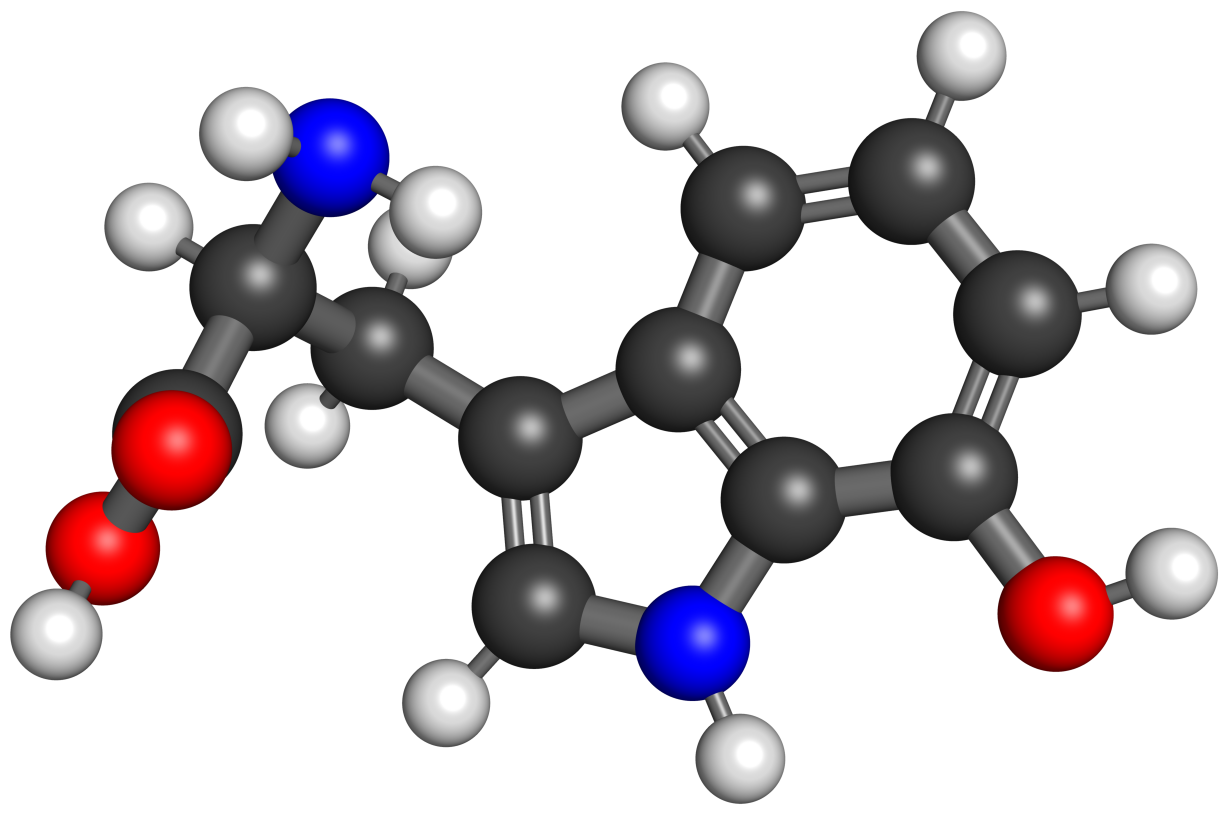

Names
- IUPAC name 2-amino-3-(7-hydroxy-1H-indol-3-yl)propanoic acid

Identifiers
CAS Number	52899-02-2
3D model (JSmol)	Interactive image
ChEBI	CHEBI:70777
ChemSpider	2043769
MeSH	5-Hydroxytryptophan
PubChem CID	2763071
CompTox Dashboard (EPA)	DTXSID00376717
- InChI: InChI=1S/C11H12N2O3/c12-8(11(15)16)4-6-5-13-10-7(6)2-1-3-9(10)14/h1-3,5,8,13-14H,4,12H2,(H,15,16) Key: VQSRKJZICBNQJG-UHFFFAOYSA-N
- SMILES: C1=CC2=C(C(=C1)O)NC=C2CC(C(=O)O)N

Properties
Chemical formula	C_{11}H_{12}N_{2}O_{3}
Molar mass	220.228 g·mol^{−1}
- Except where otherwise noted, data are given for materials in their standard state (at 25 °C [77 °F], 100 kPa). Infobox references

7-Hydroxytryptophan (7-HTP) is a non-proteinogenic amino acid. It is also a 5-hydroxytryptophan (5-HTP) positional isomer, a L-tryptophan derivative, structurally belonging to the hydroxytryptophan family, and a substituted tryptophan with a hydroxyl group at position 7 of the indole ring. It is not a precursor of serotonin. 7-Hydroxytryptophan is a metabolite detected in human urine.

It has been investigated for its role as a precursor in melanin-related oxidative processes.

7-Hydroxytryptophan is found in human urine, but its formation pathway in the body is unknown.

== Natural occurrence ==
7-Hydroxytryptophan is present in the mussel adhesive protein Pvfp-1 of Perna viridis as a post-translationally modified tryptophan residue. This modified residue exhibits redox activity, potentially substituting for DOPA.

7-Hydroxytryptophan was first identified in fungi and was isolated from the fruiting bodies of the fungus Cortinarius purpurascens, where it can serve as a precursor for the synthesis of azepino-indole alkaloids (so-called purpurascenins A–C) via the Pictet–Spengler reaction.

== 7-Hydroxytryptophan in archaea ==
7-hydroxytryptophan has been identified as a rare post-translational modification in the active site of the enzyme MCR (methyl-coenzyme M reductase) in methanotrophic archaea (ANME-MCR group) But the role of ANME is assumed to be that 7-hydroxytryptophan compensates for the lack of arginine methylation.

== Metabolism ==
In normal tissues, 7-HTP either remains metabolically inactive or is incorporated into normal amino acid metabolism pathways without the formation of toxic products.

In tumor cells expressing tryptophan hydroxylase, 7-hydroxytryptophan is enzymatically converted in situ into the toxic compound 5,7-dihydroxytryptamine (5,7-DHT). This metabolite induces apoptosis selectively in serotonin-producing tumor cells. And also interferes with the autocrine ability to synthesize serotonin. The conversion of 7-HTP to 5,7-DHT is completely inhibited by the specific tryptophan hydroxylase inhibitor para-chlorophenylalanine (Fenclonine).

== Pharmacology ==
Oxidase from the gill plates of mussels (Mytilus edulis) is able to oxidize 7-Hydroxytryptophan and other related compounds, whereas mammalian ceruloplasmin has almost no effect on the compounds.

== See also ==
- 5,7-dihydroxytryptamine
- 5-Hydroxytryptophan
- Tryptophan hydroxylase
- Post-translational modification
