= Cerebral dopamine neurotrophic factor =

Protein-coding gene in the species Homo sapiens

CDNF
Available structures
PDB	Ortholog search: PDBe RCSB
PDB	List of PDB id codes 2LPN, 2W50, 4BIT

Identifiers
- Aliases: CDNF, ARMETL1, cerebral dopamine neurotrophic factor
- External IDs: OMIM: 611233; MGI: 3606576; HomoloGene: 27965; GeneCards: CDNF; OMA:CDNF - orthologs

Gene location (Human)
Chr.	Chromosome 10 (human)
Band	10p13	Start	14,819,245 bp
Band	10p13	End	14,838,575 bp

Gene location (Mouse)
Chr.	Chromosome 2 (mouse)
Band	2|2 A1	Start	3,514,067 bp
Band	2|2 A1	End	3,527,413 bp
RNA expression pattern
Bgee	Human / Mouse (ortholog); Top expressed in: muscle of thigh; gastrocnemius muscle; left testis; right testis; sperm; right uterine tube; testicle; Achilles tendon; olfactory zone of nasal mucosa; gonad / Top expressed in: quadriceps femoris muscle; muscle of thigh; skeletal muscle tissue; esophagus; spermatocyte; zone of skin; urinary bladder; lip; white adipose tissue; embryo; More reference expression data
BioGPS	n/a
Gene ontology
Molecular function	growth factor activity
Cellular component	extracellular region; extracellular space; endoplasmic reticulum
Biological process	neuron projection development; dopaminergic neuron differentiation; regulation of signaling receptor activity; signal transduction
Sources:Amigo / QuickGO
Orthologs
Species	Human	Mouse
Entrez	441549	227526
Ensembl	ENSG00000185267	ENSMUSG00000039496
UniProt	Q49AH0	Q8CC36
RefSeq (mRNA)	NM_001029954	NM_177647
RefSeq (protein)	NP_001025125	NP_808315
Location (UCSC)	Chr 10: 14.82 – 14.84 Mb	Chr 2: 3.51 – 3.53 Mb
PubMed search
- Wikidata
View/Edit Human	View/Edit Mouse

Cerebral dopamine neurotrophic factor also known as ARMET-like protein 1 is a protein that in humans is encoded by the CDNF gene.

In preclinical models, localized injections of CDNF prevent and restore 6-OHDA induced dopaminergic lesions.
