= Psilomethoxin =

Chemical compound

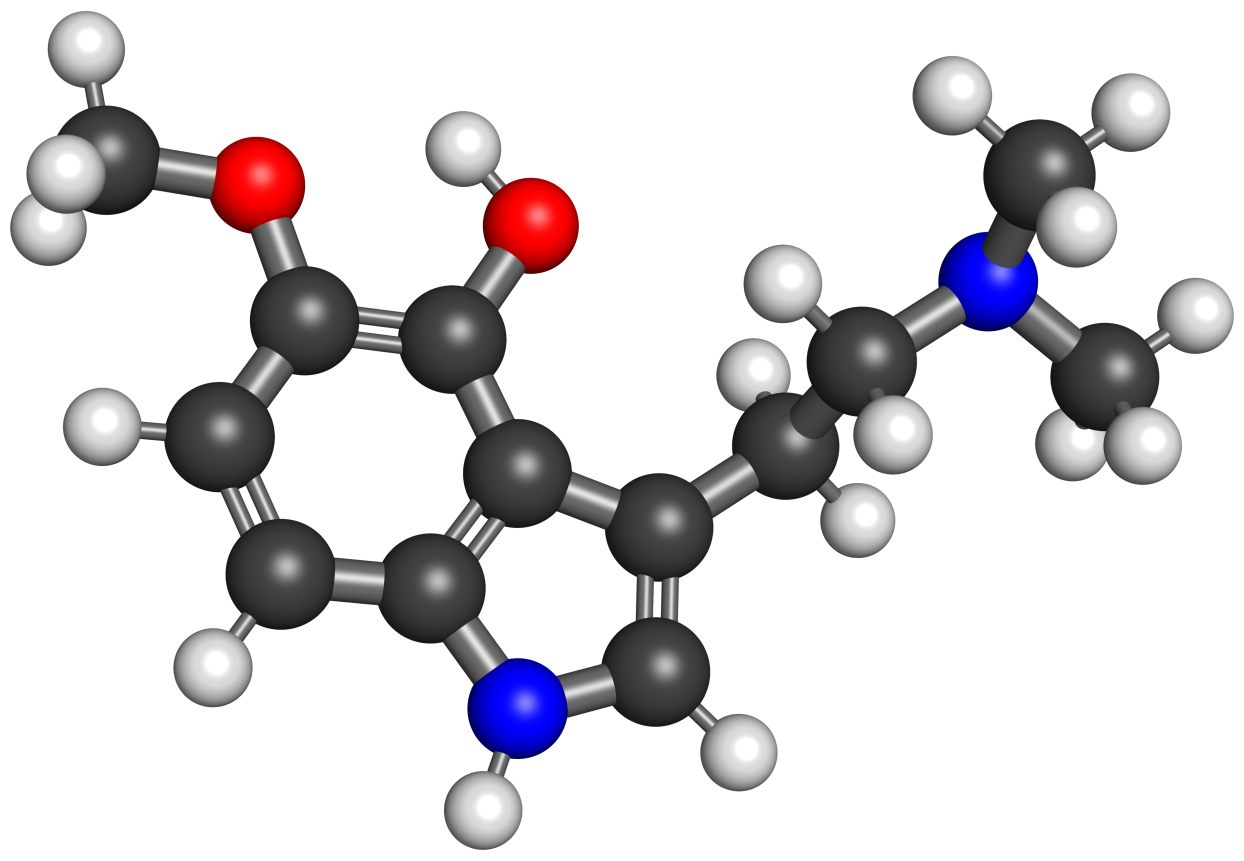

Clinical data
- Other names: 5-Methoxypsilocin; 5-MeO-psilocin; 5-MeO-4-HO-DMT; 4-Hydroxy-5-methoxy-N,N-dimethyltryptamine; 4-HO-5-MeO-DMT
- Drug class: Possible serotonergic psychedelic or hallucinogen
- ATC code: None

Identifiers
- IUPAC name: 3-(2-(dimethylamino)ethyl)-5-methoxy-1H-indol-4-ol
- CAS Number: 2433-31-0
- PubChem CID: 57459769
- ChemSpider: 21106242
- UNII: DZ7JH6CVB7

Chemical and physical data
- Formula: C_{13}H_{18}N_{2}O_{2}
- Molar mass: 234.299 g·mol^{−1}
- 3D model (JSmol): Interactive image
- Melting point: 146 to 147 °C (295 to 297 °F) (from ethyl acetate)
- SMILES: CN(C)CCc2c[nH]c1ccc(OC)c(O)c12
- InChI: InChI=1S/C13H18N2O2/c1-15(2)7-6-9-8-14-10-4-5-11(17-3)13(16)12(9)10/h4-5,8,14,16H,6-7H2,1-3H3; Key:YTBHRCRBKLRGBT-UHFFFAOYSA-N

Psilomethoxin, also known as 5-methoxypsilocin or as 4-hydroxy-5-methoxy-N,N-dimethyltryptamine (4-HO-5-MeO-DMT), is a compound of the tryptamine family which has been speculated may have psychedelic effects. It is related to psilocin (4-HO-DMT) and 5-MeO-DMT and in terms of chemical structure can be thought of as a combination of the structural features of the two compounds. The drug has been encountered as a novel designer drug online.

== Use and effects ==
Psilomethoxin is claimed to have a rapid onset and a duration of 4 to 8 hours.

== Scientific research ==
Very little is known about psilomethoxin. The only report of it in the chemical literature was a paper published by Marc Julia's group at the Pasteur Institute in 1965. This paper reports a 10-step synthesis of psilomethoxin from ortho-vanillin. Alexander Shulgin hypothesized that psilomethoxin could be biosynthesized by feeding Psilocybe cultures with 5-MeO-DMT, referencing a 1988 study by Jochen Gartz where transformation of DET into 4-HO-DET and 4-PO-DET was reported using such a method, with neither compounds having ever been found in nature. Shulgin says that psilomethoxin has not been yet explored, but that it would be a fascinating and promising compound to evaluate. However, others have noted that psilomethoxin bears a close structural resemblance to known serotonergic neurotoxins such as 4,5-dihydroxytryptamine (4,5-DHT) and 4-hydroxy-5-methoxytryptamine (4-HO-5-MeO-T).

== Society and culture ==
=== The Church of the Sacred Synthesis ===
The Church of the Sacred Synthesis, formerly known as the Church of Psilomethoxin, founded in 2022, claims to use psilomethoxin as its sacrament. It claims to produce psilomethoxin by feeding 5-MeO-DMT to psilocybin mushrooms to biosynthesize psilomethoxin in addition to psilocybin. The church sells the sacrament to its members who join the church online and then are mailed the sacrament, which has led to the church being referred to as the so-called "mail-order mushroom church". A 2023 study by Usona Institute chemists tested samples of their sacrament and found no traces of psilomethoxin or its putative prodrug 5-methoxypsilocybin, but did find the usual constituents of psilocybin mushrooms such as psilocybin, baeocystin, and psilocin. Psychedelic researchers such as David E. Nichols have stated that the church's claims about psilomethoxin are "nonsensical and nonscientific" and the group has been criticized in the media. Interviewed by Russell Hausfeld from Psymposia, church co-founder Greg Lake said that the church's claims to a novel drug were based solely on "faith". In April 2024, the Church of the Sacred Synthesis sued several of its detractors alleging defamation. One of the lawsuits, against Psymposia, was later dismissed.

== See also ==
- Substituted tryptamine
