= DSP-4 =

Names
- Preferred IUPAC name N-[(2-Bromophenyl)methyl]-2-chloro-N-ethylethan-1-amine

Identifiers
CAS Number	62078-98-2
3D model (JSmol)	Interactive image
ChemSpider	3060
PubChem CID	3172
UNII	PQ1P7JP5C1
CompTox Dashboard (EPA)	DTXSID50211124
- InChI: InChI=1S/C11H15BrClN/c1-2-14(8-7-13)9-10-5-3-4-6-11(10)12/h3-6H,2,7-9H2, 1H3 Key: SDJLVPMBBFRBLL-UHFFFAOYSA-N
- SMILES: CCN(CCCl)CC1=CC=CC=C1Br

Properties
Chemical formula	C_{11}H_{15}BrClN
Molar mass	276.60 g/mol
Density	1.339 g/cm^{3}
- Except where otherwise noted, data are given for materials in their standard state (at 25 °C [77 °F], 100 kPa). Infobox references

For the Super NES enhancement chip see List of Super NES enhancement chips

DSP-4, or N-(2-chloroethyl)-N-ethyl-2-bromobenzylamine, is a monoaminergic neurotoxin selective for noradrenergic neurons, capable of crossing the blood–brain barrier.

It exerts transient effects in peripheral sympathetic neurons, but more permanent changes within neurons of the central nervous system. It can induce long-term depletion in cortical and spinal levels of noradrenaline.

== See also ==
- 5,7-Dihydroxytryptamine
- MPTP
- Oxidopamine
