= 2′-CH3-MPTP =

Dopaminergic neurotoxin

2′-CH_{3}-MPTP

Clinical data
- Other names: 2′-Methyl-MPTP
- Drug class: Dopaminergic neurotoxin

Identifiers
- IUPAC name: 1-methyl-4-(2-methylphenyl)-3,6-dihydro-2H-pyridine
- CAS Number: 102417-86-7
- PubChem CID: 91767
- ChemSpider: 82864
- UNII: HGQ85CV4U5
- ChEMBL: ChEMBL60303
- CompTox Dashboard (EPA): DTXSID70877241

Chemical and physical data
- Formula: C_{13}H_{17}N
- Molar mass: 187.286 g·mol^{−1}
- 3D model (JSmol): Interactive image
- SMILES: CC1=CC=CC=C1C2=CCN(CC2)C
- InChI: InChI=1S/C13H17N/c1-11-5-3-4-6-13(11)12-7-9-14(2)10-8-12/h3-7H,8-10H2,1-2H3; Key:BORHNVHYIYTKKC-UHFFFAOYSA-N

2′-CH_{3}-MPTP, also known as 2′-methyl-MPTP, is a selective dopaminergic neurotoxin related to MPTP which is used in scientific research to lesion dopaminergic neurons. It is a considerably more potent dopaminergic neurotoxin than MPTP in mice but is less potent than MPTP in primates. MPTP and 2′-CH_{3}-MPTP produce a Parkinson's disease-like condition in animals.

2′-CH_{3}-MPTP is metabolized by monoamine oxidase A (MAO-A) and B (MAO-B) and this biotransformation is required for its dopaminergic neurotoxicity. Whereas the dopaminergic neurotoxicity of MPTP is completely prevented by the MAO-B inhibitor selegiline, complete prevention of 2′-CH_{3}-MPTP's dopaminergic neurotoxicity requires combined treatment with both selegiline and the MAO-A inhibitor clorgyline.

A close analogue of 2′-CH_{3}-MPTP is 2′-NH_{2}-MPTP, which, in contrast to 2′-CH_{3}-MPTP and MPTP, is a serotonergic and noradrenergic neurotoxin with no effect on dopaminergic neurons. Numerous other neurotoxic MPTP analogues have also been synthesized.

2′-CH_{3}-MPTP was first described in the scientific literature by 1986.
