= 2′-NH2-MPTP =

Monoaminergic neurotoxin

2′-NH_{2}-MPTP

Clinical data
- Other names: 2′-Amino-MPTP
- Drug class: Serotonergic and noradrenergic neurotoxin

Identifiers
- IUPAC name: 2-(1-methyl-3,6-dihydro-2H-pyridin-4-yl)aniline
- CAS Number: 108114-93-8
- PubChem CID: 130045
- ChemSpider: 115097
- UNII: RFW57MH72Q
- ChEMBL: ChEMBL1188920
- CompTox Dashboard (EPA): DTXSID00148416

Chemical and physical data
- Formula: C_{12}H_{16}N_{2}
- Molar mass: 188.274 g·mol^{−1}
- 3D model (JSmol): Interactive image
- SMILES: CN1CCC(=CC1)C2=CC=CC=C2N
- InChI: InChI=1S/C12H16N2/c1-14-8-6-10(7-9-14)11-4-2-3-5-12(11)13/h2-6H,7-9,13H2,1H3; Key:BRFNXNYQQYJJAQ-UHFFFAOYSA-N

2′-NH_{2}-MPTP, also known as 2′-amino-MPTP, is a monoaminergic neurotoxin that was derived from MPTP and is used in scientific research to lesion brain monoaminergic systems in animals. Whereas MPTP is a selective dopaminergic neurotoxin, 2′-NH_{2}-MPTP is a specific serotonergic and noradrenergic neurotoxin that does not affect dopaminergic neurons. 2′-NH_{2}-MPTP is transported by the serotonin transporter (SERT) into serotonergic neurons and by the norepinephrine transporter (NET) into noradrenergic neurons, and its serotonergic and noradrenergic neurotoxicity is dependent on this transport by the SERT and NET, respectively. 2′-NH_{2}-MPTP was first described in the scientific literature by 1993.

== See also ==
- 2′-CH_{3}-MPTP
