= Xylamine =

Noradrenergic neurotoxin used in scientific research

Clinical data
- Other names: N-2-Chloroethyl-N-ethyl-2-methylbenzylamine

Identifiers
- IUPAC name: 2-chloro-N-ethyl-N-[(2-methylphenyl)methyl]ethanamine
- CAS Number: 78686-02-9
- PubChem CID: 5706
- ChemSpider: 5504
- UNII: 923NT4H8G3
- ChEMBL: ChEMBL1616379
- CompTox Dashboard (EPA): DTXSID10229245

Chemical and physical data
- Formula: C_{12}H_{18}ClN
- Molar mass: 211.73 g·mol^{−1}
- 3D model (JSmol): Interactive image
- SMILES: CCN(CCCl)CC1=CC=CC=C1C
- InChI: InChI=1S/C12H18ClN/c1-3-14(9-8-13)10-12-7-5-4-6-11(12)2/h4-7H,3,8-10H2,1-2H3; Key:XHRCFGDFESIFRG-UHFFFAOYSA-N

Xylamine is a monoaminergic neurotoxin and benzylamine derivative that is closely related to DSP-4. It is a relatively selective noradrenergic neurotoxin, which is attributed to its high affinity for the norepinephrine transporter (NET). DSP-4 is generally preferred over xylamine for use in scientific research and hence xylamine is limitedly employed. Xylamine was first described in 1975.
