= 6,7-Dihydroxytryptamine =

Clinical data
- Other names: 6,7-DHT
- Drug class: Serotonergic neurotoxin

Identifiers
- IUPAC name: 3-(2-aminoethyl)-1H-indole-6,7-diol
- CAS Number: 50584-06-0
- PubChem CID: 39719
- ChemSpider: 36316
- CompTox Dashboard (EPA): DTXSID40964793

Chemical and physical data
- Formula: C_{10}H_{12}N_{2}O_{2}
- Molar mass: 192.218 g·mol^{−1}
- 3D model (JSmol): Interactive image
- SMILES: C1=CC(=C(C2=C1C(=CN2)CCN)O)O
- InChI: InChI=1S/C10H12N2O2/c11-4-3-6-5-12-9-7(6)1-2-8(13)10(9)14/h1-2,5,12-14H,3-4,11H2; Key:JPQILYNPNMIPHV-UHFFFAOYSA-N

6,7-Dihydroxytryptamine (6,7-DHT) is a serotonergic neurotoxin of the tryptamine family. It is structurally related to the monoamine neurotransmitter serotonin (5-hydroxytryptamine; 5-HT).

== See also ==
- Substituted tryptamine
- 4,5-Dihydroxytryptamine (4,5-DHT)
- 5,6-Dihydroxytryptamine (5,6-DHT)
- 5,7-Dihydroxytryptamine (5,7-DHT)
- 4-Hydroxy-5-methoxytryptamine (4-HO-5-MeO-T)
