= Monoamine neurotoxin =

Compounds that damage or destroy monoaminergic neurons

Oxidopamine (6-hydroxydopamine), a selective dopaminergic and noradrenergic neurotoxin.

A monoamine neurotoxin, or monoaminergic neurotoxin, is a drug that selectively damages or destroys monoaminergic neurons. Monoaminergic neurons are neurons that signal via stimulation by monoamine neurotransmitters including serotonin, dopamine, and norepinephrine.

Examples of monoamine neurotoxins include the serotonergic neurotoxins para-chloroamphetamine (PCA), methylenedioxymethamphetamine (MDMA), and 5,7-dihydroxytryptamine (5,7-DHT); the dopaminergic neurotoxins oxidopamine (6-hydroxydopamine), 1-methyl-4-phenyl-1,2,3,6-tetrahydropyridine (MPTP), and methamphetamine; and the noradrenergic neurotoxins oxidopamine and N-(2-chloroethyl)-N-ethyl-2-bromobenzylamine (DSP-4).

In the case of serotonergic neurotoxins like MDMA, research suggests that simultaneous induction of serotonin and dopamine release, serotonin depletion, dopamine uptake and metabolism, hyperthermia, oxidative stress and antioxidant depletion, and/or drug metabolites may all be involved in the neurotoxicity. On the other hand, there is evidence that drug metabolites may not be involved. Some research suggests that serotonergic neurotoxicity might represent neuroadaptive mechanisms rather than neuronal damage per se.

Dopaminergic neurotoxins can induce a Parkinson's disease-like condition in animals and humans. Serotonergic neurotoxins like MDMA have been associated with cognitive and memory deficits and psychiatric changes.

== List of monoamine neurotoxins ==
=== Serotonergic neurotoxins ===
==== Phenethylamines ====
- 2,4-Dichloroamphetamine (2,4-DCA)
- 2,4,5-Trihydroxyamphetamine (2,4,5-THA)
- 2,4,5-Trihydroxymethamphetamine (2,4,5-THMA)
- 3-Chloroamphetamine (3-CA)
- 3,4-Dichloroamphetamine (3,4-DCA)
- 3,4-Dihydroxyamphetamine (HHA; 3,4-DHA; α-methyldopamine; α-Me-DA)
- 3,4-Dihydroxymethamphetamine (HHMA; 3,4-DHMA; α-methylepinine; α,N-dimethyldopamine)
- 3,4-Methylenedioxyamphetamine (MDA)
- 3,4-Methylenedioxyethylamphetamine (MDEA)
- 3,4-Methylenedioxymethamphetamine (MDMA)
- 4-Chlorophenylisobutylamine (4-CAB; 4-chloro-α-desmethyl-α-ethylamphetamine; α-ethyl-PCA)
- 5-MAPB
- Fenfluramine
- Mephedrone
- Methamphetamine
- Methylbenzodioxolylbutanamine (MBDB)
- Methylone
- Norfenfluramine
- para-Bromoamphetamine (PBA; 4-bromoamphetamine; 4-BA)
- para-Bromomethamphetamine (PBMA; 4-bromomethamphetamine; 4-BMA)
- para-Chloroamphetamine (PCA; 4-chloroamphetamine; 4-CA)
- para-Chloromethamphetamine (PCMA; 4-chloromethamphetamine; 4-PCMA)
- para-Iodoamphetamine (PIA; 4-iodoamphetamine; 4-IA)
- para-Methoxyamphetamine (PMA; 4-methylamphetamine; 4-MA)
- para-Methoxy-N-methylamphetamine (PMMA; 4-methyl-N-methylamphetamine; 4-MMA)

==== Tryptamines ====
- 4-Hydroxy-5-methoxytryptamine (4-HO-5-MeO-T)
- 4,5-Dihydroxytryptamine (4,5-DHT)
- 5-MeO-DiPT (5-methoxy-N,N-diisopropyltryptamine)
- 5,6-Dihydroxytryptamine (5,6-DHT)
- 5,7-Dihydroxytryptamine (5,7-DHT)
- 6,7-Dihydroxytryptamine (6,7-DHT)
- α-Ethyltryptamine (αET)

==== 2-Aminoindans ====
- 5-Iodo-2-aminoindane (5-IAI) (weak)
- 5-Methoxy-6-methyl-2-aminoindane (MMAI) (weak; alone and with amphetamine)
- 5,6-Methylenedioxy-2-aminoindane (MDAI) (weak; alone and with amphetamine)
- N-Ethyl-5-trifluoromethyl-2-aminoindane (ETAI)
- 5-Trifluoromethyl-2-aminoindane (TAI)

==== MPTP-related ====
- 2′-NH_{2}-MPTP (2′-amino-MPTP)
- Haloperidol
- HPP^{+} (haloperidol pyridinium)
- HPTP

=== Dopaminergic neurotoxins ===
==== Phenethylamines ====
- 2,4,5-Trihydroxyamphetamine (2,4,5-THA)
- 2,4,5-Trihydroxymethamphetamine (2,4,5-THMA)
- 3,4-Methylenedioxymethamphetamine (MDMA) (in mice but not in humans)
- 4-Methylmethamphetamine (4-MMA; mephedrine)
- 6-Aminodopamine
- 6-Hydroxydopa (6-OH-DOPA, 6-OHDOPA)
- 6-Hydroxydopamine quinone (6-OHDA quinone; oxidopamine quinone)
- Amphetamine
- Mephedrone
- Methamphetamine
- Methcathinone
- Methylone
- Oxidopamine (6-hydroxydopamine; 6-OHDA)

===== Dopamine and metabolites =====
- 3,4-Dihydroxyphenylacetaldehyde (DOPAL; dopamine aldehyde)
- 5-S-Cysteinyldopamine (5-S-CyS-DA)
- DOPA quinone
- DOPAL quinone
- Dopamine
- Dopamine quinone
- N-Methylnorsalsolinol
- Norsalsolinol
- Salsolinol

==== Tryptamines ====
- 5,6-Dihydroxytryptamine (5,6-DHT)
- 6,7-Dihydroxytryptamine (6,7-DHT)
- 1-Trichloromethyl-1,2,3,4-tetrahydro-β-carboline (TaClo; 1-TCMTC)

==== MPTP-related ====
- 2′-CH_{3}-MPTP (2′-methyl-MPTP)
- Haloperidol
- HPP^{+} (haloperidol pyridinium)
- HPTP
- MPP^{+} (cyperquat)
- MPTP

==== Pesticides ====
- Benomyl
- Daidzin
- Dieldrin
- Fenpropathrin
- Mancozeb
- Maneb
- Paraquat
- Rotenone
- Ziram

==== Others ====
- Aldehyde dehydrogenase (ALDH) inhibitors (e.g., disulfiram, methylmercury)
- Imidazole propionate (ImP)

=== Noradrenergic neurotoxins ===
==== Phenethylamines and related ====
- 2,4,5-Trihydroxyamphetamine (2,4,5-THA)
- 3,4-Methylenedioxyamphetamine (MDA)
- 3,4-Dihydroxyphenylglycolaldehyde (DOPEGAL; norepinephrine/epinephrine aldehyde)
- 6-Aminodopamine
- 6-Hydroxydopa (6-OH-DOPA, 6-OHDOPA)
- DSP-4
- Oxidopamine (6-hydroxydopamine; 6-OHDA)
- Xylamine

==== Tryptamines and related ====
- 4,5-Dihydroxytryptamine (4,5-DHT)
- 5,6-Dihydroxytryptamine (5,6-DHT)
- 5,7-Dihydroxytryptamine (5,7-DHT)

==== MPTP-related ====
- 2′-NH_{2}-MPTP (2′-amino-MPTP)

=== Unsorted or unknown ===
- 2,5-DDM-DOM
- 5-Hydroxyindoleacetaldehyde (5-HIAL)
- RHPP^{+}
- RHPTP

== See also ==
- Monoamine-depleting agent
