= 6-Aminodopamine =

Names
- Other names: 6-ADA; ADA; Aminodopamine

Identifiers
CAS Number	38411-80-2
3D model (JSmol)	Interactive image
ChEMBL	ChEMBL31384
PubChem CID	170045
UNII	WPB78B2U2K
CompTox Dashboard (EPA)	DTXSID50191750
- InChI: InChI=1S/C8H12N2O2/c9-2-1-5-3-7(11)8(12)4-6(5)10/h3-4,11-12H,1-2,9-10H2 Key: JOMLIKNXFZFNRZ-UHFFFAOYSA-N
- SMILES: C1=C(C(=CC(=C1O)O)N)CCN

Properties
Chemical formula	C_{8}H_{12}N_{2}O_{2}
Molar mass	168.196 g·mol^{−1}
- Except where otherwise noted, data are given for materials in their standard state (at 25 °C [77 °F], 100 kPa). Infobox references

6-Aminodopamine is a catecholaminergic neurotoxin, functioning as both a dopaminergic and noradrenergic neurotoxin, or simply referred to as a monoaminergic neurotoxin. It is an aminophenol, or specifically, a substituted phenethylamine. Its structure consists of dopamine (3,4-dihydroxyphenethylamine) with a free amino group substituted at position 6 of the benzene ring. In comparison, the 'reference' monoaminergic neurotoxin, 6-hydroxydopamine, which has a hydroxyl group substituted at the 6-position, exhibits toxicity roughly comparable to that of 6-aminodopamine.

== Chemistry ==
6-Aminodopamine and 6-hydroxydopamine (6-ADA and 6-OHDA) are relatively unstable compounds; both compounds rapidly and swiftly undergo auto-oxidation to form mainly toxic metabolites.

The image above illustrates the structures in a clockwise direction (starting from the top right corner): 2,4,5-trihydroxyamphetamine, 3,4-dihydroxy-6-aminoamphetamine, 6-aminodopamine, and 6-hydroxydopamine.

== Formation ==
The introduction of strong electron-donating substituents into the 6-position of the benzene ring (a hydroxyl group (OH) in 6-OHDA or an amino group (NH_{2}) in 6-ADA) sharply increases the electron density of the aromatic system. Both compounds generate identical byproducts, such as superoxide and hydrogen peroxide, which further form hydroxyl radicals; quinones, such as 6-aminodopamine-para-quinone (6-NH_{2}DAQ), are perhaps the most toxic compounds. However, aminochromes (5,6-dihydroxyindoles and similar compounds) formed from 6-NH2DAQ are also effective neurotoxins.

== Toxicology ==
=== Toxicodynamics ===
6-Aminodopamine acts as a toxic compound targeting the catecholamine system, primarily reducing norepinephrine content and impairing its accumulation, alongside that of dopamine. It induced a decrease in endogenous myocardial norepinephrine content, diminished the ability of heart slices to accumulate norepinephrine in vitro, and led to the near-complete disappearance of the adrenergic plexus in the mouse iris. These findings indicate that 6-aminodopamine causes the destruction of sympathetic nerve endings in vivo. Similar to 6-hydroxydopamine, 6-aminodopamine also blocked dopamine accumulation in rat brain slices, a mechanism suggested to be mediated by its byproducts or quinones. Other animal studies have confirmed a reduction of norepinephrine levels in the cerebral cortex, whereas dopamine levels were depleted in the subcortical nuclei. In a separate mouse study, the compound was administered intracerebrally at a dose of 75–150 μg over 3 days to induce sympathectomy and compare its potency with 6-OHDA. This neurotoxic effect is irreversible, with the lesion persisting even after 30 days. Notably, 6-aminodopamine exhibited no serotonin-depleting properties and did not affect serotonin levels.

Intracerebroventricular administration of 6-aminodopamine to rats led to a significant decrease in endogenous norepinephrine and its uptake in cerebral cortex and hypothalamus slices. Similar but less pronounced effects were observed in dopamine neurons within the caudate nucleus. A marked accumulation of dopamine was observed in the axons of catecholamine neurons. Studies suggest that 6-aminodopamine potentially exceeds 6-hydroxydopamine in overall toxicity; indeed, it induced irreversible chemical blockade of the active site of the catechol-O-methyltransferase enzyme via its toxic quinone metabolite and aminochromes, caused by the alkylation of an amino acid residue in the active site of COMT.

== See also ==
- 6-Hydroxydopamine (oxidopamine, 6-OHDA)
- Catecholamines (such as dopamine and norepinephrine)
- Monoaminergic neurotoxins
