= 5-Methylpsilocybin =

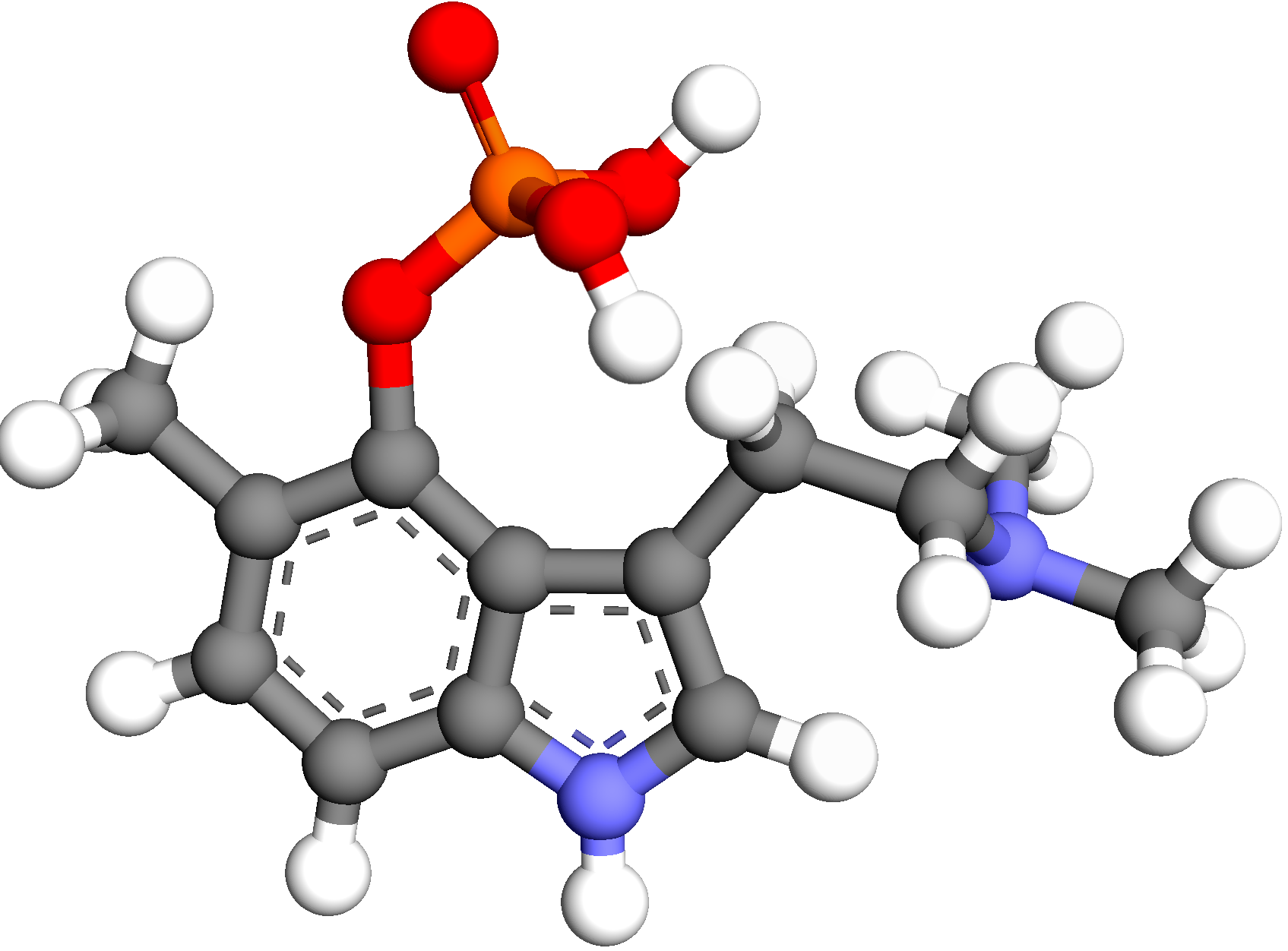

Clinical data
- Other names: 5-Methyl-4-phosphoryloxy-N,N-dimethyltryptamine; 5-Me-4-PO-DMT
- Drug class: Serotonergic psychedelic; Hallucinogen; Serotonin receptor agonist; Serotonin 5-HT2A receptor agonist
- ATC code: None

Legal status
- Legal status: Generally not controlled

Identifiers
- IUPAC name: 3-[2-(dimethylamino)ethyl]-5-methyl-1H-indol-4-yl dihydrogen phosphate
- PubChem CID: 170690552
- ChemSpider: 129466028
- ChEMBL: ChEMBL5280975

Chemical and physical data
- Formula: C_{13}H_{19}N_{2}O_{4}P
- Molar mass: 298.279 g·mol^{−1}
- 3D model (JSmol): Interactive image
- SMILES: CC1=C(C2=C(C=C1)NC=C2CCN(C)C)OP(=O)(O)O
- InChI: InChI=1S/C13H19N2O4P/c1-9-4-5-11-12(13(9)19-20(16,17)18)10(8-14-11)6-7-15(2)3/h4-5,8,14H,6-7H2,1-3H3,(H2,16,17,18); Key:YEFXMKVFABOOBT-UHFFFAOYSA-N

5-Methylpsilocybin is a psychedelic drug, a synthetic analogue of psilocybin, which has high serotonergic activity. It produces the head-twitch response, a behavioral proxy of psychedelic effects, in rodents.

== Chemistry ==
=== Synthesis ===
5-Methylpsilocybin can be synthesized by enzymatic phosphorylation of its synthetic precursor, 5-methylpsilocin, using the enzyme 4-hydroxytryptamine kinase purified from Psilocybe cubensis.

== See also ==
- Substituted tryptamine
- 5-Methoxypsilocybin
