= FAUC50 =

Names
- Preferred IUPAC name 5-[(1R)-2-{[2-(4-{3-[(2-Aminoethyl)disulfanyl]propoxy}-3-methoxyphenyl)ethyl]amino}-1-hydroxyethyl]-8-hydroxyquinolin-2(1H)-one

Identifiers
CAS Number	1273593-86-4
3D model (JSmol)	Interactive image
ChemSpider	88297722
PubChem CID	102262218
UNII	CE67FN5E7V
CompTox Dashboard (EPA)	DTXSID101104232
- InChI: InChI=1S/C25H33N3O5S2/c1-32-23-15-17(3-7-22(23)33-12-2-13-34-35-14-10-26)9-11-27-16-21(30)18-4-6-20(29)25-19(18)5-8-24(31)28-25/h3-8,15,21,27,29-30H,2,9-14,16,26H2,1H3,(H,28,31)/t21-/m0/s1 Key: MQROXSOVKCABJV-NRFANRHFSA-N
- SMILES: O=C1NC2=C(C([C@@H](O)CNCCC3=CC=C(OCCCSSCCN)C(OC)=C3)=CC=C2O)C=C1

Properties
Chemical formula	C_{25}H_{33}N_{3}O_{5}S_{2}
Molar mass	519.67 g·mol^{−1}
- Except where otherwise noted, data are given for materials in their standard state (at 25 °C [77 °F], 100 kPa). Infobox references

FAUC50 is a covalent agonist that was used to obtain a bound structure of the β_{2} adrenoceptor, by designing a mutant form of the receptor with an amino acid residue that would react with it. It has been used as a template for covalent agonists of other receptors, and to obtain structures.
