= MPP+ =

MPP^{+}

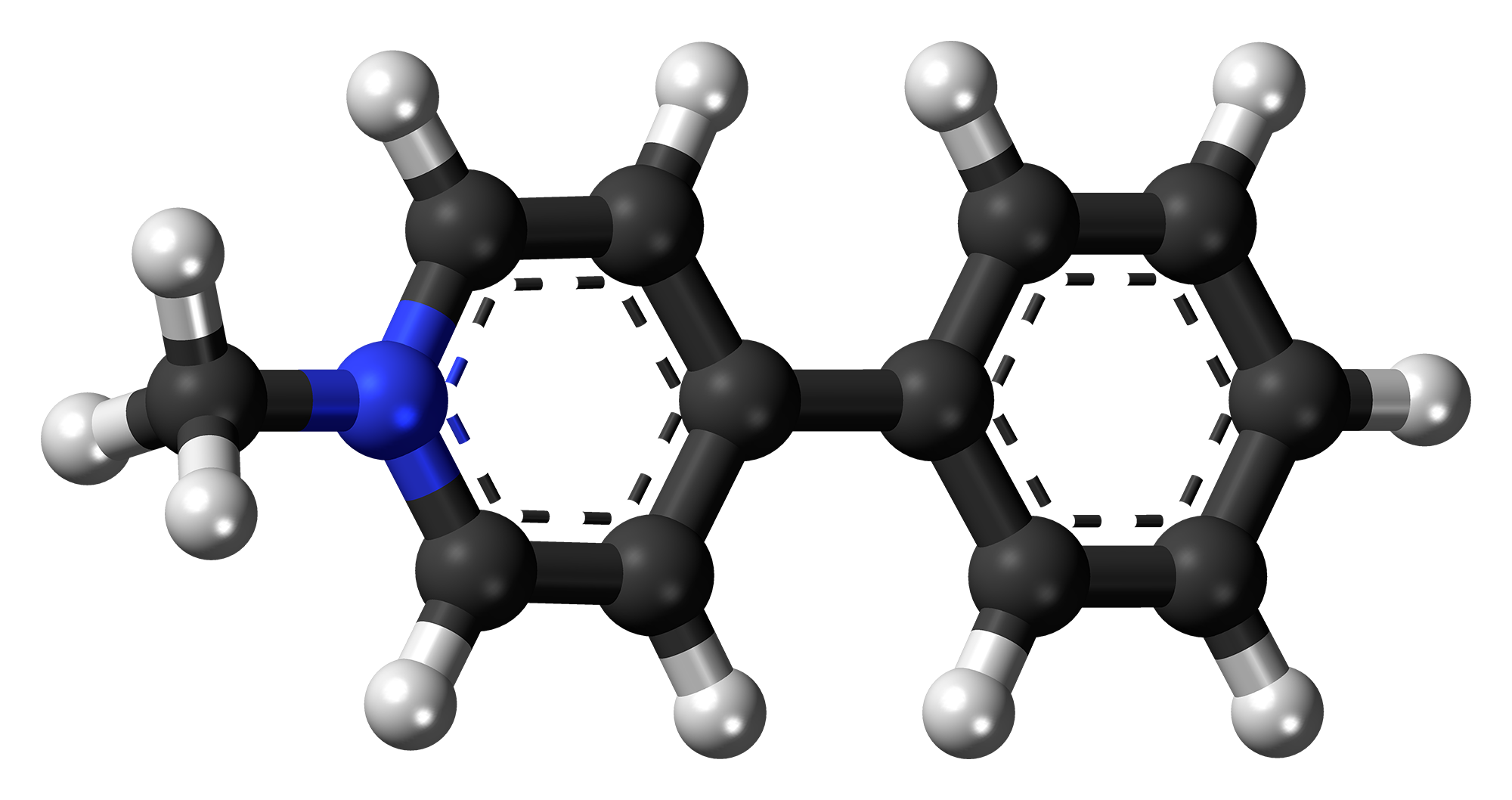

Names
- Preferred IUPAC name 1-Methyl-4-phenylpyridin-1-ium
- Other names: Cyperquat; 1-Methyl-4-phenylpyridinium; N-Methyl-4-phenylpyridine

Identifiers
CAS Number	39794-99-5
3D model (JSmol)	Interactive image
ChEBI	CHEBI:641
ChEMBL	ChEMBL311617
ChemSpider	36101
EC Number	248-939-7
IUPHAR/BPS	4568
MeSH	1-Methyl-4-phenylpyridinium
PubChem CID	39484
UNII	MRP3DNB9K9
CompTox Dashboard (EPA)	DTXSID4058106
- InChI: InChI=1S/C12H12N/c1-13-9-7-12(8-10-13)11-5-3-2-4-6-11/h2-10H,1H3/q+1 Key: FMGYKKMPNATWHP-UHFFFAOYSA-N
- SMILES: C[n+]1ccc(cc1)c2ccccc2

Properties
Chemical formula	C_{12}H_{12}N^{+}
Molar mass	170.25 g/mol
Appearance	White to beige powder
Solubility in water	10 mg/mL
- Except where otherwise noted, data are given for materials in their standard state (at 25 °C [77 °F], 100 kPa). verify (what is ?) Infobox references

MPP^{+} (1-methyl-4-phenylpyridinium) or cyperquat is a positively charged organic molecule with the chemical formula C_{12}H_{12}N^{+}. It is a monoaminergic neurotoxin that acts by interfering with oxidative phosphorylation in mitochondria by inhibiting complex I, leading to the depletion of ATP and eventual cell death.

MPP^{+} arises in the body as the toxic metabolite of the closely related compound MPTP. MPTP is converted in the brain into MPP^{+} by the enzyme MAO-B, ultimately causing parkinsonism in primates by killing certain dopamine-producing neurons in the substantia nigra. The ability for MPP^{+} to induce Parkinson's disease has made it an important compound in Parkinson's research since this property was discovered in 1983.

The chloride salt of MPP^{+} found use in the 1970s as an herbicide under the common name cyperquat. Though no longer in use as an herbicide, cyperquat's closely related structural analog paraquat still finds widespread usage, raising a number of health and safety concerns.

== History ==
MPP^{+} has been known since at least the 1920s, with a synthesis of the compound being published in a German chemistry journal in 1923. Its neurotoxic effects, however, were not known until much later, with the first paper definitively identifying MPP^{+} as a Parkinson's-inducing poison being published in 1983. This paper followed a string of poisonings that took place in San Jose, California in 1982 in which users of an illicitly synthesized analog of meperidine were presenting to hospital emergency rooms with symptoms of Parkinson's. Since most of the patients were young and otherwise healthy and Parkinson's disease tends to afflict people at a much older age, researchers at the hospital began to scrutinize the illicitly synthesized opiates that the patients had ingested. The researchers discovered that the opiates were tainted with MPTP, which is the biological precursor to the neurotoxic MPP^{+}. The MPTP was present in the illicitly synthesized meperidine analog as an impurity, which had a precedent in a 1976 case involving a chemistry graduate student synthesizing meperidine and injecting the resulting product into himself. The student came down with symptoms of Parkinson's disease, and his synthesized product was found to be heavily contaminated with MPTP.

The discovery that MPP^{+} could reliably and irreversibly induce Parkinson's disease in mammals reignited interest in Parkinson's research, which had previously been dormant for decades. Following the revelation, MPP^{+} and MPTP sold out in virtually all chemical catalogs, reappearing months later with a 100-fold price increase.

== Synthesis ==
=== Laboratory ===
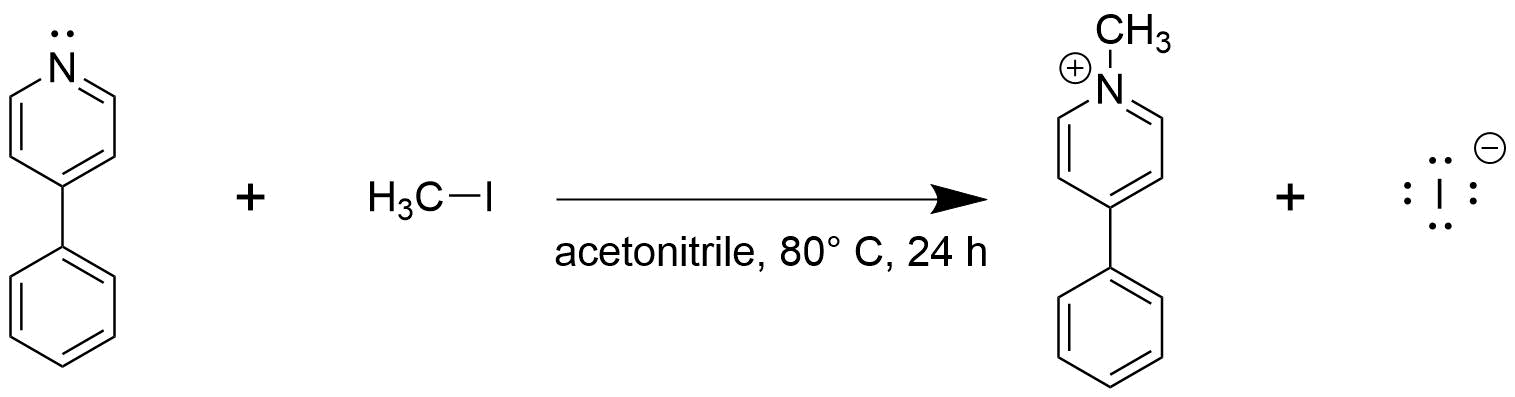
Reaction scheme for the laboratory synthesis of MPP^{+}.

MPP^{+} can be readily synthesized in the laboratory, with Zhang and colleagues publishing a representative synthesis in 2017. The synthesis involves reacting 4-phenylpyridine with methyl iodide in hot acetonitrile for 24 hours. An inert atmosphere is used to ensure a quantitative yield. The product is formed as the iodide salt, and the reaction proceeds via an S_{N}2 pathway. The herbicide cyperquat (MPP chloride) can be made in the same manner by using methyl chloride instead of methyl iodide.

=== Biological ===
MPP^{+} is produced in vivo from the precursor MPTP. The process involves two successive oxidations of the molecule by monoamine oxidase B to form the final MPP^{+} product. This metabolic process occurs predominantly in astrocytes in the brain.

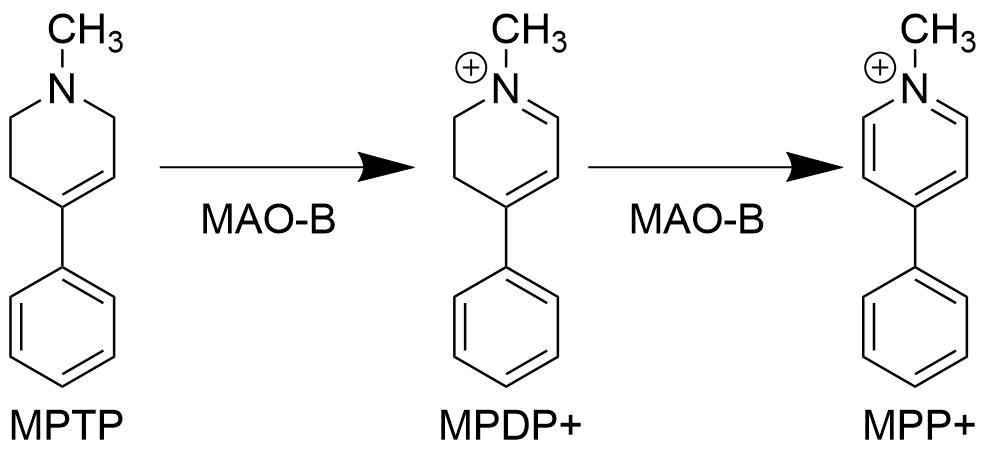
Metabolism of MPTP to MPP^{+} in cerebral astrocytes.

== Mechanism of toxicity ==
MPP^{+} exhibits its toxicity mainly by promoting the formation of reactive free radicals in the mitochondria of dopaminergic neurons in the substantia nigra. MPP^{+} can siphon electrons from the mitochondrial electron transport chain at complex I and be reduced, in the process forming radical reactive oxygen species which go on to cause further, generalized cellular damage. In addition, the overall inhibition of the electron transport chain eventually leads to stunted ATP production and eventual death of the dopaminergic neurons, which ultimately displays itself clinically as symptoms of Parkinson's disease.

MPP^{+} also displays toxicity by inhibiting the synthesis of catecholamines, reducing levels of dopamine and cardiac norepinephrine, and inactivating tyrosine hydroxylase.

The mechanism of uptake of MPP^{+} is important to its toxicity. MPP^{+} injected as an aqueous solution into the bloodstream causes no symptoms of Parkinsonism in test subjects, since the highly charged molecule is unable to diffuse through the blood-brain barrier. Furthermore, MPP^{+} shows little toxicity to cells other than dopaminergic neurons, suggesting that these neurons have a unique process by which they can uptake the molecule, since, being charged, MPP^{+} cannot readily diffuse across the lipid bilayer that composes cellular membranes.

Unlike MPP^{+}, its common biological precursor MPTP is a lipid-soluble molecule that diffuses readily across the blood-brain barrier. MPTP itself is not cytotoxic, however, and must be metabolized to MPP^{+} by MAO-B to show any signs of toxicity. The oxidation of MPTP to MPP^{+} is a process that can be catalyzed only by MAO-B, and cells that express other forms of MAO do not show any MPP^{+} production. Studies in which MAO-B was selectively inhibited showed that MPTP had no toxic effect, further cementing the crucial role of MAO-B in MPTP and MPP^{+} toxicity.

Studies in rats and mice show that various compounds, including nobiletin, a flavonoid found in citrus, can rescue dopaminergic neurons from degeneration caused by treatment with MPP^{+}. The specific mechanism of protection, however, remains unknown.

== Uses ==
=== In scientific research ===
MPP^{+} and its precursor MPTP are widely used in animal models of Parkinson's disease to irreversibly induce the disease. Excellent selectivity and dose control can be achieved by injecting the compound directly into cell types of interest. Most modern studies use rats as a model system, and much research is directed at identifying compounds that can attenuate or reverse the effects of MPP^{+}. Commonly studied compounds include various MAO inhibitors and general antioxidants. While some of these compounds are quite effective at stopping the neurotoxic effects of MPP^{+}, further research is needed to establish their potential efficacy in treating clinical Parkinson's.

The revelation that MPP^{+} causes the death of dopaminergic neurons and ultimately induces symptoms of Parkinson's disease was crucial in establishing the lack of dopamine as central to Parkinson's disease. Levodopa or L-DOPA came into common use as an anti-Parkinson's medication thanks to the results brought about by research using MPP^{+}. Further medications are in trial to treat the progression of the disease itself as well as the motor and non-motor symptoms associated with Parkinson's, with MPP^{+} still being widely used in early trials to test efficacy.

=== As a pesticide ===
Paraquat, an herbicide structurally similar to cyperquat, is still widely used in agriculture. The molecule is depicted here as the chloride salt.

MPP^{+}, sold as the chloride salt under the common name cyperquat, was used briefly in the 1970s as an herbicide to protect crops against nutsedge, a member of the cyperus genus of plants. MPP^{+} as a salt has much lower acute toxicity than its precursor MPTP due to the inability of the former to pass through the blood-brain barrier and ultimately access the only cells that will permit its uptake, the dopaminergic neurons. While cyperquat is no longer used as an herbicide, a closely related compound named paraquat is. Given the structural similarities, some have raised concerns about paraquat's active use as an herbicide for those handling it. However, studies have shown paraquat to be far less neurotoxic than MPP^{+}, since paraquat does not bind to complex I in the mitochondrial electron transport chain, and thus its toxic effects cannot be realized.

The HRAC resistance classification puts cyperquat in Group L (Aus), Group D (global), Group 22 (numeric).

== Safety ==
MPP^{+} is commonly sold as the water-soluble iodide salt and is a white-to-beige powder. Specific toxicological data on the compound is somewhat lacking, but one MSDS quotes an LD_{50} of 29 mg/kg via an intraperitoneal route and 22.3 mg/kg via a subcutaneous route of exposure. Both values come from a mouse model system.

MPP^{+} encountered in the salt form is far less toxic by ingestion, inhalation, and skin exposure than its biological precursor MPTP, due to the inability of MPP^{+} to cross the blood-brain barrier and freely diffuse across cellular membranes.

There is no specific antidote to MPP^{+} poisoning. Clinicians are advised to treat exposure symptomatically.
