= 5,6-Dihydroxytryptamine =

Serotonergic neurotoxin

Clinical data
- Other names: 5,6-DHT

Identifiers
- IUPAC name: 3-(2-aminoethyl)-1H-indole-5,6-diol
- CAS Number: 5090-36-8
- PubChem CID: 21163
- ChemSpider: 19902
- UNII: W2QY253O8S
- ChEMBL: ChEMBL303916
- CompTox Dashboard (EPA): DTXSID40198930
- ECHA InfoCard: 100.023.464

Chemical and physical data
- Formula: C_{10}H_{12}N_{2}O_{2}
- Molar mass: 192.218 g·mol^{−1}
- 3D model (JSmol): Interactive image
- SMILES: C1=C2C(=CC(=C1O)O)NC=C2CCN
- InChI: InChI=1S/C10H12N2O2/c11-2-1-6-5-12-8-4-10(14)9(13)3-7(6)8/h3-5,12-14H,1-2,11H2; Key:SKOKLDQYOKPCPU-UHFFFAOYSA-N

5,6-Dihydroxytryptamine (5,6-DHT) is a monoaminergic neurotoxin and tryptamine derivative related to serotonin (5-hydroxytryptamine) and 5,7-dihydroxytryptamine (5,7-DHT). It is a relatively selective serotonergic neurotoxin, but also acts as a dopaminergic and noradrenergic neurotoxin at higher doses. In addition, it produces widespread generalized toxicity at higher doses. Its selective serotonergic neurotoxicity is due to its high affinity for the serotonin transporter (SERT). Because of its SERT affinity, 5,6-DHT has activity as a serotonin reuptake inhibitor.

The compound can be used in scientific research to lesion the brain serotonergic system in animals. It has a number of limitations and disadvantages relative to 5,7-DHT however, which have made 5,7-DHT a more preferred serotonergic neurotoxin in scientific research. Administration of 5,6-DHT (and 5,7-DHT) to animals causes dramatic behavioral changes.

5,6-DHT was first described in the scientific literature by 1971.

== See also ==
- 4,5-Dihydroxytryptamine
- 6,7-Dihydroxytryptamine
- 4-Hydroxy-5-methoxytryptamine
