= Neurotoxicity =

Toxic effects on the nervous system

Neurotoxicity is a form of toxicity in which a biological, chemical, or physical agent produces an adverse effect on the structure or function of the central and/or peripheral nervous system. It occurs when exposure to a substance – specifically, a neurotoxin or neurotoxicant– alters the normal activity of the nervous system in such a way as to cause permanent or reversible damage to nervous tissue. This can eventually disrupt or even kill neurons, which are cells that transmit and process signals in the brain and other parts of the nervous system. Neurotoxicity can result from organ transplants, radiation treatment, certain drug therapies, recreational drug use, exposure to heavy metals, bites from certain species of venomous snakes, pesticides, certain industrial cleaning solvents, fuels and certain naturally occurring substances. Symptoms may appear immediately after exposure or be delayed. They may include limb weakness or numbness, loss of memory, vision, and/or intellect, uncontrollable obsessive and/or compulsive behaviors, delusions, headache, cognitive and behavioral problems and sexual dysfunction. Chronic mold exposure in homes can lead to neurotoxicity which may not appear for months to years of exposure. All symptoms listed above are consistent with mold mycotoxin accumulation.

The term neurotoxicity implies the involvement of a neurotoxin; however, the term neurotoxic may be used more loosely to describe states that are known to cause physical brain damage, but where no specific neurotoxin has been identified.

The presence of neurocognitive deficits alone is not usually considered sufficient evidence of neurotoxicity, as many substances may impair neurocognitive performance without resulting in the death of neurons. This may be due to the direct action of the substance, with the impairment and neurocognitive deficits being temporary, and resolving when the substance is eliminated from the body. In some cases the level or exposure-time may be critical, with some substances only becoming neurotoxic in certain doses or time periods. Some of the most common naturally occurring brain toxins that lead to neurotoxicity as a result of long term drug use are amyloid beta (Aβ), glutamate, dopamine, and oxygen radicals. When present in high concentrations, they can lead to neurotoxicity and death (apoptosis). Some of the symptoms that result from cell death include loss of motor control, cognitive deterioration and autonomic nervous system dysfunction. Additionally, neurotoxicity has been found to be a major cause of neurodegenerative diseases such as Alzheimer's disease (AD).

== Neurotoxic agents ==
=== Amyloid beta ===
Amyloid beta (Aβ) was found to cause neurotoxicity and cell death in the brain when present in high concentrations. Aβ results from a mutation that occurs when protein chains are cut at the wrong locations, resulting in chains of different lengths that are unusable. Thus they are left in the brain until they are broken down, but if enough accumulate, they form plaques which are toxic to neurons. Aβ uses several routes in the central nervous system to cause cell death. An example is through the nicotinic acetylcholine receptor (nAchRs), which is a receptor commonly found along the surfaces of the cells that respond to nicotine stimulation, turning them on or off. Aβ was found manipulating the level of nicotine in the brain along with the MAP kinase, another signaling receptor, to cause cell death. Another chemical in the brain that Aβ regulates is JNK; this chemical halts the extracellular signal-regulated kinases (ERK) pathway, which normally functions as memory control in the brain. As a result, this memory favoring pathway is stopped, and the brain loses essential memory function. The loss of memory is a symptom of neurodegenerative disease, including AD. Another way Aβ causes cell death is through the phosphorylation of AKT; this occurs as the phosphate group is bound to several sites on the protein. This phosphorylation allows AKT to interact with BAD, a protein known to cause cell death. Thus an increase in Aβ results in an increase of the AKT/BAD complex, in turn stopping the action of the anti-apoptotic protein Bcl-2, which normally functions to stop cell death, causing accelerated neuron breakdown and the progression of AD.

=== Glutamate ===
Glutamate is a chemical found in the brain that poses a toxic threat to neurons when found in high concentrations. This concentration equilibrium is extremely delicate and is usually found in millimolar amounts extracellularly. When disturbed, an accumulation of glutamate occurs as a result of a mutation in the glutamate transporters, which act like pumps to clear glutamate from the synapse. This causes glutamate concentration to be several times higher in the blood than in the brain; in turn, the body must act to maintain equilibrium between the two concentrations by pumping the glutamate out of the bloodstream and into the neurons of the brain. In the event of a mutation, the glutamate transporters are unable to pump the glutamate back into the cells; thus a higher concentration accumulates at the glutamate receptors. This opens the ion channels, allowing calcium to enter the cell causing excitotoxicity. Glutamate results in cell death by turning on the N-methyl-D-aspartic acid receptors (NMDA); these receptors cause an increased release of calcium ions (Ca^{2+}) into the cells. As a result, the increased concentration of Ca^{2+} directly increases the stress on mitochondria, resulting in excessive oxidative phosphorylation and production of reactive oxygen species (ROS) via the activation of nitric oxide synthase, ultimately leading to cell death. Aβ was also found aiding this route to neurotoxicity by enhancing neuron vulnerability to glutamate.

=== Oxygen radicals ===
The formation of oxygen radicals in the brain is achieved through the nitric oxide synthase (NOS) pathway. This reaction occurs as a response to an increase in the Ca^{2+} concentration inside a brain cell. This interaction between the Ca^{2+} and NOS results in the formation of the cofactor tetrahydrobiopterin (BH4), which then moves from the plasma membrane into the cytoplasm. As a final step, NOS is dephosphorylated yielding nitric oxide (NO), which accumulates in the brain, increasing its oxidative stress. There are several ROS, including superoxide, hydrogen peroxide and hydroxyl, all of which lead to neurotoxicity. Naturally, the body utilizes a defensive mechanism to diminish the fatal effects of the reactive species by employing certain enzymes to break down the ROS into small, benign molecules of simple oxygen and water. However, this breakdown of the ROS is not completely efficient; some reactive residues are left in the brain to accumulate, contributing to neurotoxicity and cell death. The brain is more vulnerable to oxidative stress than other organs, due to its low oxidative capacity. Because neurons are characterized as postmitotic cells, meaning that they live with accumulated damage over the years, accumulation of ROS is fatal. Thus, increased levels of ROS age neurons, which leads to accelerated neurodegenerative processes and ultimately the advancement of AD.

=== Dopaminergic Neurotoxicity ===
==== Endogenous ====
The endogenously produced autotoxin metabolite of dopamine, 3,4-Dihydroxyphenylacetaldehyde (DOPAL), is a potent inducer of programmed cell death (apoptosis) in dopaminergic neurons. DOPAL may play an important role in the pathology of Parkinson's disease.

==== Drug induced ====
Certain drugs, most famously the pesticide and metabolite MPP+ (1-methyl-4-phenylpyridin-1-ium) can induce Parkinson's disease by destroying dopaminergic neurons in the substantia nigra. MPP+ interacts with the electron transport chain in the mitochondria to generate reactive oxygen species which cause generalized oxidative damage and ultimately cell death. MPP+ is produced by monoamine oxidase B as a metabolite of MPTP (1-methyl-4-phenyl-1,2,3,6-tetrahydropyridine), and its toxicity is particularly significant to dopaminergic neurons because of an active transporter on those cells that bring it into the cytoplasm. The neurotoxicity of MPP+ was first investigated after MPTP was produced as a contaminant in the MPPP a Pethidine analog synthesized by a chemistry graduate student, who injected the contaminated drug and developed overt Parkinson's within weeks. Discovery of the mechanism of toxicity was an important advance in the study of Parkinson's disease, and the compound is now used to induce the disease in research animals.

== Prognosis ==
The prognosis depends upon the length and degree of exposure and the severity of neurological injury. In some instances, exposure to neurotoxins or neurotoxicants can be fatal. In others, patients may survive but not fully recover. In other situations, many individuals recover completely after treatment.

The word neurotoxicity (/ˌnʊəroʊtɒkˈsɪsɪti/) uses combining forms of neuro- + tox- + -icity, yielding "nervous tissue poisoning".

== See also ==
- Batrachotoxin
- Cytotoxicity
- Multiple chemical sensitivity
- Nephrotoxicity
- Ototoxicity
- Penitrem A
- Excitotoxicity
- Toxicity
