= 4-Hydroxy-5-methoxytryptamine =

Clinical data
- Other names: 4-HO-5-MeO-T; 5-MeO-4-HT
- Drug class: Serotonergic neurotoxin

Identifiers
- IUPAC name: 3-(2-aminoethyl)-5-methoxy-1H-indol-4-ol
- PubChem CID: 84076774
- ChemSpider: 45633071

Chemical and physical data
- Formula: C_{11}H_{14}N_{2}O_{2}
- Molar mass: 206.245 g·mol^{−1}
- 3D model (JSmol): Interactive image
- SMILES: COC1=C(C2=C(C=C1)NC=C2CCN)O
- InChI: InChI=1S/C11H14N2O2/c1-15-9-3-2-8-10(11(9)14)7(4-5-12)6-13-8/h2-3,6,13-14H,4-5,12H2,1H3; Key:OPLJHPODCQWRFI-UHFFFAOYSA-N

4-Hydroxy-5-methoxytryptamine (4-HO-5-MeO-T) is a serotonergic neurotoxin of the tryptamine family. It is structurally related to the monoamine neurotransmitter serotonin (5-hydroxytryptamine; 5-HT). The drug is also a monoamine reuptake inhibitor. Its analogue 4,5-dihydroxytryptamine (4,5-DHT) is also a serotonergic neurotoxin. Rapid auto-oxidation of 4-HO-5-MeO-T and 4,5-DHT prevents them from being used as serotonergic neurotoxins in scientific research.

== See also ==
- Substituted tryptamine
- 5,6-Dihydroxytryptamine (5,6-DHT)
- 5,7-Dihydroxytryptamine (5,7-DHT)
- Psilomethoxin (4-HO-5-MeO-N,N-DMT)
- 6,7-Dihydroxytryptamine (6,7-DHT)
