= MPTP =

Tetrahydropyridine, a chemical causing Parkinson's disease symptoms

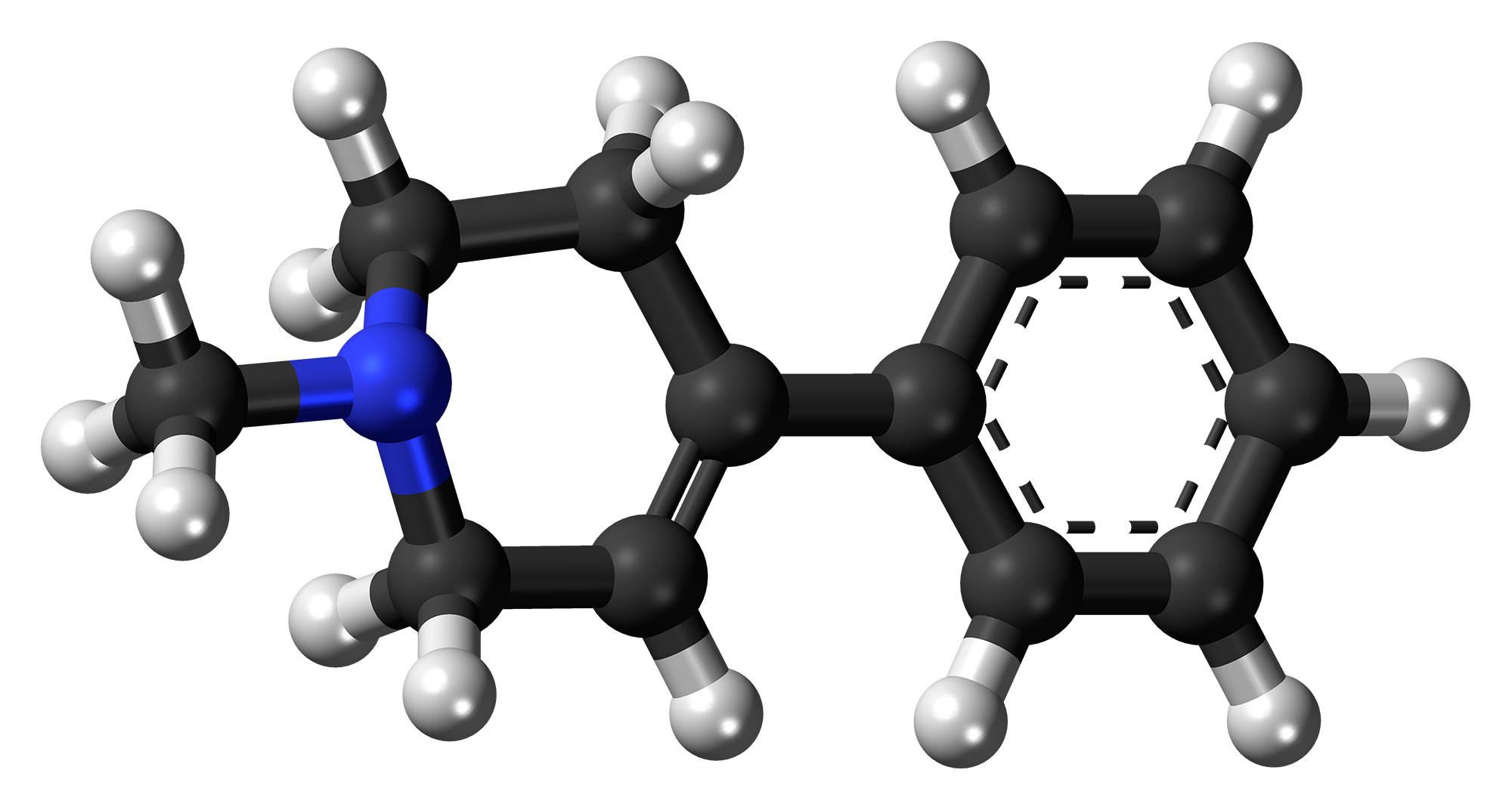

Names
- Preferred IUPAC name 1-Methyl-4-phenyl-1,2,3,6-tetrahydropyridine

Identifiers
CAS Number	28289-54-5
3D model (JSmol)	Interactive image
ChEBI	CHEBI:17963
ChEMBL	ChEMBL24172
ChemSpider	1346
ECHA InfoCard	100.044.475
EC Number	248-939-7
IUPHAR/BPS	280
KEGG	C04599
MeSH	1-Methyl-4-phenyl-1,2,3,6-tetrahydropyridine
PubChem CID	1388
UNII	9P21XSP91P
CompTox Dashboard (EPA)	DTXSID8040933
- InChI: InChI=1S/C12H15N/c1-13-9-7-12(8-10-13)11-5-3-2-4-6-11/h2-7H,8-10H2,1H3 Key: PLRACCBDVIHHLZ-UHFFFAOYSA-N; InChI=1/C12H15N/c1-13-9-7-12(8-10-13)11-5-3-2-4-6-11/h2-7H,8-10H2,1H3 Key: PLRACCBDVIHHLZ-UHFFFAOYAV
- SMILES: c2ccccc2/C1=C/CN(C)CC1

Properties
Chemical formula	C_{12}H_{15}N
Molar mass	173.259 g·mol^{−1}
Melting point	40 °C (104 °F; 313 K)
Boiling point	128 to 132 °C (262 to 270 °F; 401 to 405 K) 12 Torr
Solubility in water	Slightly soluble

Hazards
NFPA 704 (fire diamond)	4 0 0
- Except where otherwise noted, data are given for materials in their standard state (at 25 °C [77 °F], 100 kPa). verify (what is ?) Infobox references

MPTP (1-methyl-4-phenyl-1,2,3,6-tetrahydropyridine) is an organic compound. It is classified as a tetrahydropyridine. It is of interest as a precursor to the monoaminergic neurotoxin MPP^{+}, which causes permanent symptoms of Parkinson's disease by destroying dopaminergic neurons in the substantia nigra of the brain. It has been used to study disease models in various animals.

While MPTP itself has no psychoactive effects, the compound may be accidentally produced during the manufacture of MPPP, a synthetic opioid drug with effects similar to those of morphine and pethidine (meperidine). The harmful effects of MPTP were first discovered when a group of people fell ill after injecting illegally obtained MPPP.

== Toxicity ==
Injection of MPTP causes rapid onset of Parkinsonism, hence users of MPPP contaminated with MPTP will develop these symptoms.

MPTP itself is not toxic, but it is a lipophilic compound and can therefore cross the blood–brain barrier. Once inside the brain, MPTP is metabolized into the toxic cation 1-methyl-4-phenylpyridinium (MPP^{+}) by the enzyme monoamine oxidase B (MAO-B) of glial cells, specifically astrocytes. MPP^{+} kills primarily dopamine-producing neurons in a part of the brain called the pars compacta of the substantia nigra (SNc). MPP^{+} interferes with complex I of the electron transport chain, a component of mitochondrial metabolism, which leads to cell death and causes the buildup of free radicals, toxic molecules that contribute further to cell destruction.

Because MPTP itself is not directly harmful, toxic effects of acute MPTP poisoning can be mitigated by the administration of monoamine oxidase inhibitors (MAOIs) such as selegiline. MAOIs prevent the metabolism of MPTP to MPP^{+} by inhibiting the action of MAO-B, minimizing toxicity, and preventing neural death.

Dopaminergic (DA) neurons are selectively vulnerable to MPP^{+} because DA neurons exhibit dopamine reuptake which is mediated by dopamine transporter (DAT), which also has high-affinity for MPP^{+}. The dopamine transporter scavenges for excessive dopamine at the synaptic spaces and transports them back into the cell. Even though this property is exhibited by both ventral tegmental area (VTA) and SNc neurons, VTA neurons are protective against MPP^{+} insult due to the expression of calbindin. Calbindin regulates the availability of Ca^{2+} within the cell, which is not the case in SNc neurons due to their high-calcium-dependent autonomous pacemaker activity.

The gross depletion of dopaminergic neurons severely affects voluntary control of complex movements. The direction of complex movement is based from the substantia nigra to the putamen and caudate nucleus, which then relay signals to the rest of the brain. This pathway is controlled via dopamine-using neurons, which MPTP selectively destroys, resulting, over time, in parkinsonism.

MPTP causes Parkinsonism in primates, including humans. Rodents are much less susceptible. Rats are almost immune to the adverse effects of MPTP. Mice were thought to only suffer from cell death in the substantia nigra (to a differing degree according to the strain of mice used) but do not show Parkinsonian symptoms; however, most of the recent studies indicate that MPTP can result in Parkinsonism-like syndromes in mice (especially chronic syndromes). It is believed that the lower levels of MAO-B in the rodent brain's capillaries may be responsible for this.

== Discovery in illicit drug users ==
The neurotoxic properties of MPTP were first observed in 1976, when Barry Kidston, a 23-year-old chemistry graduate student in Maryland, United States, synthesized MPPP that was contaminated with MPTP and injected it into himself. Within three days he developed symptoms resembling Parkinson's disease. Investigators from the National Institute of Mental Health later identified MPTP and other pethidine analogs in his laboratory. When these substances were tested on rats, no effects were detected due to the species' resistance to this type of neurotoxin. Kidston was treated with levodopa, but he died 18 months later from a cocaine overdose. An autopsy revealed Lewy bodies and loss of dopaminergic neurons in the substantia nigra.

In 1983, four people in Santa Clara County, California, US, were diagnosed with Parkinsonism after having used MPPP contaminated with MPTP, and as many as 120 were reported to have been diagnosed with Parkinson's symptoms. The neurologist J. William Langston in collaboration with NIH tracked down MPTP as the cause, and its effects on primates were researched. After performing neural grafts of fetal tissue on three of the patients at Lund University Hospital in Sweden, the motor symptoms of two of the three patients were successfully treated, and the third showed partial recovery.

Langston documented the case in his 1995 book The Case of the Frozen Addicts, which was later featured in two NOVA productions by PBS, re-aired in the UK on the BBC science series Horizon.

== Contribution of MPTP to research into Parkinson's disease ==
Langston et al. (1984) found that injections of MPTP in squirrel monkeys resulted in Parkinsonism, symptoms of which were subsequently reduced by levodopa, the drug-of-choice in the treatment of Parkinson's disease along with carbidopa and entacapone. The symptoms and brain structures of MPTP-induced Parkinson's disease are fairly indistinguishable to the point that MPTP may be used to simulate the disease in order to study Parkinson's disease physiology and possible treatments within the laboratory. Mouse studies have shown that susceptibility to MPTP increases with age.

Knowledge of MPTP and its use in reliably recreating Parkinson's disease symptoms in experimental models has inspired scientists to investigate the possibilities of surgically replacing neuron loss through fetal tissue implants, subthalamic electrical stimulation and stem cell research, all of which have demonstrated initial provisional successes.

It has been postulated that Parkinson's disease may be caused by minute amounts of MPP^{+}-like compounds from ingestion or exogenously through repeated exposure and that these substances are too minute to be detected significantly by epidemiological studies.

In 2000, another animal model for Parkinson's disease was found. It was shown that the pesticide and insecticide rotenone causes Parkinsonism in rats by killing dopaminergic neurons in the substantia nigra. Like MPP^{+}, rotenone also interferes with complex I of the electron transport chain.

== Synthesis and uses ==
MPTP was first synthesized as a potential analgesic in 1947 by Ziering et al. by reaction of phenylmagnesium bromide with 1-methyl-4-piperidinone. It was tested as a treatment for various conditions, but the tests were halted when Parkinson-like symptoms were noticed in monkeys. In one test of the substance, two of six human subjects died.

MPTP is used in industry as a synthetic precursor; the chloride salt of the toxic metabolite MPP^{+}, cyperquat, has been used as a herbicide. While cyperquat is not used anymore, the closely related substance paraquat is still being used as a herbicide.

== Analogues ==
Analogues of MPTP include 2′-NH_{2}-MPTP (2′-amino-MPTP) and 2′-CH_{3}-MPTP (2′-methyl-MPTP), among many others. The haloperidol-based monoaminergic compounds HPTP and HPP^{+} share structural similarities with MPTP.

== In popular culture ==
- In the novel Neuromancer, authored by William Gibson, MPTP is used as a means of inducing Parkinsonism in another character.
- MPTP-induced Parkinson's disease is featured in the Law & Order episode "Stiff."
- In Roger Williams' novel The Metamorphosis of Prime Intellect the protagonist administers MPTP to the anti-heroine's former nurse, who had stolen her painkillers in life, doing so as a means of neurodegenerative torture.

== See also ==
- Phenindamine
- 6-Hydroxydopamine
- Norsalsolinol
- MTHPI
