= 5,7-Dihydroxytryptamine =

Names
- Preferred IUPAC name 3-(2-Aminoethyl)-1H-indole-5,7-diol
- Other names 5,7-Dihydroxytryptamine

Identifiers
CAS Number	31363-74-3
3D model (JSmol)	Interactive image
ChEMBL	ChEMBL26726
ChemSpider	32913
ECHA InfoCard	100.045.977
EC Number	250-591-6
PubChem CID	35781
UNII	Y4K1D1H82S
CompTox Dashboard (EPA)	DTXSID00185285
- InChI: InChI=1S/C10H12N2O2/c11-2-1-6-5-12-10-8(6)3-7(13)4-9(10)14/h3-5,12-14H,1-2,11H2 Key: LXWHQTNFZDTKBH-UHFFFAOYSA-N; InChI=1/C10H12N2O2/c11-2-1-6-5-12-10-8(6)3-7(13)4-9(10)14/h3-5,12-14H,1-2,11H2 Key: LXWHQTNFZDTKBH-UHFFFAOYAC
- SMILES: Oc1cc2c(c(O)c1)[nH]cc2CCN

Properties
Chemical formula	C_{10}H_{12}N_{2}O_{2}
Molar mass	192.214 g/mol
- Except where otherwise noted, data are given for materials in their standard state (at 25 °C [77 °F], 100 kPa). verify (what is ?) Infobox references

5,7-Dihydroxytryptamine (5,7-DHT) is a monoaminergic neurotoxin used in scientific research to decrease concentrations of serotonin in the brain. The mechanism behind this effect is not well understood, but it is speculated to selectively destroy serotonergic neurons, in a manner similar to the dopaminergic neurotoxicity of 6-hydroxydopamine (6-OHDA). What is known is that this compound is in fact not selective in depleting serotonin content, but also depletes norepinephrine. To selectively deplete serotonin stores, it is commonly administered in conjunction with desmethylimipramine (desipramine), which inhibits the norepinephrine transporter.

== See also ==
- 4,5-Dihydroxytryptamine
- 5,6-Dihydroxytryptamine
- 6,7-Dihydroxytryptamine
- 7-Hydroxytryptamine
- 4-Hydroxy-5-methoxytryptamine
- DSP-4
- 6-Hydroxydopamine (6-OHDA)
- para-Chlorophenylalanine (PCPA)
