= 4,5-Dihydroxytryptamine =

Clinical data
- Other names: 4,5-DHT
- Drug class: Serotonergic neurotoxin

Identifiers
- IUPAC name: 3-(2-aminoethyl)-1H-indole-4,5-diol
- CAS Number: 42241-03-2
- PubChem CID: 179537
- ChemSpider: 156274
- CompTox Dashboard (EPA): DTXSID30195079

Chemical and physical data
- Formula: C_{10}H_{12}N_{2}O_{2}
- Molar mass: 192.218 g·mol^{−1}
- 3D model (JSmol): Interactive image
- SMILES: C1=CC(=C(C2=C1NC=C2CCN)O)O
- InChI: InChI=1S/C10H12N2O2/c11-4-3-6-5-12-7-1-2-8(13)10(14)9(6)7/h1-2,5,12-14H,3-4,11H2; Key:HKPREGWFNPFQEA-UHFFFAOYSA-N

4,5-Dihydroxytryptamine (4,5-DHT) is a serotonergic neurotoxin of the tryptamine family. It is structurally related to the monoamine neurotransmitter serotonin (5-hydroxytryptamine; 5-HT). The drug is also a monoamine reuptake inhibitor. Its analogue 4-hydroxy-5-methoxytryptamine (4-HO-5-MeO-T) is also a serotonergic neurotoxin. Rapid auto-oxidation of 4,5-DHT and 4-HO-5-MeO-T prevents them from being used as serotonergic neurotoxins in scientific research.

== See also ==
- Substituted tryptamine
- 5,6-Dihydroxytryptamine (5,6-DHT)
- 5,7-Dihydroxytryptamine (5,7-DHT)
- Psilomethoxin (4-HO-5-MeO-N,N-DMT)
