= Phenflutermine =

Clinical data
- Other names: Phenflutermin; 3-Trifluoromethyl-N-ethyl-α-methylamphetamine; 3-Trifluoromethyl-N-ethylphentermine; N-Ethyl-α,α-dimethyl-3-trifluoromethylphenethylamine; N-Et-α,α-Me-3-TFMPEA; Fenflutermine
- ATC code: None

Identifiers
- IUPAC name: N-ethyl-2-methyl-1-[3-(trifluoromethyl)phenyl]propan-2-amine

Chemical and physical data
- Formula: C_{13}H_{18}F_{3}N
- Molar mass: 245.289 g·mol^{−1}
- 3D model (JSmol): Interactive image
- SMILES: CCNC(C)(C)CC1=CC(C(F)(F)F)=CC=C1
- InChI: InChI=1S/C13H18F3N/c1-4-17-12(2,3)9-10-6-5-7-11(8-10)13(14,15)16/h5-8,17H,4,9H2,1-3H3; Key:DRSIPICEAYYBGT-UHFFFAOYSA-N

Phenflutermine, also known as 3-trifluoromethyl-N-ethyl-α-methylamphetamine or as 3-trifluoromethyl-N-ethylphentermine, is a chemical compound of the phenethylamine, amphetamine, and phentermine families. It is the combined or hybrid derivative of the fenfluramine and phentermine, which were used together in the withdrawn combination anorectic fenfluramine/phentermine (Fen-Phen). The compound was first described in the scientific literature by Daniel Trachsel in his book on phenethylamines in 2013. It is not known to have been synthesized, tested, or otherwise described in the literature. However, both fenfluramine and phentermine are known to act as monoamine releasing agents and to have anorectic effects.

== See also ==
- Substituted amphetamine
- Chlorphentermine
- Cloforex
- Etolorex
