= Obesity in pets =

Veterinary disease

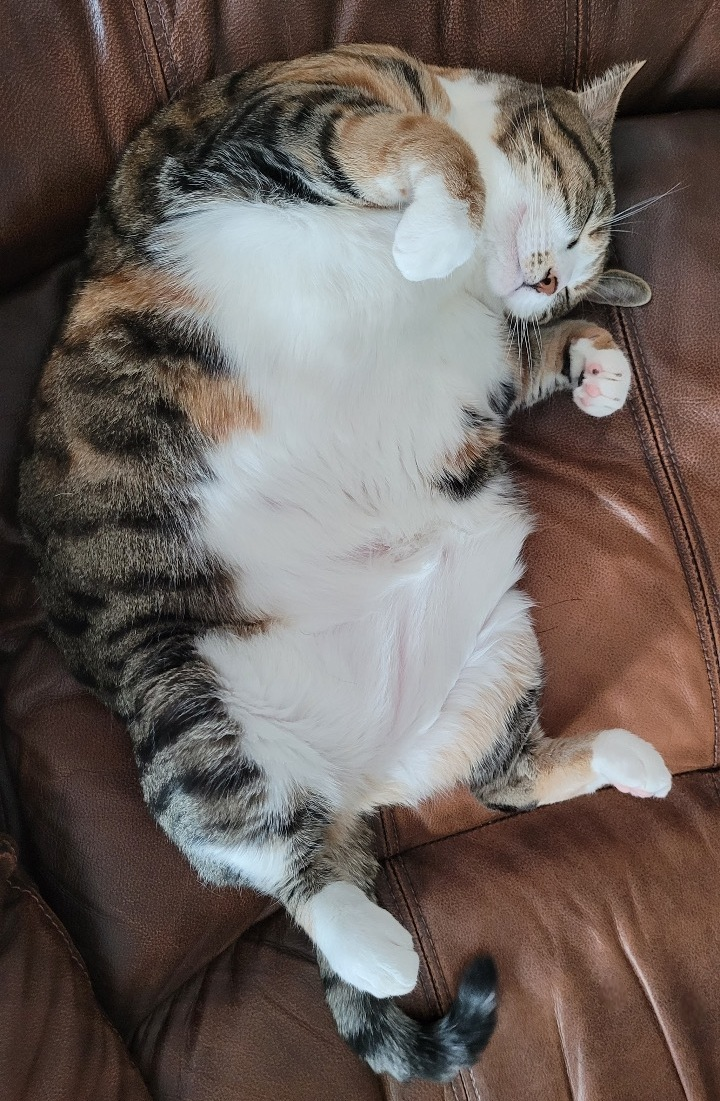
A cat with obesity

Obesity in pets occurs when excessive adipose tissue accumulates in the body, and is generally defined as occurring when an animal's body weight is at least 20% greater than its optimal body weight. Obesity is associated with metabolic and hormonal changes, and can predispose pets to illnesses like orthopedic disease, diabetes, and cancer.

== Diagnosis ==
For dogs and cats, a 9 point body condition score (BCS) system is used to identify whether they are above their ideal weight status. Scores 1-3 indicate 'too thin', 4 and 5 are 'ideal', 6 is 'above ideal', 7 is 'overweight' and 8 and 9 are 'obese'. There are numerous versions of the BCS chart available for use including 5-point and 7-point versions, however, the 9-point chart is the only version where the scores correlate with true body fat percentage measured using dual-energy X-ray absorptiometry (DEXA) scans.

A tortie cat with a BSC score of 7 (overweight).

Assigning a body condition score to a pet involves visual assessment and palpation of the animal to assess fat padding. An ideally conditioned dog should have a tapered waist when viewed from above and a clear abdominal tuck when viewed from the side. Ribs should not be visible, but ribs should be easily palpated with only a very thin layer of fat cover. Ideally conditioned cats will have a waist that can be observed behind their ribs, a slight fat pad over their ribs, and a minimal abdominal fat pad with no abdominal tuck.

These BCS methods are the most commonly used ways of diagnosing obesity in practice. Whilst they are not as accurate as performing DEXA scans that measure true body fat percentage, Body Condition Scoring is quick, non-invasive and requires no specialist equipment, just the scoring charts and a clinician. Similar systems exist for livestock. For horses there is the Henneke horse body condition scoring system.

Using weight alone is not a reliable tool for diagnosing obesity as individuals within a species and breed can vary significantly in their size. Weighing is still useful for monitoring changes and a gain in weight may be an indication of excess weight and should prompt assessing BCS. For dogs under a year there are Puppy Growth Charts where weights can be monitored in relation to an average growth curve, which again helps to monitor whether weight is increasing more than expected and deviating from the average growth curve should prompt assessing BCS.

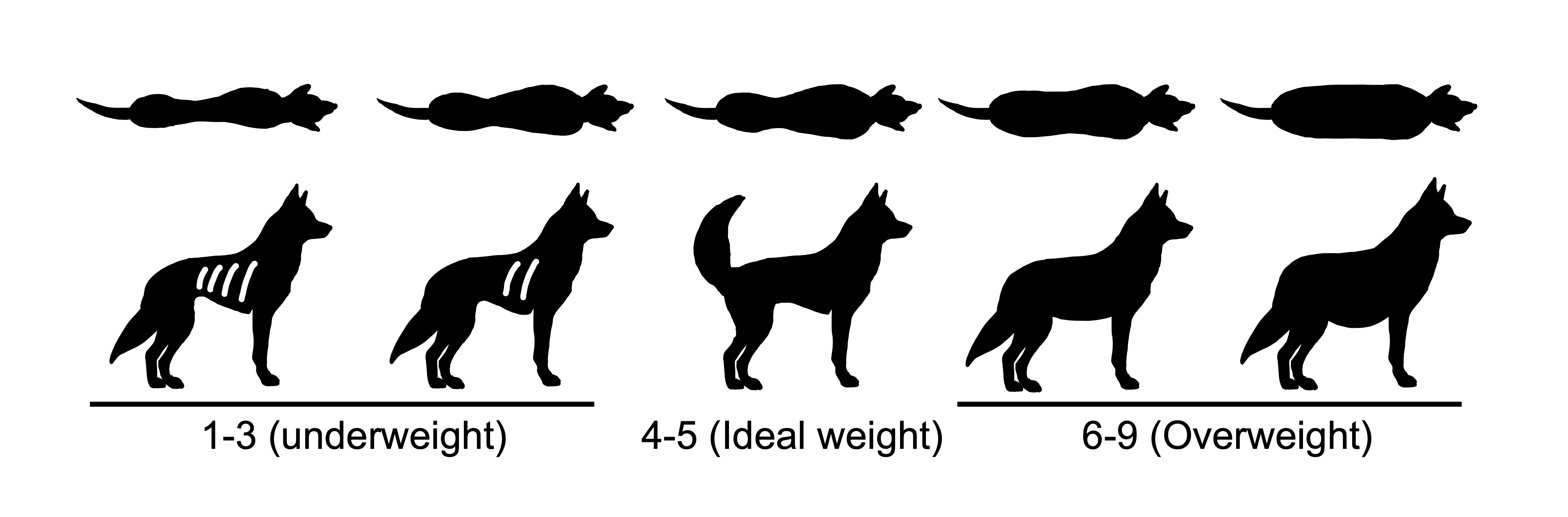
Canine body condition score (BCS) system

== Causes ==
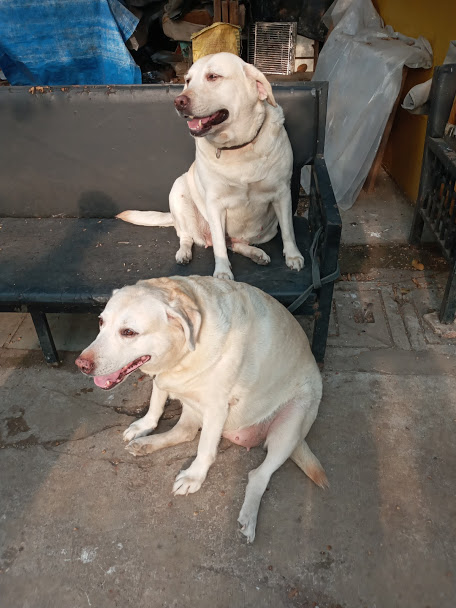
Obese labrador retrievers in India

Weight gain will occur when an animal is in a positive energy balance, meaning energy provided as calories in the diet exceed calories expended. Evidence suggests that middle-aged cats and dogs, especially those between the ages of 5 and 10, may be at an increased risk of obesity. This is supported by studies showing that as cats age from 2 years to approximately 11.5 years of age their energy requirements decrease. Weight gain will occur if calories from the diet do not decrease with the animal's energy requirements.

Obesity in pets is usually due to excessive food intake or lack of physical exercise. Owners may view food as a way to reward and treat their pets, which contributes to overfeeding. Pets confined to a house or small yard which are not regularly exercised are more prone to obesity.

The risk of obesity in dogs (but not in cats) can be related to whether or not their owners are obese. The main factor seems to be obese owners not walking their dogs as much.

In cats, neutering increases the risk of obesity, partly because the alteration in sex hormones after neutering lowers the basal metabolic rate, and partly because neutered cats have a reduced inclination to roam compared to non-neutered cats.

== Management ==
Weight management has two steps: weight loss and weight maintenance. In the weight loss phase, energy intake from food must be less than the energy expended each day. Achieving weight loss in cats and dogs is challenging, and failure to lose weight is common. If the animals themselves cannot control their own calorie intake, it is recommended that pet owners control the food amount given. Guidelines exist on energy allowances for animals of a given body weight.

Medical treatments have been developed to assist dogs in losing weight. Dirlotapide (brand name Slentrol) and mitratapide (brand name Yarvitan) were authorized for use in the EU by the European Medicines Agency for helping weight loss in dogs, by reducing appetite and food intake, but both of these drugs have been withdrawn from the market in the EU. The US Food and Drug Administration approved dirlotapide in 2007. Up to 20% of dogs treated with either dirlotapide or mitratapide experience vomiting and diarrhea; less commonly, loss of appetite may occur. When these drugs are stopped, the dog's appetite returns to previous levels. If other weight-loss strategies are not employed, the dog will again gain weight.

== Outcomes ==
Compared to non-obese animals, obese dogs and cats have a higher incidence of osteoarthritis (joint disease) and diabetes mellitus, which also occur earlier in the life of the animal. Obese animals are also at increased risk of complications following anesthesia or surgery.

Obese dogs are more likely to develop urinary incontinence, may have difficulty breathing, and overall have a poorer quality of life compared to non-obese dogs, as well as having a lower life expectancy. Obese cats have an increased risk of diseases affecting the mouth and urinary tract. Obese cats which have difficulty grooming themselves are predisposed to dry, flaky skin and feline acne.

== Epidemiology ==
In the United States, the prevalence of obese or overweight adult dogs is 23–53%, of which about 5% are obese; the incidence in adult cats is 55%, of which about 8% are obese.

In Australia, obesity is the most common nutritional disease of pets; the prevalence of obesity in dogs in Australia is approximately 40%.

== Society and culture ==
Pet owners in the UK have been prosecuted for cruelty to animals due to their pets being dangerously obese.

In the US, National Pet Obesity Awareness Day, is on the 14 October.

== See also ==
- Meow (cat)
- Prince Chunk
