= Maryanoff =

Maryanoff is a surname. Notable people with the surname include:

- Bruce E. Maryanoff (born 1947), American chemist
- Cynthia A. Maryanoff (born 1949), American chemist
