= Robert Owen Hutchins =

American organic chemist and educator

Robert Owen Hutchins (September 25, 1939 – October 9, 2009) was an American organic chemist and educator. Born in Danville, Illinois, Hutchins earned a B.S. degree from the University of California at Berkeley in 1961, an M.A. degree in phytochemistry from California State University, Long Beach in 1962, and a Ph.D. degree in organic chemistry from Purdue University under Joseph Wolinsky in 1967. He then completed a two-year post-doctoral research position with Ernest L. Eliel at Notre Dame University.

== Career ==
He joined Drexel University as an assistant professor in 1968; he was promoted to associate professor in 1974, and then full professor in 1979. He was named G.S. Sasin Professor of Organic Chemistry and served as chemistry department head for 14 years. He retired in 2008.

His research focused on new hydride reagents for asymmetric reduction, and the conformational analysis of phosphorus containing heterocycles. The ISI web of knowledge lists 96 publications and presentations at national meetings by Professor Hutchins and his co-workers, 2962 citations without self-citations, and a Hirsch index of 32.

Drexel honored Hutchins with a Research Achievement Award in 1982 and a University Scholar Award in 1985. In 1987 he received both the distinguished alumni award from California State and the 26th Research Award of the Philadelphia Section of the American Chemical Society. The Chemistry Department at Drexel announced establishment of the Dr. Robert O. Hutchins Endowed Chemistry Prize in 2002. The Constantine Papadakis Integrated Sciences Building at Drexel has an organic chemistry teaching laboratory named in memory of Hutchins.

== Teaching and students ==
Hutchins received the Christian R. and Mary F. Lindback distinguished teaching Award from Drexel in 1980. Among his notable group alumni are Bruce E. Maryanoff (inventor of topamax or topiramate), who was his first Ph.D. student (B.S. 1970, Ph.D. 1972), and Cindy A. (Milewski) Maryanoff, who was an undergraduate research participant (B.S. 1972). Dr. Ira Taffer (Ph.D.) and Dr. Robert Zipkin (B.S. Drexel, Ph.D. Univ. Penn), an undergraduate researcher, who later founded the Biotech company BIOMOL, were members of his research group.

== Personal life and death ==
Hutchins died on October 9, 2009, after an illness. His wife, Mary Gail Kinzer Hutchins, preceded him in death on August 16, 2001. He left behind two sons as well as two grandsons.
