= Phentermine =

Weight loss medication

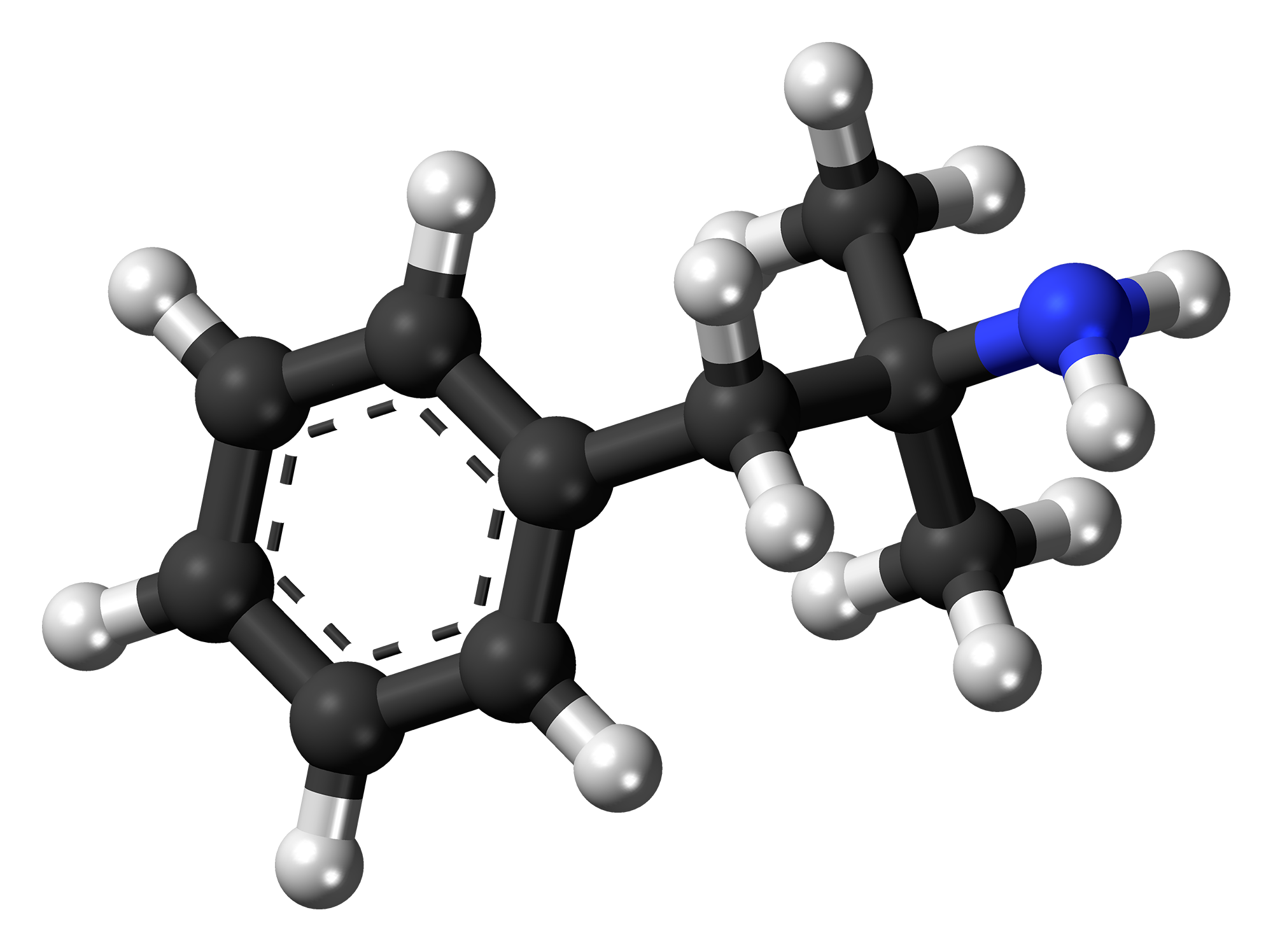

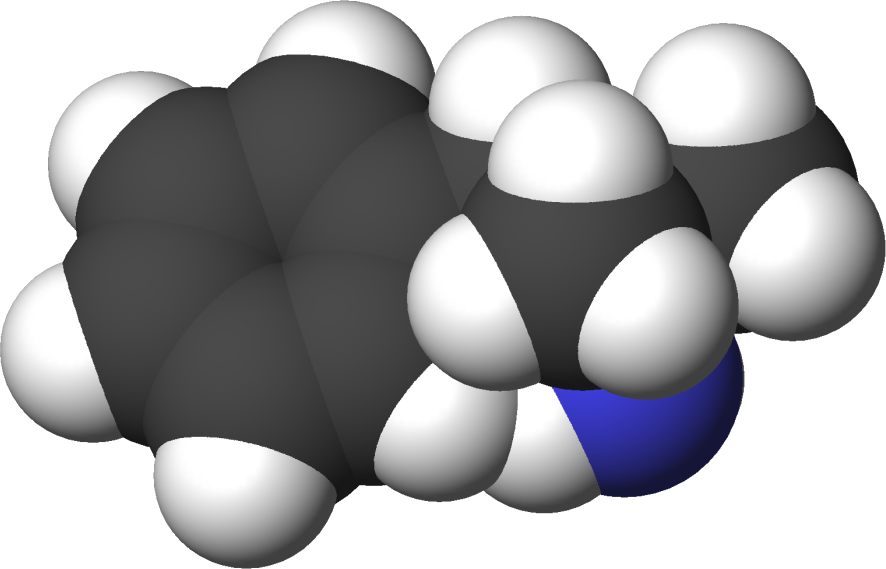

Clinical data
- Trade names: Adipex-P, others
- Other names: α,α-Dimethylphenethylamine; α,α-Dimethylphenylethylamine; α-Methylamphetamine
- AHFS/Drugs.com: Monograph
- MedlinePlus: a682187
- Pregnancy category: AU: B3
- Dependence liability: Physical: Not typical Psychological: Moderate
- Addiction liability: Low
- Routes of administration: By mouth
- Drug class: Psychostimulant; Appetite suppressant; Norepinephrine–dopamine releasing agent
- ATC code: A08AA01 (WHO) A08AA51 (WHO)

Legal status
- Legal status: AU: S4 (Prescription only); BR: Class B2 (Anorectic drugs); CA: Schedule IV; DE: Prescription only (Anlage III for higher doses); NZ: Class C; UK: Class C; US: Schedule IV; SE: Förteckning II (Note: Only one medication is currently approved, and it's a combination of phentermine and Topiramate)

Pharmacokinetic data
- Bioavailability: High (almost 100%)
- Protein binding: 17.5%
- Metabolism: Minimal (6%)
- Elimination half-life: 20–25 hours, urinary pH-dependent
- Excretion: Urine (62–85% unchanged)

Identifiers
- IUPAC name: 2-methyl-1-phenylpropan-2-amine
- CAS Number: 122-09-8
- PubChem CID: 4771
- IUPHAR/BPS: 7269
- DrugBank: DB00191
- ChemSpider: 4607
- UNII: C045TQL4WP
- KEGG: D05458
- ChEBI: CHEBI:8080
- ChEMBL: ChEMBL1574
- CompTox Dashboard (EPA): DTXSID9023461
- ECHA InfoCard: 100.004.112

Chemical and physical data
- Formula: C_{10}H_{15}N
- Molar mass: 149.237 g·mol^{−1}
- 3D model (JSmol): Interactive image
- SMILES: NC(C)(C)CC=1C=CC=CC1
- InChI: InChI=1S/C10H15N/c1-10(2,11)8-9-6-4-3-5-7-9/h3-7H,8,11H2,1-2H3; Key:DHHVAGZRUROJKS-UHFFFAOYSA-N

Phentermine, sold under the brand name Adipex-P among others, is a medication used together with diet and exercise to treat obesity. It is available by itself or as the combination phentermine/topiramate. Phentermine is taken by mouth.

Common side effects include a fast heart beat, high blood pressure, trouble sleeping, dizziness, and restlessness. Serious side effects may include abuse, but do not include pulmonary hypertension or valvular heart disease, as the latter complications were caused by the fenfluramine component of the "fen-phen" combination. Phentermine is a norepinephrine and dopamine releasing agent (NDRA) and produces stimulant, rewarding, and appetite suppressant effects. Chemically, it is a substituted amphetamine.

Phentermine was approved for medical use in the United States in 1959. It is available as a generic medication. In 2023, it was the 168th most commonly prescribed medication in the United States, with more than 3 million prescriptions. Phentermine was withdrawn from the market in the United Kingdom in 2000, while the combination medication fen-phen, of which it was a part, was withdrawn from the market in 1997, due to side effects of fenfluramine.

== Medical uses ==
Phentermine is used for a short period of time to promote weight loss, if exercise and calorie reduction are not sufficient, and in addition to exercise and calorie reduction.

Phentermine is approved for up to 12 weeks of use and most weight loss occurs in the first weeks. However, significant loss continues through the sixth month and has been shown to continue at a slower rate through the ninth month.

== Contraindications ==
Use is not recommended during pregnancy or breastfeeding, or with selective serotonin reuptake inhibitors (SSRIs) or monoamine oxidase inhibitors (MAOIs).

Phentermine is contraindicated for users who:

- have a history of drug abuse
- are allergic to sympathomimetic amine drugs
- are taking a monoamine oxidase inhibitor (MAOI) or have taken one within the last 14 days
- have cardiovascular disease, hyperthyroidism, or glaucoma
- are pregnant, planning to become pregnant, or breastfeeding.

== Adverse effects ==
Tolerance usually occurs; however, risks of dependence and addiction are considered negligible. People taking phentermine may be impaired when driving or operating machinery. Consumption of alcohol with phentermine may produce adverse effects.

There is no evidence regarding whether or not phentermine is safe for pregnant women.

Other adverse effects include:

- Cardiovascular effects like palpitations, tachycardia, high blood pressure, precordial pain; rare cases of stroke, angina, myocardial infarction, cardiac failure and cardiac arrest have been reported.
- Central nervous system effects like overstimulation, restlessness, nervousness, insomnia, tremor, dizziness and headache; there are rare reports of euphoria followed by fatigue and depression, and very rarely, psychotic episodes and hallucinations.
- Gastrointestinal effects include nausea, vomiting, dry mouth, cramps, unpleasant taste, diarrhea, and constipation.
- Other adverse effects include trouble urinating, rash, impotence, changes in libido, and facial swelling.

== Interactions ==
Phentermine may decrease the effect of drugs like clonidine, methyldopa, and guanethidine. Drugs to treat hypothyroidism may increase the effect of phentermine.

== Pharmacology ==
=== Pharmacodynamics ===
==== Monoamine releasing agent ====
Monoamine release of phentermine and related agents (EC_{50}, nM)
| Compound | NE | DA | 5-HT | Ref |
|---|---|---|---|---|
| Phenethylamine | 10.9 | 39.5 | >10,000 | |
| Dextroamphetamine | 6.6–7.2 | 5.8–24.8 | 698–1,765 | |
| Dextromethamphetamine | 12.3–13.8 | 8.5–24.5 | 736–1,292 | |
| Phentermine | 28.8–39.4 | 262 | 2,575–3,511 | |
| Chlorphentermine | >10,000 (RI) | 935–2,650 | 18.2–30.9 | |
Notes: The smaller the value, the more strongly the drug releases the neurotransmitter. The assays were done in rat brain synaptosomes and human potencies may be different. See also Monoamine releasing agent § Activity profiles for a larger table with more compounds. Refs:

Phentermine is a substrate of the monoamine transporters (MATs) and acts as a monoamine releasing agent (MRA), specifically as a norepinephrine–dopamine releasing agent (NDRA). It also acts as a norepinephrine–dopamine reuptake inhibitor (NDRI) to a lesser extent. The drug robustly and dose-dependently elevates brain norepinephrine and dopamine levels in animals. Phentermine is more potent in its effects on norepinephrine than on dopamine and the drug shows only weak effects on serotonin. Unlike many other amphetamines and MRAs, phentermine is completely inactive at the vesicular monoamine transporter 2 (VMAT2). Due to its actions on the catecholamines, phentermine produces effects including stimulation, rewarding effects, appetite suppression, and sympathomimetic effects in animals and humans.

In terms of monoamine release in vitro using rat brain synaptosomes, phentermine is about 6-fold less potent than dextroamphetamine in the case of norepinephrine release, 11-fold less potent than dextroamphetamine in the case of dopamine release, and has a ratio of norepinephrine release versus dopamine release of about 6.6:1 compared to dextroamphetamine's ratio of about 3.5:1. It is more than 3-fold less potent than amphetamine in elevating brain dopamine and serotonin levels in rodents in vivo, is about 10-fold less potent than amphetamine in terms of self-administration in monkeys, and is a relatively weak reinforcer in rodents. Although phentermine induces the release of dopamine at sufficiently high concentrations in vitro and at sufficiently high doses in rodents and monkeys in vivo, it may result in only weak or negligible brain dopamine release in humans at typical clinical doses. This may be due to its selectivity for induction of norepinephrine over dopamine release and may be analogous to the case of ephedrine (which is at least 10-fold selective for induction of norepinephrine over dopamine release). The effects of phentermine may be more related to noradrenergic activation rather than dopaminergic activity. However, more research is needed to assess the preceding notions.

As with other MRAs, phentermine produces dopaminergic neurotoxicity in rodents at high doses. It can also produce serotonergic neurotoxicity at very high doses in rodents. The clinical significance of these findings for humans, in which employed doses may be much lower, are unclear.

The combination of phentermine with a serotonin releasing agent (SRA) like fenfluramine results in suppression of brain dopamine release by phentermine and marked attenuation or abolition of phentermine's stimulant and rewarding effects in animals and humans. Conversely, combined phentermine and fenfluramine administration synergistically enhances the appetite suppression of these drugs in animals and results in greater weight loss than either drug alone in humans. Fenfluramine produces serotonergic neurotoxicity in animals and addition of phentermine results in either no change or augmentation of this neurotoxicity.

==== Other actions ====
Phentermine has been found to be completely inactive as a ligand or agonist of the serotonin 5-HT_{2} receptors, including of the serotonin 5-HT_{2A}, 5-HT_{2B}, and 5-HT_{2C} receptors. This is in contrast to the serotonin releasing agents (SRAs) fenfluramine, norfenfluramine, and to a lesser extent chlorphentermine. However, another study found that phentermine was a weak human serotonin 5-HT_{2C} receptor partial agonist (EC_{50} = 1,394 nM, V_{max} = 66%). In accordance with its lack of serotonin release and serotonin 5-HT_{2B} receptor agonism, phentermine appears to show no risk of primary pulmonary hypertension (PPH) or valvular heart disease (VHD) in humans.

Phentermine has been found to be active as an agonist of the rat and human trace amine-associated receptor 1 (TAAR1). It appears to be a weak human TAAR1 partial agonist (EC_{50} = 5,470 nM and E_{max} = 68% in one study). The drug shows reduced activity as a TAAR1 agonist compared to amphetamine. TAAR1 agonism by amphetamines that possess this action may serve to auto-inhibit and constrain their effects.

Phentermine is a very weak monoamine oxidase inhibitor (MAOI) in vitro. It specifically inhibits monoamine oxidase A (MAO-A) (IC_{50} = 85,000–143,000 nM) and monoamine oxidase B (MAO-B) (IC_{50} = 285,000 nM). However, its potency as a MAOI is far below its potency as a monoamine releasing agent. Relatedly, phentermine does not show neurochemical signs of MAOI activity in rodents in vivo. As such, the significance of phentermine as an MAOI in humans is questionable.

=== Pharmacokinetics ===
==== Absorption ====
The pharmacokinetics of phentermine are dose-dependent. Peak concentrations of phentermine are reached 6 hours following oral administration of a dose of 15 mg. The steady-state levels of phentermine with continuous administration have been found to be around 200 ng/mL in clinical studies. The oral bioavailability of phentermine is not affected by intake of a high-fat meal.

Phentermine is a lipophilic amine that is rapidly absorbed through the gastrointestinal tract following oral ingestion. Its weakly basic nature facilitates absorption in the small intestine, where it exists primarily in a non-ionized form at physiological pH. Peak plasma concentrations can vary slightly based on formulation (immediate vs. extended-release) and gastric motility.

==== Distribution ====
The volume of distribution of phentermine is 5 L/kg. Its plasma protein binding is approximately 17.5%.

==== Metabolism ====
Phentermine undergoes minimal metabolism. Only about 6% of an administered dose of phentermine is metabolized. It is metabolized to a minor extent by para-hydroxylation, N-oxidation, and N-hydroxylation, followed by conjugation.

==== Elimination ====
The drug is eliminated mainly in urine. It is excreted 62 to 85% unchanged in urine. The elimination half-life of phentermine is 20 to 25 hours. The elimination of phentermine is modified by urine acidicity or pH. In the case of acidic urine (pH < 5), the elimination half-life of phentermine has been found to be 7 to 8 hours. The clearance of phentermine is 8.79 L/h.

== History ==
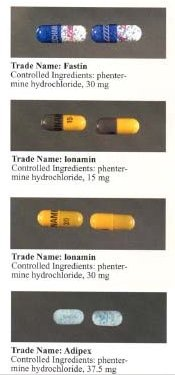

In 1959, phentermine first received approval from the US Food and Drug Administration (FDA) as an appetite suppressant. Eventually a hydrochloride salt and a resin form became available.

Phentermine was marketed with fenfluramine or dexfenfluramine as a combination appetite suppressant and fat burning agent under the popular name fen-phen. In 1997, after 24 cases of heart valve disease in fen-phen users, fenfluramine and dexfenfluramine were voluntarily taken off the market at the request of the FDA. Studies later showed nearly 30% of people taking fenfluramine or dexfenfluramine for up to 24 months had abnormal valve findings.

Phentermine is still available by itself in most countries, including the US. However, because it is similar to amphetamine, it is classified as a controlled substance in many countries. Internationally, phentermine is a schedule IV drug under the Convention on Psychotropic Substances. In the United States, it is classified as a Schedule IV controlled substance under the Controlled Substances Act. In contrast, amphetamine preparations are classified as Schedule II controlled substances.

The company Vivus developed a combination drug, phentermine/topiramate that it originally called Qnexa and then called Qsymia, which was invented and used off-label by Thomas Najarian, who opened a weight-clinic in Los Osos, California in 2001; Najarian had previously worked at Interneuron Pharmaceuticals, which had developed one of the fen-phen drugs previously withdrawn from the market. The FDA rejected the combination drug in 2010 due to concerns over its safety. In 2012, the FDA approved Qsymia after Vivus re-applied with further safety data. At the time, one obesity specialist estimated that around 70% of his colleagues were already prescribing the combination off-label.

== Chemistry ==
Phentermine, also known as α,α-dimethylphenethylamine or as α-methylamphetamine, is a substituted phenethylamine and amphetamine. It is the derivative of amphetamine in which a second methyl group is present at the alpha carbon. The drug is a positional isomer of methamphetamine (N-methylamphetamine) and of other methylamphetamines such as 4-methylamphetamine.

=== Derivatives ===
A number of derivatives of phentermine exist, including cericlamine, chlorphentermine, cloforex, clortermine, etolorex, mephentermine, 3,4-methylenedioxyphentermine (MDPH), 3,4-methylenedioxy-N-methylphentermine (MDMP or MDMPH), pentorex, and phenflutermine, among others. Some of these drugs, including chlorphentermine, cloforex, clortermine, and mephentermine, have been marketed as pharmaceutical drugs similarly to phentermine, for instance as appetite suppressants.

== Society and culture ==
=== Etymology ===
The term phentermine is contracted from phenyl-tertiary-butyl amine.

=== Brand names ===
Phentermine is sold under many brand names and formulations worldwide, including Acxion, Adipex, Adipex-P, Duromine, Elvenir, Fastin, Ionamin, Lomaira (phentermine hydrochloride), Panbesy, Qsymia (phentermine and topiramate), Razin, Redusa, Sentis, Suprenza, and Terfamex.
