= Clortermine =

Chemical compound

Clinical data
- Other names: 2-chloro-α,α-dimethylphenethylamine; 2-chloro-α-methylamphetamine; 2-chlorophentermine
- Pregnancy category: ?
- Routes of administration: Oral
- ATC code: none

Legal status
- Legal status: US: Schedule III; In general: ℞ (Prescription only)

Identifiers
- IUPAC name: 1-(2-chlorophenyl)-2-methylpropan-2-amine
- CAS Number: 10389-73-8
- PubChem CID: 25223
- DrugBank: DB01527
- ChemSpider: 23558
- UNII: 4FA88HM3IX
- KEGG: D03566
- ChEMBL: ChEMBL1697833
- CompTox Dashboard (EPA): DTXSID0022850

Chemical and physical data
- Formula: C_{10}H_{14}ClN
- Molar mass: 183.68 g·mol^{−1}
- 3D model (JSmol): Interactive image
- SMILES: Clc1ccccc1CC(N)(C)C
- InChI: InChI=1S/C10H14ClN/c1-10(2,12)7-8-5-3-4-6-9(8)11/h3-6H,7,12H2,1-2H3; Key:HXCXASJHZQXCKK-UHFFFAOYSA-N

Clortermine (Voranil) was developed by Ciba in the 1960s and is an anorectic drug of the amphetamine class. It is the 2-chloro analogue of the better-known appetite suppressant phentermine and is the 2-chloro positional isomer of chlorphentermine. Clortermine produces very low rates of self-administration in animals similarly to chlorphentermine, and as a result it likely does not act on dopamine. Instead, it may act as a serotonin and/or norepinephrine releasing agent.

== See also ==
- 3,4-Dichloroamphetamine
- Cericlamine
- Chlorphentermine
- Cloforex
- Etolorex
- Methylenedioxyphentermine
- Phentermine
