= Vivus =

Pharmaceutical Company

Vivus (OTC Pink: VVUSQ) is a small pharmaceutical company headquartered in Campbell, California that specializes in obesity, sleep, and sexual health. Vivus developed Avanafil, an erectile dysfunction drug that has completed Phase 3 clinical trials. The drug has been approved for use by the Food and Drug Administration, and is sold under the trademark name Stendra. Stendra is the first and only oral erectile dysfunction treatment approved to be taken approximately 15 minutes before sexual activity.

== Overview ==
The 2009 documentary film "Orgasm Inc." was made at Vivus to document the process of creating a treatment for female sexual arousal disorder (FSD).

Vivus also developed an obesity drug, Qnexa (now called Qsymia), a combination of phentermine and topiramate, two existing weight-loss drugs. On July 17, 2012, the Food and Drug Administration approved Qsymia (phentermine and topiramate extended-release) as an addition to a reduced-calorie diet and exercise for chronic weight management. The drug was approved for use in adults with a body mass index (BMI) of 30 or greater (obese) or adults with a BMI of 27 or greater (overweight) who have at least one weight-related condition such as high blood pressure (hypertension), type 2 diabetes, or high cholesterol (dyslipidemia).

In 2016, the company was ranked #23 on the Deloitte Fast 500 North America list.

In 2020, the company filed for bankruptcy protection.
