= Luttwak =

Luttwak, Lutwak, Luttwack, Lutvak (לוטבק, לוטוואק, לוטווק, לוטבאק)
- Pronunciation: Lut-wak/Lut-vak

Origin
- Language: Yiddish
- Origin: Yiddish, Lithuanian, German, Polish
- Meaning: Lithuanian, from Lithuania (Litvak)
- Region of origin: Lithuania, Poland, Romania, Germany

Luttwak or Lutwak is a Jewish surname. Notable persons with that name include:

- Edward Luttwak (born 1942), American military strategist and historian
- Erwin Lutwak (born 1946), American mathematician
- Leo Lutwak (1928–2006), American nutritionist, endocrinologist, and biochemist
- Steven Lutvak, Musician, songwriter and lyricist
