= Robert Hutchins =

Robert Hutchins may refer to:

- Robert Maynard Hutchins (1899–1977), American educational philosopher
- Robert Owen Hutchins (1939–2009), American organic chemist and educator
- Bobby Hutchins (1925–1945), American child actor

== See also ==
- Robert Hutchings (fl. 1980s–2010s), former chair of the National Intelligence Council
