= 3,4-Methylenedioxyphentermine =

Chemical compound

MDPH

Clinical data
- Other names: MDP; MDPH; 3,4-Methylenedioxyphentermine; 3,4-Methylenedioxy-α,α-dimethylphenethylamine; 3,4-Methylenedioxy-α-methylamphetamine; α-Methyl-MDA
- Routes of administration: Oral
- Drug class: Psychoactive drug
- ATC code: None

Pharmacokinetic data
- Duration of action: 3–5 hours

Identifiers
- IUPAC name: 1-(2H-1,3-benzodioxol-5-yl)-2-methylpropan-2-amine
- CAS Number: 39235-63-7
- PubChem CID: 13020598
- ChemSpider: 15204207
- UNII: WF9K2PM8J8
- ChEMBL: ChEMBL126226
- CompTox Dashboard (EPA): DTXSID90515395

Chemical and physical data
- Formula: C_{11}H_{15}NO_{2}
- Molar mass: 193.246 g·mol^{−1}
- 3D model (JSmol): Interactive image
- SMILES: NC(C)(C)CC1=CC(OCO2)=C2C=C1
- InChI: InChI=1S/C11H15NO2/c1-11(2,12)6-8-3-4-9-10(5-8)14-7-13-9/h3-5H,6-7,12H2,1-2H3; Key:OIZBHKBNZXRXSM-UHFFFAOYSA-N

MDPH, also known as 3,4-methylenedioxyphentermine or as α-methyl-MDA, is a psychoactive drug of the amphetamine family. MDPH was first synthesized by Alexander Shulgin. Very little data exists about the pharmacological properties, metabolism, and toxicity of MDPH.

== Use and effects ==
In his book PiHKAL (Phenethylamines I Have Known and Loved), Alexander Shulgin lists MDPH's dose as 160 to 240 mg orally and its duration as 3 to 5 hours. MDPH's effects are very similar to those of MDA: they both are smooth and "stoning," and do not cause any visuals. They also alter dreams and dream patterns. But it is said to have none of the magic of MDMA. Shulgin describes MDPH as a promoter; it promotes the effects of other drugs, similarly to 2C-D.

== Chemistry ==
=== Synthesis ===
The chemical synthesis of MDPH has been described.

=== Analogues ===
The N-methyl derivative, 3,4-methylenedioxy-N-methylphentermine (MDMPH), has been described by Shulgin as lacking MDMA-like effects. Accordingly, MDMPH, as well as MDPH, were found to be inactive as serotonin releasing agents in vitro.

== Society and culture ==
=== Legal status ===
==== United Kingdom ====
This substance is a Class A drug in the Drugs controlled by the UK Misuse of Drugs Act.

== See also ==
- Substituted methylenedioxyphenethylamine
- 3,4-Dichloroamphetamine
- Cericlamine
- Chlorphentermine
- Cloforex
- Clortermine
- Etolorex
- Methylenedioxyphenmetrazine
- Phentermine
