= Fenfluramine/phentermine =

Withdrawn anti-obesity drug combination

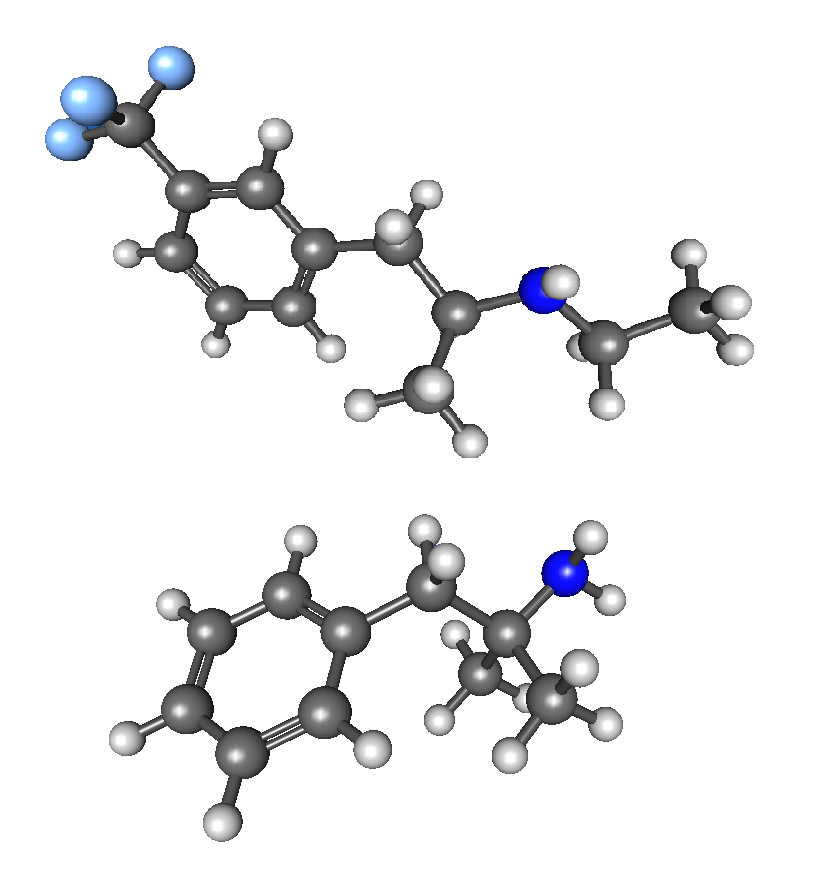

Combination of
- Fenfluramine: Serotonergic
- Phentermine: Adrenergic, dopaminergic, serotonergic

Clinical data
- Routes of administration: Oral
- ATC code: none

Legal status
- Legal status: Withdrawn

Identifiers
- CAS Number: 159089-37-9

The drug combination fenfluramine/phentermine, usually called fen-phen, is an anti-obesity medication that is no longer widely available. It was sold in the early 1990s, and utilized two anorectics. Fenfluramine was marketed by American Home Products (later known as Wyeth) as Pondimin, but was shown to cause potentially fatal pulmonary hypertension and heart valve problems, which eventually led to its withdrawal in 1997 and legal damages of over $13 billion. On the other hand, phentermine has side effects such as a fast heart beat, high blood pressure, trouble sleeping, dizziness, and restlessness.

Fenfluramine acts as a serotonin releasing agent, phentermine as primarily a norepinephrine releasing agent. Phentermine also induces the release of serotonin and dopamine, although to a far lesser extent than it induces the release of norepinephrine.

== History ==
Fenfluramine as a single drug was first introduced in the 1970s, but was not popular because it only temporarily reduced weight. A 1984 study found a weight loss of 7.5 kg on average in 24 weeks, as compared to 4.4 kg under placebo. It sold modestly until the 1990s, when it was combined with phentermine and heavily marketed.

=== Testing on children in New York City ===
The New York Psychiatric Institute, associated with Columbia University, the Research Foundation of the City University of New York, and Mount Sinai Medical Center tested fenfluramine intravenously on more than 100 Black and Hispanic boys between the ages of 6 and 10, with delinquent older brothers, to test the theory that delinquent behavior could be predicted by serotonin levels. These studies were conducted before the drug was pulled from the market in September 1997. In 1998, CNN reported that these organizations were under "evaluation" by the Office for Protection from Research Risks, an arm of the National Institutes of Health. An article in Nature reports that these tests were published as a study in Archives of General Psychiatry in 1997 and that "The New York trial, funded largely by the Lowenstein Foundation, with some support from the National Institute of Mental Health, was halted in 1995, two years before the drug was withdrawn." In 1999, The New York Times reported that the Mount Sinai School of Medicine and the Research Foundation of the City University of New York were officially faulted by federal research-ethics officials for conducting these tests. The article reports that the yearlong investigation found no misconduct by the New York State Psychiatric Institute for these tests. This article reports the number of children involved in the study as 150 and states that none were harmed.

=== Harm and litigation ===
A similar drug, aminorex, had caused severe lung damage and "provided reason to worry that similar drugs ... could increase the risk of a rare but often fatal lung disease, pulmonary hypertension." In 1994, Wyeth official Fred Wilson expressed concerns about fenfluramine's labeling containing only four cases of pulmonary hypertension when a total of 41 had been observed, but no action was taken until 1996. In 1995, Wyeth introduced dexfenfluramine (the dextro isomer, marketed as Redux), which it hoped would cause fewer adverse effects. However, the medical officer of the Food and Drug Administration (FDA), Leo Lutwak, insisted upon a black box warning of pulmonary hypertension risks. After Lutwak refused to approve the drug, the FDA management had James Milton Bilstad, FDA Senior Drug Evaluator, sign it and approve the drug with no black box warning for marketing in 1996. European regulators required a major warning of pulmonary hypertension risks.

In 1996, a 30-year-old woman developed heart problems after a month of using fenfluramine/phentermine; when she died in February 1997, the Boston Herald devoted a front-page article to her. In August 1997, a paper in the New England Journal of Medicine (NEJM) from the Mayo Clinic discussed clinical findings in 24 people who had taken fen-phen. The authors noted that their findings suggested a possible correlation between mitral valve dysfunction and the use of these anorectic agents. The FDA alerted medical practitioners that it had received nine additional reports of the same type and requested all health care professionals to report any such cases to the agency’s MedWatch program, or to their respective pharmaceutical manufacturers. The FDA subsequently received over a hundred additional reports of valvular heart disease in people taking fen-phen, fenfluramine alone, or dexfenfluramine alone. The FDA requested that the manufacturers of fenfluramine and dexfenfluramine stress the potential risk to the heart in the drugs' labeling and in package inserts. The FDA continued to receive reports in 1997 of valvular heart disease in people who had taken these drugs. This disease typically involves the aortic and mitral valves.

After reports of valvular heart disease and pulmonary hypertension, primarily in women who had been undergoing treatment with fen-phen or (dex)fenfluramine, the FDA requested its withdrawal from the market in September 1997. The action was based on findings from doctors who had evaluated people taking these two drugs with echocardiograms, a procedure that can test the functioning of heart valves. The findings indicated that approximately 30 percent of people who had taken the combination for up to 24 months had abnormal echocardiograms, even though they had no symptoms. This percentage of abnormal test results was much higher than would be expected from a sample of the population who had not been exposed to either fenfluramine or dexfenfluramine. Follow-up studies showed that for people who took the combination for 3 months or less, the rate of heart valve complications was less than 3%.

=== Aftermath ===
Upon the release of the information regarding fen-phen's cardiac risks, the Association of Trial Lawyers of America formed a large trial lawyer group to seek damages from American Home Products, the distributor of fenfluramine and dexfenfluramine.

Fen-phen is no longer widely available. In April 2005, American Lawyer magazine ran a cover story on the wave of fen-phen litigation, reporting that more than 50,000 product liability lawsuits had been filed by alleged fen-phen victims. Total liability was estimated to be as high as $14 billion. Wyeth was still in negotiations with injured parties in February 2005, offering settlements of $5,000 to $200,000 to some of those who had sued, and stating they might offer more to those who were most seriously injured. One plaintiff's attorney said that "the payments [were] not going to be large enough to cover medical expenses." Thousands of injured persons rejected these offers. At the time, Wyeth announced it had set aside $21.1 billion (U.S.) to cover the cost of the lawsuits.

== Possible uses ==
=== Obesity ===
In 1984, researchers at the University of Rochester Medical Center reported that they had performed a double-blind, controlled clinical trial comparing phentermine alone, fenfluramine alone, a combination of phentermine and fenfluramine, and placebo, for weight loss in humans. Weight loss in those receiving the fen-phen combination was significantly greater (8.4±1.1 kg) than in those receiving placebo (4.4±0.9 kg) and equivalent to that of those receiving fenfluramine (7.5±1.2 kg) or phentermine alone (10.0±1.2 kg). This amounts to an additional weight loss of 4±2 kg over the course of 24 weeks. Adverse effects were less frequent with the combination regimen than with the other active (non-placebo) treatments. The authors felt that combining fenfluramine and phentermine capitalized on their pharmacodynamic differences, resulting in equivalent weight loss, fewer adverse effects, and better appetite control.

=== Addiction remission ===
The term fen-phen was created in 1994 when Pietr Hitzig and Richard B. Rothman reported that this combination could presumptively remit alcohol and cocaine craving. The authors suggested that other combined dopamine and serotonin agonists or precursors might share this therapeutic potential. Subsequent experiments in rats supported these preliminary reports. In 2006 it was confirmed that the combination of phentermine and the serotonin precursor 5-hydroxytryptophan (5-HTP), in place of fenfluramine, significantly decreased alcohol withdrawal seizures in rats.

Intramural National Institutes of Health (NIH) double-blind protocols to demonstrate the efficacy of fen-phen in alcohol and cocaine addiction were designed, but never performed.

== Adverse effects of serotonin ==
The findings on fen-phen, specifically fenfluramine, causing valvular heart disease and pulmonary hypertension prompted a renewed interest in the deleterious effects of systemic serotonin. It had already been known for decades that two of the major side-effects of the carcinoid syndrome, in which excessive serotonin is produced endogenously, are valvular disease and pulmonary hypertension. Several centers were able to note a relationship to an excessive activation of the serotonin receptor subtype 5-HT_{2B}.

== See also ==
- Semaglutide, another weight-loss drug that gained mass popularity
- Phenflutermine
