= Etolorex =

Chemical compound

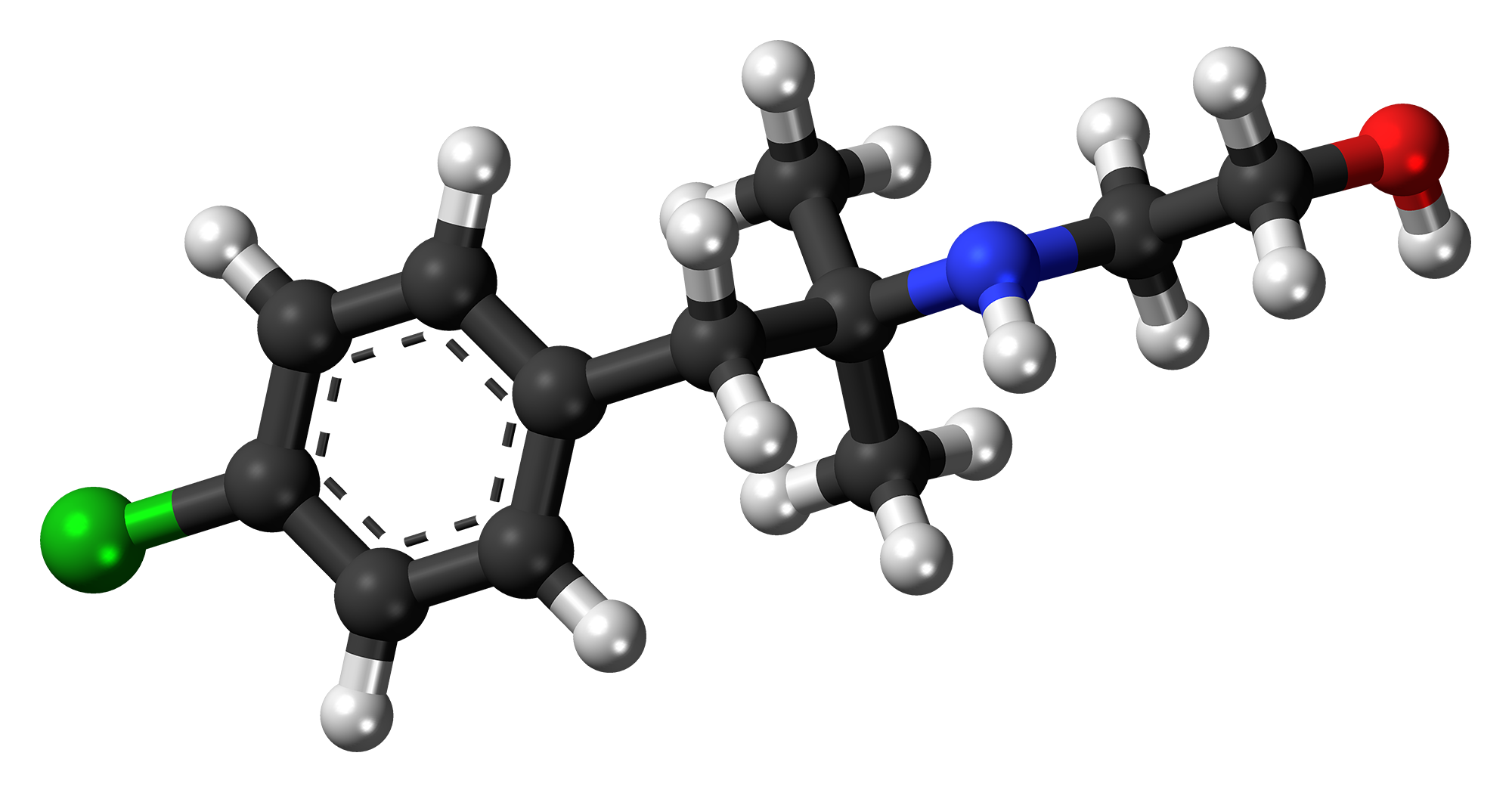

Clinical data
- Routes of administration: Oral
- ATC code: none

Legal status
- Legal status: In general: uncontrolled

Identifiers
- IUPAC name: 2-{[1-(4-chlorophenyl)-2-methylpropan-2-yl]amino}ethanol
- CAS Number: 54063-36-4
- PubChem CID: 208943
- ChemSpider: 181037
- UNII: 449NCX1P03
- ChEMBL: ChEMBL2105576
- CompTox Dashboard (EPA): DTXSID80202388

Chemical and physical data
- Formula: C_{12}H_{18}ClNO
- Molar mass: 227.73 g·mol^{−1}
- 3D model (JSmol): Interactive image
- SMILES: Clc1ccc(cc1)CC(NCCO)(C)C

Etolorex is a central nervous system (CNS) stimulant and anorectic drug belonging to the substituted amphetamine and phenethylamine chemical classes. Etolorex was derived from phentermine, an amphetamine derivative in its own right frequently prescribed as a weight loss drug for the treatment of obesity with a positive side effect of CNS activation and energizing the patient. Etolorex, for unknown reasons, was never marketed.

== Synthesis ==
Patent:

Made by the reaction of chlorphentermine with 2-Chloroethanol.

== See also ==
- 3,4-Dichloroamphetamine
- Cericlamine
- Chlorphentermine
- Cloforex
- Clortermine
- Methylenedioxyphentermine
- Phentermine
