= Chlorphentermine =

Weight loss medication

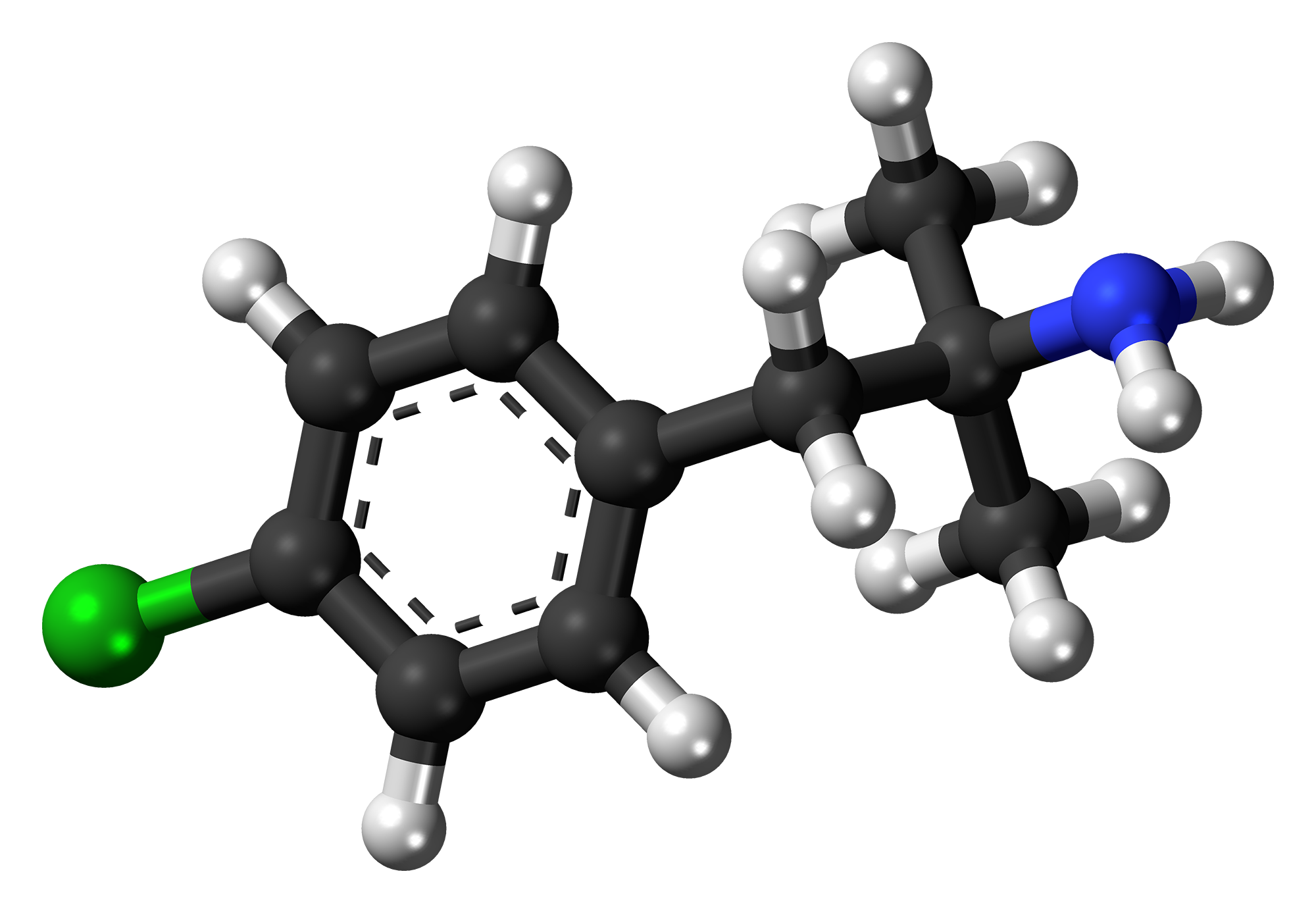

Clinical data
- Trade names: Apsedon, Desopimon, Lucofen, others
- Other names: 4-Chlorophentermine; 4-Chloro-α-methylamphetamine; 4-Chloro-α,α-dimethylphenethylamine
- Routes of administration: Oral
- Drug class: Serotonin releasing agent; Anorectic
- ATC code: A08AA (WHO)

Legal status
- Legal status: BR: Class A3 (Psychoactive drugs); CA: Schedule IV; UK: Class C; US: Schedule III (but withdrawn from the market)

Pharmacokinetic data
- Elimination half-life: 40 hours–5 days

Identifiers
- IUPAC name: 1-(4-chlorophenyl)-2-methylpropan-2-amine
- CAS Number: 461-78-9 151-06-4
- PubChem CID: 10007
- DrugBank: DB01556
- ChemSpider: 9613
- UNII: NHW07912O7
- KEGG: C07559
- ChEMBL: ChEMBL1201269
- CompTox Dashboard (EPA): DTXSID0022806
- ECHA InfoCard: 100.006.651

Chemical and physical data
- Formula: C_{10}H_{14}ClN
- Molar mass: 183.68 g·mol^{−1}
- 3D model (JSmol): Interactive image
- SMILES: Clc1ccc(cc1)CC(N)(C)C
- InChI: InChI=1S/C10H14ClN/c1-10(2,12)7-8-3-5-9(11)6-4-8/h3-6H,7,12H2,1-2H3; Key:ZCKAMNXUHHNZLN-UHFFFAOYSA-N

Chlorphentermine, sold under the brand names Apsedon, Desopimon, and Lucofen, is a serotonergic appetite suppressant of the amphetamine family. Developed in 1962, it is the para-chloro derivative of the better-known appetite suppressant phentermine, which is still in current use.

The drug acts as a highly selective serotonin releasing agent (SRA). It is not a psychostimulant and has little or no misuse potential, but is classed as a Schedule III drug in the United States, due mainly to its similarity to other appetite suppressants such as diethylpropion, which have been more widely misused. It is no longer used due mainly to safety concerns, as it has a serotonergic effects profile similar to other withdrawn appetite suppressants, such as fenfluramine and aminorex, which were found to cause pulmonary hypertension and cardiac fibrosis following prolonged use.

Chlorphentermine was first synthesized by 1954 and was subsequently developed in the early 1960s. It remained on the market in the United States as late as 2004.

== Medical uses ==
Chlorphentermine was used as an appetite suppressant for purposes of weight loss in people with overweightness or obesity.

== Side effects ==
Side effects of chlorphentermine include impaired sleep, irritability, and gastrointestinal symptoms including dyspepsia.

Euphoria is said to occasionally occur with chlorphentermine, but to a much lesser extent than with dextroamphetamine. The drug does not produce amphetamine-like subjective effects in humans and the psychostimulant effects of chlorphentermine are described as much less than those of dextroamphetamine.

== Pharmacology ==
=== Pharmacodynamics ===
Monoamine release of chlorphentermine and related agents (EC_{50}, nM)
Compound	NE	DA	5-HT	Ref
Phenethylamine	10.9	39.5	>10,000	
Dextroamphetamine	6.6–7.2	5.8–24.8	698–1,765	
para-Chloroamphetamine	23.5–26.2	42.2–68.5	28.3	
Phentermine	28.8–39.4	262	2,575–3,511	
Chlorphentermine	>10,000 (RI)	935–2,650	18.2–30.9	
Notes: The smaller the value, the more strongly the drug releases the neurotransmitter. The assay was done in rat brain synaptosomes and human potencies may be different. See also Monoamine releasing agent § Activity profiles for a larger table with more compounds. Refs:

Chlorphentermine acts as a selective serotonin releasing agent (SSRA). The EC_{50} for monoamine release with chlorphentermine are 30.9 nM for serotonin, >10,000 nM for norepinephrine, and 2,650 nM for dopamine. Although it is inactive as a norepinephrine releasing agent, it is a moderately potent norepinephrine reuptake inhibitor (IC_{50} = 451 nM; 15-fold lower than its EC_{50} value for serotonin release). The activity of chlorphentermine as an SSRA is in contrast to phentermine, which acts as a selective norepinephrine and dopamine releasing agent (NDRA).

In animals, chlorphentermine robustly and dose-dependently increases serotonin levels in the brain. It also increases dopamine levels in the brain at high doses. Whereas dextroamphetamine and phentermine robustly stimulate locomotor activity and are self-administered in animals, chlorphentermine does not increase locomotor activity and is either not self-administered or is only weakly self-administered. Conversely, it has been reported that chlorphentermine weakly stimulates locomotor activity at low doses and progressively suppresses it at higher doses. In contrast to other amphetamines, it does not produce stereotypies or reverse reserpine-induced behavioral depression. In addition, unlike para-chloroamphetamine (PCA), chlorphentermine does not produce the head-twitch response, a behavioral proxy of psychedelic effects, in animals.

In contrast to fenfluramine and norfenfluramine, chlorphentermine shows negligible activity as an agonist of the serotonin 5-HT_{2A}, 5-HT_{2B}, and 5-HT_{2C} receptors. Its EC_{50} values at these receptors are >10,000 nM, 5,370 nM, and 6,456 nM, respectively. These EC_{50} values are >324-fold, 164-fold, and 209-fold lower than its EC_{50} value in inducing serotonin release, respectively.

Despite its lack of direct agonism at the serotonin 5-HT_{2B} receptors, chlorphentermine shows induction of primary pulmonary hypertension in animal models. This suggests that serotonin release can induce this form of toxicity without concomitant direct serotonin 5-HT_{2B} receptor agonism. However, other findings seem to contradict this hypothesis, showing that increases in serotonin levels with fenfluramine and other serotonin-elevating drugs are inadequate for inducing cardiac valvulopathy-like changes, and instead implicating additional direct serotonin 5-HT_{2B} receptor agonism in this toxicity. Studies have suggested that it is possible that an active metabolite of chlorphentermine might show greater serotonin 5-HT_{2B} receptor agonism than chlorphentermine itself, analogously to the case of fenfluramine and norfenfluramine, and that this possibility should be examined.

The amphetamine homologue of chlorphentermine, PCA, is a potent serotonergic neurotoxin. In contrast to PCA, preliminary animal experiments suggest that chlorphentermine is non-neurotoxic, although more research in this area is still needed.

=== Pharmacokinetics ===
The elimination half-life of chlorphentermine is relatively long, between 40 hours and about 5 days.

== Chemistry ==
Chlorphentermine, also known as 4-chlorophentermine, 4-chloro-α-methylamphetamine, and 4-chloro-α,α-dimethylphenethylamine, is a substituted phenethylamine and amphetamine derivative. It is the para-chloro analogue of phentermine. Chlorphentermine is closely structurally related to certain other phentermines, including cericlamine, cloforex, clortermine, etolorex, and methylenedioxyphentermine (MDPH). It is closely structurally related to the amphetamine derivatives para-chloroamphetamine (PCA) and para-chloromethamphetamine (PCMA) as well.

== History ==
Chlorphentermine was first described in the scientific literature by 1954. It was subsequently developed for use as an appetite suppressant in the early 1960s. The drug is said to have been withdrawn from the market in the United States in 1969 and in the United Kingdom in 1974. However, other sources indicate that chlorphentermine continued to be marketed in the United States as late as 2004. Pulmonary toxicity of chlorphentermine was observed in animals by the early 1970s and, resulting in reservations about its clinical use.
