= Cynthia A. Maryanoff =

American chemist

Cynthia Maryanoff
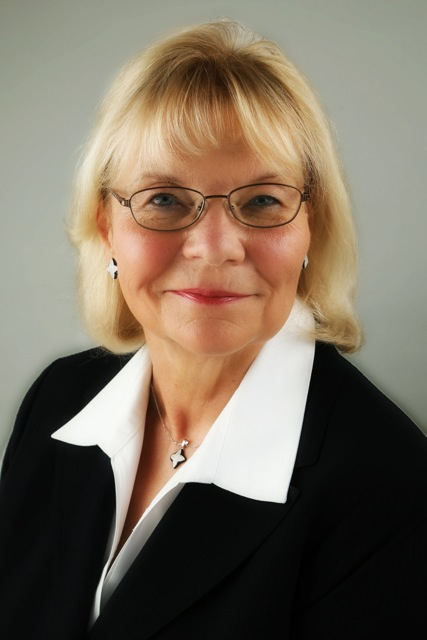
- Born: Cynthia Anne Milewski; November 27, 1949 (age 76); Shenandoah, Pennsylvania, U.S.
- Education: Drexel University, Princeton University
- Awards: Perkin Medal (2015)
- Scientific career
- Fields: Organic and materials chemistry
- Workplaces: Johnson & Johnson
- Doctoral advisor: Kurt Mislow

Cynthia "Cyndie" Anne Maryanoff (née Milewski; born November 27, 1949) is an American organic and materials chemist. Among other awards, she received the 2015 Perkin Medal for outstanding work in applied chemistry in the U.S.A.

== Education ==
Cynthia Anne Milewski was born on November 27, 1949, in Shenandoah, Pennsylvania. She married Dr. Bruce E. Maryanoff on May 15, 1971.

Maryanoff received a B.S. degree in chemistry in 1972 from Drexel University, and a Ph.D. degree in organic chemistry in 1976 from Princeton University, working with Kurt Mislow. From 1976 to 1977 she was a postdoctoral fellow in the department of chemistry at Princeton University, working with Edward C. Taylor.

== Career ==
She joined Smith, Kline & French Laboratories in 1977 and moved to McNeil Pharmaceutical, a Johnson & Johnson subsidiary in 1981. She served as global head of chemical and pharmaceutical development in preclinical development from 2000 to 2004, which was responsible for moving new chemical entities from small-scale to large-scale chemical synthesis, for analytical methods, and establishing oral formulations for early human studies. Maryanoff advanced through various Johnson & Johnson pharmaceutical units to the highest scientific position in the company.

In 2004 she moved to Cordis (medical) Corporation, a Johnson & Johnson medical device unit, as a distinguished research fellow in the Cordis facility in Spring House, Pennsylvania. She retired from Johnson & Johnson in 2013. She then became a Distinguished Professor at the Baruch S. Blumberg Institute (Doylestown, Pennsylvania).

Maryanoff has been active in the fields of organic chemistry and materials science. Her publication record includes more than 100 scientific papers and several books. She is listed as an inventor on 67 U.S. or European patents, issued or pending.

Maryanoff emphasizes that accomplishments in process chemistry depend upon the work of teams of people who are involved in the research. As a scientist and group leader she has been influential in creating drug candidates for a variety of conditions, including antipsychotics, antiepileptics, antiviral agents, and treatments for cardiovascular disease and female reproductive diseases. She has also worked on the transdermal delivery of narcotics, pulmonary surfactants, endocrine function, and Cordis drug-eluting stents. The more than 1,000 drug candidates she has been involved in developing include the anti-epileptic Topamax, and an atypical analgesic, Ultram/Tramadol, for treating pain.

She has been active in the American Chemical Society (ACS) in many positions including national election to the Executive Committee of the Division of Organic Chemistry (DOC) (1988–2018). She was the first woman to be chair of the Division of Organic Chemistry (DOC) (1997). She has served on a variety of other committees including the Advisory Board of Chemical & Engineering News, the International Activities Committee (2014-2022), and the ACS Governing Board of Publishing (2015-2023). As well as the ACS, she has been active on the NSF Postdoctoral Research Fellowship Review Panel, the NIH Division of Grants, and the NCI Committee for Proposals to Synthesize Pharmaceutical Agents.

== Memberships and fellowships ==
- member of the Philadelphia section of the American Chemical Society (ACS)
- member of the Philadelphia Organic Chemists Club (POCC)
- fellow of the American Institute of Chemists
- fellow of the American Association for the Advancement of Science
- fellow of the American Chemical Society (ACS): She was one of 162 members chosen for the inaugural group of fellows.

== Awards ==
Maryanoff is the recipient of numerous awards, including the Philadelphia Section Award from American Chemical Society (1991); Garvan–Olin Medal from the American Chemical Society (1999); Philadelphia Organic Chemists' Club Award (1999); the Earle B. Barnes Award for Leadership in Chemical Research Management, a national award of the American Chemical Society (2005); the Henry F. Whalen, Jr. Award for Business Development from the American Chemical Society Division of Business Development and Management (2007); the Anthony J. and Heand Silvestri Award (2008); and the Ronald Mitsch Award (2008). In 2003, she was inducted into the Drexel 100. In 2010, she received the Elizabeth Bingham Award from the Philadelphia Chapter of the Association for Women in Science (AWIS-PHL), recognizing her contributions to the advancement of women in science. She and her husband Bruce E. Maryanoff are co-recipients of the 2015 Hepatitis B Foundation Community Commitment Award. In 2015 Cynthia Maryanoff received the Perkin Medal for outstanding work in applied chemistry in the U.S.A. In 2018 Maryanoff received the Paul G. Gassman Distinguished Service Award from the Division of Organic Chemistry of the American Chemical Society. Cynthia A Maryanoff received the 2022 Drexel Golden Dragon Society Award.
