= Prince Chunk =

Domestic shorthair cat, known for his heavy weight

- Other names: Powder, Princess Chunk, Captain Chunk
- Species: Tabby cat
- Sex: Male
- Born: Powder; 1998; Voorhees, New Jersey, U.S.
- Died: November 21, 2010 (aged 12); Voorhees, New Jersey
- Owner: Donna Damiani
- Weight: 44 lb (20 kg) (around 22 lb (10 kg) before death)

Prince Chunk (also known as Princess Chunk and Captain Chunk, real name: Powder) (1998 – November 21, 2010) was a domestic shorthair cat, who at one time was alleged to weigh 44 pounds (20 kg), a world record. He was found in Voorhees, New Jersey, on July 26, 2008, by Animal Control, who nicknamed him "Captain Chunk". After a search for his owner, it was found that his name was Powder and that he was abandoned by Donna Oklatner, an elderly Voorhees resident. Oklatner claimed she could not afford to take care of the cat when she lost her home in foreclosure proceedings.

He was later adopted from the Camden County Animal Shelter in New Jersey by Donna Damiani of Blackwood, New Jersey, and in August 2008 his weight was already down to 22 pounds.

According to the Guinness World Records, the largest tabby cat was forty-six pounds and fifteen ounces. Since then, the publishers have dropped the category to prevent deliberate overfeeding and possible harm to cats.

He made television appearances on Live with Regis and Kelly, Good Morning America, Fox News, and MSNBC, based on his reported weight, but reliable sources of the cat's definitive weight in July 2008 are not available. One paper reported that "shelter officials said they were perplexed by the discrepancy", after the Damiani family found that the cat weighed just over 22 pounds, "days after" receiving him. The Damiani family later founded the Prince Chunk Foundation, a nonprofit that allows people to keep their pets in difficult financial situations by giving them free pet food and vet care.

Prince Chunk died in his sleep on November 21, 2010, due to heart disease.

== See also ==
- Meow (cat)
- Obesity in pets
- List of individual cats
