= Microsomal triglyceride transfer protein =

Large subunit of microsomal triglyceride transfer protein

MTTP
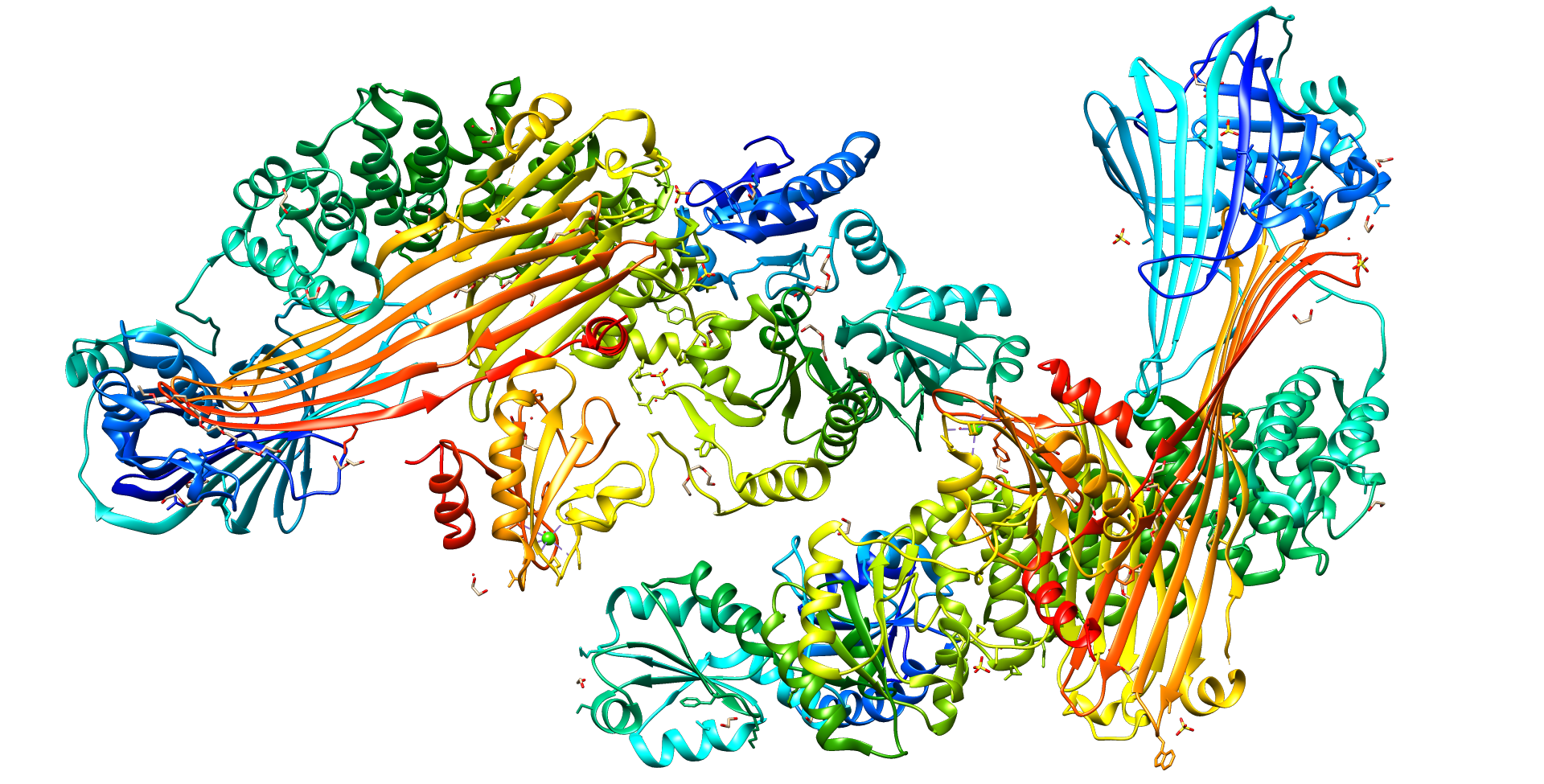
Available structures
PDB	Ortholog search: PDBe RCSB
PDB	List of PDB id codes 6I7S, 8EOJ

Identifiers
- Aliases: MTTP, ABL, MTP, Microsomal triglyceride transfer protein
- External IDs: OMIM: 157147; MGI: 106926; HomoloGene: 212; GeneCards: MTTP; OMA:MTTP - orthologs

Gene location (Human)
Chr.	Chromosome 4 (human)
Band	4q23	Start	99,564,081 bp
Band	4q23	End	99,623,997 bp

Gene location (Mouse)
Chr.	Chromosome 3 (mouse)
Band	3 G3|3 64.06 cM	Start	137,795,615 bp
Band	3 G3|3 64.06 cM	End	137,850,729 bp
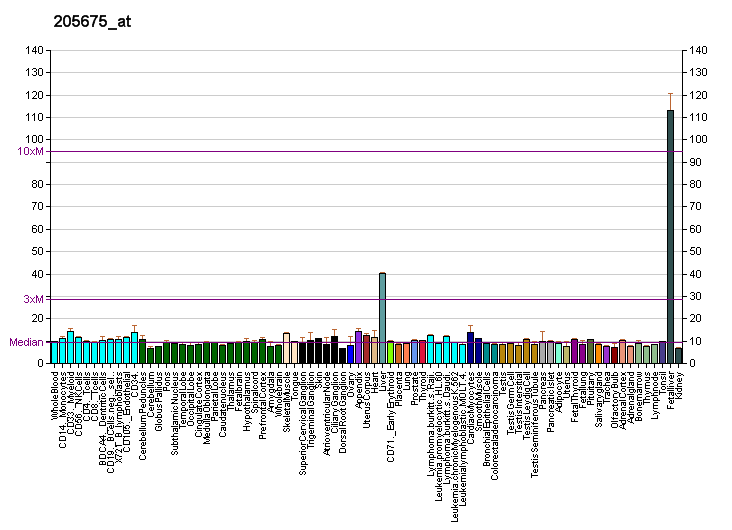
RNA expression pattern
Bgee	Human / Mouse (ortholog); Top expressed in: jejunal mucosa; mucosa of ileum; liver; duodenum; right lobe of liver; testicle; ventricular zone; kidney tubule; gonad; human kidney / Top expressed in: jejunum; duodenum; migratory enteric neural crest cell; left lobe of liver; ileum; yolk sac; spermatocyte; intestinal epithelium; crypt of lieberkuhn of small intestine; spermatid; More reference expression data
BioGPS	More reference expression data
Gene ontology
Molecular function	protein heterodimerization activity; protein binding; phospholipid transporter activity; lipid binding; lipid transporter activity
Cellular component	receptor complex; endoplasmic reticulum lumen; endoplasmic reticulum; Golgi apparatus; basolateral plasma membrane
Biological process	phospholipid transport; lipid transport; plasma lipoprotein particle assembly; lipid metabolism; protein secretion; triglyceride transport; chylomicron assembly; very-low-density lipoprotein particle assembly; lipoprotein metabolic process; cholesterol homeostasis
Sources:Amigo / QuickGO
Orthologs
Species	Human	Mouse
Entrez	4547	17777
Ensembl	ENSG00000138823	ENSMUSG00000028158
UniProt	P55157	O08601
RefSeq (mRNA)	NM_001300785; NM_000253; NM_001386140	NM_001163457; NM_008642; NM_001355051; NM_001355052
RefSeq (protein)	NP_000244; NP_001287714	NP_001156929; NP_032668; NP_001341980; NP_001341981
Location (UCSC)	Chr 4: 99.56 – 99.62 Mb	Chr 3: 137.8 – 137.85 Mb
PubMed search
- Wikidata
View/Edit Human	View/Edit Mouse

Microsomal triglyceride transfer protein large subunit is a protein that in humans is encoded by the MTTP, also known as MTP, gene.

MTTP encodes the large subunit of the heterodimeric microsomal triglyceride transfer protein (MTP). Protein disulfide isomerase (PDI) completes the heterodimeric MTP, which has been shown to play a central role in lipoprotein assembly. Mutations in MTTP can cause abetalipoproteinemia.

Apolipoprotein B48 on chylomicra and Apolipoprotein B100 on LDL, IDL, and VLDL are important for MTP binding.

MTP adds triglycerides to nascent chylomicrons in the intestine, and to VLDL in the liver.

== Structure ==
The large subunit of MTP, also known as the alpha subunit, contains an N-terminal half beta barrel, an alpha helix and a C-terminal lipid binding site that lies between two beta pleated sheets. It is a member of the large lipid transfer protein family, like apolipoprotein B (apo B), with which it interacts, but unlike apo B, it is not secreted. The heterodimer is instead retained in the endoplasmic reticulum due to the presence of a C-terminal KDEL motif on the PDI beta subunit.

== Interactive pathway map ==
Click on genes, proteins and metabolites below to link to respective articles. (Note: The interactive pathway map can be edited at WikiPathways: "Statin_Pathway_WP430".)

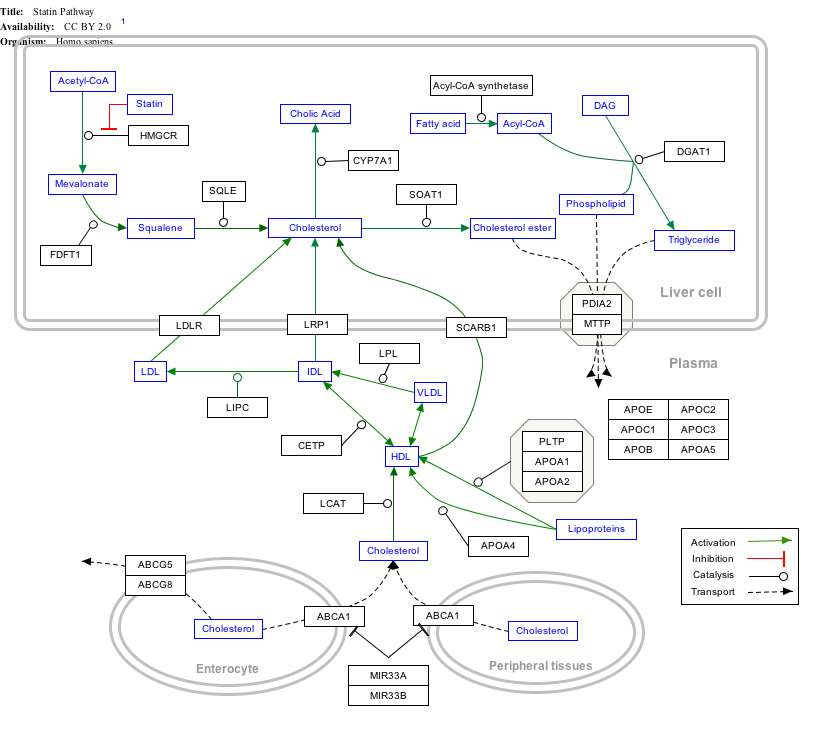

Statin pathway edit

== Pharmacology ==
Drugs that inhibit MTTP prevent the assembly of apo B-containing lipoproteins thus inhibiting the synthesis of chylomicrons and VLDL and leading to decrease in plasma levels of LDL-C.

- Lomitapide (Juxtapid) was approved by the US FDA for adjunctive treatment of homozygous familial hypercholesterolemia.
- Dirlotapide (Slentrol) and mitratapide (Yarvitan) are veterinary drugs for the management of obesity in dogs.
