= Meow (cat) =

Cat known for obesity (c. 2010–2012)

- Meow in April 2012, one month before his death
- Species: Felis catus
- Sex: Male
- Born: c. 2010
- Died: May 5, 2012 (aged 1–2); Santa Fe, New Mexico, United States
- Cause of death: Lung failure
- Years active: 2011–2012
- Known for: Heaviest domestic cat at time of death

Meow (c. 2010 – May 5, 2012), also known as Meow the obese cat, was a male domestic cat who attracted international attention when an animal shelter publicized efforts to slim him down, in an attempt to have him adopted. However, Meow died of lung failure two weeks after entering the animal shelter, on May 5, 2012. He was the world's heaviest cat at his time of death, weighing 39.7 pounds (18.0 kilograms).

== Weight ==
Domestic cats are as large as most other members of the genus Felis, typically weighing between 4 kilograms (8.8 lb) and 5 kilograms (11 lb). Meow weighed 18.0 kilograms (39.7 lb), the heaviest cat in the world—though not on record. Himmy, a cat from Australia, had weighed 21.3 kilograms (46.8 pounds) upon dying during his tenth year, in 1986. Guinness World Records has since retired the title to discourage deliberate overfeeding.

Being the world's heaviest cat, Meow occasionally appeared on U.S. television shows. In 2010 he was featured on an episode of Anderson Live, which was hosted by U.S. television personality Anderson Cooper. Meow was again featured on Anderson Live on April 30, 2012, with Cooper carrying the cat.

== Weight loss and death ==
Meow was moved to the Santa Fe Animal Shelter & Humane Society two weeks before he died because his 87-year-old owner could no longer care for him. The animal shelter fed Meow a strict high-protein diet to slim him. The shelter also planned to publicize Meow and his diet on their Facebook page. Meow's publicity was expected to arouse interest in his adoption.

He lost two pounds (0.9 kilograms) at the animal shelter, and the shelter planned to make him lose at least eight more (3.6 kilograms) so he could be adopted. However, Meow contracted breathing problems by May 2, 2012; after undergoing a battery of tests, which included X-ray and cardiac ultrasound, he was put on oxygen therapy. Two days later, Meow was brought to a veterinary hospital to undergo emergency treatment: four veterinarians tried to save him, but he died on the afternoon of the following day.

== See also ==
- Obesity in pets
- Corduroy (cat)
- Prince Chunk
- List of individual cats
