= Lomitapide =

Chemical compound

Clinical data
- Trade names: Juxtapid (US), Lojuxta (EU)
- Other names: AEGR-773, BMS-201038
- License data: EU EMA: by INN; US DailyMed: Lomitapide; US FDA: Lomitapide
- Routes of administration: By mouth
- ATC code: C10AX12 (WHO)

Legal status
- Legal status: US: ℞-only; EU: Rx-only

Identifiers
- IUPAC name: N-(2,2,2-Trifluoroethyl)-9-[4-[4-[[[4'-(trifluoromethyl)[1,1'-biphenyl]2-yl]carbonyl]amino]-1-piperidinyl]butyl]-9H-fluoren-9-carboxamide
- CAS Number: 182431-12-5; mesylate: 202914-84-9
- PubChem CID: 9853053; mesylate: 11274333
- IUPHAR/BPS: 7439
- DrugBank: DB08827; mesylate: DBSALT000110
- ChemSpider: 8028764; mesylate: 9449335
- UNII: 82KUB0583F; mesylate: X4S83CP54E
- KEGG: D09637; mesylate: D09638
- ChEBI: CHEBI:72297; mesylate: CHEBI:72299
- ChEMBL: ChEMBL354541; mesylate: ChEMBL2105662
- CompTox Dashboard (EPA): DTXSID50171294

Chemical and physical data
- Formula: C_{39}H_{37}F_{6}N_{3}O_{2}
- Molar mass: 693.734 g·mol^{−1}
- 3D model (JSmol): Interactive image
- SMILES: FC(F)(F)c5ccc(cc5)-c1ccccc1C(=O)NC4CCN(CC4)CCCCC2(C(=O)NCC(F)(F)F)c3ccccc3-c6ccccc26
- InChI: InChI=1S/C39H37F6N3O2/c40-38(41,42)25-46-36(50)37(33-13-5-3-10-30(33)31-11-4-6-14-34(31)37)21-7-8-22-48-23-19-28(20-24-48)47-35(49)32-12-2-1-9-29(32)26-15-17-27(18-16-26)39(43,44)45/h1-6,9-18,28H,7-8,19-25H2,(H,46,50)(H,47,49); Key:MBBCVAKAJPKAKM-UHFFFAOYSA-N

Lomitapide, sold under the brand name Juxtapid in the US and Lojuxta in the EU, is a medication used as a lipid-lowering agent for the treatment of familial hypercholesterolemia, developed by Aegerion Pharmaceuticals. It has been tested in clinical trials as single treatment and in combinations with atorvastatin, ezetimibe and fenofibrate.

The US Food and Drug Administration (FDA) approved lomitapide in December 2012, as an orphan drug to reduce LDL cholesterol, total cholesterol, apolipoprotein B, and non-high-density lipoprotein (non-HDL) cholesterol in people with homozygous familial hypercholesterolemia (HoFH).

In July 2013, the European Commission approved lomitapide as an adjunct to a low-fat diet and other lipid-lowering medicinal products with or without low density lipoprotein (LDL) apheresis in adults with HoFH.

== Mechanism of action ==
Lomitapide inhibits the microsomal triglyceride transfer protein (MTP or MTTP) which is necessary for very low-density lipoprotein (VLDL) assembly and secretion in the liver.

In December 2012, drug manufacturer Aegerion announced they had been approved by the FDA to as "an adjunct to a low-fat diet and other lipid-lowering treatments...in patients with homozygous familial hypercholesterolemia (HoFH)."

== Side effects ==
In a Phase III study, lomitapide led to elevated aminotransferase levels and fat accumulation in the liver.
