= ATC code A08 =

ATC code A08 Antiobesity preparations, excluding diet products is a therapeutic subgroup of the Anatomical Therapeutic Chemical Classification System, a system of alphanumeric codes developed by the World Health Organization (WHO) for the classification of drugs and other medical products. Subgroup A08 is part of the anatomical group A Alimentary tract and metabolism.

Codes for veterinary use (ATCvet codes) can be created by placing the letter Q in front of the human ATC code: for example, QA08. ATCvet codes without corresponding human ATC codes are cited with the leading Q in the following list.
National versions of the ATC classification may include additional codes not present in this list, which follows the WHO version.

== A08A Antiobesity preparations, excluding diet products ==
=== A08AA Centrally acting antiobesity products ===
A08AA01 Phentermine
A08AA02 Fenfluramine
A08AA03 Amfepramone
A08AA04 Dexfenfluramine
A08AA05 Mazindol
A08AA06 Etilamfetamine
A08AA07 Cathine
A08AA08 Clobenzorex
A08AA09 Mefenorex
A08AA10 Sibutramine
A08AA11 Lorcaserin
A08AA12 Setmelanotide
A08AA51 Phentermine and topiramate
A08AA56 Ephedrine, combinations
A08AA62 Bupropion and naltrexone

=== A08AB Peripherally acting antiobesity products ===
A08AB01 Orlistat
QA08AB90 Mitratapide
QA08AB91 Dirlotapide

=== A08AX Other antiobesity drugs ===
A08AX01 Rimonabant

== See also ==
- Diet products are in the ATC group V06A.
