= Mitratapide =

Chemical compound

Clinical data
- Trade names: Yarvitan
- Other names: Mitratapid; R103757
- Routes of administration: By mouth
- ATCvet code: QA08AB90 (WHO)

Legal status
- Legal status: CA: ℞-only

Pharmacokinetic data
- Bioavailability: 55–69%
- Protein binding: >99.9%
- Metabolism: Extensive liver (sulfoxidation); first pass effect
- Elimination half-life: 6.3 hours (mitratapide), up to 44.7 hours (metabolites)
- Excretion: Feces (80–90%)

Identifiers
- IUPAC name: 2-[(2R)-Butan-2-yl]-4-[4-[4-[4-[[(2S,4R)-2-(4-chlorophenyl)-2-[(4-methyl-1,2,4-triazol-3-yl)sulfanylmethyl]-1,3-dioxolan-4-yl]methoxy]phenyl]piperazin-1-yl]phenyl]-1,2,4-triazol-3-one
- CAS Number: 179602-65-4
- PubChem CID: 213047
- ChemSpider: 184740
- UNII: FVW7T75XP4
- KEGG: D05060
- CompTox Dashboard (EPA): DTXSID801016298

Chemical and physical data
- Formula: C_{36}H_{41}ClN_{8}O_{4}S
- Molar mass: 717.29 g·mol^{−1}
- 3D model (JSmol): Interactive image
- SMILES: CC[C@@H](C)N1C(=O)N(C=N1)C2=CC=C(C=C2)N3CCN(CC3)C4=CC=C(C=C4)OC[C@@H]5CO[C@@](O5)(CSC6=NN=CN6C)C7=CC=C(C=C7)Cl
- InChI: InChI=1S/C36H41ClN8O4S/c1-4-26(2)45-35(46)44(25-39-45)31-11-9-29(10-12-31)42-17-19-43(20-18-42)30-13-15-32(16-14-30)47-21-33-22-48-36(49-33,27-5-7-28(37)8-6-27)23-50-34-40-38-24-41(34)3/h5-16,24-26,33H,4,17-23H2,1-3H3/t26-,33-,36-/m1/s1; Key:HQSRVYUCBOCBLY-XOOFNSLWSA-N

Mitratapide is a veterinary medication used for the treatment of overweight and obese dogs sold under the brand name Yarvitan. Its mechanism of action involves inhibition of microsomal triglyceride transfer protein (MTP) which is responsible for the absorption of dietary lipids. Clinical study also suggests that mitratapide may help to reverse insulin resistance in dogs.

The drug was developed by Janssen Pharmaceutica and is chemically related to the antifungal drugs such as itraconazole which were also developed by Janssen.

Mitratapide (under the brand name Yarvitan) was authorized for use in the EU by the European Medicines Agency for helping weight loss in dogs, but it has since been withdrawn from the market in the EU.
