= Bruce E. Maryanoff =

American chemist

Bruce Eliot Maryanoff FRSC (born February 26, 1947, in Philadelphia, Pennsylvania) is an American medicinal and organic chemist.

== Background and contributions ==
Maryanoff received a B.S. degree in chemistry in 1969, and a PhD degree in organic chemistry in 1972, both from Drexel University. From 1972 to 1974 Maryanoff was a postdoctoral fellow in the department of chemistry at Princeton University. He joined McNeil Laboratories, Inc., a Johnson & Johnson subsidiary, in 1974 and advanced on the scientific ladder in various Johnson & Johnson pharmaceutical units to the highest scientific position in the company. Maryanoff retired from Johnson & Johnson Pharmaceutical Research & Development, Spring House, Pennsylvania, in January 2010. He is now affiliated with The Scripps Research Institute, La Jolla, California and is a Distinguished Professor at the Baruch S. Blumberg Institute, Doylestown, Pennsylvania. He served as associate editor for the journal ACS Medicinal Chemistry Letters from 2009-2020. He is married to Dr. Cynthia A. Maryanoff.

Maryanoff has been active in the fields of medicinal chemistry and organic chemistry. He is an inventor of topiramate, a unique sugar sulfamate drug, which has been marketed worldwide for the treatment of epilepsy and migraine, attaining annual sales of more than $2 billion. Topiramate is also a principal component of the antiobesity drug Qsymia. Maryanoff is an internationally renowned expert in drug design and drug discovery, especially in the application of protein structure-based drug design. He made seminal contributions to understanding the stereochemistry and mechanism of the Wittig reaction; adapted the cobalt-catalyzed alkyne trimerization to the synthesis of macrocycles; and devised novel peptides that undergo self-assembly to mimic native collagen structurally and functionally. Maryanoff is an author on 280 scientific publications, including several books (editor), book chapters, and review articles. He is an inventor on 100 issued U.S. patents, has presented over 185 invited lectures worldwide, and mentored 11 postdoctoral associates. Maryanoff organized and edited a special memorial issue of the Journal of Medicinal Chemistry to honor the memory of Dr. Paul Janssen (2005) and has served on numerous editorial advisory boards for scientific journals and research grant review committees.

== Awards and honors ==
- Johnson & Johnson's Philip B. Hofmann Research Scientist Award, 1978
- 23rd Achievement Award of the Philadelphia Section of the American Chemical Society (ACS), 1984
- Johnson & Johnson's Philip B. Hofmann Research Scientist Award, 1987
- Fellow, American Association for the Advancement of Science (AAAS), 1989
- Distinguished Chemistry Alumni Award from Drexel University, 1994
- Philadelphia Organic Chemists' Club (POCC) Award, 1995
- Johnson & Johnson's Johnson Medal for Research and Development, 1997
- Organic Syntheses Distinguished Lecture Award, Colorado State University, department of chemistry, 1998
- Distinguished Alumni Achievement Award for Service to the Profession, Drexel University, 1999
- American Chemical Society Heroes of Chemistry 2000 Award, 2000
- Fellow, Royal Society of Chemistry (RSC), 2000
- American Chemical Society Award in Industrial Chemistry, 2003
- National Commission for Cooperative Education Co-op Hall of Fame, Class of 2002–2003.
- Drexel 100, 2003
- Wyeth Lecture Award, Temple University, school of pharmacy, 2007
- ACS Division of Medicinal Chemistry Hall of Fame, 2008
- American Chemical Society Division of Medicinal Chemistry Edward E. Smissman Award, sponsored by Bristol-Myers Squibb, 2009
- Fellow, American Chemical Society, 2009
- Prix Paul Ehrlich, from Société de Chimie Thérapeutique (SCT), 2010
- American Chemical Society E.B. Hershberg Award for Important Discoveries in Medicinally Active Substances, 2013
