= Phentermine/topiramate =

Obesity medication

Combination of
- Phentermine: Appetite suppressant/stimulant of the amphetamine and phenethylamine class
- Topiramate: Anticonvulsant (extended release formulation is used)

Clinical data
- Pronunciation: /kjuːsɪˈmiːə/ kew-sim-EE-ə
- Trade names: Qsymia
- AHFS/Drugs.com: Professional Drug Facts
- Routes of administration: By mouth
- ATC code: A08AA51 (WHO) QA08AA51 (WHO)

Legal status
- Legal status: US: Schedule IV; In general: ℞ (Prescription only)

Identifiers
- CAS Number: 960078-81-3
- PubChem CID: 56842108
- KEGG: D11710
- CompTox Dashboard (EPA): DTXSID20242081

Phentermine/topiramate, sold under the brand name Qsymia, is a combination drug of phentermine and topiramate used to treat obesity. It is used together with dietary changes and exercise. If less than 3% weight loss is seen after 3 months, it is recommended that the medication be stopped. The weight loss is modest. Effects on heart-related health problems or death are unclear.

Common side effects include tingling, dizziness, trouble sleeping, and constipation. Serious side effects may include suicide, abuse. Use is not recommended during pregnancy. Phentermine is a stimulant and appetite suppressant. Topiramate is an anticonvulsant that has weight loss side effects. The exact mechanism of action for both drugs is unknown.

Phentermine/topiramate was approved for medical use in the United States in 2012. In October 2012, approval was denied in Europe due to safety concerns.

== Medical uses ==
In clinical trials, people treated with the highest dose of phentermine/topiramate ER, in combination with a diet-and-exercise program, lost 10% to 11% of their body weight, compared with 1% to 2% for those who received a placebo. In addition, 62% to 70% of subjects receiving the recommended dose or top dose of phentermine/topiramate ER achieved ≥5% weight reduction by week 56 (ITT-LOCF) compared to 17% to 21% of those receiving a placebo.

A Cochrane review on the long-term effects of weight-reducing drugs on people with hypertension found that phentermine/topiramate reduced body weight (when compared to orlistat, and naltrexone/bupropion) and also reduced blood pressure.

== Adverse effects ==
In clinical trials, the most common adverse events which occurred at a rate ≥5% and ≥1.5 times placebo included paraesthesia (tingling in fingers/toes), dizziness, altered taste, insomnia, constipation, and dry mouth.

In the US, the drug label contains warnings for increased heart rate, suicidal behavior and ideation, glaucoma, mood and sleep disorders, creatinine elevation, and metabolic acidosis. Some of these warnings are based on historical observations in epilepsy patients taking topiramate. The FDA is requiring the company to perform a post-approval cardiovascular outcomes trial, due in part to the observation of increased heart rate in some people taking the drug in clinical trials.

=== Pregnancy ===
Phentermine and topiramate can cause fetal harm. Data from pregnancy registries and epidemiology studies indicate that a fetus exposed to topiramate in the first trimester of pregnancy has an increased risk of oral clefts (cleft lip with or without cleft palate). If a patient becomes pregnant while taking phentermine/topiramate ER, treatment should be discontinued immediately, and the patient should be apprised of the potential hazard to a fetus. Females of reproductive potential should have a negative pregnancy test before starting phentermine/topiramate ER and monthly thereafter during phentermine/topiramate ER therapy. Females of reproductive potential should use effective contraception during phentermine/topiramate ER therapy.

=== Risk evaluation and mitigation strategy ===
Phentermine and topiramate was approved with a risk evaluation and mitigation strategy (REMS) program to ensure that benefits of treatment outweigh the risks.

== Contraindications ==
Phentermine/topiramate ER is contraindicated in pregnancy, glaucoma, hyperthyroidism, during or within 14 days of taking monoamine oxidase inhibitors, and in patients with hypersensitivity or idiosyncrasy to sympathomimetic amines. Phentermine/topiramate ER can cause an increase in resting heart rate.

== History ==
Phentermine and topiramate was developed by Vivus, a California pharmaceutical company.

In December 2009, Vivus, Inc. submitted a new drug application (NDA) to the FDA and on 1 March 2010, Vivus, Inc. announced that the FDA accepted the NDA for review.

In October 2010, the FDA announced its decision to not approve phentermine/topiramate ER in its current form and issued a Complete Response Letter to Vivus due to lack of long-term data and concerns about side effects including elevated heart rate, major adverse cardiovascular events, and birth defects.

In January 2011, the FDA expressed concerns about the potential for phentermine/topiramate ER to cause birth defects and requested that Vivus assess the feasibility of analyzing existing healthcare databases to determine the historical incidence of oral cleft in offspring of women treated with topiramate for migraine prophylaxis (100 mg).

In October 2011, Vivus resubmitted the NDA to the FDA with responses to the issues addressed in the CRL and the FDA accepted the NDA in November 2011.

In September 2012, Qsymia became available on the US market.

In October 2012, approval was denied in the European Union, due to concerns regarding safety.
