= ATC code V06 =

ATC code V06 General nutrients is a therapeutic subgroup of the Anatomical Therapeutic Chemical Classification System, a system of alphanumeric codes developed by the World Health Organization (WHO) for the classification of drugs and other medical products. Subgroup V06 is part of the anatomical group V Various.

Codes for veterinary use (ATCvet codes) can be created by placing the letter Q in front of the human ATC code: for example, QV06.
National versions of the ATC classification may include additional codes not present in this list, which follows the WHO version.

== V06B Protein supplements ==
Empty group

== V06D Other nutrients ==
=== V06DC Carbohydrates ===
V06DC01 Glucose
V06DC02 Fructose
