= Leo Lutwak =

American scientist (1928–2006)

Leo Lutwak (March 27, 1928 – February 23, 2006) was an American nutritionist, endocrinologist, and biochemist specializing in bariatrics. He was a medical officer with the Food and Drug Administration.

== Life ==
Born in the Bronx in 1928, Leo Lutwak attended the City College of New York, graduating cum laude. In 1946, he obtained a Master's degree in biochemistry from the University of Wisconsin-Madison and a Ph.D. in the same discipline in 1951, from the University of Michigan. In 1956, he got his M.D. from the Yale School of Medicine.

Lutwak went on to work for the National Institute of Arthritis and Metabolic Diseases from 1960 to 1963 and later for the Food and Drug Administration, in 1989. During his time there, he raised early concerns about fen-phen, an anti-obesity treatment found to increase risk of heart disease. Between 1963 and 1972, he worked at Cornell University, studying the role of calcium in osteoporosis and the physiological effects of weightlessness. After the 1976 death of his first wife, he remarried. His second wife later divorced him. Lutwak retired in 2004 and died of pneumonia in 2006.
