= Dirlotapide =

Chemical compound

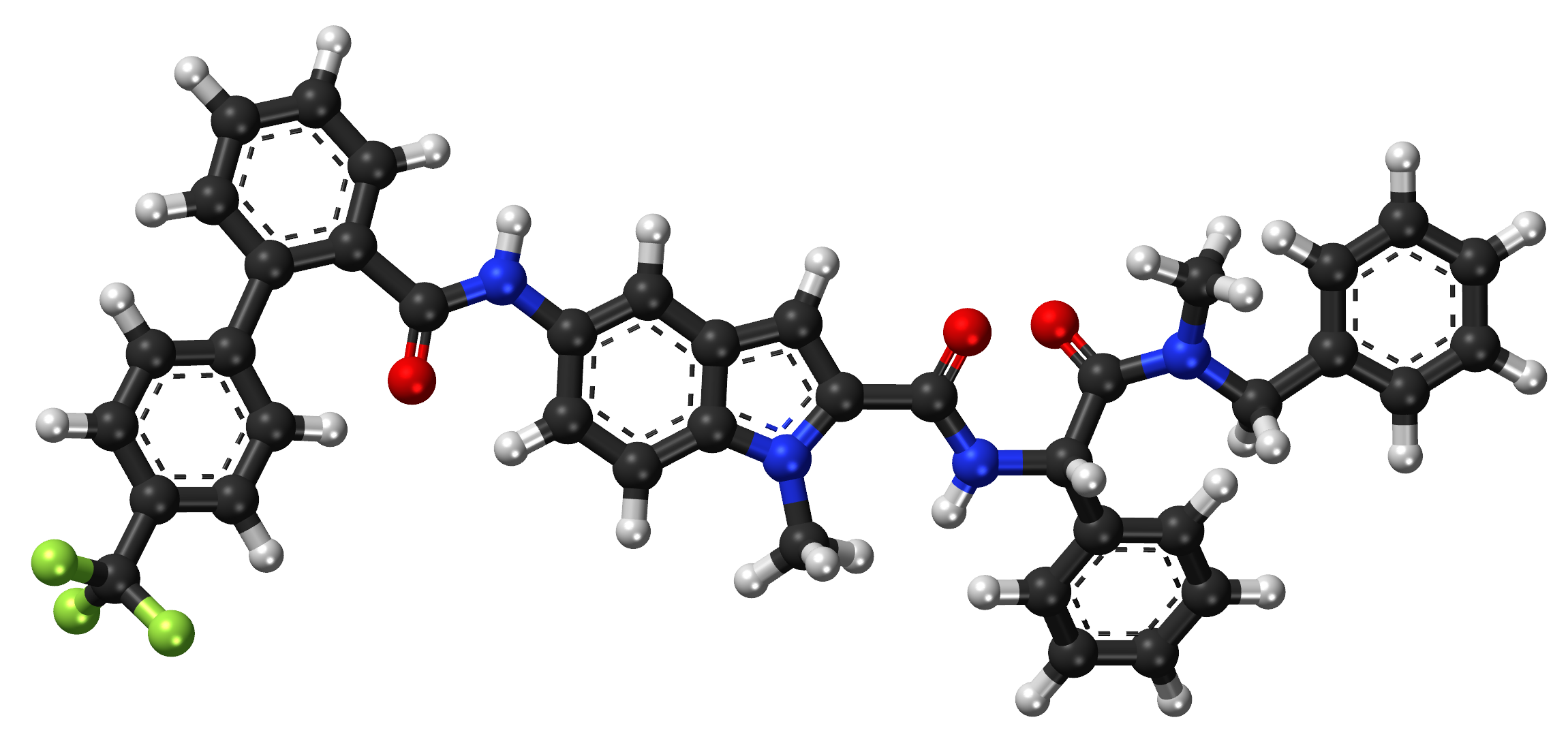

Clinical data
- Trade names: Slentrol
- AHFS/Drugs.com: International Drug Names
- Routes of administration: By mouth
- ATCvet code: QA08AB91 (WHO)

Legal status
- Legal status: CA: ℞-only; US: ℞-only

Pharmacokinetic data
- Protein binding: High
- Metabolism: Liver
- Elimination half-life: 5–18 hours (increased with repeated dosing)
- Excretion: Feces, urine

Identifiers
- IUPAC name: 1-Methyl-N-[(1S)-2-(methyl-(phenylmethyl)amino)-2-oxo-1-phenylethyl]-5-[[oxo-[2-[4-(trifluoromethyl)phenyl]phenyl]methyl]amino]-2-indolecarboxamide
- CAS Number: 481658-94-0
- PubChem CID: 9917862
- ChemSpider: 8093509
- UNII: 578H0RMP25
- KEGG: D03867
- ChEMBL: ChEMBL410414
- CompTox Dashboard (EPA): DTXSID00897432

Chemical and physical data
- Formula: C_{40}H_{33}F_{3}N_{4}O_{3}
- Molar mass: 674.724 g·mol^{−1}
- 3D model (JSmol): Interactive image
- SMILES: FC(F)(F)c1ccc(cc1)c2ccccc2C(=O)Nc3cc4c(cc3)n(c(c4)C(=O)N[C@@H](c5ccccc5)C(=O)N(Cc6ccccc6)C)C
- InChI: InChI=1S/C40H33F3N4O3/c1-46(25-26-11-5-3-6-12-26)39(50)36(28-13-7-4-8-14-28)45-38(49)35-24-29-23-31(21-22-34(29)47(35)2)44-37(48)33-16-10-9-15-32(33)27-17-19-30(20-18-27)40(41,42)43/h3-24,36H,25H2,1-2H3,(H,44,48)(H,45,49)/t36-/m0/s1; Key:TUOSYWCFRFNJBS-BHVANESWSA-N

Dirlotapide is a drug used to treat obesity in dogs. It is manufactured by Pfizer and Zoetis and marketed under the brand name Slentrol.

It works as a gut-selective microsomal triglyceride transfer protein (MTTP or MTP) inhibitor. This blocks the assembly and release of lipoproteins into the bloodstream, thereby reducing fat absorption. It also elicits a satiety signal from lipid-filled cells lining the intestine.

== Usage ==
It is supplied as an oral solution. It is not intended for use in humans, cats, birds, rodents, or other animals.

Dirlotapide is used to manage obesity in dogs and helps by reducing appetite. It is used as part of an overall weight control program that also includes proper diet and exercise, under the supervision of a veterinarian. Side effects may include vomiting, diarrhea, lethargy, drooling, or uncoordination. Allergic reaction to the medication may include, facial swelling, hives, scratching, sudden onset of diarrhea, vomiting, shock, seizures, pale gums, cold limbs, or coma.

== Regulation and safety ==
On January 5, 2007, the U.S. Food and Drug Administration (FDA) approved Slentrol, the first time the FDA has approved a drug for obese dogs.

However, concerns have since been raised, since 2010, about adverse effects that might more strongly affect particular breeds.

Dirlotapide (under the brand name Slentrol) was authorized for use in the EU by the European Medicines Agency for helping weight loss in dogs, but has since been withdrawn from the market in the EU.
