= Kurt Mislow =

- Born: 5 June 1923; Berlin, Germany
- Died: 5 October 2017 (aged 94); Princeton, N.J.
- Education: BA, Tulane University, 1944 PhD, California Institute of Technology, 1947
- Known for: Stereochemistry
- Scientific career
- Workplaces: New York University, Princeton University
- Doctoral advisor: Linus Pauling

Kurt Martin Mislow (June 5, 1923 – October 5, 2017) was a German-born American organic chemist who specialized in stereochemistry.

== Early life and education ==
Born in Berlin on June 5, 1923, Mislow had moved to London by 1938, after some time in Milan. With the help of his uncle Alfred Eisenstaedt, Mislow's family left London for New York City in 1940. Mislow earned a bachelor's degree in chemistry from Tulane University in 1944, and received a doctorate from the California Institute of Technology, where he was supervised by Linus Pauling. His thesis was entitled: I. The Synthesis of Potential Antimaterials. Some 2-Substituted 8-(3-Diethylaminopropylaminol)-Quinolines. II. Isomorphism in Relation to Serological Specificity. III. A Study of the Hammick Reaction.

== Career and research ==
Mislow first taught at New York University, then moved to Princeton University in 1964. While at Princeton, Mislow served as Hugh Stott Taylor Professor of Chemistry and led the chemistry department from 1968 to 1974. He became a professor emeritus in 1988.

== Awards and honors ==
Over the course of his career, Mislow was named a Guggenheim fellow twice, in 1956 and 1974. Between 1959 and 1963, Mislow was granted the Sloan Research Fellowship. He became a member of the National Academy of Sciences in 1972, followed by fellowships in the American Academy of Arts and Sciences, granted in 1974, and the American Association for the Advancement of Science, bestowed in 1980. In 1999, Mislow was named a foreign member of the Accademia dei Lincei. The American Chemical Society honored Mislow with several awards, among them the James Flack Norris Award in Physical Organic Chemistry (1975), the William H. Nichols Medal Award (1987), and the Arthur C. Cope Scholar Award (1995).

== Personal life ==
Mislow died at the age of 94 years on Oct. 5, 2017. He was survived by his wife, son, and two grandsons.
