= Topiramate =

Medication used to treat epilepsy and migraine

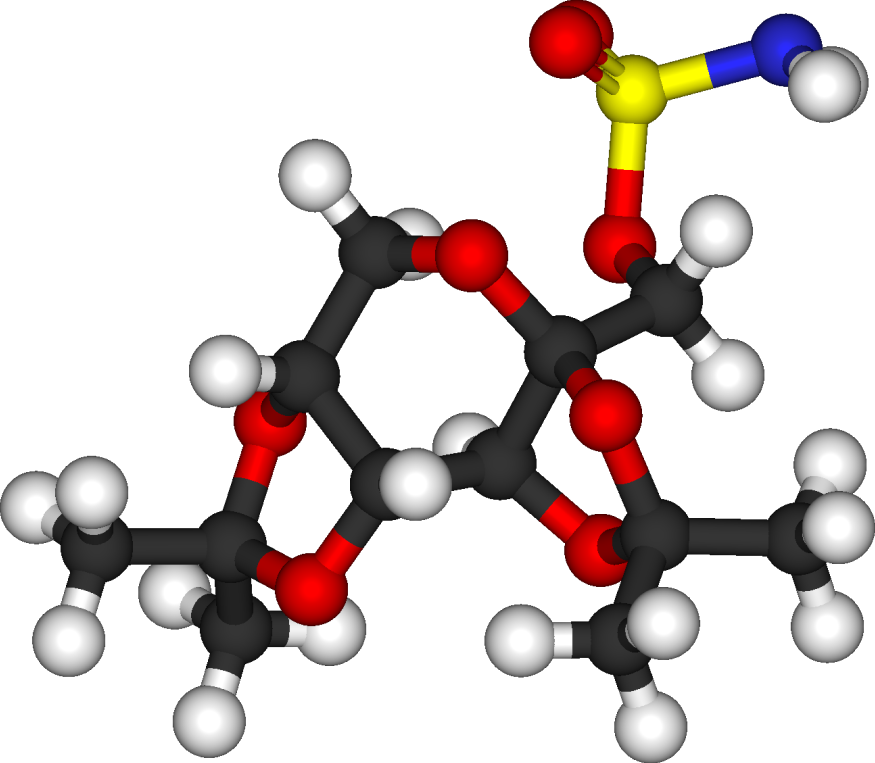

Clinical data
- Trade names: Topamax, Trokendi XR, Qudexy XR, others
- Other names: Topiramic acid
- AHFS/Drugs.com: Monograph
- MedlinePlus: a697012
- License data: US DailyMed: Topiramate
- Pregnancy category: AU: D
- Routes of administration: Oral
- ATC code: N03AX11 (WHO) A08AA51 (WHO)

Legal status
- Legal status: AU: S4 (Prescription only); BR: Class C1 (Other controlled substances); CA: ℞-only; UK: POM (Prescription only); US: ℞-only; EU: Rx-only

Pharmacokinetic data
- Bioavailability: 80%
- Protein binding: 13–17%; 15–41%
- Metabolism: Liver (20–30%)
- Elimination half-life: 21 hours
- Excretion: Urine (70–80%)

Identifiers
- IUPAC name: 2,3:4,5-Bis-O-(1-methylethylidene)-β-D-fructopyranose sulfamate
- CAS Number: 97240-79-4
- PubChem CID: 5284627
- IUPHAR/BPS: 6849
- DrugBank: DB00273
- ChemSpider: 4447672
- UNII: 0H73WJJ391
- KEGG: D00537
- ChEMBL: ChEMBL220492
- PDB ligand: TOR (PDBe, RCSB PDB)
- CompTox Dashboard (EPA): DTXSID8023688
- ECHA InfoCard: 100.129.713

Chemical and physical data
- Formula: C_{12}H_{21}NO_{8}S
- Molar mass: 339.36 g·mol^{−1}
- 3D model (JSmol): Interactive image
- SMILES: O=S(=O)(OC[C@@]21OC(O[C@H]1[C@@H]3OC(O[C@@H]3CO2)(C)C)(C)C)N
- InChI: InChI=1S/C12H21NO8S/c1-10(2)18-7-5-16-12(6-17-22(13,14)15)9(8(7)19-10)20-11(3,4)21-12/h7-9H,5-6H2,1-4H3,(H2,13,14,15)/t7-,8-,9+,12+/m1/s1; Key:KJADKKWYZYXHBB-XBWDGYHZSA-N

Topiramate, marketed as Topamax among other names, is an oral medication primarily prescribed for the treatment of epilepsy and the prophylaxis of migraines. For epilepsy, this includes treatment for generalized or focal seizures. It has also been used off-label for alcohol dependence and essential tremor.

Common side effects include tingling, feeling tired, loss of appetite, abdominal pain, weight loss, and cognitive dysfunction, such as trouble concentrating. Serious side effects may include suicidal ideation, increased ammonia levels resulting in encephalopathy, and kidney stones. Topiramate can cause birth defects, including cleft lip and palate. Risks and benefits should be carefully discussed with the full treatment team. Topiramate is considered "probably compatible" with lactation and is not contraindicated for breastfeeding, though monitoring of the infant for diarrhea or poor weight gain may be considered. Its mechanism of action is unclear.

Topiramate was first synthesized in a search for an oral hypoglycemic agent; however, it received its initial approval as an anticonvulsant in 1996. It is available as a generic medication. In 2023, it was the 71st most commonly prescribed medication in the United States, with more than 9 million prescriptions.

== Medical uses ==
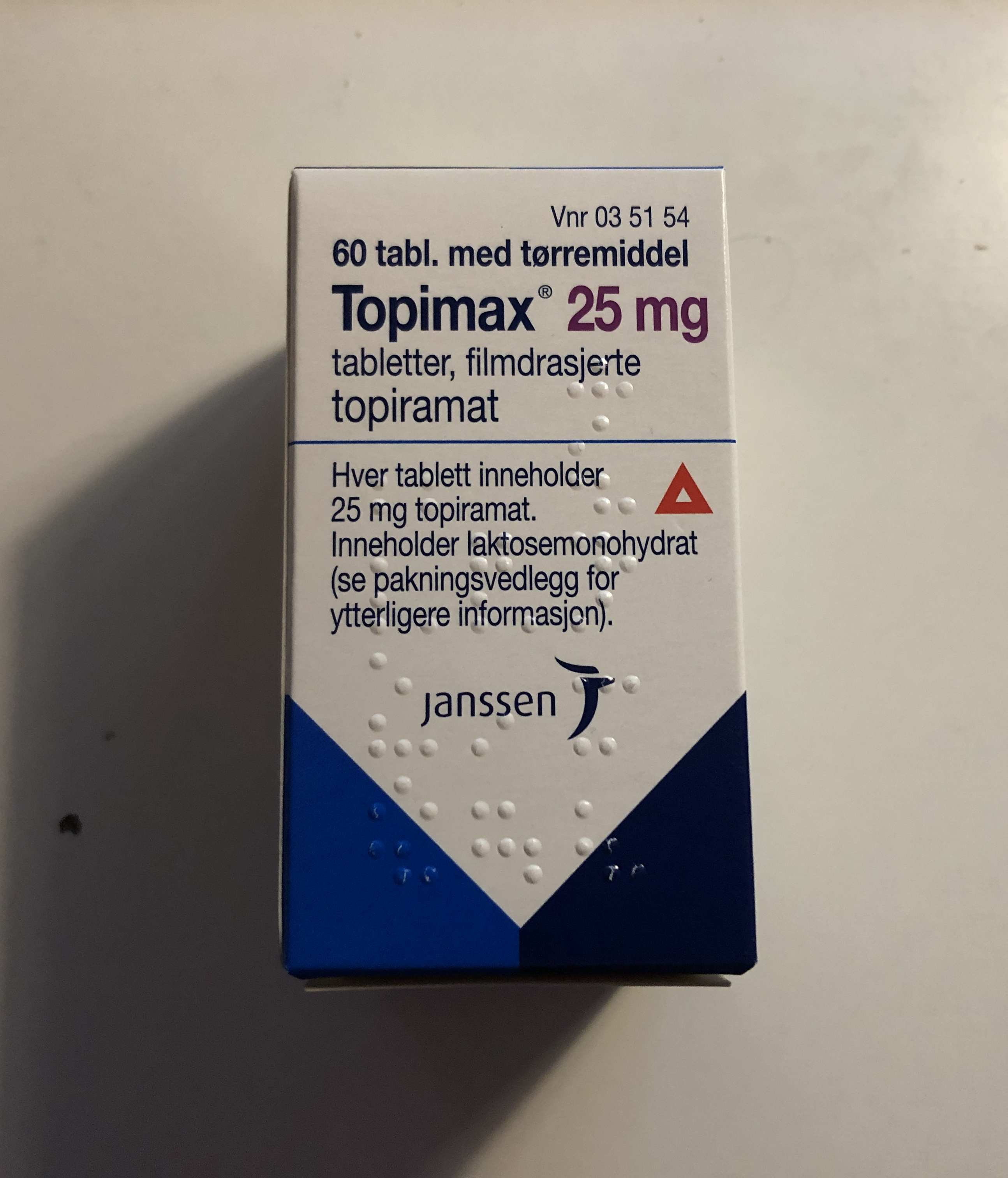
A package of topiramate 25mg from Norway

Topiramate is used to treat epilepsy in children and adults, and it was originally used as an anticonvulsant. In children, it is indicated for the treatment of Lennox-Gastaut syndrome, a disorder that causes seizures and developmental delay. It is most frequently prescribed for the prevention of migraines, as it decreases the frequency of attacks. Topiramate is used to treat medication overuse headache and is recommended by the European Federation of Neurological Societies as one of the few medications showing effectiveness for this indication.

=== Pain ===
A 2018 review found topiramate to be of no use in chronic low back pain. Topiramate has not been shown to work as a pain medicine in diabetic neuropathy, the only neuropathic condition for which it has been adequately tested.

=== Other ===
One common off-label use for topiramate is in the treatment of bipolar disorder. A review published in 2010 suggested a benefit of topiramate in the treatment of symptoms of borderline personality disorder; however, the authors noted that this was based on only one randomized controlled trial and requires replication.

Topiramate has been used as a treatment for alcoholism. The U.S. Veterans Affairs and Department of Defense 2015 guideline on substance use disorders lists topiramate as a "strong for" in its recommendations for alcohol use disorder.

Topiramate/phentermine combination therapy (trade name Qsymia) was approved by the USFDA in July 2012 for use by adults with obesity or overweight and a weight-related condition. Qsymia was approved by the USFDA in July 2022 for children and adolescents with age- and sex-standardized BMIs in or above the 95th percentile. Prior work had established single-agent topiramate therapy as weight loss-inducing in select populations (e.g., those with binge eating disorder or atypical antipsychotic-induced weight gain).

== Adverse effects ==
The most significant adverse effects associated with topiramate treatment are predominantly central nervous system (CNS) related. A notable proportion of patients, ranging from 11% to 28%, discontinue topiramate therapy due to adverse effects.

People taking topiramate should be aware of the following risks:

- Avoid activities requiring mental alertness and coordination until drug effects are understood. Psychomotor slowing is a frequently reported adverse effect, though it often diminishes with prolonged use or through careful adjustment of dosage.
- Topiramate may impair heat regulation, especially in children. Use caution with activities leading to an increased core temperature, such as strenuous exercise, exposure to extreme heat, or dehydration.
- Topiramate may cause visual field defects.
- Topiramate may decrease the effectiveness of oestrogen-containing oral contraceptives.
- Taking topiramate in the first trimester of pregnancy may increase the risk of cleft lip/cleft palate in infants.
- As is the case for all antiepileptic drugs, it is advisable not to suddenly discontinue topiramate, as there is a theoretical risk of rebound seizures.
- Some studies have attributed loss of appetite and upper respiratory tract infection to topiramate, but studies have concluded these adverse events are not difficult to tolerate for most individuals.

=== Frequency ===
Adverse effects by incidence:

Very common (>10% incidence) adverse effects include:

- Dizziness
- Weight loss
- Paraesthesia – e.g., pins and needles
- Somnolence
- Nausea
- Diarrhea
- Fatigue
- Nasopharyngitis
- Depression

Rarely, the inhibition of carbonic anhydrase may be strong enough to cause metabolic acidosis of clinical importance.

The U.S. Food and Drug Administration (FDA) has notified prescribers that topiramate can cause acute myopia and secondary angle closure glaucoma in a small subset of people who take a lot of topiramate. The symptoms, which typically begin in the first month of use, include blurred vision and eye pain. Discontinuation of topiramate may halt the progression of the ocular damage and may reverse the visual impairment.

Preliminary data suggests that, as with several other anti-epileptic drugs, topiramate carries an increased risk of congenital malformations. This might be particularly important for women who take topiramate to prevent migraine attacks. In March 2011, the FDA notified healthcare professionals and patients of an increased risk of development of cleft lip and/or cleft palate (oral clefts) in infants born to women treated with Topamax (topiramate) during pregnancy and placed it in Pregnancy Category D.

Cognitive and word-finding difficulties, which may occur in some patients, may respond to piracetam.

Carbonation dysgeusia (distortion of the sense of taste-sensation of carbonation) may respond to and/or be prevented with zinc.

Topiramate has been associated with a statistically significant increase in suicidality, and "suicidal thoughts or actions" is now listed as one of the possible side effects of the drug "in a very small number of people, about 1 in 500."

== Overdose ==
Symptoms of acute and acute on chronic exposure to topiramate range from asymptomatic to status epilepticus, including in patients with no seizure history. In children, overdose may also result in hallucinations. Topiramate has been deemed the primary substance that led to fatal overdoses in cases that were complicated by polydrug exposure. The most common signs of overdose are dilated pupils, somnolence, dizziness, psychomotor agitation, and abnormal, uncoordinated body movements.

== Interactions ==
Topiramate has many drug-drug interactions. Some of the most common are listed below:

- As topiramate inhibits carbonic anhydrase, use with other inhibitors of carbonic anhydrase (e.g., acetazolamide) increases the risk of kidney stones.
- Enzyme inducers (e.g., carbamazepine) can increase the elimination of topiramate, possibly necessitating dose escalations of topiramate.
- Topiramate may increase the plasma levels of phenytoin.
- Topiramate itself is a weak inhibitor of CYP2C19 and induces CYP3A4; a decrease in plasma levels of estrogens and digoxin has been noted during topiramate therapy. This can reduce the effectiveness of oral contraceptives (i.e., birth control pills); use of alternative birth control methods is recommended. Neither intrauterine devices (IUDs) nor Depo-Provera are affected by topiramate.
- Alcohol may cause increased sedation or drowsiness and increase the risk of having a seizure.
- As topiramate may result in acidosis, other treatments that also do so may worsen this effect.
- Oligohidrosis and hyperthermia were reported in post-marketing reports about topiramate; antimuscarinic drugs (like trospium) can aggravate these disorders.

== Pharmacology ==
Chair-style representation of skeletal formula

The topiramate molecule is a sulfamate modified sugar—more specifically, fructose diacetonide, an unusual chemical structure for a pharmaceutical.

Topiramate is quickly absorbed after oral use. It has a half-life of 21 hours, and steady-state drug levels are reached in 4 days in patients with normal renal function. Most of the drug (70%) is excreted in the urine unchanged. The remainder is extensively metabolized by hydroxylation, hydrolysis, and glucuronidation. Six metabolites have been identified in humans, none of which constitutes more than 5% of an administered dose.

Several cellular targets have been proposed as relevant to topiramate's therapeutic activity. These include voltage-gated sodium channels, high-voltage-activated calcium channels, GABA_{A} receptors, AMPA/kainate receptors, and carbonic anhydrase isoenzymes. There is evidence that topiramate may alter the activity of its targets by altering their phosphorylation state rather than by direct action. The effect on sodium channels could be of particular relevance for seizure protection. Although topiramate does inhibit high-voltage-activated calcium channels, its relevance to clinical activity is uncertain. Effects on specific GABA_{A} receptor isoforms could also contribute to the anticonvulsant activity of the drug. Topiramate selectively inhibits cytosolic (type II) and membrane-associated (type IV) forms of carbonic anhydrase. Its action on carbonic anhydrase isoenzymes may contribute to the drug's side effects, including its propensity to cause metabolic acidosis and calcium phosphate kidney stones.

Topiramate inhibits maximal seizure activity in electroconvulsive therapy and in pentylenetetrazol-induced seizures as well as partial and secondarily generalized tonic-clonic seizures in the kindling model, findings predictive of a broad spectrum of activities clinically. Its action on mitochondrial permeability transition pores has been proposed as a mechanism.

While many anticonvulsants have been associated with apoptosis in young animals, animal experiments have found that topiramate is one of the very few anticonvulsants that do not induce apoptosis in young animals at doses needed to produce an anticonvulsant effect.

=== Detection in body fluids ===
Blood, serum, or plasma topiramate concentrations may be measured using immunoassay or chromatographic methods to monitor therapy, confirm a diagnosis of poisoning in hospitalized patients, or assist in a medicolegal death investigation. Plasma levels are usually less than 10 mg/L during therapeutic administration, but can range from 10 to 150 mg/L in overdose victims.

== History ==
Topiramate was discovered in 1979 by Bruce E. Maryanoff and Joseph F. Gardocki during their research work at McNeil Pharmaceuticals. Topiramate was first sold in 1996. Mylan Pharmaceuticals was granted final approval by the FDA for the sale of generic topiramate in the United States and the generic version was made available in September 2006. The last patent for topiramate in the U.S. was for use in children and expired on 28 February 2009.

== Research ==
Topiramate is being studied as a potential treatment for post-traumatic stress disorder (PTSD).

There is some evidence for the use of topiramate in the management of cravings related to withdrawal from dextromethorphan.

A 2023 systematic review of seizure treatment for infants aged 1 to 36 months identified three studies that evaluated the use of topiramate. Though its adverse effects, including upper respiratory tract infection and loss of appetite, were rarely severe enough for the medication to be discontinued in this age group, its effectiveness in reducing seizures was inconclusive. The available research suffers from small sample sizes, inconsistent findings, and inadequate comparison groups.
