= Cloforex =

Chemical compound

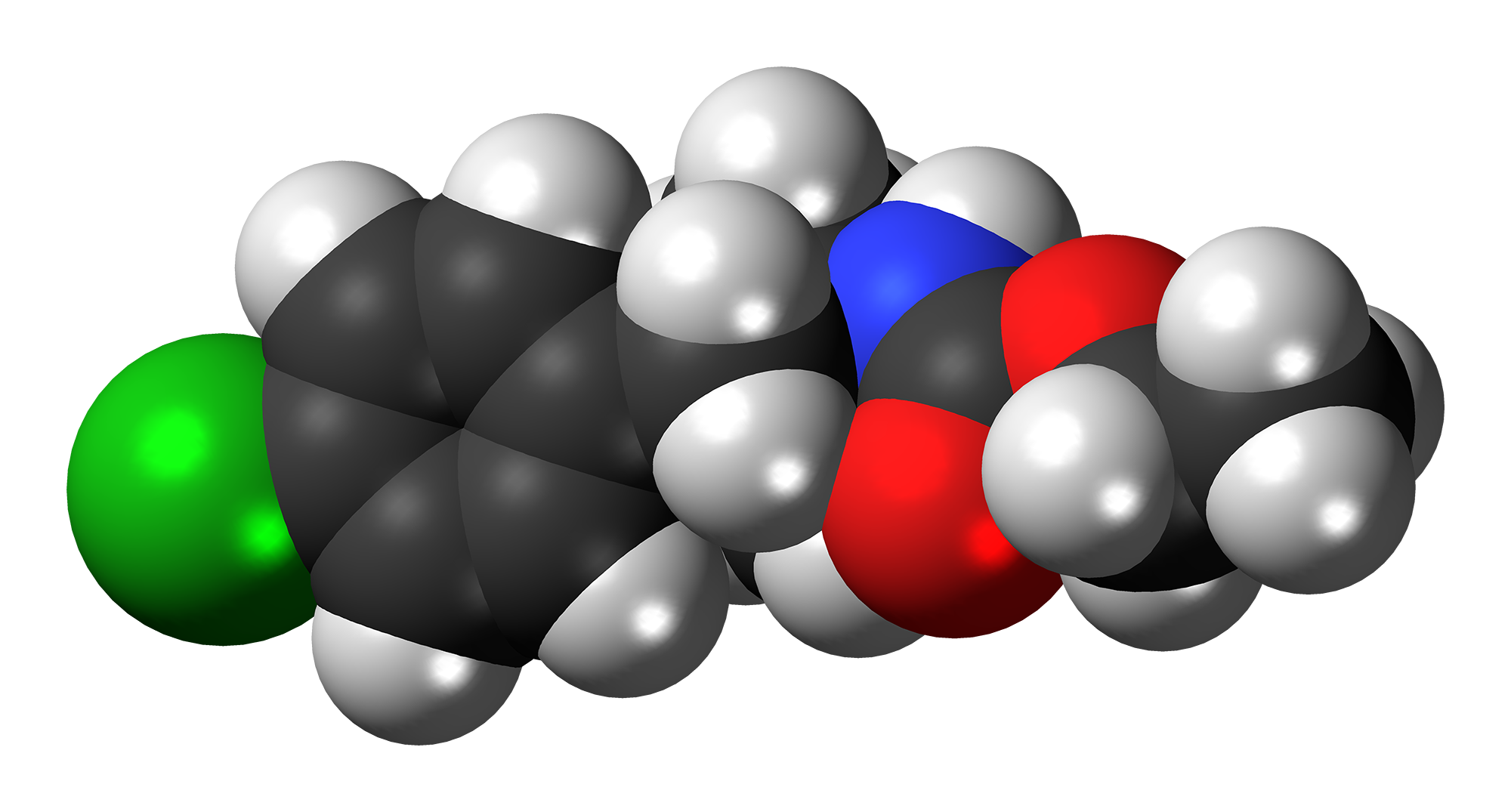

Clinical data
- Trade names: Frenapyl, Lipociden, Oberex, Vidipon, Zeisin
- Other names: Carbamic acid, N-[2-(4-chlorophenyl)-1,1-dimethylethyl]-, ethyl ester
- Routes of administration: Oral
- ATC code: none

Legal status
- Legal status: In general: ℞ (Prescription only)

Identifiers
- IUPAC name: ethyl N-[1-(4-chlorophenyl)-2-methylpropan-2-yl]carbamate
- CAS Number: 14261-75-7
- PubChem CID: 26602
- ChemSpider: 24781
- UNII: 2QJT5ZC1L6
- ChEMBL: ChEMBL1697686
- CompTox Dashboard (EPA): DTXSID7048794
- ECHA InfoCard: 100.034.659

Chemical and physical data
- Formula: C_{13}H_{18}ClNO_{2}
- Molar mass: 255.74 g·mol^{−1}
- 3D model (JSmol): Interactive image
- Melting point: 89 °C (192 °F)
- Boiling point: 52.75 °C (126.95 °F)
- SMILES: CCOC(=O)NC(C)(C)CC1=CC=C(C=C1)Cl

Cloforex (Oberex, also Chlorofex) is an anorectic of the amphetamine class. It is a prodrug to chlorphentermine. Oberex (50 mg cloforex) was tested in clinical trials as an appetite suppressant where a weight reducing effect was observed in comparison to placebo treatment. Cloforex was commercially available in Germany, Switzerland, and Venezuela in the 1960s as an anti-obesity drug, and was withdrawn because of the cardiotoxicity, specifically primary pulmonary hypertension.

Rats that consumed 75 mg of cloforex a day experienced weight loss along with pulmonary hypertension and hair loss. Cloforex at 60 mg/kg produces a model of pulmonary lipidosis in rats, inducing production of blood monocytes and foam cells.

== See also ==
- Alaproclate
