= C11H15NO2 =

The molecular formula C_{11}H_{15}NO_{2} (molar mass : 193.24 g/mol, exact mass : 193.110279) may refer to:

- 1,3-Benzodioxolylbutanamine
- N-(Ethoxycarbonyl)phenethylamine
- Butamben
- CHF-1024
- m-Cumenyl methylcarbamate
- 3,4-Ethylenedioxyamphetamine
- 3,4-Ethylidenedioxyamphetamine
- Heliamine
- Homo-MDA
- Isoprocarb
- Lemaireocereine
- Lobivine
- MDMA (3,4-MDMA, 3,4-Methylenedioxymethamphetamine)
- Methedrone
- 3-Methoxymethcathinone
- 1-Methylamino-1-(3,4-methylenedioxyphenyl)propane
- 2,3-Methylenedioxymethamphetamine (2,3-MDMA)
- 3,4-Methylenedioxyphentermine
- Methyl-MDA
  - 2-Methyl-MDA
  - 5-Methyl-MDA
  - 6-Methyl-MDA
- Tolibut
