= Tiflorex =

Never marketed appetite suppressant

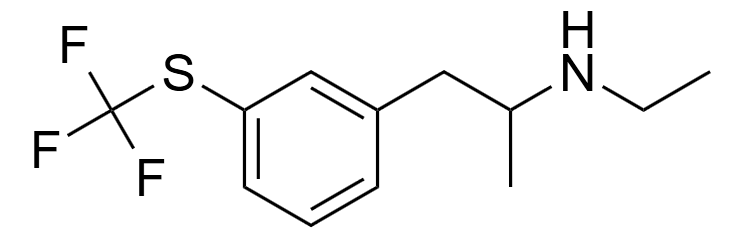

Clinical data
- ATC code: none

Identifiers
- IUPAC name: (RS)-N-ethyl-1-{3-[(trifluoromethyl)thio]phenyl}propan-2-amine
- CAS Number: 53993-67-2
- PubChem CID: 173669
- ChemSpider: 151574
- UNII: EG3B69DFQ5
- CompTox Dashboard (EPA): DTXSID90866374

Chemical and physical data
- Formula: C_{12}H_{16}F_{3}NS
- Molar mass: 263.32 g·mol^{−1}
- 3D model (JSmol): Interactive image
- Chirality: Racemic mixture
- SMILES: CCNC(C)Cc1cccc(c1)SC(F)(F)F
- InChI: InChI=1S/C12H16F3NS/c1-3-16-9(2)7-10-5-4-6-11(8-10)17-12(13,14)15/h4-6,8-9,16H,3,7H2,1-2H3; Key:HNONSDNCRNUTCT-UHFFFAOYSA-N

Tiflorex (TFX), formerly known as flutiorex, is a stimulant amphetamine that was under development as an appetite suppressant in the 1970s, but appears to have been abandoned. It is structurally related to fenfluramine and 4-MTA.

Tiflorex went to phase II clinical trials. The extended release formulation "TFX-SR" produced significant suppression of appetite. It also caused slightly more sleep disturbances and headaches than placebo, as well as mydriasis and a self-reported decrease in arousal. It had little effect on heart rate.

Tifluorex is claimed to be a more potent anorectic than fenfluramine, with twice its potency in humans and 4 times its potency in rats.

== Pharmacology ==
=== Pharmacodynamics ===
The mechanism of action of tiflorex has apparently never been studied. Similar compounds such as fenfluramine, norfenfluramine and 4-MTA act as selective serotonin releasing agents and 5-HT_{2} receptor agonists. Fenfluramine in particular causes very similar side effects and appetite suppression at therapeutically relevant doses.

=== Pharmacokinetics ===
In rats, tiflorex is rapidly N-dealkylated to norflutiorex. Both tiflorex and norflutiorex appear to be excreted in urine.

== Synthesis ==
Patent:

The Rosenmund reduction of 3-(trifluoromethylthio)benzoyl chloride [51748-28-8] (1) gave 3-((trifluoromethyl)thio)benzaldehyde [51748-27-7] (2). Henry reaction with nitroethane led to 1-(2-nitroprop-1-en-1-yl)-3-[(trifluoromethyl)sulfanyl]benzene [176242-84-5] (3). With the aid of iron catalyst in concentrated HCl acid there occurred FGI into 1-(3'-trifluoromethylthiophenyl)-2-propanone, CID:21325269 (4'). Reductive amination with ethylamine and formic acid as the reductant completed the synthesis of tiflorex (5).
