= C12H16F3N =

The molecular formula C_{12}H_{16}F_{3}N (molar mass: 231.25 g/mol, exact mass: 231.1235 u) may refer to:

- Dexfenfluramine, an anoretic drug
- Fenfluramine
- Levofenfluramine
