= Flumexadol =

Chemical compound

Clinical data
- Drug class: Serotonin 5-HT_{1A} receptor agonist; Serotonin 5-HT_{2C} receptor agonist; Serotonin 5-HT_{2A} receptor agonist
- ATC code: None

Identifiers
- IUPAC name: 2-(3-(Trifluoromethyl)phenyl)morpholine
- CAS Number: 30914-89-7
- PubChem CID: 65774
- ChemSpider: 59194
- UNII: V9783UEL0F
- CompTox Dashboard (EPA): DTXSID00865570

Chemical and physical data
- Formula: C_{11}H_{12}F_{3}NO
- Molar mass: 231.218 g·mol^{−1}
- 3D model (JSmol): Interactive image
- SMILES: C1COC(CN1)C2=CC(=CC=C2)C(F)(F)F
- InChI: InChI=1S/C11H12F3NO/c12-11(13,14)9-3-1-2-8(6-9)10-7-15-4-5-16-10/h1-3,6,10,15H,4-5,7H2; Key:GXPYCYWPUGKQIJ-UHFFFAOYSA-N

Flumexadol (INN; developmental codes CERM-1841 and 1841-CERM) is a serotonin receptor modulator which was described and researched as a non-opioid analgesic but was never marketed. It might be employable as an anorectic in addition to analgesic. Though flumexadol itself has never been approved for medical use, oxaflozane (brand name Conflictan) is a prodrug of the compound that was formerly used clinically in France as an antidepressant and anxiolytic agent.

== Pharmacology ==
=== Pharmacodynamics ===
Flumexadol has been found to act as an agonist of the serotonin 5-HT_{1A} receptor (K_{i} = 79 nM), of the serotonin 5-HT_{2C} receptor (K_{i} = 32 nM), and, to a much lesser extent, of the serotonin 5-HT_{2A} receptor (K_{i} = 1,000 nM). According to Nilsson (2006) in a paper on serotonin 5-HT_{2C} receptor agonists as potential anorectics, "The (+)-enantiomer of this compound showed [...] affinity for the 5-HT_{2C} receptor (K_{i}) 25 nM) [...] and was 40-fold selective over the 5-HT_{2A} receptor in receptor binding studies. The racemic version [...], also known as 1841 CERM, was originally reported to possess analgesic properties while no association with 5-HT_{2C} receptor activity was mentioned."

== Chemistry ==
=== Synthesis ===
Thieme Synthesis: Patent:

Halogenation of 2-chloroethyl vinyl ether (1) with molecular bromine gives 1,2-dibromo-1-(2-chloroethoxy)ethane (2). Grignard reaction with 3-bromobenzotrifluoride (3) gives 1-[2-bromo-1-(2-chloroethoxy)ethyl]-3-(trifluoromethyl)benzene (4). Treatment with benzylamine gives 4-benzyl-2-[3-(trifluoromethyl) phenyl]morpholine (5). Catalytic hydrogenation strips the benzyl protecting group completing the synthesis of flumexadol (6).

== See also ==
- Oxaflozane
- Befiradol
- Fenfluramine
- Fludorex
- Fluminorex
- TFMPP
