= Flucetorex =

Chemical compound

Identifiers
- IUPAC name: 2-(4-acetamidophenoxy)-N-[1-[3-(trifluoromethyl)phenyl]propan-2-yl]acetamide
- CAS Number: 40256-99-3
- PubChem CID: 10000705
- ChemSpider: 8176286
- UNII: 0JJT8MQ49S
- ChEMBL: ChEMBL2105095

Chemical and physical data
- Formula: C_{20}H_{21}F_{3}N_{2}O_{3}
- Molar mass: 394.394 g·mol^{−1}
- 3D model (JSmol): Interactive image
- SMILES: CC(CC1=CC(=CC=C1)C(F)(F)F)NC(=O)COC2=CC=C(C=C2)NC(=O)C
- InChI: InChI=1S/C20H21F3N2O3/c1-13(10-15-4-3-5-16(11-15)20(21,22)23)24-19(27)12-28-18-8-6-17(7-9-18)25-14(2)26/h3-9,11,13H,10,12H2,1-2H3,(H,24,27)(H,25,26); Key:SKWBJBJQEUEFCY-UHFFFAOYSA-N

Flucetorex (INN) is an amphetamine. It was investigated as an anorectic, but does not appear to have been marketed. It is related to fenfluramine.

== See also ==
- Substituted amphetamine
- Benfluorex
- Fludorex
- Tiflorex
