= Methyl-MDA =

Methyl-MDA, also known as methylmethylenedioxyamphetamine, may refer to:

- N-Methyl-MDA (MDMA)
- 2-Methyl-MDA
- 5-Methyl-MDA
- 6-Methyl-MDA
