= Serotonin releasing agent =

Class of compounds

Chlorphentermine, a highly selective SRA that is no longer marketed.

A serotonin releasing agent (SRA) is a type of drug that induces the release of serotonin into the neuronal synaptic cleft. A selective serotonin releasing agent (SSRA) is an SRA with less significant or no efficacy in producing neurotransmitter efflux at other types of monoamine neurons, including dopamine and norepinephrine neurons.

SRAs, for instance fenfluramine, dexfenfluramine, and chlorphentermine, have been used clinically as appetite suppressants. However, these SRAs were withdrawn from the market due to toxicity in the 1990s and no SRAs were available or employable for clinical study for many years. In any case, a low-dose formulation was reintroduced for treatment of Dravet syndrome in 2020 and this allowed clinical and research use of SRAs in humans once again.

Aside from use as appetite suppressants, SSRAs have been proposed as novel antidepressants and anxiolytics, with the potential for a faster onset of action and superior effectiveness relative to the selective serotonin reuptake inhibitors (SSRIs).

A closely related type of drug is a serotonin reuptake inhibitor (SRI), for instance fluoxetine.

== Effects and comparisons ==
=== Selectivities and serotonin increases ===
A number of somewhat selective SRAs have been well-studied, for instance fenfluramine and meta-chlorophenylpiperazine (mCPP). Although fenfluramine and mCPP are efficacious SRAs, they are also highly potent agonists of serotonin 5-HT_{2} receptors, including of the serotonin 5-HT_{2A}, 5-HT_{2B}, and particularly 5-HT_{2C} receptors. Direct activation of serotonin receptors such as the serotonin 5-HT_{2C} receptor with fenfluramine has been shown to be therapeutically relevant in humans, as dexfenfluramine produces appetite suppressant effects even when its serotonin release is blocked by concomitant treatment with the selective serotonin reuptake inhibitor (SSRI) fluoxetine. Similarly, mCPP is an extremely potent agonist of the serotonin 5-HT_{2C} receptor and produces robust effects thought to be 5-HT_{2C} receptor-mediated in animals and humans, such as anxiety and panic. In addition to serotonin receptor agonism, fenfluramine is also a norepinephrine releasing agent with several-fold lower potency compared to serotonin release. As such, the serotonin 5-HT_{2} receptor agonism and other actions of these agents may modify their effects, and a fully selective SRA could produce very different effects.

The 2-aminoindane MMAI, and certain cathinones, have increased selectivity for serotonin release compared to fenfluramine and mCPP. Chlorphentermine is also notable in being a highly selective SRA, including having negligible activity as an agonist of all three of the serotonin 5-HT_{2} receptors. 4-Methylthioamphetamine (4-MTA) was originally described as a selective SRA, but was subsequently found to efficiently induce dopamine release as well, and is also known to act as a potent monoamine oxidase A (MAO-A) inhibitor. MMA has been found to act as a highly selective SRA, but has also been reported to produce psychedelic-like effects in both animals and humans.

SRAs achieve far greater increases in serotonin levels than SRIs and have substantially more robust of effects, both in animals and in terms of subjective effects in humans. Whereas the SSRI fluoxetine can increase serotonin levels in the hypothalamus in rats by up to 4-fold, the SRA dexfenfluramine can increase serotonin levels as much as 9- to 16-fold or more. Relatedly, genetic ablation of the serotonin transporter (SERT), which results in complete loss of SERT-mediated serotonin reuptake, is associated with 4- to 6-fold elevations in brain serotonin levels. SRIs produce subtle interoceptive cues that are difficult for animals to recognize in drug discrimination testing, whereas SRAs produce robust cues that are easily recognized and learned.

=== Stimulant-like and rewarding effects ===
Certain SRAs, such as fenfluramine and chlorphentermine, do not produce locomotor activation (a stimulant-like effect) in animals. Moreover, fenfluramine robustly inhibits the locomotor hyperactivity and rewarding effects induced by psychostimulants like amphetamine and phentermine. Whereas amphetamine and phentermine produce strong locomotor stimulation in rodents, combination of fenfluramine and phentermine results in only weak locomotor activation and substantial reduction in conditioned place preference (CPP). Fenfluramine also suppresses the subjective effects and positive mood effects of amphetamine and phentermine in humans.

In spite of the preceding however, it has also been reported that the SRA dexfenfluramine weakly but dose-dependently stimulates locomotor activity in rodents. Combination of dexfenfluramine with the selective serotonin 5-HT_{2C} receptor antagonist SB-242084 results in dexfenfluramine dramatically and dose-dependently enhancing locomotion. However, it has also been reported that serotonin 5-HT_{2B} and 5-HT_{2C} receptor antagonism with SB-206553 does not allow fenfluramine to produce robust hyperactivity, although further addition of amphetamine does produce marked hyperlocomotion (greater than with amphetamine alone). The reasons for these conflicting findings are unclear. In any case, in other research, serotonin 5-HT_{2B} receptor knockout or selective serotonin 5-HT_{2B} receptor antagonism with RS-127445 has been found to abolish MDMA-induced serotonin release and locomotor hyperactivity. As with reported findings with fenfluramine, whereas the SRA and serotonin 5-HT_{2C} receptor agonist mCPP decreases locomotor activity normally, it increases locomotor activity in serotonin 5-HT_{2C} receptor knockout mice or with serotonin 5-HT_{2C} receptor antagonism. This increased locomotor activity could be blocked by a serotonin 5-HT_{1B} receptor antagonist. However, other research suggests that the serotonin 5-HT_{2A} receptor is also involved in mCPP-induced hyperlocomotion in the context of serotonin 5-HT_{2C} receptor inactivation.

In contrast to fenfluramine and mCPP, the SSRI fluoxetine has no impact on locomotor activity alone or in combination with SB-242084. In addition to its modulation of locomotion, the suppressive effects of fenfluramine on drug self-administration are blocked by SB-242084.

Whereas certain SRAs like fenfluramine and chlorphentermine do not increase locomotor activity, other SRAs, including MDMA, MDEA, MBDB, para-chloroamphetamine (PCA), (S)-MDA, α-methyltryptamine (αMT), and α-ethyltryptamine (αET), are able to dose-dependently increase locomotor activity. Moreover, this effect appears to be serotonin-dependent, as it can be blocked by pretreatment with SSRIs like fluoxetine (which prevent the serotonin-releasing effects of SRAs). Similarly, the non-selective serotonin receptor antagonist methysergide as well as the serotonin synthesis inhibitor para-chlorophenylalanine (PCPA) block the hyperlocomotion of αMT. Contrasting with the preceding findings, the suppression of locomotor activity by fenfluramine and its metabolite dexnorfenfluramine is not blocked by fluoxetine, indicating that it is not due to induction of serotonin release. Similarly, MMAI dose-dependently suppresses locomotor activity, and this is likewise not blocked by fluoxetine nor by the non-selective serotonin receptor antagonist metitepine. However, it was, contrarily, antagonized by the serotonin synthesis inhibitor PCPA. MDAI suppresses locomotor activity initially, but there is rebound locomotor stimulation at a high dose, and this was described as similar to the profile of MDMA. The increased locomotion induced by SRAs that cause this effect appears to be critically dependent on serotonin 5-HT_{1B} receptor signaling. Conversely, 5-HT_{2C} receptor antagonists markedly enhance the hyperlocomotion of MDMA.

In terms of reinforcing properties, MDMA produces dose-dependent CPP, MDAI produces CPP, MBDB produces weak CPP, fenfluramine produces conditioned place aversion (CPA), and MMAI has no effect on place conditioning at lower doses but produces CPA similarly to fenfluramine at high doses. mCPP had no effect on place conditioning, at least in one study. SSRIs have shown highly mixed effects on place conditioning, with fluoxetine producing CPP, zimelidine producing CPP or having no effect, and citalopram producing CPA. Though zimelidine was reported to produce CPP in one study, it could also block the CPP induced by amphetamine.

Effects on intracranial self-stimulation (ICSS) can be used to measure the reinforcing and misuse-related effects of drugs. ICSS is enhanced by amphetamine and is reduced by the serotonin 5-HT_{2C} receptor agonist Ro 60-0175, by the SRA and serotonin 5-HT_{2C} receptor agonist fenfluramine, and by the κ-opioid receptor agonist U-69,593 in rats. The serotonin–norepinephrine–dopamine releasing agents (SNDRAs) and serotonin receptor agonists (+)-MDMA and naphthylaminopropane (NAP; PAL-287) showed mixed effects on ICSS, either augmenting or suppressing ICSS depending on the ICSS frequencies. The serotonin 5-HT_{2C} receptor antagonist SB-242084 completely blocked the suppressive effects of Ro 60-0175 and fenfluramine on ICSS, whereas it did not influence the effects of amphetamine or U-69,593 on ICSS. SB-242084 partially reduced the ICSS suppressive effects of (+)-MDMA and NAP and augmented their facilitatory effects on ICSS. Conversely, the non-selective serotonin receptor antagonist methysergide completely blocked the ICSS depression produced by MDMA. These findings suggest that serotonin 5-HT_{2C} receptor activation plays a major role in the anti-reinforcing effects of SRAs, but that other serotonin receptors may also be involved.

=== Psychedelic-like effects ===
Fenfluramine dose-dependently induces the head-twitch response, a behavioral proxy of psychedelic-like effects, and this is assumed to be due to activation of serotonin 5-HT_{2A} receptors. Conversely, fluoxetine does not produce head twitches at any dose. In accordance with animal findings, very high doses of fenfluramine have been reported to produce LSD-like psychedelic effects in humans. The psychedelic effects of fenfluramine may be mediated by direct serotonin 5-HT_{2A} receptor agonism, as other SRAs like MDMA, PCA, and chlorphentermine have been reported not to produce the head-twitch response in animals and PCA has not been reported to produce hallucinogenic effects in humans. In contrast to fenfluramine, PCA is notably not a serotonin 5-HT_{2A} receptor agonist or may only act as one at high doses, chlorphentermine shows very weak or negligible activity at the serotonin 5-HT_{2} receptors, and MDMA is a relatively low-potency and low-efficacy partial agonist of the serotonin 5-HT_{2A} receptor. In conflict with the preceding findings however, PCA has been reported to robustly induce the head-twitch response in animals in other studies, and this appeared to be dependent on induction of serotonin release as opposed to direct serotonin 5-HT_{2A} receptor agonism, since it could be largely blocked by an SRI or by serotonin synthesis inhibitor. In any case, SRAs are described as not inherently hallucinogenic in humans, and hence the induction of the head-twitch response with them has been considered a false-positive for psychedelic effects.

=== Antidepressant-like effects ===
SSRIs like fluoxetine, as well as non-selective SRIs, are used and claimed to be clinically effective in the treatment of depression. SRAs produce far more robust of increases in serotonin levels than SRIs. On the basis of these findings, it has been proposed that SSRAs may be more effective antidepressants than SSRIs and may have a faster onset of action. Accordingly, SSRAs like MMAI and 4-MTA, as well as non-selective SRAs like fenfluramine, show antidepressant-like effects in animal tests, for instance in the chronic mild stress (CMS) test and the forced swim test (FST), and show greater magnitudes of effects than SSRIs like sertraline.

In addition to its antidepressant-like effects, MMAI has shown anxiolytic-like effects in animals. Relatedly, SRAs have been suggested for potential treatment of anxiety disorder, panic disorder, obsessive–compulsive disorder (OCD), and other conditions as well.

Although SRAs might be more effective than SRIs for uses like depression treatment, SRAs may also have greater risks than SRIs, for instance higher risk of serotonin syndrome. Tachyphylaxis to their beneficial therapeutic effects might also occur.

A few SRAs have in fact already been clinically studied and/or marketed as antidepressants in the past. These include αET, which was previously marketed in the United States under the brand name Monase; α-methyltryptamine (αMT), which was previously marketed in the Soviet Union under the brand name Indopan; fenfluramine, which has been clinically studied for depression but was never approved for this use; and PCA, which has been clinically studied for depression but was discontinued due to animal findings of serotonergic neurotoxicity.

== Examples and use of SRAs ==
Fenfluramine, chlorphentermine, and aminorex, which are also amphetamines and relatives, were formerly used as appetite suppressants but were discontinued due to concerns of cardiac valvulopathy. This side effect has been attributed to their serotonin release and/or the additional action of potent agonism of the 5-HT_{2B} receptor in the case of fenfluramine. Indeloxazine is said to be an SRA and norepinephrine reuptake inhibitor (NRI) that was formerly used as an antidepressant, nootropic, and neuroprotective.

Amphetamines like MDMA, MDEA, MDA, and MBDB, among other relatives (see MDxx), are recreational drugs termed entactogens. They act as serotonin–norepinephrine–dopamine releasing agents (SNDRAs) and also agonize serotonin receptors, such as those in the 5-HT_{2} subfamily.

Some tryptamines, such as DMT, bufotenin, and psilocin, are SRAs as well as non-selective serotonin receptor agonists. Psilocin is a partial releaser of serotonin, with an E_{max} of 54%. These drugs are serotonergic psychedelics, which is a consequence of their ability to activate the 5-HT_{2A} receptor. Other tryptamines, including tryptamine itself, αET, and αMT, are SNDRAs and non-selective serotonin receptor agonists. αET and αMT were originally thought to act as monoamine oxidase inhibitors (MAOIs) and were formerly used as antidepressants, but are now encountered solely as recreational drugs. αET and αMT are described as being entactogen-like.

== List of SRAs ==
=== Pharmaceutical drugs and related ===
==== Amphetamines ====
- Amiflamine (FLA-336) (also an MAOI)
- Chlorphentermine (Apsedon, Desopimon, Lucofen)
- Cloforex (Oberex) (prodrug of chlorphentermine)
- Dexfenfluramine (Redux) (enantiomer of fenfluramine)
- Etolorex (prodrug of chlorphentermine; never marketed)
- Fenfluramine (Pondimin, Fen-Phen)
- Flucetorex (related to chlorphentermine; never marketed)
- Levofenfluramine (enantiomer of fenfluramine)
- Norfenfluramine (metabolite of fenfluramine)

==== Tryptamines ====
- α-Ethyltryptamine (αET, AET; etryptamine; Monase; withdrawn)
- α-Methyltryptamine (αMT, AMT; Indopan; withdrawn)

==== Others ====
- Carbamazepine (Equetro, Epitol, and many other variations)
- Indeloxazine (Elen, Noin) (non-selective; discontinued)
- Viqualine (PK-5078) (also a GABA_{A} receptor PAM; never marketed)

=== Recreational drugs and research chemicals ===
==== Amphetamines ====
- 3-Methoxy-4-methylamphetamine (MMA)
- 4-Methoxyamphetamine (PMA)
- 4-Methoxy-N-ethylamphetamine (PMEA)
- 4-Methoxy-N-methylamphetamine (PMMA)
- 4-Methylthioamphetamine (4-MTA)

===== Ring-extended amphetamines =====
- 2-Methyl-3,4-methylenedioxyamphetamine (2-Methyl-MDA)
- 3-Methyl-4,5-methylenedioxyamphetamine (5-Methyl-MDA)
- 3,4-Ethylenedioxy-N-methylamphetamine (EDMA)
- 3,4-Methylenedioxyamphetamine (MDA)
- 3,4-Methylenedioxyethylamphetamine (MDEA)
- 3,4-Methylenedioxymethamphetamine (MDMA)
- 5-(2-Aminopropyl)benzofuran (5-APB)
- 5-(2-Aminopropyl)-2,3-dihydrobenzofuran (5-APDB)
- 5-Indanyl-2-aminopropane (IAP)
- 5-MABB
- 5-MAPB
- 6-(2-Aminopropyl)benzofuran (6-APB)
- 6-MABB
- 6-MAPB
- 6-Tetralinyl-2-aminopropane (TAP)
- N-Methyl-1,3-benzodioxolylbutanamine (MBDB)
- Methamnetamine (MNAP; PAL-1046)
- Naphthylaminopropane (NAP; PAL-287)
- ODMA
- SeDMA
- TDMA

===== Cathinones =====
- 4-Chloroethcathinone (4-CEC)
- Butylone (βk-MBDB)
- Mephedrone (4-methylmethcathinone; 4-MMC)
- Methylone (3,4-methylenedioxymethcathinone; MDMC)

==== Phenyloxazolamines ====
- Aminorex
- 3',4'-Methylenedioxy-4-methylaminorex (MDMAR)

==== 2-Aminoindanes ====
- 5-Methoxy-2-aminoindane (MEAI, 5-MeO-AI)
- 5-Methoxy-6-methylaminoindane (MMAI)
- 5,6-Methylenedioxy-N-methyl-2-aminoindane (MDMAI)
- 5,6-Methylenedioxy-2-aminoindane (MDAI)
- 5-Trifluoromethyl-2-aminoindane (TAI)
- N-Ethyl-5-trifluoromethyl-2-aminoindane (ETAI)

==== 1-Aminomethylindanes ====
- 1-Aminomethyl-5-methoxyindane (AMMI)

==== 2-Aminotetralins ====
- 6-Chloro-2-aminotetralin (6-CAT)
- 6,7-Methylenedioxy-2-aminotetralin (MDAT)
- 6,7-Methylenedioxy-N-methyl-2-aminotetralin (MDMAT)

==== Phenylpiperazines ====
- meta-Chlorophenylpiperazine (mCPP)
- 3-Trifluoromethylphenylpiperazine (TFMPP)

==== Tryptamines ====
- 5-Chloro-αET
- 5-Chloro-αMT
- 5-Fluoro-αET
- 5-Fluoro-αMT
- βk-NM-αMT
- Dimethyltryptamine (DMT)
- Methylethyltryptamine (MET)
- Psilocin
- Bufotenin
- Tryptamine

==== Isotryptamines ====
- α-Methylisotryptamine (isoAMT)

==== Others/unsorted ====
- PAL-335
- UCD0168

== See also ==
- Monoamine releasing agent
