= C12H19NS =

The molecular formula C_{12}H_{19}NS (molar mass: 209.35 g/mol) may refer to:

- N,N-Dimethyl-4-methylthioamphetamine
- 4-Methylthioethylamphetamine
