= Oxaflozane =

Chemical compound

Clinical data
- Trade names: Conflictan
- Other names: CERM-1766
- Routes of administration: Oral
- ATC code: N06AX10 (WHO)

Legal status
- Legal status: In general: ℞ (Prescription only)

Identifiers
- IUPAC name: 4-Propan-2-yl-2-[3-(trifluoromethyl)phenyl]morpholine
- CAS Number: 26629-87-8; HCl: 26629-86-7
- PubChem CID: 432824
- ChemSpider: 382782
- UNII: V4WLW77V5Q; HCl: E10FW59D1I
- KEGG: D07340
- CompTox Dashboard (EPA): DTXSID50865308
- ECHA InfoCard: 100.043.490

Chemical and physical data
- Formula: C_{14}H_{18}F_{3}NO
- Molar mass: 273.299 g·mol^{−1}
- 3D model (JSmol): Interactive image
- SMILES: O1CCN(C(C)C)CC1c2cc(C(F)(F)F)ccc2

Oxaflozane (INN; brand name Conflictan) is an antidepressant and anxiolytic drug that was introduced by Solvay in France in 1982 for the treatment of depression but has since been discontinued. It is a prodrug of flumexadol (N-dealkyloxaflozane; 2-(3-trifluoromethylphenyl)morpholine; CERM-1841 or 1841-CERM), which is reported to act as an agonist of the serotonin 5-HT_{1A} (pK_{i} = 7.1) and 5-HT_{2C} (pK_{i} = 7.5) receptors and, to a much lesser extent, of the 5-HT_{2A} (pK_{i} = 6.0) receptor. In addition to its serotonergic properties, oxaflozane may also produce anticholinergic side effects at high doses, namely in overdose.

== See also ==
- Fluminorex
- Fludorex
- Fenfluramine
- TFMPP
- Befiradol
