= C13H17N5O5 =

The molecular formula C_{13}H_{17}N_{5}O_{5} (molar mass: 323.305 g/mol) may refer to:

- CMX521
- Pyroglutamyl-histidyl-glycine
