= C17H20N2 =

The molecular formula C_{17}H_{20}N_{2} may refer to:

- Desethylibogamine
- Diphenylmethylpiperazine
- UCD0168
