= 4-Methylthiomethamphetamine =

Clinical data
- Other names: 4-MTMA; N-Methyl-4-methylthioamphetamine; N-Methyl-MTA; NMMTA; PAL-1063; PAL1063
- Drug class: Serotonin releasing agent; Monoamine oxidase inhibitor; Entactogen
- ATC code: None

Identifiers
- IUPAC name: N-methyl-1-(4-methylsulfanylphenyl)propan-2-amine
- CAS Number: 547736-90-3
- PubChem CID: 46882957
- ChemSpider: 24678465
- ChEMBL: ChEMBL1078038

Chemical and physical data
- Formula: C_{11}H_{17}NS
- Molar mass: 195.32 g·mol^{−1}
- 3D model (JSmol): Interactive image
- SMILES: CC(CC1=CC=C(C=C1)SC)NC
- InChI: InChI=1S/C11H17NS/c1-9(12-2)8-10-4-6-11(13-3)7-5-10/h4-7,9,12H,8H2,1-3H3; Key:WWHIYWVWPXXBTC-UHFFFAOYSA-N

4-Methylthiomethamphetamine (4-MTMA; code name PAL-1063), also known as N-methyl-4-methylthioamphetamine (NMMTA), is a monoamine releasing agent (MRA) of the amphetamine family related to 4-methylthioamphetamine (4-MTA) and N,N-dimethyl-4-methylthioamphetamine (DMMTA or 4-MTDMA). Much less is known about 4-MTMA compared to 4-MTA.

4-MTMA is known to act as a potent serotonin releasing agent (SRA). Its EC_{50} value for induction of serotonin release in rat brain synaptosomes was 21 nM, whereas norepinephrine and dopamine release were not reported. In addition to its MRA activity, like 4-MTA, the drug has been found to act as a potent reversible enzyme inhibitor of monoamine oxidase A (MAO-A). It is about one-third as potent as 4-MTA as an MAO-A inhibitor. Its IC_{50} value for MAO-A inhibition is 0.89 nM, whereas the values of 4-MTA are 0.13 nM for (+)-4-MTA and 2.04 nM for (–)-4-MTA. Neither 4-MTA nor 4-MTMA inhibited monoamine oxidase B (MAO-B). Potent monoamine oxidase inhibition by amphetamines has been associated with dangerous and sometimes fatal toxicity in humans.

In animal drug discrimination tests, 4-MTA and 4-MTMA were found to generalize to MDMA. 4-MTA substituted for the serotonergic agent PMMA, whereas 4-MTMA did not. 4-MTA did not substitute for the serotonergic psychedelic DOM, whereas 4-MTMA was not assessed in DOM-trained animals. Neither 4-MTA nor 4-MTMA substituted for the psychostimulants dextroamphetamine or cocaine. It was concluded that 4-MTA and 4-MTMA show mainly MDMA-like effects in rodents.

4-MTMA had not been identified as an illicit drug or drug of misuse by 2004. However, it is said to have been encountered as a novel designer drug by 2015.

== See also ==
- Substituted amphetamine
