= 6-Methyl-MDA =

Psychoactive drug

Clinical data
- Routes of administration: Oral
- ATC code: None

Legal status
- Legal status: Uncontrolled (but may be covered under the Federal Analogue Act in the United States and under similar laws in other countries)

Identifiers
- IUPAC name: 1-(6-Methyl-1,3-benzodioxol-5-yl)propan-2-amine
- CAS Number: 246861-21-2
- PubChem CID: 10511982
- ChemSpider: 8687383
- UNII: ZXQ5PQR4TU
- ChEMBL: ChEMBL6376
- CompTox Dashboard (EPA): DTXSID501029470

Chemical and physical data
- Formula: C_{11}H_{15}NO_{2}
- Molar mass: 193.246 g·mol^{−1}
- 3D model (JSmol): Interactive image
- SMILES: O1c2cc(c(cc2OC1)CC(N)C)C
- InChI: InChI=1S/C11H15NO2/c1-7-3-10-11(14-6-13-10)5-9(7)4-8(2)12/h3,5,8H,4,6,12H2,1-2H3; Key:HCFHWXDIZOAUTQ-UHFFFAOYSA-N

6-Methyl-MDA, also known as 6-methyl-3,4-methylenedioxyamphetamine is an entactogen and psychedelic drug of the amphetamine and MDxx families. It was first synthesized in the late 1990s by a team including David E. Nichols at Purdue University while investigating derivatives of 3,4-methylenedioxyamphetamine (MDA) and 3,4-methylenedioxy-N-methylamphetamine (MDMA).

6-Methyl-MDA has IC_{50} values of 783 nM, 28,300 nM, and 4,602 nM for inhibiting the reuptake of serotonin, dopamine, and norepinephrine in rat synaptosomes. In animal studies it substitutes for MBDB, MMAI, LSD, and 2,5-dimethoxy-4-iodoamphetamine (DOI), though not amphetamine, but only partially and at high doses. Thus, while several-fold less potent than its analogues 2-methyl-MDA and 5-methyl-MDA, and approximately half as potent as MDA, 6-methyl-MDA is still significantly active.

According to Daniel Trachsel and colleagues, 6-methyl-MDA is active at a dose of 160 mg orally and has a duration of 8 hours.

6-Methyl-MDA is a controlled substance in Canada under phenethylamine blanket-ban language.

== See also ==
- Substituted methylenedioxyphenethylamine
- 2,6-di-tert-butylphenol
