= Levofenfluramine =

Non-marketed drug of the amphetamine class

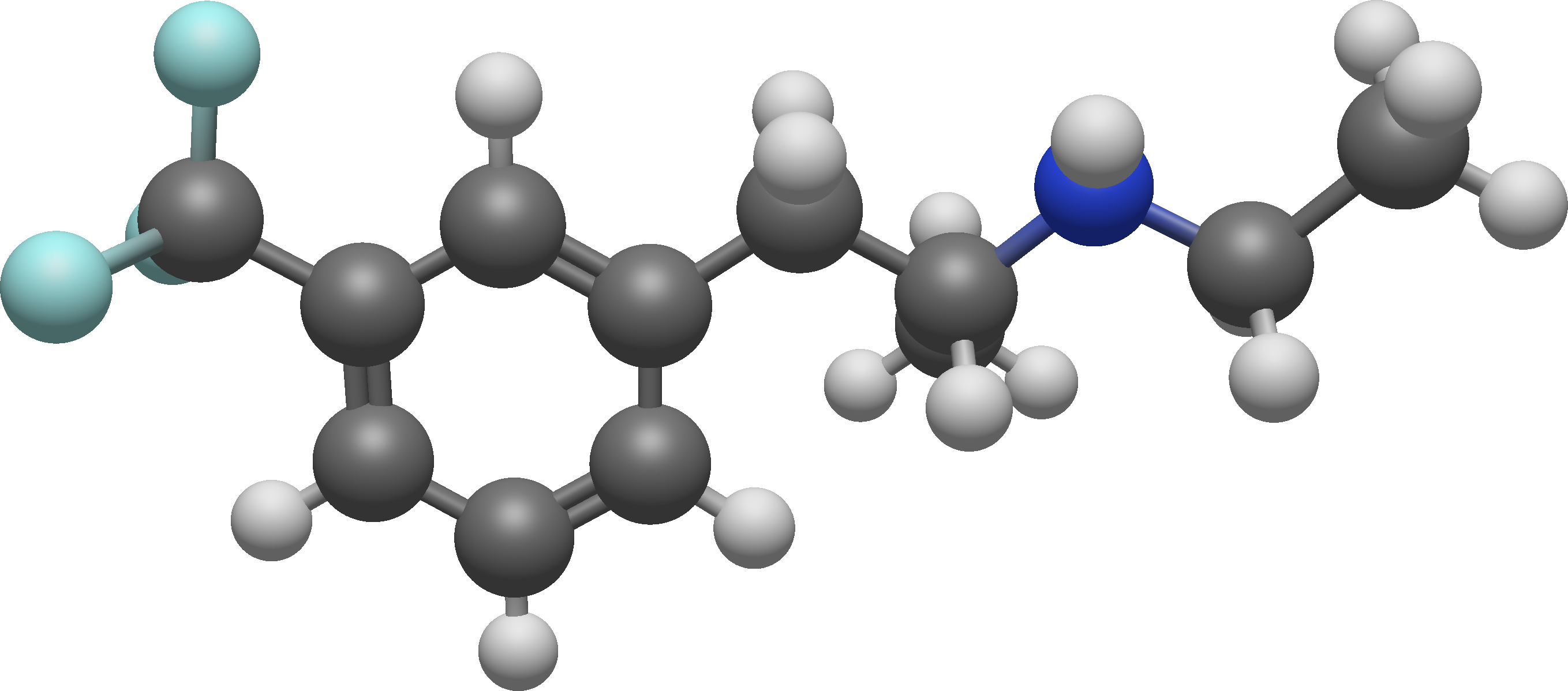

Clinical data
- ATC code: None

Identifiers
- IUPAC name: (2R)-N-ethyl-1-[3-(trifluoromethyl)phenyl]-2-propanamine
- CAS Number: 37577-24-5 5220-89-3 (HCl)
- PubChem CID: 65801
- ChemSpider: 59217
- UNII: 953A94Y45B
- CompTox Dashboard (EPA): DTXSID60191009
- ECHA InfoCard: 100.164.235

Chemical and physical data
- Formula: C_{12}H_{16}F_{3}N
- Molar mass: 231.262 g·mol^{−1}
- 3D model (JSmol): Interactive image
- SMILES: FC(F)(F)c1cccc(c1)C[C@H](NCC)C
- InChI: InChI=1S/C12H16F3N/c1-3-16-9(2)7-10-5-4-6-11(8-10)12(13,14)15/h4-6,8-9,16H,3,7H2,1-2H3/t9-/m1/s1; Key:DBGIVFWFUFKIQN-SECBINFHSA-N

Levofenfluramine (INN), or (−)-3-trifluoromethyl-N-ethylamphetamine, also known as (−)-fenfluramine or (R)-fenfluramine, is a drug of the amphetamine family that, itself (i.e., in enantiopure form), was never marketed alone. It is the levorotatory enantiomer of fenfluramine, the racemic form of the compound, whereas the dextrorotatory enantiomer is dexfenfluramine. Both fenfluramine and dexfenfluramine are anorectic agents that have been used clinically in the treatment of obesity (and hence, levofenfluramine has been as well since it is a component of fenfluramine). However, they have since been discontinued due to reports of causing cardiovascular conditions such as valvular heart disease and pulmonary hypertension, adverse effects that are likely to be caused by excessive stimulation of 5-HT_{2B} receptors expressed on heart valves.

Dexfenfluramine is believed to be solely responsible for the appetite suppressant properties of fenfluramine, of which it has been demonstrated to mediate predominantly via activation of postsynaptic 5-HT_{1B} and 5-HT_{2C} receptors through a combination of indirect serotonin releasing agent and direct serotonin receptor agonist activities (the latter of which are mediated fully by its active metabolite dexnorfenfluramine). Contrarily, levofenfluramine is thought to contribute only to unwanted side effects. Paradoxically, however, it has been shown that levofenfluramine too acts as a relatively potent releaser of serotonin, though with approximately 1/3 of the efficacy of dexfenfluramine. As such, it would be expected to possess some degree of appetite suppressant properties as well, yet it does not. A potential explanation as to why levofenfluramine is not similarly an effective anorectic is that it has also been found to behave as a dopamine receptor antagonist, which, as dopamine antagonists like atypical antipsychotics are associated with causing increased appetite and weight gain—effects that their actions on dopamine receptors have been implicated in playing a role in the development of, is an action that could in theory cancel out the hypothetical serotonergically-mediated appetite suppressant effects of the compound. However, this is speculation and has not been proven.

Levonorfenfluramine, an active metabolite of levofenfluramine, is also a fairly potent serotonin releasing agent (with a potency of approximately 1/2 that of norfenfluramine and 1/6 that of dexfenfluramine) and, similarly to dexnorfenfluramine, is a 5-HT_{2B} and 5-HT_{2C} receptor agonist, as well as a somewhat less potent norepinephrine reuptake inhibitor (about 1/2 that of its efficacy as a serotonin releaser). As such, it likely contributes significantly to the biological activity—though not necessarily appetite suppressant effects—of not only levofenfluramine but of racemic fenfluramine as well. In contrast to levonorfenfluramine, levofenfluramine is virtually inactive as a reuptake inhibitor or releaser of norepinephrine, and neither compound has any effect on dopamine reuptake or release.

Levofenfluramine has been found to increase oxytocin levels in rodents similarly to dexfenfluramine, albeit with lower potency.

== See also ==
- Fenfluramine
- Dexfenfluramine
- Norfenfluramine
