= 4-Methylthioamphetamine =

Chemical compound

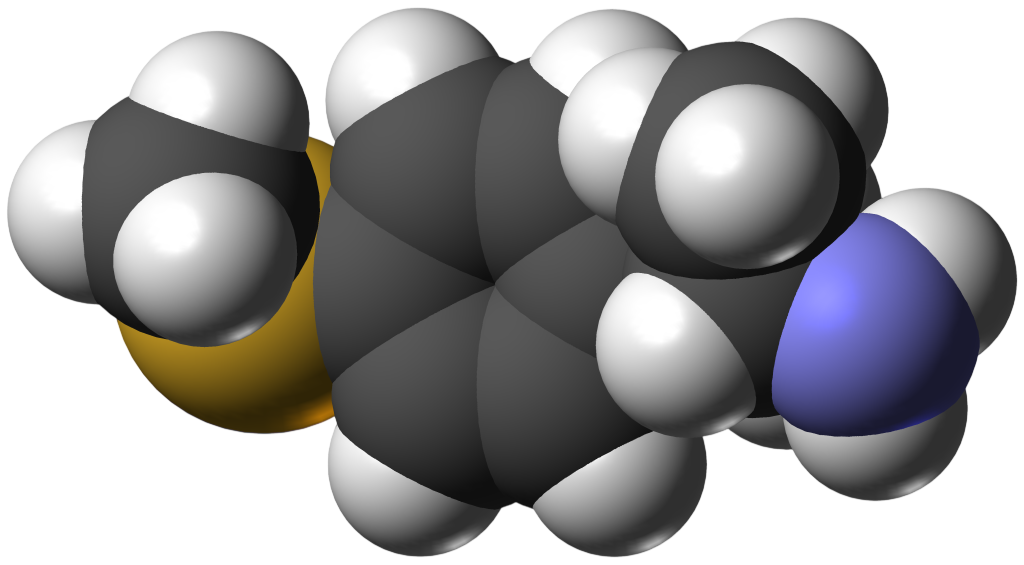

Clinical data
- Other names: 4-MTA; MTA; para-Methylthioamphetamine; p-Methylthioamphetamine
- Routes of administration: Oral
- Drug class: Serotonin releasing agent; Monoamine oxidase inhibitor

Legal status
- Legal status: BR: Class F2 (Prohibited psychotropics); CA: Schedule I; DE: Anlage I (Authorized scientific use only); UK: Class A; US: Schedule I; UN: Psychotropic Schedule I

Identifiers
- IUPAC name: 1-[4-(Methylsulfanyl)phenyl]propan-2-amine
- CAS Number: 14116-06-4 (R/S) 1030831-15-2 (R) 943816-61-3 (S)
- PubChem CID: 151900
- ChemSpider: 133883
- UNII: 6JP2T8KXTR
- KEGG: C22804
- ChEMBL: ChEMBL6467
- CompTox Dashboard (EPA): DTXSID90894854

Chemical and physical data
- Formula: C_{10}H_{15}NS
- Molar mass: 181.30 g·mol^{−1}
- 3D model (JSmol): Interactive image
- SMILES: NC(C)CC(C=C1)=CC=C1SC
- InChI: InChI=1S/C10H15NS/c1-8(11)7-9-3-5-10(12-2)6-4-9/h3-6,8H,7,11H2,1-2H3; Key:OLEWMKVPSUCNLG-UHFFFAOYSA-N

4-Methylthioamphetamine (4-MTA), also known as para-methylthioamphetamine (MTA), is a serotonergic designer drug of the amphetamine family developed in the 1990s by a team led by David E. Nichols, an American pharmacologist and medical chemist, at Purdue University. It acts as a dual non-neurotoxic highly selective serotonin releasing agent (SSRA) and monoamine oxidase inhibitor (MAOI). 4-MTA is the methylthio derivative of amphetamine.

== Use and effects ==
4-MTA is a strong serotonin releaser similar to para-methoxyamphetamine (PMA), which can cause pronounced hyperthermia potentially resulting in organ failure and death. Therefore, the major neuropharmacological effect is an increased release of serotonin, and the inhibition of serotonin uptake of monoamine oxidase A (MAO-A). The combination of the releasing of serotonin from neurons and the prevention of breaking this neurotransmitter down again, leads to dangerous serotonin syndrome. The serotonin syndrome is a hyper serotonergic state, which can become fatal and is a side effect of serotonergic drugs. The symptoms of serotonin syndrome caused by 4-MTA are described in the Report on the Risk Assessment of 4-MTA and may include:

- Euphoria
- Drowsiness
- Sustained rapid eye movement
- Hyperreflexia – overreaction of the reflexes
- Agitation
- Restlessness
- Tachycardia – fast heart rate
- Headache
- Clumsiness
- Disorientation
- Intoxication – feeling drunk and dizzy
- Rigidity
- Rapid muscle contraction and relaxation in the ankle causing abnormal movements of the foot
- Muscle contraction and relaxation in the jaw
- Muscle twitching leading to hyperthermia
- Shivering
- High body temperature
- Sweating
- Altered mental status (including confusion and hypomania – a 'happy drunk state')

Another effect is the increase of the secretion of several hormones, like adrenocorticotropic hormone (ACTH), corticosterone, prolactin, oxytocin, and renin induced by 4-MTA through stimulation of serotonergic neurotransmission.

There has been suggested that 4-MTA because of its slow onset of action, is more dangerous than other designer drugs. Users of the drug rapidly take another dose because they assume the first was inadequate; thus increasing the possibility of an overdose. (EMCDDA, 1999)

Today the knowledge about the effects of 4-MTA is narrow, because of very limited research and experimental data. The only four studies that are conducted show a weak effect on dopamine and noradrenaline. This study was executed with a single dose of 4-MTA, no study where the effect of multiple doses 4-MTA where researched exist up to date.

== Pharmacology ==
=== Pharmacodynamics ===
4-MTA is a monoamine releasing agent (MRA). It was originally characterized as a selective serotonin releasing agent (SRA). However, the drug was subsequently found to more weakly induce the release of dopamine as well. 4-MTA shows a similar balance of monoamine reuptake inhibition as MDMA.

In addition to its MRA activity, 4-MTA is a potent monoamine oxidase A (MAO-A) inhibitor. Its IC_{50} for MAO-A inhibition has been reported to be 250 nM. The combination of serotonin release induction and MAOI activity is likely responsible for the severe serotonergic toxicity and hyperthermia that has occurred with 4-MTA.

4-MTA shows significant affinity for the serotonin 5-HT_{2A} and 5-HT_{2C} receptors, but not for the serotonin 5-HT_{1A} receptor. Its affinities for these receptors have been reported to be 1,500 nM, 1,800 nM, and >18,000 nM, respectively. 4-MTA is also a potent agonist of the mouse and rat trace amine-associated receptor 1 (TAAR1). However, it is inactive at the human TAAR1 (EC_{50} > 10,000 nM).

4-MTA has been found to dose-dependently and robustly increase oxytocin levels in rodents similarly to MDMA.

In animal drug discrimination tests, 4-MTA substitutes for MDMA but does not substitute for amphetamine, suggesting that it has entactogen-like but no stimulant-like effects. Similarly, 4-MTA does not substitute for DOM in drug discrimination tests, suggesting that it lacks psychedelic-like effects.

=== Pharmacokinetics ===
==== Metabolism ====
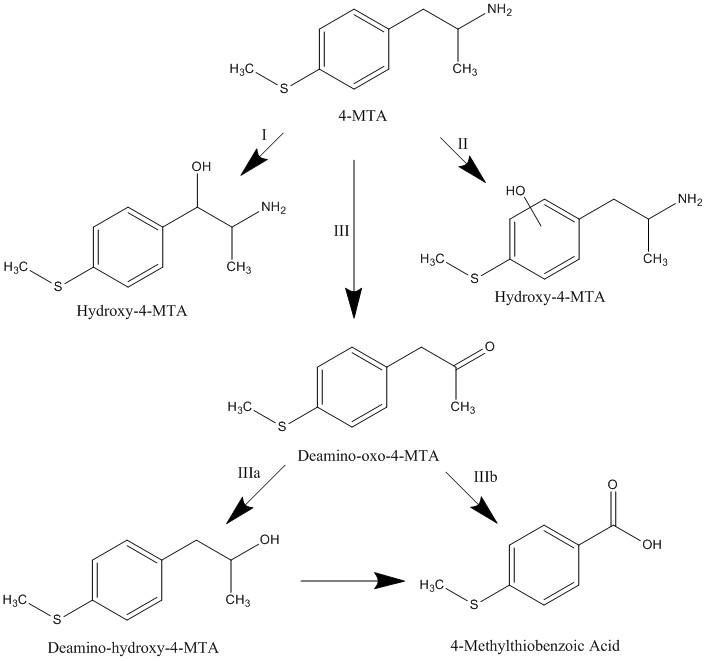
4-MTA metabolism in rats.

4-MTA undergoes limited biotransformation, the metabolic pathways of the metabolites in humans is postulated in the following steps:

1. β-Hydroxylation of the side chain to 4-hydroxy-4-methylthioamphetamine (step I).
2. Ring hydroxylation to a phenolic structure (step II).
3. Oxidative deamination to form an oxo metabolite, followed by (step III):
  - reduction into the corresponding alcohol (step IIIa),
  - degradation of the side chain to 4-methylthiobenzoic acid (step IIIb).

The main metabolite was identified as 4-methylthiobenzoic acid. This compound leads to bioactivation (toxification), since the metabolite increases dramatically the sensitivity to the reduction in ATP content. The biotransformation shows great similarities to the metabolic pathway of the structurally related 4-methoxyamphetamine

== Chemistry ==
In a procedure analogous to the production of other amphetamines, 4-MTA has been prepared from 4-(methylthio)phenylacetone by the Leuckart reaction and the reaction byproducts have been characterized.

== History ==
=== First appearance ===
In 1997, the Forensic Science Laboratory of the Netherlands received reports of three unrelated drug deaths. The substance in question was a new ring-substituted amphetamine derivative. In 1998 two additional cases of this still unknown compound were added to the list, and the incidents were reported to the IPSC (Institut de Police Scientifique et de Criminologie, University of Lausanne, Switzerland). In both the Netherlands and Switzerland, the unknown compound was encountered in the hydrochloride salt form, and pictures of the different tablets were compared to each other. After an investigation, it appeared that in other European countries such as the United Kingdom and Germany the derivative was also encountered. The new drug even got as far as Australia. After analytical research, the compound was identified as 4-methylthioamphetamine (4-MTA). This was an already known compound originally only intended for pharmacological studies on animals. The studies of 4-MTA by David Nichols were then linked to the tablets found in all the different countries.

=== Development ===
Addiction experts in psychiatry, chemistry, pharmacology, forensic science, epidemiology, and the police and legal services engaged in delphic analysis regarding 20 popular recreational drugs. 4-MTA was ranked 12th in dependence, 10th in physical harm, and 17th in social harm.

4-MTA was developed by the research team led by David Nichols but was intended to be used only as an agent for laboratory research into the serotonin transporter protein. Nichols was reportedly sad to see 4-MTA appear as a drug of abuse on the street, and after finding out his research was used for the creation of dangerous serotonin releasing drugs he stated: "I was stunned. I had published information ultimately led to human death." Nichols intentions were to discover how MDMA worked in the brain to eventually find a positive use for it in psychotherapy. Nichols studied thereby molecules with similar structure, including 4-MTA. Between 1992 and 1997 they published three papers on the effects of this drug in rats and the idea that it could potentially be used in the treatment of depression and be a potential replacement for Prozac. Without the knowledge of Nichols and his team, others synthesized the drugs into a tablet. These tablets were known by their street name, 'flatliners'. Nichols' laboratory had published that the rats perceived the effects of 4-MTA to be like those of ecstasy, which was probably the motivation for its production and distribution to humans. Nichols also said, "I have never considered my research to be dangerous, and in fact hoped one day to develop medicines to help people." Because of the 4-MTA relating death, Nichols' laboratory was asked to study the human effects of other materials they have studied, to avoid likewise situation as with 4-MTA. Most of the molecules the laboratory further had published could not kill in reasonable dosages.

=== Use and availability ===
The typical tablets sold on the street contained approximately between 100–140 mg 4-MTA. 4-MTA was briefly sold in smart shops in the Netherlands, though was soon banned by the Dutch government after serious side-effects started to emerge. The Union of Smartshop Owners decided to leave it out of their assortment after they discovered the drug had only been tested on rats. It was also briefly sold on the black market as MDMA during the late 1990s, mainly in the US, but proved unpopular due to its high risk of severe side effects (several deaths were reported) and relative lack of positive euphoria.

== See also ==
- Substituted amphetamine
- 4-Methylthiomethamphetamine
- N,N-Dimethyl-4-methylthioamphetamine
- Aleph (psychedelic)
- para-Methoxyamphetamine
- 4-Fluoroamphetamine
- para-Chloroamphetamine
