= Amiflamine =

Chemical compound

Clinical data
- Other names: FLA-336; (S)-2-Methyl-4-(dimethylamino)amphetamine
- Routes of administration: Oral
- ATC code: None

Legal status
- Legal status: In general: uncontrolled

Identifiers
- IUPAC name: 4-[(2S)-2-Aminopropyl]-N,N,3-trimethylaniline
- CAS Number: 77518-07-1
- PubChem CID: 71221
- ChemSpider: 64356
- UNII: NE25WV9C8S
- ChEMBL: ChEMBL30344
- CompTox Dashboard (EPA): DTXSID00228222

Chemical and physical data
- Formula: C_{12}H_{20}N_{2}
- Molar mass: 192.306 g·mol^{−1}
- 3D model (JSmol): Interactive image
- SMILES: N(c1cc(c(cc1)C[C@@H](N)C)C)(C)C
- InChI: InChI=1S/C12H20N2/c1-9-7-12(14(3)4)6-5-11(9)8-10(2)13/h5-7,10H,8,13H2,1-4H3/t10-/m0/s1; Key:HFQMYSHATTXRTC-JTQLQIEISA-N

Amiflamine (developmental code name FLA-336), also known (S)-2-methyl-4-(dimethylamino)amphetamine, is a reversible inhibitor of monoamine oxidase A (MAO-A), thereby being a RIMA, and, to a lesser extent, semicarbazide-sensitive amine oxidase (SSAO) inhibitor, as well as a serotonin releasing agent (SRA). It is a derivative of the phenethylamine and amphetamine families. The (+)-enantiomer is the active stereoisomer.

Amiflamine shows preference for inhibiting MAO-A in serotonergic relative to noradrenergic and dopaminergic neurons. In other words, at low doses, it can be used to selectively inhibit MAO-A enzymes in serotonin cells, whereas at higher doses it loses its selectivity. This property is attributed to amiflamine's higher affinity for the serotonin transporter over the norepinephrine and dopamine transporters, as transporter-mediated carriage is required for amiflamine to enter monoaminergic neurons.

== See also ==
- Substituted amphetamine
