= N,N-Dimethyl-4-methylthioamphetamine =

DMMTA

Clinical data
- Other names: DMMTA; N,N-Dimethyl-4-MTA; 4-Methylthio-N,N-dimethylamphetamine; 4-MTDMA; PAL-1062; PAL1062
- Drug class: Monoamine releasing agent; Monoamine oxidase inhibitor; Entactogen
- ATC code: None

Identifiers
- IUPAC name: N,N-dimethyl-1-(4-methylsulfanylphenyl)propan-2-amine
- PubChem CID: 46882974
- ChemSpider: 24657499
- ChEMBL: ChEMBL1078835

Chemical and physical data
- Formula: C_{12}H_{19}NS
- Molar mass: 209.35 g·mol^{−1}
- 3D model (JSmol): Interactive image
- SMILES: CC(CC1=CC=C(C=C1)SC)N(C)C
- InChI: InChI=1S/C12H19NS/c1-10(13(2)3)9-11-5-7-12(14-4)8-6-11/h5-8,10H,9H2,1-4H3; Key:NFRBJBFYUNQIQP-UHFFFAOYSA-N

N,N-Dimethyl-4-methylthioamphetamine (DMMTA or N,N-dimethyl-4-MTA; code name PAL-1062), also known as 4-methylthio-N,N-dimethylamphetamine (4-MTDMA), is a monoamine releasing agent (MRA) of the amphetamine family related to 4-methylthioamphetamine (4-MTA) and 4-methylthiomethamphetamine (4-MTMA or NMMTA).

It has been described as an MRA of serotonin and dopamine that lacks induction of aortic contraction in vitro and hence may lack concomitant norepinephrine release (i.e., it may be a serotonin–dopamine releasing agent (SDRA)). However, EC_{50} values for monoamine release by 4-MTDMA were not reported. 4-MTDMA is a partial releaser of serotonin rather than a full releaser, with a maximal efficacy for induction of serotonin release of either 25% or 50% relative to the full serotonin releasers MDMA or para-chloroamphetamine (PCA).

In addition to its MRA activity, 4-MTDMA is a fairly potent monoamine oxidase A (MAO-A) inhibitor, with an IC_{50} of 2,100 nM. Potent monoamine oxidase inhibition by amphetamines has been associated with dangerous and sometimes fatal toxicity in humans.

== See also ==
- Substituted amphetamine
- Dimethylamphetamine
