= Norfenfluramine =

Never-marketed drug of the amphetamine family

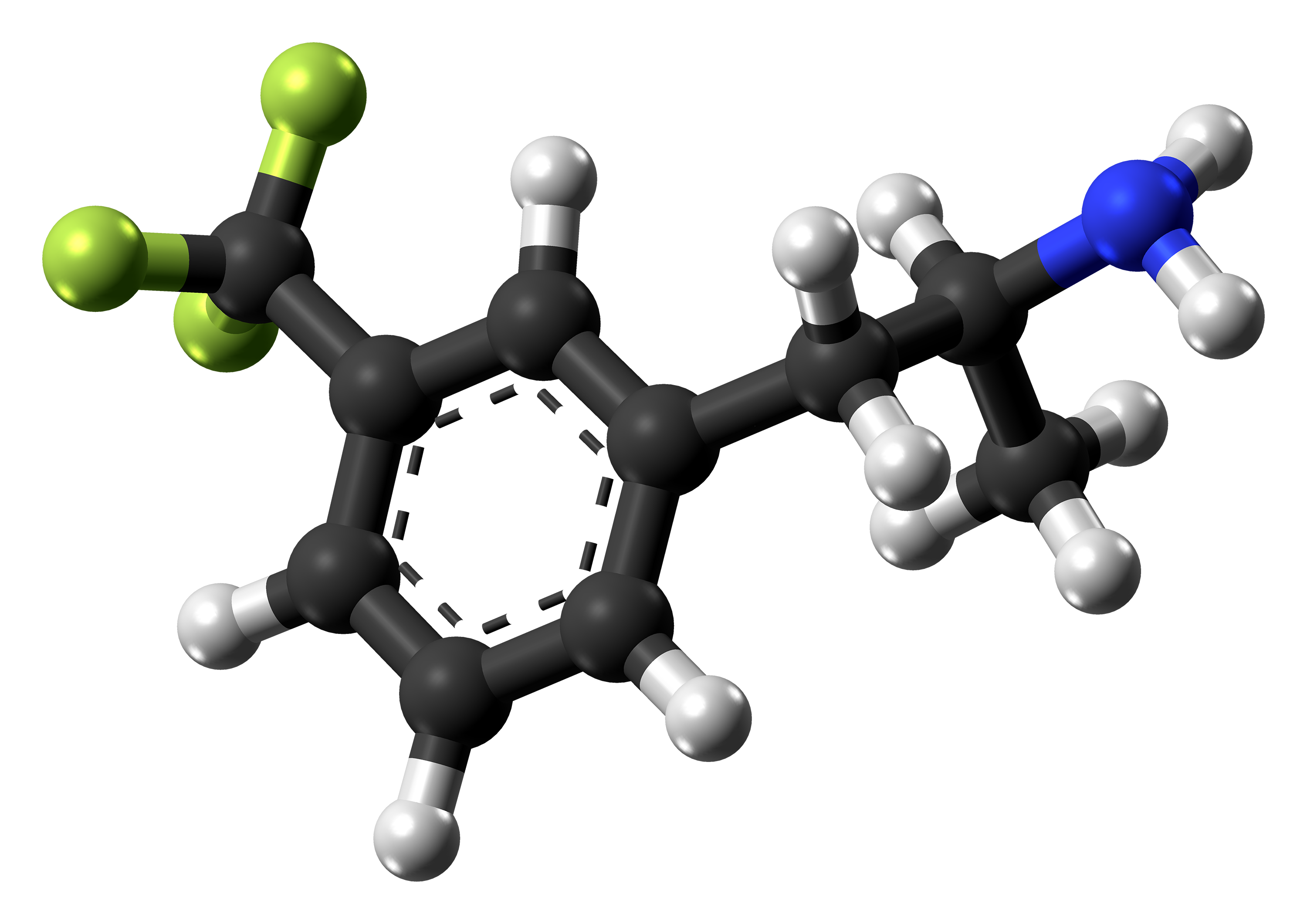

Clinical data
- Other names: 3-Trifluoromethylamphetamine; 3-TFMA; Desethylfenfluramine; JP-92

Identifiers
- IUPAC name: 1-[3-(trifluoromethyl)phenyl]propan-2-amine
- CAS Number: 19036-73-8
- PubChem CID: 15897
- IUPHAR/BPS: 215
- ChemSpider: 15108
- UNII: CLX07A6ZIY
- ChEBI: CHEBI:125411
- ChEMBL: ChEMBL1979333
- CompTox Dashboard (EPA): DTXSID60904717

Chemical and physical data
- Formula: C_{10}H_{12}F_{3}N
- Molar mass: 203.208 g·mol^{−1}
- 3D model (JSmol): Interactive image
- SMILES: FC(F)(F)c1cccc(c1)CC(N)C
- InChI: InChI=1S/C10H12F3N/c1-7(14)5-8-3-2-4-9(6-8)10(11,12)13/h2-4,6-7H,5,14H2,1H3; Key:MLBHFBKZUPLWBD-UHFFFAOYSA-N

Norfenfluramine, or 3-trifluoromethylamphetamine, is a never-marketed drug of the amphetamine family and a major active metabolite of the appetite suppressants fenfluramine and benfluorex. The compound is a racemic mixture of two enantiomers with differing activities, dexnorfenfluramine and levonorfenfluramine.

== Pharmacology ==
Norfenfluramine acts as a serotonin–norepinephrine releasing agent (SNRA) and as a potent serotonin 5-HT_{2A}, 5-HT_{2B}, and 5-HT_{2C} receptor agonist. Both enantiomers of norfenfluramine are active as monoamine releasing agents, although dexnorfenfluramine is more potent than levonorfenfluramine. Similarly, both enantiomers are active as serotonin 5-HT_{2} receptor agonists, but dexnorfenfluramine is likewise more potent than levonorfenfluramine.

Norfenfluramine is of similar potency as fenfluramine as a serotonin releaser but is substantially more potent as a norepinephrine and dopamine releaser. The drug is also far more potent than fenfluramine as an agonist of the serotonin 5-HT_{2} receptors.

The action of norfenfluramine on serotonin 5-HT_{2B} receptors on heart valves leads to a characteristic pattern of heart failure following proliferation of cardiac fibroblasts on the tricuspid valve, known as cardiac fibrosis. This side effect led to the withdrawal of fenfluramine as an anorectic medication worldwide and to the withdrawal of benfluorex in Europe.

In spite of acting as a serotonin 5-HT_{2A} receptor agonist, norfenfluramine is described as non-hallucinogenic. However, hallucinations have occasionally been reported with large doses of fenfluramine, which itself is a much weaker serotonin 5-HT_{2A} receptor agonist than norfenfluramine but produces norfenfluramine as a major active metabolite. Dexnorfenfluramine produces the head-twitch response, a behavioral proxy of psychedelic effects, in rodents.

Norfenfluramine has been found to act as an agonist of the trace amine-associated receptor 1 (TAAR1). Dexnorfenfluramine is a very weak human TAAR1 agonist (43% of maximum in screen at a concentration of 10,000 nM), whereas levonorfenfluramine is inactive as a human TAAR1 agonist.

Monoamine release of norfenfluramine and related agents (EC_{50}, nM)
Compound	NE	DA	5-HT	Ref
Dextroamphetamine	6.6–7.2	5.8–24.8	698–1,765	
Levoamphetamine	9.5	27.7	ND	
Dextromethamphetamine	12.3–14.3	8.5–40.4	736–1,292	
Levomethamphetamine	28.5	416	4,640	
Dextroethylamphetamine	28.8	44.1	333.0	
Fenfluramine	739	>10,000 (RI)	79.3–108	
Dexfenfluramine	302	>10,000	51.7	
Levfenfluramine	>10,000	>10,000	147	
Norfenfluramine	168–170	1,900–1,925	104	
Dexnorfenfluramine	72.7	924	59.3	
Levnorfenfluramine	474	>10,000	287	
Phentermine	28.8–39.4	262	2,575–3,511	
Chlorphentermine	>10,000 (RI)	935–2,650	18.2–30.9	
Notes: The smaller the value, the more strongly the drug releases the neurotransmitter. The assays were done in rat brain synaptosomes and human potencies may be different. See also Monoamine releasing agent § Activity profiles for a larger table with more compounds. Refs:

Norfenfluramine and related agents at the serotonin 5-HT_{2} receptors
Compound	5-HT_{2A}			5-HT_{2B}			5-HT_{2C}		
Compound	K_{i} (nM)	EC_{50} (nM)	E_{max} (%)	K_{i} (nM)	EC_{50} (nM)	E_{max} (%)	K_{i} (nM)	EC_{50} (nM)	E_{max} (%)
Fenfluramine	5,216	4,131	15%	4,134	ND	ND	3,183	ND	ND
Dexfenfluramine	11,107	>10,000	ND	5,099	379	38%	6,245	362	80%
Levofenfluramine	5,463	5,279	43%	5,713	1,248	47%	3,415	360	84%
Norfenfluramine	2,316	ND	ND	52.1	ND	ND	557	ND	ND
Dexnorfenfluramine	1,516	630	88%	11.2	18.4	73%	324	13	100%
Levonorfenfluramine	3,841	1,565	93%	47.8	357	71%	814	18	80%
Phentermine	>10,000	IA or ND	IA or ND	>10,000	IA or ND	IA or ND	>10,000	1,394	66%
Chlorphentermine	ND	>10,000	ND	ND	5,370	ND	ND	6,456	ND
Notes: (1) The smaller the K_{i} or EC_{50} value, the more avidly the drug binds to or activates the receptor. The higher the E_{max} value, the more effectively the drug activates the receptor. (2) All values are for human receptors except for the 5-HT_{2A} and 5-HT_{2C} K_{i} values, which are for the rat receptors. Refs:

== See also ==
- Substituted amphetamine
