= Pyroglutamyl-histidyl-glycine =

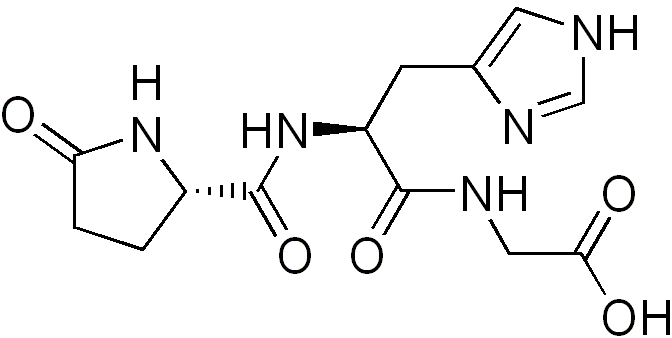

Names
- IUPAC name 2-[[(2S)-3-(4H-imidazol-4-yl)-2-[[(2S)-5-oxopyrrolidine-2-carbonyl]amino]propanoyl]amino]acetic acid

Identifiers
CAS Number	69275-10-1
3D model (JSmol)	Interactive image
ChemSpider	109067
PubChem CID	122313
CompTox Dashboard (EPA)	DTXSID20988992
- InChI: InChI=1S/C13H17N5O5/c19-10-2-1-8(17-10)13(23)18-9(3-7-4-14-6-16-7)12(22)15-5-11(20)21/h4,6-9H,1-3,5H2,(H,15,22)(H,17,19)(H,18,23)(H,20,21)/t7?,8-,9-/m0/s1 Key: VTKWFWXOVZIATL-NPPUSCPJSA-N; InChI=1/C13H17N5O5/c19-10-2-1-8(17-10)13(23)18-9(3-7-4-14-6-16-7)12(22)15-5-11(20)21/h4,6-9H,1-3,5H2,(H,15,22)(H,17,19)(H,18,23)(H,20,21)/t7?,8-,9-/m0/s1 Key: VTKWFWXOVZIATL-NPPUSCPJBL
- SMILES: O=C2N[C@H](C(=O)N[C@H](C(=O)NCC(=O)O)CC/1/N=C\N=C\1)CC2

Properties
Chemical formula	C_{13}H_{17}N_{5}O_{5}
Molar mass	323.30 g/mol
- Except where otherwise noted, data are given for materials in their standard state (at 25 °C [77 °F], 100 kPa). verify (what is ?) Infobox references

Pyroglutamyl-histidyl-glycine (pEHG) is an endogenous tripeptide that acts as a tissue-specific antimitotic and selectively inhibits the proliferation of colon epithelial cells. Early research indicated that pEHG had anorectic effects in mice and was possibly involved in the pathophysiology of anorexia nervosa. However, subsequent studies have found that pEHG lacks anorectic effects and does not alter food intake in mice.
