= M-Cumenyl methylcarbamate =

m-Cumenyl methylcarbamate

Names
- Preferred IUPAC name 3-(Propan-2-yl)phenyl methylcarbamate
- Other names 3-Isopropylphenyl N-methylcarbamate; 3-Isopropylphenyl methylcarbamate; m-Cumenol methylcarbamate; m-Cumenyl methylcarbamate; m-Isopropylphenol methylcarbamate; m-Isopropylphenyl N-methylcarbamate; m-Isopropylphenyl methylcarbamate

Identifiers
| CAS Number | 64-00-6 |
| 3D model (JSmol) | Interactive image |
| ChemSpider | 5913 |
| ECHA InfoCard | 100.000.521 |
| PubChem CID | 6143 |
| UNII | 27502G8UZX |
| CompTox Dashboard (EPA) | DTXSID1040324 |
- InChI: InChI=1S/C11H15NO2/c1-8(2)9-5-4-6-10(7-9)14-11(13)12-3/h4-8H,1-3H3,(H,12,13) Key: GYKXQTKSWLAUIT-UHFFFAOYSA-N; InChI=1/C11H15NO2/c1-8(2)9-5-4-6-10(7-9)14-11(13)12-3/h4-8H,1-3H3,(H,12,13) Key: GYKXQTKSWLAUIT-UHFFFAOYAN
- SMILES: O=C(Oc1cc(ccc1)C(C)C)NC

Properties
| Chemical formula | C_{11}H_{15}NO_{2} |
| Molar mass | 193.246 g·mol^{−1} |

Hazards
- Lethal dose or concentration (LD, LC)
| LD_{50} (median dose) | 16 mg/kg (oral, rat) |
- Except where otherwise noted, data are given for materials in their standard state (at 25 °C [77 °F], 100 kPa). Infobox references

m-Cumenyl methylcarbamate is an insecticide used on cotton, fruit, vegetable and field crops. As of 1998, the Environmental Protection Agency listed it as an unregistered pesticide in the United States.
