= UCD0168 =

Clinical data
- Other names: UCD-0168
- Drug class: Serotonin releasing agent
- ATC code: None

Identifiers
- IUPAC name: 1-methyl-3-((1R,5S)-8-methyl-8-azabicyclo[3.2.1]oct-2-en-3-yl)-1H-indole
- ChemSpider: 133323943

Chemical and physical data
- Formula: C_{17}H_{20}N_{2}
- Molar mass: 252.361 g·mol^{−1}
- 3D model (JSmol): Interactive image
- SMILES: CN1C=C(C2=C[C@@H](CC3)N(C)[C@@H]3C2)C4=C1C=CC=C4
- InChI: InChI=1S/C17H20N2/c1-18-11-16(15-5-3-4-6-17(15)18)12-9-13-7-8-14(10-12)19(13)2/h3-6,9,11,13-14H,7-8,10H2,1-2H3/t13-,14+/m1/s1; Key:BBKRJDONOLKJBG-KGLIPLIRSA-N

UCD0168 is a serotonin releasing agent (SRA) of the tropane family related to the tryptamines. It is potent, selective, and shows full efficacy as an SRA in serotonin transporter (SERT)-transfected HEK293T cells. This includes selectivity for the SERT over the dopamine transporter (DAT) and norepinephrine transporter (NET). However, the drug also shows substantial interaction with the serotonin 5-HT_{3} receptor and the sigma σ_{1} and σ_{2} receptor (92.5–95.1% binding inhibition, relative to 94.9% at the SERT). The chemical synthesis of UCD0168 has been described. Analogues of UCD0168 have been described, for instance UCD0820, which is a poorly selective SRA with partial releasing efficacy. UCD0168 was first described in the scientific literature by David E. Olson and colleagues at the University of California, Davis (UCD) in 2025.
