= Benfluorex =

Withdrawn diabetes drug

Clinical data
- Trade names: Mediator
- AHFS/Drugs.com: International Drug Names
- Routes of administration: By mouth
- ATC code: A10BX06 (WHO)

Legal status
- Legal status: BR: Class C1 (Other controlled substances)

Pharmacokinetic data
- Excretion: Kidney

Identifiers
- IUPAC name: (RS)-2-({1-[3-(trifluoromethyl)phenyl]propan- 2-yl}amino)ethyl benzoate
- CAS Number: 23602-78-0
- PubChem CID: 2318
- DrugBank: DB09022
- ChemSpider: 2228
- UNII: 403FO0NQG3
- KEGG: D07192
- ChEMBL: ChEMBL400599
- CompTox Dashboard (EPA): DTXSID5048471
- ECHA InfoCard: 100.041.601

Chemical and physical data
- Formula: C_{19}H_{20}F_{3}NO_{2}
- Molar mass: 351.369 g·mol^{−1}
- 3D model (JSmol): Interactive image
- Chirality: Racemic mixture
- SMILES: FC(F)(F)c1cccc(c1)CC(NCCOC(=O)c2ccccc2)C
- InChI: InChI=1S/C19H20F3NO2/c1-14(12-15-6-5-9-17(13-15)19(20,21)22)23-10-11-25-18(24)16-7-3-2-4-8-16/h2-9,13-14,23H,10-12H2,1H3; Key:CJAVTWRYCDNHSM-UHFFFAOYSA-N

Benfluorex, sold under the brand name Mediator, is an anorectic and hypolipidemic agent that is structurally related to fenfluramine (a substituted amphetamine). It acts mostly as a prodrug of norfenfluramine. It was fraudulently claimed to improve glycemic control and decrease insulin resistance in people with poorly controlled type-2 diabetes through norfenfluramine acting as a 5-HT2B receptor agonist

It was on the market between 1976 and 2009, and is thought to have caused between 500 and 2,000 deaths. It was patented and manufactured by the French pharmaceutical company Servier. However, Servier has wittingly concealed the nature of Benfluorex, so that it would avoid the ban of Fenfluramine-related medications, which were mostly marketed by Servier (Racemic Fenfluramine/Ponderal, Dexfenfluramine/Isomeride) Servier has been found to be aware of the Fenfluramine-structure nature when starting marketing Benfluorex as an anti diabetic. The mechanism of action of Benfluorex was the anoretic property that is shared with the other Fenfluramine-related compounds. In fact, Benfluorex acts as a prodrug to norfenfluramine, a worldwide withdrawn anorectic because of its high incidence of cardiac fibrosis which is completely out of line for treating type 2 diabetes.

In 2023, a French court fined Servier €415m on appeal after finding it guilty of deception and manslaughter, as benfluorex's mechanism of action was fraudulently concealed, as Benfluorex was marketed after withdrawal of the any marketed fenfluramine anorectic (fenfluramine/phentermine, dexfenfluramine, clobenzorex, mefenorex, etc) because of their serious side effects like cardiac fibrosis and pulmonary hypertension (Benfluorex also shares the same side effects, but they were completely concealed, even though there were several reports of heart failure).

== Drug withdrawn ==
On 18 December 2009, the European Medicines Agency recommended the withdrawal of all medicines containing benfluorex in the European Union, because their risks, particularly the risk of heart valve disease (fenfluramine-like cardiovascular side effects), are greater than their benefits. Thus Frachon et al. showed a higher rate of unexplained valvular heart disease in people taking benfluorex. Weill et al. looked at over 1 million people with diabetes demonstrating a higher hospitalization rate in benfluorex takers for valvular heart disease. In France, the medication had been marketed by Servier as an adjuvant antidiabetic under the name Mediator. The drug was on the market between 1976 and 2009, and is thought to have caused between 500 and 2,000 deaths. The drug was also used in Spain, Portugal, and Cyprus.

On March 29, 2021, a French court fined Servier €2.7m (£2.3m) after finding it guilty of deception and manslaughter, with Mediator linked to the deaths of up to 2,000 people. The former executive Jean-Philippe Seta was sentenced to a suspended jail sentence of four years. The French medicines agency, accused of failing to act quickly enough on warnings about the drug, was fined €303,000. The pharmaceutical group was later additionally convicted of charges of fraud.

Fenfluramine, a related drug, had been withdrawn from the market in 1997 after reports of heart valve disease, pulmonary hypertension, and development of cardiac fibrosis. This side effect is mediated by the metabolite norfenfluramine on 5HT_{2B} receptors of heart valves, leading to a characteristic pattern of heart failure following proliferation of cardiac fibroblasts on the tricuspid valve. Both fenfluramine and benfluorex form norfenfluramine as a metabolite. This side effect led to the withdrawal of fenfluramine as an anorectic drug worldwide, and later to the withdrawal of benfluorex in Europe.
