= Forensic science laboratory =

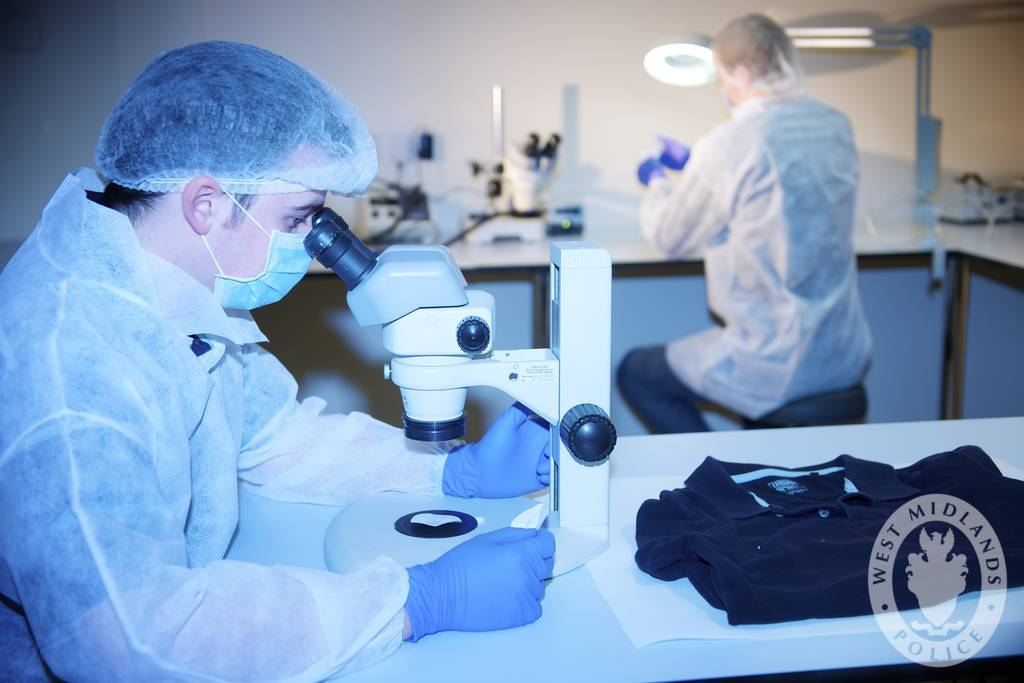
Work at the West Midlands Police Forensic Science Laboratory

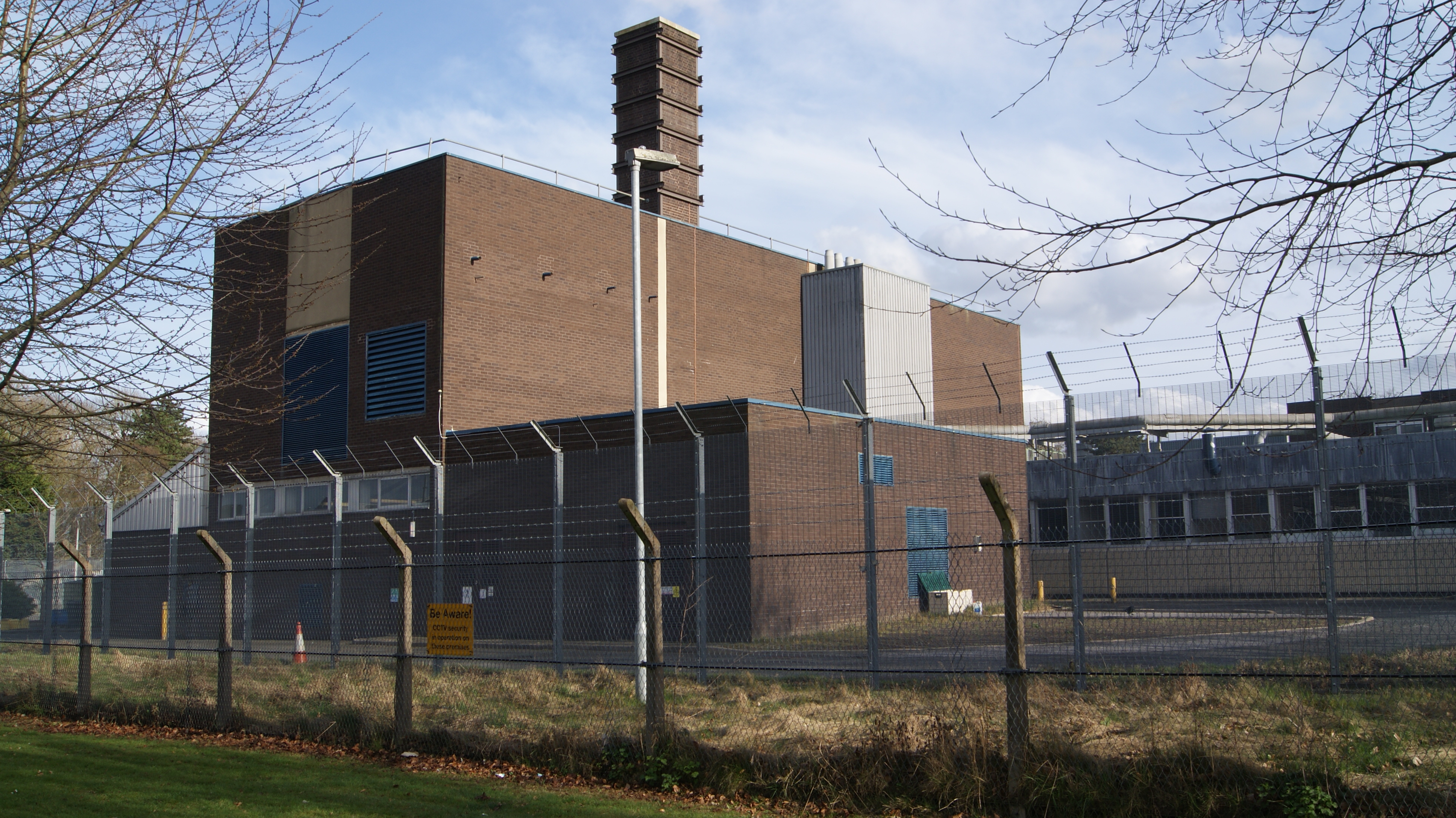
The Forensic Science Service building in Wetherby, England.

A forensic science laboratory is a scientific laboratory specialising in forensic science. Such laboratories may be run by private companies or the government but are often associated with the law enforcement infrastructure of a country.

== See also ==
- Forensic Science Service
