= 4-Methylthioethylamphetamine =

MTEA

Clinical data
- Drug class: serotonin reuptake inhibitor; monoamine oxidase inhibitor
- ATC code: none

Identifiers
- IUPAC name: N-Ethyl-1-[4-(methylsulfanyl)phenyl]propan-2-amine
- PubChem CID: 21978439
- ChemSpider: 24655435
- ChEMBL: ChEMBL1078039

Chemical and physical data
- Formula: C_{12}H_{19}NS
- Molar mass: 209.35 g·mol^{−1}
- 3D model (JSmol): Interactive image
- SMILES: CCNC(C)CC1=CC=C(C=C1)SC
- InChI: InChI=1S/C12H19NS/c1-4-13-10(2)9-11-5-7-12(14-3)8-6-11/h5-8,10,13H,4,9H2,1-3H3; Key:LAWDOCPCCFOXQO-UHFFFAOYSA-N

4-Methylthioethylamphetamine (4-MTEA) is a moderately potent serotonin reuptake inhibitor and a moderately potent reversible monoamine oxidase A inhibitor from the substituted amphetamine family; it is either an N-ethyl derivative of amphetamine or an N-ethylamfetamine derivative with an ethylthio group at the 4-position of the benzene ring.

== Pharmacology ==
=== Pharmacodynamics ===
MTEA acts as a monoamine reuptake inhibitor; at least, it is known to moderately inhibit the serotonin transporter with an IC_{50} value of 0.963 ± 0.076 µM (963 nM), which in the study indicated an inhibitory potency nearly equal to that of 3,4-methylenedioxymethamphetamine and 3,4-methylenedioxyamphetamine, although no human or animal studies have been conducted to confirm its empathogenic effect. MTEA acts as a moderate-potency reversible monoamine oxidase А inhibitor with an IC_{50} value of 1.80 ± 0.24 µM and no effect on MAO-B.
