= Dexfenfluramine =

Serotonergic anorectic medication

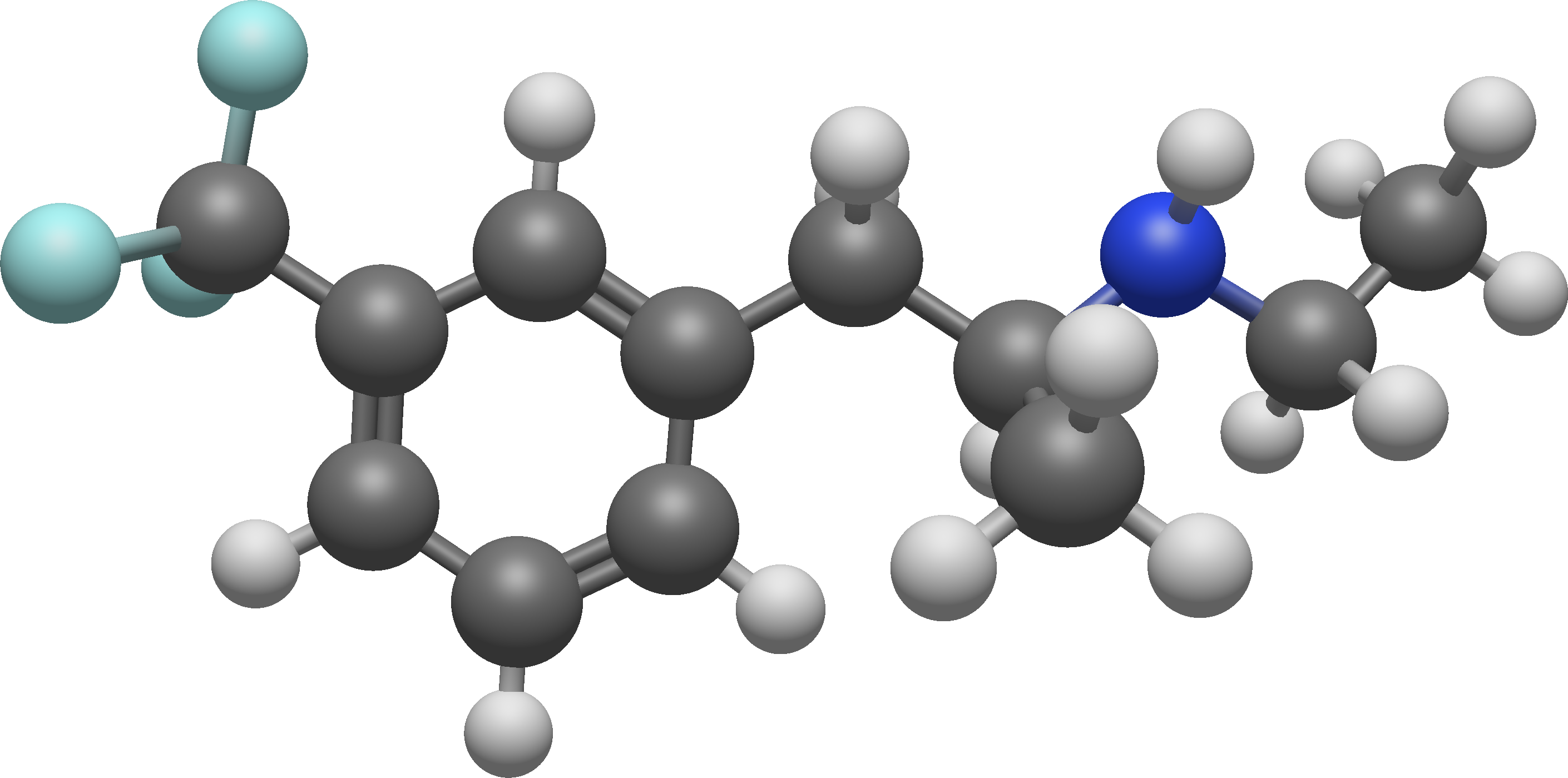

Clinical data
- Trade names: Redux
- Other names: Dextrofenfluramine; d-Fenfluramine; (S)-Fenfluramine; S-Fenfluramine; (+)-Fenfluramine; S(+)-Fenfluramine; (S)-(+)-Fenfluramine
- MedlinePlus: a682088
- ATC code: A08AA04 (WHO)

Legal status
- Legal status: BR: Class F4 (Other prohibited substances); US: Unscheduled; Withdrawn from market

Pharmacokinetic data
- Protein binding: 36%
- Metabolites: Dexnorfenfluramine
- Elimination half-life: 17–20 hours

Identifiers
- IUPAC name: (S)-N-Ethyl-1-[3-(trifluoromethyl)phenyl]-propan-2-amine
- CAS Number: 3239-44-9
- PubChem CID: 66265
- DrugBank: DB01191
- ChemSpider: 59646
- UNII: E35R3G56OV
- KEGG: D07805
- ChEBI: CHEBI:439329
- ChEMBL: ChEMBL248702
- CompTox Dashboard (EPA): DTXSID001025754

Chemical and physical data
- Formula: C_{12}H_{16}F_{3}N
- Molar mass: 231.262 g·mol^{−1}
- 3D model (JSmol): Interactive image
- SMILES: FC(F)(F)c1cccc(c1)C[C@@H](NCC)C
- InChI: InChI=1S/C12H16F3N/c1-3-16-9(2)7-10-5-4-6-11(8-10)12(13,14)15/h4-6,8-9,16H,3,7H2,1-2H3/t9-/m0/s1; Key:DBGIVFWFUFKIQN-VIFPVBQESA-N

Dexfenfluramine, formerly sold under the brand name Redux, is a serotonergic drug that was used as an appetite suppressant to promote weight loss. It is the d-enantiomer of fenfluramine and is structurally similar to amphetamine, but lacks any psychologically stimulating effects.

Dexfenfluramine was, for some years in the mid-1990s, approved by the United States Food and Drug Administration (FDA) for the purposes of weight loss. However, following multiple concerns about its cardiovascular side effects, the FDA withdrew the approval in 1997. After it was removed in the US, dexfenfluramine was also pulled out in other global markets. It was later superseded by sibutramine, which, although initially considered a safer alternative to both dexfenfluramine and fenfluramine, was likewise removed from the US market in 2010.

The drug was developed by Interneuron Pharmaceuticals, a company co-founded by Richard Wurtman, aimed at marketing discoveries by Massachusetts Institute of Technology scientists. Interneuron licensed the patent to Wyeth-Ayerst Laboratories. Although at the time of its release, some optimism prevailed that it might herald a new approach, there remained some reservations amongst neurologists, twenty-two of whom petitioned the FDA to delay approval. Their concern was based on the work of George A. Ricaurte, whose techniques and conclusions were later questioned.

Dexfenfluramine has been found to increase oxytocin levels in rodents, and with greater potency than levofenfluramine.

== See also ==
- Benfluorex
- Fenfluramine
- Levofenfluramine
- Norfenfluramine
