= 2-Methyl-MDA =

Chemical compound

Clinical data
- Routes of administration: Oral
- ATC code: none

Legal status
- Legal status: Uncontrolled (but may be covered under the Federal Analogue Act in the United States and under similar bills in other countries)

Identifiers
- IUPAC name: 1-(4-methyl-1,3-benzodioxol-5-yl)propan-2-amine
- CAS Number: 691876-73-0 204916-87-0 (HCl)
- PubChem CID: 10104064
- ChemSpider: 8279591
- ChEMBL: ChEMBL6391
- CompTox Dashboard (EPA): DTXSID10435622

Chemical and physical data
- Formula: C_{11}H_{15}NO_{2}
- Molar mass: 193.246 g·mol^{−1}
- 3D model (JSmol): Interactive image
- SMILES: O2COc1c2ccc(c1C)CC(C)N
- InChI: InChI=1S/C11H15NO2/c1-7(12)5-9-3-4-10-11(8(9)2)14-6-13-10/h3-4,7H,5-6,12H2,1-2H3; Key:WVACHJAKQMSYSU-UHFFFAOYSA-N

2-Methyl-3,4-methylenedioxyamphetamine (2-methyl-MDA) is an entactogen-related drug of the amphetamine class. It acts as a selective serotonin releasing agent (SSRA), with IC_{50} values of 93nM, 12,000nM, and 1,937nM for serotonin, dopamine, and norepinephrine efflux. 2-Methyl-MDA is more potent than MDA and 5-methyl-MDA. However, it is slightly more selective for serotonin over dopamine and norepinephrine release in comparison to 5-methyl-MDA.

== See also ==
- Substituted methylenedioxyphenethylamine
- 2,6-di-tert-butylphenol
