= Fenfluramine =

Medication used to treat seizures

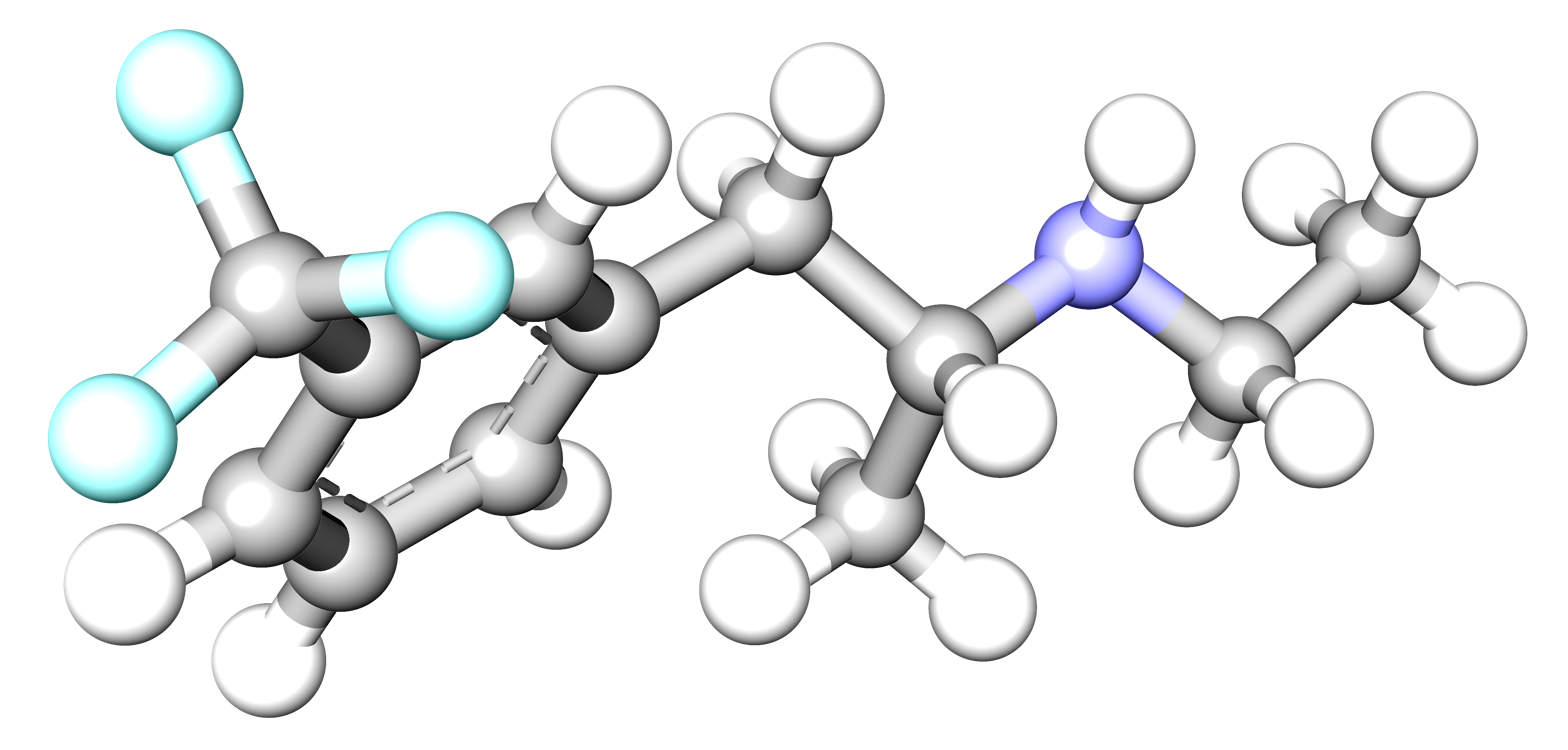

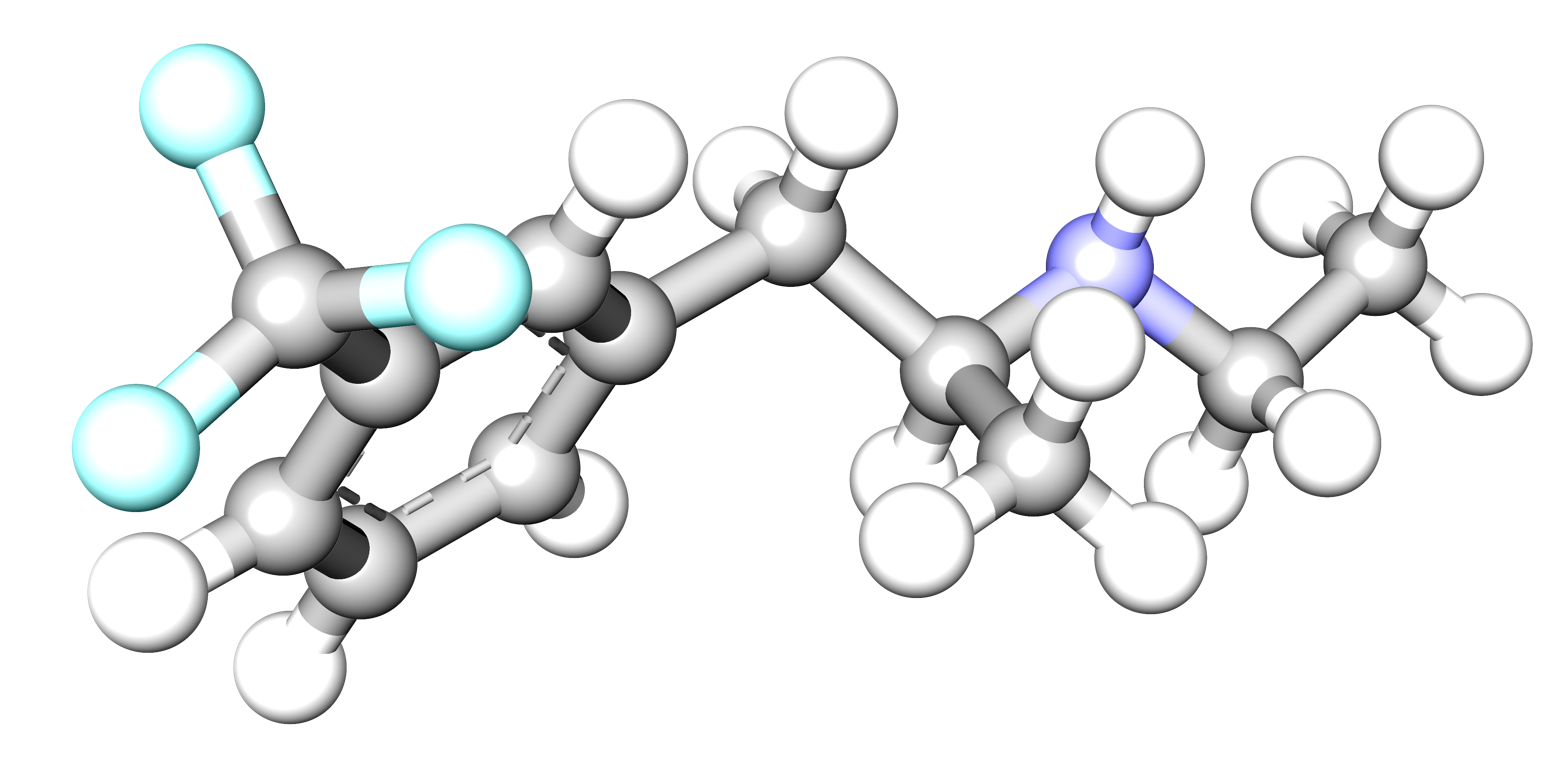

Clinical data
- Trade names: Seizures: Fintepla; Weight loss: Pondimin, Ponderax, Ponderal, others
- Other names: ZX008; 3-Trifluoromethyl-N-ethylamphetamine
- AHFS/Drugs.com: Professional Drug Facts
- MedlinePlus: a620045
- License data: US DailyMed: Fenfluramine
- Pregnancy category: AU: B2
- Routes of administration: By mouth
- Drug class: Serotonin–norepinephrine releasing agent; Serotonin 5-HT_{2A}, 5-HT_{2B}, and 5-HT_{2C} receptor agonist; Anoretic; Anticonvulsant
- ATC code: A08AA02 (WHO) N03AX26 (WHO)

Legal status
- Legal status: BR: Class F4 (Other prohibited substances); US: ℞-only; EU: Rx-only

Pharmacokinetic data
- Elimination half-life: 13–30 hours

Identifiers
- IUPAC name: (RS)-N-ethyl- 1-[3-(trifluoromethyl)phenyl]propan-2-amine
- CAS Number: 458-24-2
- PubChem CID: 3337
- IUPHAR/BPS: 4613
- DrugBank: DB00574
- ChemSpider: 3220
- UNII: 2DS058H2CF
- KEGG: D07945; C06996
- ChEBI: CHEBI:5000
- ChEMBL: ChEMBL87493
- CompTox Dashboard (EPA): DTXSID4023044
- ECHA InfoCard: 100.006.616

Chemical and physical data
- Formula: C_{12}H_{16}F_{3}N
- Molar mass: 231.262 g·mol^{−1}
- 3D model (JSmol): Interactive image
- Chirality: Racemic mixture
- SMILES: CCNC(C)Cc1cccc(C(F)(F)F)c1
- InChI: InChI=1S/C12H16F3N/c1-3-16-9(2)7-10-5-4-6-11(8-10)12(13,14)15/h4-6,8-9,16H,3,7H2,1-2H3; Key:DBGIVFWFUFKIQN-UHFFFAOYSA-N

Fenfluramine, sold under the brand name Fintepla, is a serotonergic medication used for the treatment of seizures associated with Dravet syndrome and Lennox–Gastaut syndrome. It was formerly used as an appetite suppressant in the treatment of obesity, but was discontinued for this use due to cardiovascular toxicity before being repurposed for new indications. Fenfluramine was used for weight loss both alone under the brand name Pondimin and in combination with phentermine commonly known as fen-phen.

Side effects of fenfluramine in people treated for seizures include decreased appetite, somnolence, sedation, lethargy, diarrhea, constipation, abnormal echocardiogram, fatigue, malaise, asthenia, ataxia, balance disorder, gait disturbance, increased blood pressure, drooling, excessive salivation, fever, upper respiratory tract infection, vomiting, appetite loss, weight loss, falls, and status epilepticus. Fenfluramine acts as a serotonin and norepinephrine releasing agent, agonist of the serotonin 5-HT_{2} receptors, and sigma σ_{1} receptor positive modulator. Its mechanism of action in the treatment of seizures is unknown, but may involve increased activation of certain serotonin receptors and the sigma σ_{1} receptor. Chemically, fenfluramine is a phenethylamine and amphetamine.

Fenfluramine was developed in the early 1960s and was first introduced for medical use as an appetite suppressant in France in 1963 followed by approval in the United States in 1973. In the 1990s, fenfluramine came to be associated with cardiovascular toxicity, and because of this, was withdrawn from the United States market in 1997. Subsequently, it was repurposed for the treatment of seizures and was reintroduced in the United States and the European Union in 2020. Fenfluramine was previously a schedule IV controlled substance in the United States. However, the substance has since no-longer been subject to control pursuant to rule-making issued on 23 December 2022.

== Medical uses ==
=== Seizures ===
Fenfluramine is indicated for the treatment of seizures associated with Dravet syndrome and Lennox–Gastaut syndrome in people age two and older.

Dravet syndrome is a life-threatening, rare and chronic form of epilepsy. It is often characterized by severe and unrelenting seizures despite medical treatment.

Research is indicating a potential of fenfluramine to treat those with Sunflower syndrome, a rare form of epilepsy often manifesting in distinct hand waiving in front of the face and a tendency to stare at or face the sun.

=== Obesity ===
Fenfluramine was formerly used as an appetite suppressant in the treatment of obesity, but was withdrawn for this use due to cardiovascular toxicity.

== Adverse effects ==
The most common adverse reactions in people with seizures include decreased appetite; drowsiness, sedation and lethargy; diarrhea; constipation; abnormal echocardiogram; fatigue or lack of energy; ataxia (lack of coordination), balance disorder, gait disturbance (trouble with walking); increased blood pressure; drooling, salivary hypersecretion (saliva overproduction); pyrexia (fever); upper respiratory tract infection; vomiting; decreased weight; risk of falls; and status epilepticus.

The U.S. Food and Drug Administration (FDA) fenfluramine labeling includes a boxed warning stating the drug is associated with valvular heart disease (VHD) and pulmonary arterial hypertension (PAH). Because of the risks of VHD and PAH, fenfluramine is available only through a restricted drug distribution program, under a risk evaluation and mitigation strategy (REMS). The fenfluramine REMS requires health care professionals who prescribe fenfluramine and pharmacies that dispense fenfluramine to be specially certified in the fenfluramine REMS and that patients be enrolled in the REMS. As part of the REMS requirements, prescribers and patients must adhere to the required cardiac monitoring with echocardiograms to receive fenfluramine.

At higher therapeutic doses, headache, diarrhea, dizziness, dry mouth, erectile dysfunction, anxiety, insomnia, irritability, lethargy, and CNS stimulation have been reported with fenfluramine.

There have been reports associating chronic fenfluramine treatment with emotional instability, cognitive deficits, depression, psychosis, exacerbation of pre-existing psychosis (schizophrenia), and sleep disturbances. It has been suggested that some of these effects may be mediated by serotonergic neurotoxicity/depletion of serotonin with chronic administration or activation of serotonin 5-HT_{2A} receptors.

=== Heart valve disease ===
The distinctive valvular abnormality seen with fenfluramine is a thickening of the leaflet and chordae tendineae. One mechanism used to explain this phenomenon involves heart valve serotonin receptors, which are thought to help regulate growth. Since fenfluramine and its active metabolite norfenfluramine stimulate serotonin receptors, this may have led to the valvular abnormalities found in patients using fenfluramine. In particular norfenfluramine is a potent inhibitor of the re-uptake of 5-HT into nerve terminals. Fenfluramine and its active metabolite norfenfluramine affect the 5-HT_{2B} receptors, which are plentiful in human cardiac valves. The suggested mechanism by which fenfluramine causes damage is through over or inappropriate stimulation of these receptors leading to inappropriate valve cell division. Supporting this idea is the fact that this valve abnormality has also occurred in patients using other drugs that act on 5-HT_{2B} receptors.

According to a study of 5,743 former users conducted by a plaintiff's expert cardiologist, damage to the heart valve continued long after stopping the medication. Of the users tested, 20% of women, and 12% of men were affected. For all ex-users, there was a 7-fold increase of chances of needing surgery for faulty heart valves caused by the drug.

== Overdose ==
In overdose, fenfluramine can cause serotonin syndrome and rapidly result in death.

== Pharmacology ==
=== Pharmacodynamics ===
Monoamine release of fenfluramine and related agents (EC_{50}, nM)
Compound	NE	DA	5-HT	Ref
Dextroamphetamine	6.6–7.2	5.8–24.8	698–1,765	
Dextroethylamphetamine	28.8	44.1	333.0	
Fenfluramine	739	>10,000 (RI)	79.3–108	
Dexfenfluramine	302	>10,000	51.7	
Levfenfluramine	>10,000	>10,000	147	
Norfenfluramine	168–170	1,900–1,925	104	
Dexnorfenfluramine	72.7	924	59.3	
Levnorfenfluramine	474	>10,000	287	
Phentermine	28.8–39.4	262	2,575–3,511	
Chlorphentermine	>10,000 (RI)	935–2,650	18.2–30.9	
Notes: The smaller the value, the more strongly the drug releases the neurotransmitter. The assays were done in rat brain synaptosomes and human potencies may be different. See also Monoamine releasing agent § Activity profiles for a larger table with more compounds. Refs:

Fenfluramine acts primarily as a serotonin releasing agent (SRA). It increases the level of serotonin, a neurotransmitter that regulates mood, appetite and other functions. Fenfluramine causes the release of serotonin by disrupting vesicular storage of the neurotransmitter, and reversing serotonin transporter function. The drug also acts as a norepinephrine releasing agent (NRA) to a lesser extent, particularly via its active metabolite norfenfluramine. At high concentrations, norfenfluramine, though not fenfluramine, also acts as a dopamine releasing agent (DRA), and so fenfluramine may do this at very high doses as well. In addition to monoamine release, while fenfluramine binds only very weakly to the serotonin 5-HT_{2} receptors, norfenfluramine binds to and activates the serotonin 5-HT_{2B} and 5-HT_{2C} receptors with high affinity and the serotonin 5-HT_{2A} receptor with moderate affinity. The result of the increased serotonergic and noradrenergic neurotransmission is a feeling of fullness and reduced appetite.

In spite of acting as a serotonin 5-HT_{2A} receptor agonist, fenfluramine has been described as non-hallucinogenic. However, psychedelic effects and hallucinations have occasionally been reported when large doses of fenfluramine are taken. Similarly to the psychedelic amphetamines DOI and MDA, it is the (R)- enantiomer of fenfluramine, known as levofenfluramine, that is more likely to elicit psychedelic effects. Fenfluramine and dexfenfluramine produce the head-twitch response, a behavioral proxy of psychedelic effects, in rodents. This effect could be reduced by the serotonin synthesis inhibitor para-chlorophenylalanine and by the serotonin reuptake inhibitors sertraline and clomipramine, suggesting that it is mediated by induction of serotonin release. In any case, fenfluramine is also known to be a direct agonist of the serotonin 5-HT_{2A} receptor via its metabolite norfenfluramine, and this action could contribute to induction of the head-twitch response as well.

Fenfluramine was identified as a potent positive modulator of the σ_{1} receptor in 2020 and this action may be involved in its therapeutic benefits in the treatment of seizures.

Fenfluramine is inactive as an agonist of the rodent trace amine-associated receptor 1 (TAAR1). Norfenfluramine is an agonist of the human TAAR1, with dexnorfenfluramine acting as a very weak agonist of the receptor (43% of maximum at a concentration of 10,000 nM) and levonorfenfluramine being inactive.

The combination of fenfluramine with phentermine, a norepinephrine–dopamine releasing agent (NDRA) acting primarily on norepinephrine, results in a well-balanced serotonin–norepinephrine releasing agent (SNRA) with weaker effects of dopamine release.

Fenfluramine produces hypothermia in rodents, rather than the hyperthermia that occurs with MDMA. When serotonin reuptake inhibitors like fluoxetine are given with fenfluramine, its induction of serotonin release is blocked in rodents. In spite of this however, the anorectic effects of fenfluramine are unchanged. On the other hand, selective serotonin 5-HT_{2C} receptor antagonists block the anorectic effects of dexfenfluramine in rodents. These and other findings suggest that the appetite-suppressing effects of fenfluramine are due to direct serotonin 5-HT_{2C} receptor agonism rather than due to induction of serotonin release.

Fenfluramine has been found to increase oxytocin levels in rodents and humans.

Fenfluramine and related agents at the serotonin 5-HT_{2} receptors
Compound	5-HT_{2A}			5-HT_{2B}			5-HT_{2C}		
Compound	K_{i} (nM)	EC_{50} (nM)	E_{max} (%)	K_{i} (nM)	EC_{50} (nM)	E_{max} (%)	K_{i} (nM)	EC_{50} (nM)	E_{max} (%)
Fenfluramine	5,216	4,131	15%	4,134	ND	ND	3,183	ND	ND
Dexfenfluramine	11,107	>10,000	ND	5,099	379	38%	6,245	362	80%
Levofenfluramine	5,463	5,279	43%	5,713	1,248	47%	3,415	360	84%
Norfenfluramine	2,316	ND	ND	52.1	ND	ND	557	ND	ND
Dexnorfenfluramine	1,516	630	88%	11.2	18.4	73%	324	13	100%
Levonorfenfluramine	3,841	1,565	93%	47.8	357	71%	814	18	80%
Phentermine	>10,000	IA or ND	IA or ND	>10,000	IA or ND	IA or ND	>10,000	1,394	66%
Chlorphentermine	ND	>10,000	ND	ND	5,370	ND	ND	6,456	ND
Notes: (1) The smaller the K_{i} or EC_{50} value, the more avidly the drug binds to or activates the receptor. The higher the E_{max} value, the more effectively the drug activates the receptor. (2) All values are for human receptors except for the 5-HT_{2A} and 5-HT_{2C} K_{i} values, which are for the rat receptors. Refs:

=== Pharmacokinetics ===
The elimination half-life of fenfluramine has been reported as ranging from 13 to 30 hours. The mean elimination half-lives of its enantiomers have been found to be 19 hours for dexfenfluramine and 25 hours for levfenfluramine. Norfenfluramine, the major active metabolite of fenfluramine, has an elimination half-life that is about 1.5 to 2 times as long as that of fenfluramine, with mean values of 34 hours for dexnorfenfluramine and 50 hours for levnorfenfluramine.

== Chemistry ==
Fenfluramine is a substituted amphetamine and is also known as 3-trifluoromethyl-N-ethylamphetamine. It is a racemic mixture of two enantiomers, dexfenfluramine and levofenfluramine. Some analogues of fenfluramine include norfenfluramine, benfluorex, flucetorex, and fludorex.

== History ==
Fenfluramine was developed in the early 1960s and was introduced in France in 1963. Approximately 50 million Europeans were treated with fenfluramine for appetite suppression between 1963 and 1996. Fenfluramine was approved in the United States in 1973. The combination of fenfluramine and phentermine was proposed in 1984. Approximately 5 million people in the United States were given fenfluramine or dexfenfluramine with or without phentermine between 1996 and 1998.

In the early 1990s, French researchers reported an association of fenfluramine with primary pulmonary hypertension and dyspnea in a small sample of patients. Fenfluramine was withdrawn from the U.S. market in 1997 after reports of heart valve disease and continued findings of pulmonary hypertension, including a condition known as cardiac fibrosis. It was subsequently withdrawn from other markets around the world. It was banned in India in 1998.

Fenfluramine was an appetite suppressant which was used to treat obesity. It was used both on its own and, in combination with phentermine, as part of the anti-obesity medication Fen-Phen.

In the mid-1990s, child mental health researchers at prominent New York institutions administered fenfluramine to elementary school boys as part of a behavioral research project. The drug was later removed from the market by the U.S. Food and Drug Administration after being linked to valvular heart disease and pulmonary hypertension.

The study deliberately targeted Black and Hispanic boys. Eligibility criteria required participants to be African American or Hispanic, based on researchers' belief that these groups faced an elevated risk of developing disruptive or aggressive behaviors. White children were excluded from participation. Participants were required to fast for 18 hours and underwent hours of testing with an intravenous catheter in place while receiving the drug.

Researchers sought to determine whether serotonin activity was associated with indicators that they viewed as predictors of future behavioral problems, including harsh or adverse child-rearing practices, antisocial family conditions, aggression among parents or siblings, and increasing levels of aggressive behavior in the children themselves.

In June 2020, fenfluramine was approved for medical use in the United States with an indication to treat Dravet syndrome.

The effectiveness of fenfluramine for the treatment of seizures associated with Dravet syndrome was demonstrated in two clinical studies in 202 subjects between ages two and eighteen. The studies measured the change from baseline in the frequency of convulsive seizures. In both studies, subjects treated with fenfluramine had significantly greater reductions in the frequency of convulsive seizures during the trials than subjects who received placebo (inactive treatment). These reductions were seen within 3–4 weeks, and remained generally consistent over the 14- to 15-week treatment periods.

The U.S. Food and Drug Administration (FDA) granted the application for fenfluramine priority review and orphan drug designations. The FDA granted approval of Fintepla to Zogenix, Inc.

On 15 October 2020, the Committee for Medicinal Products for Human Use (CHMP) of the European Medicines Agency (EMA) adopted a positive opinion, recommending the granting of a marketing authorization for the medicinal product Fintepla, intended for the treatment of seizures associated with Dravet syndrome. Fenfluramine was approved for medical use in the European Union in December 2020.

== Society and culture ==
=== Legal status ===
==== Canada ====
Fenfluramine is not a controlled substance in Canada as of 2025.

==== United States ====
Fenfluramine is a prescription medication in the United States. It was removed from Schedule IV of the Controlled Substances Act in December 2022.

=== Recreational use and effects ===
Unlike various other amphetamine derivatives, fenfluramine is reported to be dysphoric, "unpleasantly lethargic", and non-addictive at therapeutic doses. However, it has been reported to be used recreationally at high doses ranging between 80 and 400 mg, which have been described as producing euphoria, amphetamine-like effects, sedation, and hallucinogenic effects, along with anxiety, nausea, diarrhea, and sometimes panic attacks, as well as depressive symptoms once the drug had worn off. At very high doses (e.g., 240 mg, or between 200 and 600 mg), fenfluramine induces a psychedelic state resembling that produced by lysergic acid diethylamide (LSD).

Fenfluramine has been found to produce acute effects in humans including decreased arousal, elation, and positive mood, decreased anxiety at lower doses and increased anxiety at higher doses, drug disliking, confusion, reduced psychomotor performance, reduced impulsivity, and decreased aggression. Whereas fenfluramine alone decreases positive mood and phentermine alone increases positive mood similarly to amphetamine, the combination of fenfluramine and phentermine results in a neutral impact on mood. Similarly fenfluramine diminishes the subjective effects of phentermine and amphetamine. In contrast to other serotonin releasers like MDMA and mephedrone, fenfluramine does not produce euphoria. The differing effects with fenfluramine may be attributable to its lack of concomitant dopamine release and its potent serotonin 5-HT_{2C} receptor agonism via its metabolite norfenfluramine.

== Research ==
=== Social deficits ===
Fenfluramine has been reported to improve social deficits in children with autism. In addition, it has been found to produce prosocial behavior similarly to the entactogen MDMA in animals. However, fenfluramine has shown limited effectiveness in treating the symptoms of autism generally. Moreover, the cardiovascular toxicity and neurotoxicity of fenfluramine make it unsuitable for clinical use in the treatment of social deficits.
