= Fludorex =

Stimulant appetite suppressant drug

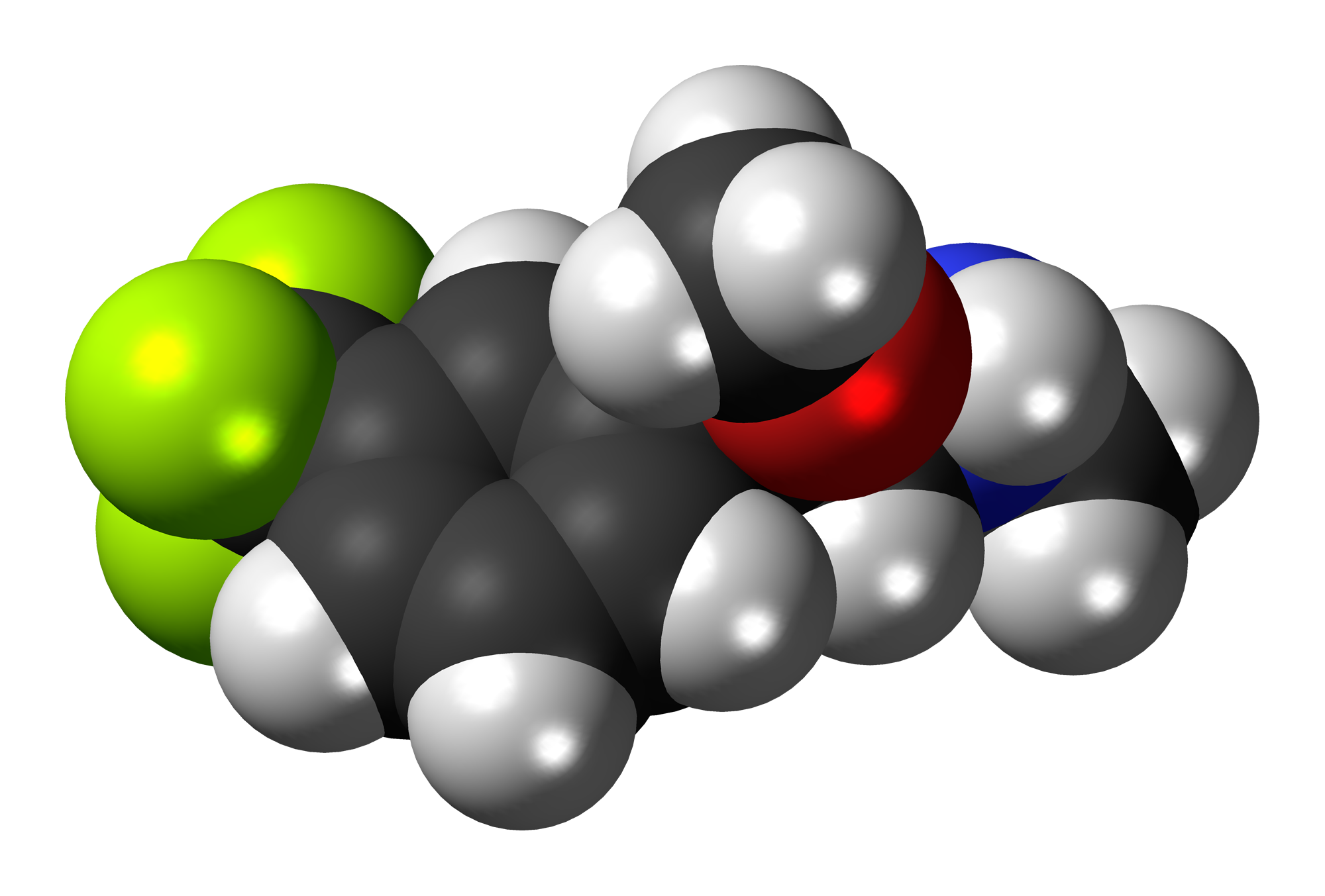

Clinical data
- ATC code: none

Identifiers
- IUPAC name: (RS)-2-methoxy-N-methyl-2-[3-(trifluoromethyl)phenyl]ethanamine
- CAS Number: 15221-81-5
- PubChem CID: 27139
- ChemSpider: 25259
- UNII: 346FQP00BI
- KEGG: D04205
- CompTox Dashboard (EPA): DTXSID20864565

Chemical and physical data
- Formula: C_{11}H_{14}F_{3}NO
- Molar mass: 233.234 g·mol^{−1}
- 3D model (JSmol): Interactive image
- SMILES: CNCC(C1=CC(=CC=C1)C(F)(F)F)OC
- InChI: InChI=1S/C11H14F3NO/c1-15-7-10(16-2)8-4-3-5-9(6-8)11(12,13)14/h3-6,10,15H,7H2,1-2H3; Key:CXLOIJUDIPVKOU-UHFFFAOYSA-N

Fludorex is a stimulant anorexic agent of the phenethylamine chemical class.
