= 5-Methyl-MDA =

Chemical compound

Clinical data
- Routes of administration: Oral
- ATC code: None

Legal status
- Legal status: CA: Schedule I; DE: NpSG (Industrial and scientific use only); UK: Class A; US: Unscheduled

Identifiers
- IUPAC name: 1-(7-methyl-1,3-benzodioxol-5-yl)propan-2-amine
- CAS Number: 749191-14-8 204916-89-2 (HCl)
- PubChem CID: 10012829
- ChemSpider: 8188403
- UNII: 10R3PP3FVM
- ChEMBL: ChEMBL6330
- CompTox Dashboard (EPA): DTXSID101024547

Chemical and physical data
- Formula: C_{11}H_{15}NO_{2}
- Molar mass: 193.246 g·mol^{−1}
- 3D model (JSmol): Interactive image
- SMILES: O2COc1c2cc(CC(N)C)cc1C
- InChI: InChI=1S/C11H15NO2/c1-7-3-9(4-8(2)12)5-10-11(7)14-6-13-10/h3,5,8H,4,6,12H2,1-2H3; Key:OLENSVFSNAULML-UHFFFAOYSA-N

5-Methyl-MDA, also known as 5-methyl-3,4-methylenedioxyamphetamine, is an entactogen and psychedelic designer drug of the amphetamine class. It is a ring-methylated homologue of MDA and a structural isomer of MDMA.

== Pharmacology ==
5-Methyl-MDA acts as a selective serotonin releasing agent (SSRA) with IC_{50} values of 107nM, 11,600nM, and 1,494nM for serotonin, dopamine, and norepinephrine release, respectively.

2-methyl-MDA and 5-methyl-MDA have been used to help guide computer modelling of the serotonin transporter complex.

== Society and culture ==
=== Legal status ===
==== International ====
5-Methyl-MDA is not scheduled by the United Nations' Convention on Psychotropic Substances.

==== Canada ====
As per the Safe Streets and Communities Act, 5-methyl-MDA, along with all other amphetamines, is a Schedule I controlled substance under the Controlled Drugs and Substances Act.

==== United States ====
5-Methyl-MDA is not explicitly scheduled at the federal level in the United States, however 5-Methyl-MDA is a structural isomer of MDMA, and so sales or possession could potentially be prosecuted under the Federal Analogue Act.

== See also ==
- Substituted methylenedioxyphenethylamine
