= Anorectic =

Drug that reduces appetite

An anorectic is a drug that reduces appetite. It may be used to assist in weight loss by lowering food intake. These substances work by affecting the central nervous system or certain neurotransmitters to create a feeling of fullness or reduce the desire to eat. The understanding of anorexiant effects is crucial in the development of interventions for weight management, eating disorders, and related health concerns. The anorexiant effect can be induced through diverse mechanisms, ranging from hormonal regulation to neural signaling. Ghrelin, leptin, and peptide YY are among the hormones involved in appetite control. Additionally, neurotransmitters such as serotonin and dopamine in the central nervous system contribute significantly to the regulation of food intake.

By contrast, an appetite stimulant is referred to as orexigenic.

The term is (from the Greek ἀν- an- 'without' and ὄρεξις órexis 'appetite'), and such drugs are also known as anorexigenic, anorexiant, or appetite suppressant.

== History ==
Used on a short-term basis clinically to treat obesity, some appetite suppressants are also available over-the-counter. Several appetite suppressants are based on a mix of natural ingredients, mostly using green tea as its basis, in combination with other plant extracts, such as fucoxanthin, found naturally in seaweed. Drugs of this class are frequently stimulants of the phenethylamine family, related to amphetamine.

The German and Finnish militaries issued amphetamines (Pervitin) to soldiers commonly during the Second World War. Similarly, the UK military was supplied with more than 72 million Benzedrine tablets and the US military with an approximately equal amount for situations, in which fatigue was not deemed to be an acceptable option. Following the war, large amphetamine surpluses were redirected for use on the black and the civilian market. Indeed, amphetamine itself was sold commercially as an appetite suppressant until it was outlawed in most parts of the world in the late 1950s because of safety issues. Many amphetamines produce side effects, including addiction, tachycardia and hypertension, making prolonged unsupervised use dangerous.

== Public health concerns ==
Epidemics of fatal pulmonary hypertension and heart valve damage associated with pharmaceutical anorectic agents have led to the withdrawal of products from the market. This was the case with aminorex in the 1960s, and again in the 1990s with fenfluramine (see: Fen-phen). Likewise, association of the related appetite suppressant phenylpropanolamine with hemorrhagic stroke led the Food and Drug Administration (FDA) to request its withdrawal from the market in the United States in 2000, and similar concerns regarding ephedrine resulted in an FDA ban on its inclusion in dietary supplements in 2004. A Federal judge later overturned this ban in 2005 during a challenge by supplement maker Nutraceuticals. It is also debatable as to whether the ephedrine ban had more to do with its use as a precursor in methamphetamine manufacture rather than health concerns with the ingredient as such.

=== Non-pharmacological alternatives ===
Weight loss effects of water have been subject to some scientific research as a potential non-pharmacological approach. Drinking water prior to each meal may help in appetite suppression. Consumption of 500 mL (18 imp fl oz; 17 US fl oz) of water 30 minutes before meals has been correlated with modest weight loss (1–2 kg; 2.2–4.4 lb) in obese men and women over a period of 8 to 12 weeks.

=== Refeeding syndrome ===
Refeeding syndrome (RFS) is a metabolic disturbance which occurs as a result of reinstitution of nutrition in people and animals who are starved, severely malnourished, or metabolically stressed because of severe illness. When too much food or liquid nutrition supplement is eaten during the initial four to seven days following a malnutrition event, the production of glycogen, fat and protein in cells may cause low serum concentrations of potassium, magnesium and phosphate. The electrolyte imbalance may cause neurologic, pulmonary, cardiac, neuromuscular, and hematologic symptoms—many of which, if severe enough, may result in death.

Refeeding syndrome can occur when someone who has not eaten for a long time, starts eating normal or even binging amounts of food.

Individuals with drug abuse who begin to reintroduce normal eating habits after a period of malnutrition may be at increased risk for refeeding syndrome.

== List of anorectics ==
Numerous pharmaceutical compounds are marketed as appetite suppressants.

The following drugs are listed as "centrally-acting antiobesity preparations" in the Anatomical Therapeutic Chemical Classification System:

- Amfepramone (also known as diethylpropion)
- Bupropion and naltrexone (combination)
- Cathine
- Clobenzorex
- Dexfenfluramine^{†} (the D-enantiomer of fenfluramine; withdrawn for the same reason as racematic fenfluramine)
- Ephedrine (combinations)
- Etilamfetamine
- Fenfluramine^{†} (a component, with phentermine, of fen-phen; discontinued due to its potential to cause valvulopathy and pulmonary hypertension)
- Lorcaserin (withdrawn in the United States by the FDA due to an increased risk of cancer)
- Mazindol
- Mefenorex
- Phentermine
- Sibutramine^{†} (in some countries withdrawn from the market because of concerns regarding its cardiovascular effects)
- Topiramate

The following are listed as appetite depressants by MeSH, an index of medical journal articles and books.

- Benfluorex (removed from the market by the EMA due to increased risk of heart disease)
- Butenolide
- Diethylpropion
- FG-7142
- Phenmetrazine^{†} (withdrawn in some countries due to the danger of addiction)
- Phentermine
- Phenylpropanolamine (withdrawn in some countries because of an increased risk of hemorrhagic stroke)
- Pyroglutamyl-histidyl-glycine
- Sibutramine

Other compounds with known appetite suppressant activity include:

- Amphetamine/dextroamphetamine is known to suppress appetite. The mixture of amphetamine salts is used to treat attention deficit hyperactivity disorder (ADHD) and narcolepsy; it is marketed under the brand names Adderall and Mydayis.
- Amphetamine sulfate (also known as amfetamine) – FDA-approved for the treatment of exogenous obesity under the brand name Evekeo.
- Methylphenidate
- Cocaine
- Caffeine
- Glucomannan
- Leptin
- Lisdexamfetamine - FDA-approved for the treatment of ADHD and binge-eating disorder in adults under the brand name Vyvanse.
- Methamphetamine hydrochloride – FDA-approved for short-term treatment of obesity under the brand name Desoxyn.
- Nicotine
- Liraglutide (brand name Saxenda)
- Semaglutide (brand names Ozempic, Wegovy) GLP-1 agonist
- Tirzepatide (brand names Mounjaro, Zepbound)
- Metformin
- Opioids such as heroin, morphine, codeine, oxycodone, fentanyl, etc.

== See also ==
- Anti-obesity medication
